= List of populated places in Northern Cyprus =

This is a list of cities, town and villages in Northern Cyprus. The list first lists the Turkish name followed by the English name.

== Lefkoşa District ==
=== Lefkoşa Sub-district ===
- Akıncılar – Louroujina
- Alayköy – Gerolakkos
- Dilekkaya – Agia
- Erdemli – Tremetousia
- Gönyeli – Kioneli
- Gürpınar – Agia Marina
- Hamitköy – Hamid Mandres
- Haspolat – Mia Milia
- Kanlıköy – Kanli
- Kırklar – Tymbou
- Kırıkkale – Melouseia
- Lefkoşa – Nicosia
- Türkeli – Agios Vasileios
- Yılmazköy – Skylloura
- Yiğitler – Arsos

Total: 15

==== Quarters of Lefkoşa ====
- Abdi Çavuş – Abdi Chavush
- Akkavuk – Ak Kavuk
- Arabahmet – Arab Ahmet
- Ayyıldız – Ayios Loukas
- Çağlayan – Caglayan
- Göçmenköy – Göçmenköy
- Haydarpaşa – Haydar Pasha
- İbrahimpaşa – Ibrahim Pasha
- İplikpazarı – Iplik Bazar
- Kafesli – Ayios Kassianos
- Karamanzade – Karamanzade
- Köşklüçiftlik – Köşklüçiftlik
- Kızılay – Trachonas or Kizilbash
- Küçük Kaymaklı – Omorfita or Kuchuk Kaimakli
- Mahmutpaşa – Mahmut Pasha
- Marmara – Marmara
- Metehan – Agiou Dometiou
- Ortaköy – Ortakeuy
- Selimiye – Selimiye
- Taşkınköy – Taşkınköy
- Yenicami – Yeni Jami
- Yenişehir – Neapolis

==== Quarters of Gönyeli ====
- Gönyeli – Kioneli
- Yenikent

=== Değirmenlik Sub-district ===
- Balıkesir – Palaikythro
- Beyköy – Beykeuy
- Cihangir – Epicho
- Çukurova – Kourou Monastir
- Değirmenlik – Kythrea
- Demirhan – Trachoni
- Düzova – Exometochi
- Gaziköy – Afania
- Gökhan – Voni
- Kalavaç – Kalyvakia
- Meriç – Mora
- Minareliköy – Neo Chorio
- Yeniceköy – Petra tou Digeni

Total: 13

==== Quarters of Değirmenlik ====
- Bahçelievler
- Başpınar
- Camialtı
- Mehmetçik
- Saray
- Tepebaşı

== Gazimağusa District ==
=== Gazimağusa Sub-district ===
- Akova – Gypsou
- Alaniçi – Pigi Peristerona
- Aslanköy – Angastina
- Dörtyol – Prastio
- Gazimağusa – Famagusta
- Güvercinlik – Acheritou
- Korkuteli – Gaidouras
- Kurudere – Mousoulita
- Mormenekşe – Limnia
- Mutluyaka – Stylloi
- Pirhan – Pyrga
- Şehitler – Sehitler
- Yeni Boğaziçi – Agios Sergios
- Yıldırım – Milia

Total: 14

==== Quarters of Gazimağusa ====
- Anadolu
- Baykal
- Canbolat
- Çanakkale
- Dumlupınar
- Harika
- Karakol
- Lala Mustafa Paşa
- Namık Kemal
- Pertev Paşa
- Piyale Paşa
- Sakarya
- Suriçi
- Tuzla – Enkomi
- Zafer

==== Components of Şehitler ====
- Atlılar – Aloda
- Muratağa – Maratha
- Sandallar – Santalaris

==== Other ====
- Kapalı Maraş – Varosha

=== Geçitkale Sub-district ===
- Çamlıca – Goufes
- Çınarlı – Platani
- Ergenekon – Agios Chariton
- Geçitkale – Lefkoniko
- Gönendere – Knodara
- Görneç – Kornokipos
- Mallıdağ – Melounta
- Nergisli – Genagra
- Pınarlı – Vitsada
- Serdarlı – Tziaos
- Sütlüce – Psyllatos
- Tatlısu – Akanthou
- Tirmen – Trypimeni
- Ulukışla – Marathovounos
- Yamaçköy – Ayios Nikolaos

Total: 15

==== Quarters of Tatlısu ====
- Aktunç
- Küçükerenköy
- Yalı

=== Akdoğan Sub-district ===
- Akdoğan – Lysi
- Beyarmudu – Pergamos
- Çayönü – Kalopsida
- İncirli – Makrasyka
- İnönü – Sinta
- Köprü – Kouklia
- Paşaköy – Assia
- Turunçlu – Strongylos
- Türkmenköy – Kontea
- Vadili – Vatili

Total: 10

== Girne District ==
=== Girne Sub-district ===
- Ağırdağ – Agirda
- Alsancak – Karavas
- Arapköy – Klepini
- Aşağı Dikmen – Kato Dikomo
- Aşağı Taşkent – Sychari
- Bahçeli – Kalograia
- Beşparmak – Trapeza
- Beylerbeyi – Bellapais
- Boğazköy – Boghaz
- Çatalköy – Agios Epiktitos
- Dağyolu – Fotta
- Esentepe – Agios Amvrosios
- Girne – Kyrenia
- Göçeri – Pileri
- Güngör – Koutsovendis
- Ilgaz – Ftericha
- Karaağaç – Charkeia
- Karaman – Karmi
- Karşıyaka – Vasileia
- Kömürcü – Kiomourtzou
- Lapta – Lapithos
- Malatya/İncesu – Palaiosofos/Motides
- Ozanköy – Kazafani
- Pınarbası – Krini
- Yeni Mahalle – Yeni Mahalle
- Yeşiltepe – Elia
- Yukarı Dikmen – Pano Dikomo
- Yukarı Taşkent – Vouno

Total: 28

==== Quarters of Girne ====
- Aşağı Girne – Kato Kyrenia
- Aşağı Karaman
- Doğanköy – Thermeia
- Edremit – Trimithi
- Karakum – Karakoumi
- Karaoğlanoğlu – Agios Georgios
- Yukarı Girne (Pano Kyrenia) quarter was divided into three in August 2022.
  - Yukarı Girne Çiftlikler
  - Yukarı Girne Değirmentaşı
  - Yukarı Girne Eski Türk
- Zeytinlik – Templos
- Zeytinlik Kesim

==== Quarters of Lapta ====
- Adatepe
- Başpınar
- Kocatepe
- Sakarya
- Tınaztepe
- Türk
- Yavuz

==== Quarters of Alsancak ====
- Çağlayan
- Yayla
- Yeşilova

=== Çamlıbel Sub-district ===
- Akçiçek – Sysklipos
- Akdeniz – Agia Eirini
- Alemdağ – Agridaki
- Çamlıbel – Myrtou
- Geçitköy – Panagra
- Hisarköy – Kampyli
- Karpaşa – Karpaseia
- Kayalar – Orga
- Kılıçarslan – Kontemenos or Kordemen
- Koruçam – Kormakitis
- Kozanköy – Larnakas tis Lapithou
- Özhan – Asomatos
- Sadrazamköy – Livera
- Şirinevler – Agios Ermolaos
- Tepebaşı – Diorios

Total: 15

== Güzelyurt District ==
=== Güzelyurt Sub-district ===
- Akçay – Argaki
- Aydınköy – Prastio
- Gayretköy – Avlona
- Güneşköy – Nikitas
- Güzelyurt – Morphou
- Kalkanlı – Kapouti
- Mevlevi – Kyra
- Serhatköy – Fyllia
- Şahinler – Masari
- Yayla – Syrianochori
- Yuvacık – Chrysiliou
- Zümrütköy – Katokopia

Total: 12

==== Quarters of Güzelyurt ====
- Asağı Bostancı – Kato Zodeia
- İsmetpaşa
- Lala Mustafa Paşa
- Piyalepaşa
- Yukarı Bostancı – Pano Zodeia

== İskele District ==
=== İskele Sub-district ===
- Ağıllar – Mandres
- Altınova – Agios Iakovos
- Ardahan – Ardana
- Aygün – Agios Georgios
- Boğaziçi – Lapathos
- Ergazi – Ovgoros
- İskele – Trikomo
- Kalecik – Gastria
- Kaplıca – Davlos
- Kurtuluş – Avgolida
- Kuzucuk – Arnadi
- Mersinlik – Flamoudi
- Ötuken – Spathariko
- Sınırüstü – Sygkrasi
- Topçuköy – Agios Andronikos or Topsioukeuy
- Turnalar – Gerani
- Yarköy – Agios Ilias

Total: 17

==== Quarters of İskele ====
- Boğaz – Bogaz
- Boğaztepe – Monarga
- Cevizli – Cevizli
- İskele – Trikomo

=== Mehmetçik Sub-district ===
- Bafra – Vokolida
- Balalan – Platanissos
- Büyükkonuk – Komi Kebir
- Çayırova – Agios Theodoros
- Kilitkaya – Krideia
- Kumyalı – Koma tou Gialou
- Mehmetçik – Galateia
- Pamuklu – Tavros
- Sazlıköy – Livadia
- Tuzluca – Patriki
- Yedikonuk – Eptakomi
- Zeybekköy – Agios Efstathios

Total: 12

==== Other ====
- Kantara

=== Yeni Erenköy Sub-district ===
- Adaçay – Melanagra
- Avtepe – Agios Symeon
- Boltaşlı – Lythrangomi
- Derince – Vathylakas
- Dipkarpaz – Rizokarpaso
- Esenköy – Koilanemos
- Gelincik – Vasili
- Kaleburnu – Galinoporni
- Kuruova – Koroveia
- Sipahi – Agia Trias
- Taşlıca – Neta
- Yeni Erenköy – Gialousa
- Yeşilköy – Agios Andronikos
- Ziyamet – Leonarisso

Total: 14

==== Quarters of Dipkarpaz ====
- Ersin Paşa
- Polat Paşa
- Sancar Paşa

== Lefke District ==
=== Lefke Sub-district ===
- Bademliköy – Loutros
- Bağlıköy – Ampelikou
- Cengizköy – Peristeronari
- Çamlıköy – Kalo Chorio
- Doğancı – Elia
- Erenköy – Kokkina
- Gaziveren – Kazivera
- Kurutepe – Xerovounos
- Lefke – Lefka
- Taşpınar – Angolemi
- Yeşilırmak – Limnitis
- Yeşilyurt – Pentageia

Total: 11

==== Quarters of Lefke ====
- Denizli – Xeros
- Gemikonağı – Karavostasi
- Lefke – Lefka
- Yedidalga – Potamos tou Kampou

== See also ==
- List of uninhabited villages in Northern Cyprus
- Districts of Northern Cyprus
- List of cities, towns and villages in Cyprus
- Districts of Cyprus
