= Demographics of Northern Cyprus =

Ethnic groups of Northern Cyprus (2006 census)
1. Turks (99.2%)
2. Greeks (0.20%)
3. English (0.20%)
4. Maronites (0.10%)
5. Other (0.30%)

Northern Cyprus's first official census was performed in 1996. The population recorded was 200,587. The second census, carried out in 2006, revealed the population of Northern Cyprus to be 265,100, of which majority is composed of indigenous Turkish Cypriots (including refugees from Southern Cyprus) and settlers from Turkey. Of the 178,000 Turkish Cypriot citizens, 82% are native Cypriots (145,000). Of the 45,000 people born to non-Cypriot parentage, nearly 40% (17,000) were born in Cyprus. The figure for non-citizens, including students, guest workers and temporary residents stood at 78,000 people.

The third official census of Northern Cyprus was carried out in 2011, made under the auspices of UN observers. It returned a total population of 294,906. These results were disputed by some political parties, labour unions and local newspapers. The government was accused of deliberately under-counting the population, after apparently giving an estimate of 700,000 before the census, in order to demand financial help from Turkey. One source claims that the population in the north has reached 500,000, split between 50% Turkish Cypriots and 50% Turkish settlers or Cypriot-born children of such settlers. Researcher Mete Hatay has written that such reports are "wildly speculative" and are picked up by opposition parties for political benefit, which resulted in reports in the south. Such reports have never been scientifically or statistically scrutinised, despite opportunities of opposition parties to do so using the electoral rolls in their possession, thereby continuing a "war of numbers".

The Government of Northern Cyprus estimates that the 1983 population of Northern Cyprus was 155,521. An island-wide census in 1960 indicated the number of Turkish Cypriots as 102,000 and Greek Cypriots as 450,000. As of 2005, the settlers constituted no more than 25% of the electorate in Northern Cyprus.

Northern Cyprus is almost entirely Turkish-speaking. English, however, is widely spoken as a second language.

== Population exchange agreement ==
On 2 August 1975, in the negotiations in Vienna, a population exchange agreement was signed between Turkish Cypriots and Greek Cypriots under the auspices of the United Nations. On the basis of the agreement, 196,000 Greek Cypriots living in the north were exchanged for 42,000 Turkish Cypriots living in the south (the numbers were disputed). The Orthodox Greek Cypriots in Rizokarpaso, Agios Andronikos and Agia Triada chose to stay in their villages, as did also Catholic Maronites in Asomatos, Karpasia and Kormakitis.

== Minorities ==
=== Greek Cypriots ===
There are Orthodox Greek Cypriots in Rizokarpaso, Agios Andronikos and Agia Triada in Northern Cyprus. There are 644 Greek Cypriots living in Rizokarpaso (Dipkarpaz). Rizokarpaso is the home of the biggest Greek-speaking population in Northern Cyprus.

=== Maronites ===
There are Catholic Maronites in Asomatos, Karpasia and Kormakitis in Northern Cyprus. There are 364 Maronites in Kormakitis.

== Censuses and projections ==
The Statistical Institute of Turkish Republic of Northern Cyprus occasionally perform censuses and periodically declare the projections of the Northern Cyprus census. In 1960 - before the establishment of Northern Cyprus in 1983-, Turkish Cypriots were non-accumulated in the north.

Year	Type	Famagusta	Güzelyurt	Iskele	Kyrenia	Lefka	N.Nicosia	Total	Ref/Date
1960	census							104,350	11.12.1960
1983	projection							155,521	15.11.1983
1996	census							200,587	15.12.1996
2006	census	64,269	20,045	21,978	62,158	11,071	85,579	265,100	30.04.2006
2011	census	69,741	18,946	22,492	69,163	11,091	94,824	286,257	04.12.2011
2020	projection							419,810	31.12.2020
2021	projection							448,268	31.12.2021
2022	projection							462,747	31.12.2022
2023	projection							476,214	31.12.2023
2024	projection							489,308	31.12.2024
2025	projection							590,000	08.07.2025

Largest cities or towns in Northern Cyprus TRNC 2011 Population and Housing Census
Rank		City	Pop.
1	North Nicosia	Lefkoşa	61,378
2	Famagusta	Gazimağusa	40,920
3	Kyrenia	Girne	33,207
4	Morphou	Güzelyurt	18,946
5	Gönyeli	Lefkoşa	17,277
6	Kythrea	Lefkoşa	11,895
7	Lefka	Lefke	11,091
8	Dikomo	Girne	9,120
9	Trikomo	İskele	7,906
10	Lapithos	Girne	7,839
