= Asomatos =

Asomatos is the name of several towns in Cyprus and Greece :

- Asomatos, Crete, a village in Greece
- Asomatos, Kyrenia, a Maronite village in the Kyrenia District of Cyprus
- Asomatos, Limassol, a village in the Limassol District of Cyprus
