= Pileri =

Pileri: Πιλέρι (Greek); Göçeri (Turkish)
- Village
- Location in Cyprus
- Coordinates: 35°17′25″N 33°13′0″E
- Country (de jure): Cyprus
  - District: Kyrenia District
- Country (de facto): Northern Cyprus
  - District: Girne District

Population (2011)
  - Total: 228
- Time zone: UTC+2 (EET)
  - Summer (DST): UTC+3 (EEST)

Pileri (Greek: Πιλέρι; Turkish: Göçeri) is a small village in Cyprus, located 4 km east of Agios Ermolaos and 4 km west of Kiomourtzou. It is under the control of Northern Cyprus. In 2011, its population was 228.
