= Myrtou =

Myrtou: Μύρτου (Greek); Çamlıbel (Turkish)
- Location in Cyprus
- Coordinates: 35°18′32″N 33°4′26″E
- Country (de jure): Cyprus
  - District: Kyrenia District
- Country (de facto): Northern Cyprus
  - District: Girne District

Population (2011)
  - Total: 872
- Time zone: UTC+2 (EET)
  - Summer (DST): UTC+3 (EEST)

Myrtou (Greek: Μύρτου, Turkish: Çamlıbel) is a town in the Kyrenia District of Cyprus, north of the city of Morphou. It is under the de facto control of Northern Cyprus.

== Name origin ==
There are several traditions as to how the village got its name. One of them says that the name comes from the plant Myrtos or Myrtia – myrtle. On the western side of the village there is a whole area full of myrtle as well as other plants and bushes.

This particular area is known as Mersinia. According to the writing of ancient writers myrtle was a plant dedicated to Goddess Aphrodite and God Apollo. There is a probability that in this area was a sanctuary dedicated to Apollo and even a small village with the name Myrtos. Myrtou area was inhabited prehistorically.

The present Turkish name Çamlıbel means "area with pines", and the village is currently on the edge of the Akdeniz National park with its pine forests and woodland walks.

Archaeological excavations in two areas of the village Stephania and Pighades brought to light valuable findings. Oxford Ashmolean Museum and a mission from Sydney Australia University carried out the excavations.

The finding proved the religious political and trading connection of Cyprus with other islands of Greece and especially Crete.

== Location ==
Myrtou village is located southwest of Kyrenia at a height of 270 metres above sea level. It is on the south side of the Pentadaktylos mountains and because of its position was considered to be the administrative centre of the area before 1974.

From the village there is easy access to Nicosia through Asomatos and to Kyrenia through Panagra. It was also connected with Morphou through Diorios.

== Population ==
The village for many years had a limited number of people because the administrator of the monastery's property was the Metropolis of Kyrenia. When the Metropolis decided to start dividing the land to smaller plots, the village begun to grow bigger and bigger. People could buy a plot of land build their house and stay in their village rather than to move to the towns. In 1881 there were 69 buildings in the village and the population was 278, plus another 20 in the monastery. Myrtou's population grew to 710 at independence in 1960,

The majority of the people living at Myrtou were farmers cultivating their fields or raising sheep, goats and cattle. Other were working at Nicosia or Xeros. Of course you could find carpenters, mechanics, butchers, storekeepers and so on. After 1974, Turkish Cypriots from Androlykou in Paphos District settled in Myrtou.

The population in 2011 was 872 a drop from 1,037 recorded in 2006.

About a mile from Myrtou, to the south, lies Karpasia, a Maronite village, whose church is of ancient foundation but later much rebuilt.

== Monastery of St. Panteleimon ==
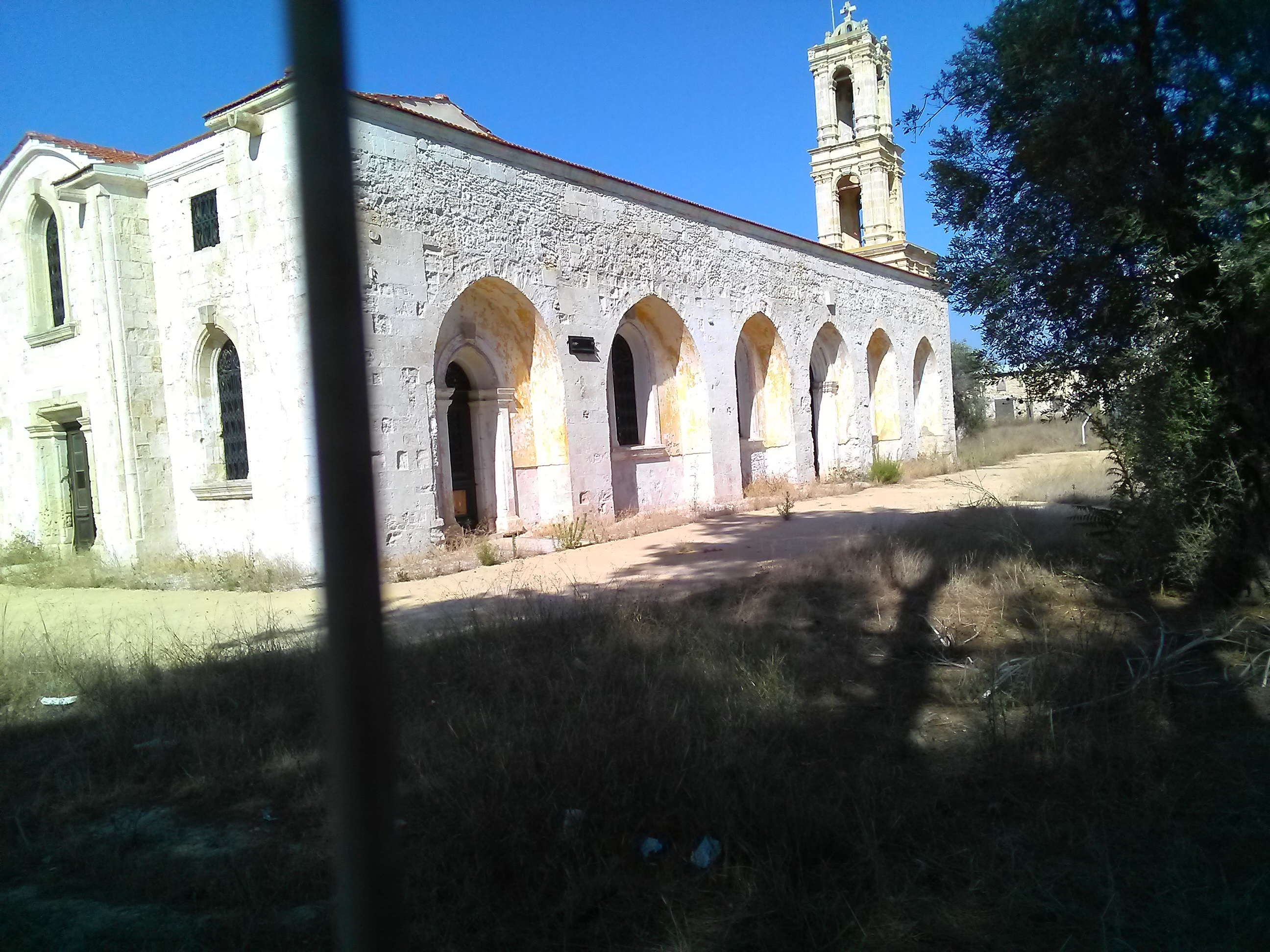
Monastery of St. Panteleimon, about 100 yards east of the centre of Myrtou

Myrtou village owes its development to its monastery of the St Panteleimon. The monastery played an important socio-economic role in the development of the village and the area in general.

The story of the monastery's foundation has not been recorded, however, according to tradition, two monks from Lapithos, called Dorotheos and Dositheos, left their monastery of St Panteleimon at Mount Athos and returned to Cyprus to start a new monastery. With them they brought pieces of the holy bones of St Panteleimon. The two monks tried to find a quiet place in the Lapithos and Karavas area but with no result. They moved on to an area today called AERAS, which was full of wild vegetation. Tired and thirsty as they were they sat down and prayed to their Saint to help them. As they were praying they saw water coming from the marble stones next to them. They drank water and thanked St Panteleimon for his help. In the same place today you can find the Agiasma (holy water) of St Panteleimon. At first the two monks built a small church and two rooms for themselves. An icon of St Panteleimon was placed in the church together with his relics for believers to visit. The monastery is said to have been founded around 1600 A.D. The church has been greatly altered and enlarged and around 17th-18th centuries the original nave was demolished and rebuilt with a remarkable loggia of pointed arches and vaulting (south side). Between the nave and the loggia is the chapel of St Panteleimon of an ancient date.

Gradually the monastery grew bigger, acquiring property, becoming one of the richest monasteries of the island, offering jobs to the people of the villages around the area. The monastery possessed many fields, used for cultivation, sheep, goats and cattle. Later the people working at the monastery formed a new village nearby, namely Myrtou.

The feast of St Panteleimon is 27 July. Formerly, worshippers from all over Cyprus and even adjacent Asia Minor (before 1922) came to visit St Panteleimon monastery on that day. In 1765 the fact of crowds being here on that day from all over Cyprus was used by Khalil, governor of Kyrenia, to hatch a plot to take over the island.

Since the land around the monastery did not yield, in 1950 the Metropolis of Kyrenia decided to abandon it, and the buildings fell into disrepair.

The United Nations Development Programme (UNDP), the (bi-communal) Technical Committee on Cultural Heritage in Cyprus, and EU started conservation works to St Panteleimon monastery on 9 October 2015.

== Military ==
The village hosts a military camp, and some of its houses are used for military personnel and their families. Until recently the monastery was in a closed military zone. In the 1990s the area was a major military encampment and travellers on the road from Kormakitis to Nicosia were liable to be stopped at a checkpoint at Myrtou.

The area saw extensive fighting in 1974. Myrtou is at the high point of the lowest pass through the Kyrenia mountains in the area and once through the pass, there is a clear run to Nicosia and thence Famagusta. It came within range of artillery in the mountains above Lapithos, Contemporary reports show that during the August cease fire, the Greek and Turkish armies were only 100 yards apart. Separated by a thin line of British soldiers who had orders not to open fire.
