= Elia, Kyrenia =

Elia: Ελιά (Greek); Yeşiltepe (Turkish)
- Village
- Location in Cyprus
- Coordinates: 35°20′8″N 33°12′58″E
- Country (de jure): Cyprus
  - District: Kyrenia District
- Country (de facto): Northern Cyprus
  - District: Girne District

Population (2011)
  - Total: 750
- Time zone: UTC+2 (EET)
  - Summer (DST): UTC+3 (EEST)

Elia (Greek: Ελιά, Turkish: Yeşiltepe) is a village in the Kyrenia District of Cyprus, located southeast of Karavas. It is under the de facto control of Northern Cyprus.
