= Karakoumi =

Karakoumi: Καράκουμι (Greek); Karakum (Turkish)
- Location in Cyprus
- Coordinates: 35°20′03″N 33°22′28″E
- Country (de jure): Cyprus
  - District: Kyrenia District
- Country (de facto): Northern Cyprus
  - District: Girne District

Population
- 722
- Time zone: UTC+2 (EET)
  - Summer (DST): UTC+3 (EEST)

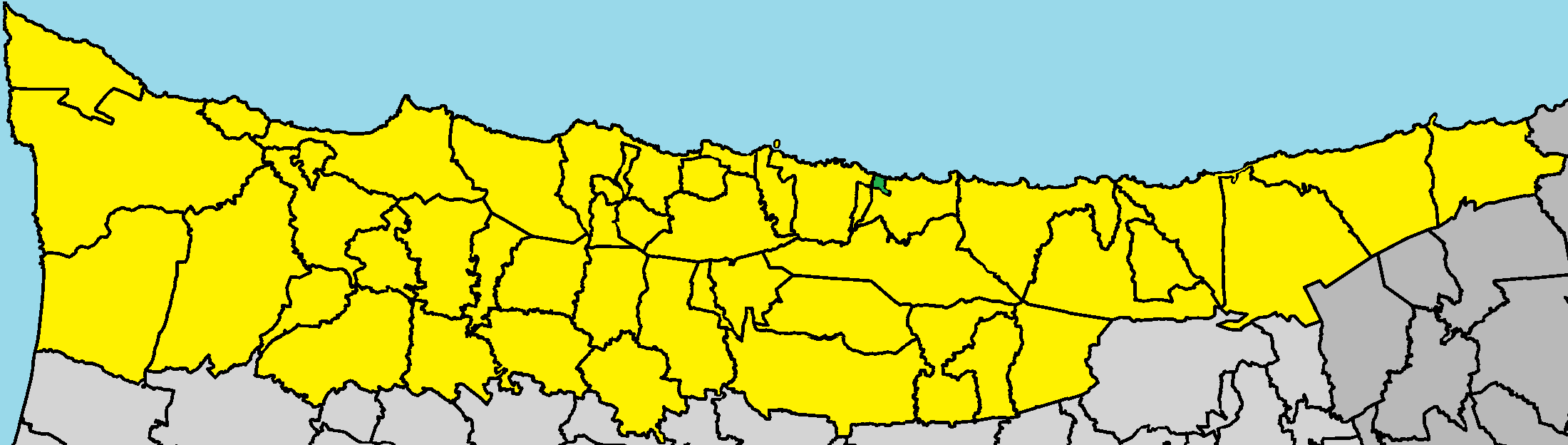
Karakoumi in Kyrenia District (de jure).

Karakoumi (Greek: Καράκουμι; Turkish: Karakum) is a village in Cyprus, located about 2 kilometers from Kyrenia. De facto, it is under the control of Northern Cyprus.
