= Ftericha =

Ftericha: Φτέρυχα (Greek); Ilgaz (Turkish)
- Village
- Location in Cyprus
- Coordinates: 35°19′21″N 33°13′13″E
- Country (de jure): Cyprus
  - District: Kyrenia District
- Country (de facto): Northern Cyprus
  - District: Girne District
- Time zone: UTC+2 (EET)
  - Summer (DST): UTC+3 (EEST)

Ftericha (Greek: Φτέρυχα, Turkish: Ilgaz) is a small village in Kyrenia District in Cyprus, located southeast of Karavas. It is under the de facto control of Northern Cyprus.
