= Edremit =

Edremit may refer to:

- Edremit, Balıkesir, a district and city in Balıkesir Province, Turkey
- Edremit, Van, a district and city in Van Province, Turkey
- Edremit, the Turkish name for Trimithi, Cyprus
- Edremit (olive), a cultivar of the olive tree
