= Cypriot Arabic =

Moribund variety of Arabic spoken by the Maronite community of Cyprus

- Cypriot Maronite Arabic
- Σάννα · Sanna · سانا
- Native to: Cyprus
- Region: Kormakitis and urban areas in the south
- Ethnicity: Maronite Cypriots, Lebanese Cypriots
- Speakers: No L1 speakers in Southern Cyprus (2011); 9,800 total speakers (2013 UNSD)
- Language family: Afro-Asiatic: Semitic; West Semitic; Central Semitic; Arabic; Mesopotamian; Qeltu; Cypriot Arabic
- Writing system: Greek and Latin; Arabic script (historical)

Official status
- Recognised minority language in: Cyprus

Language codes
- ISO 639-3: acy
- Glottolog: cypr1248
- ELP: Cypriot Spoken Arabic
- Linguasphere: 12-AAC-ehx
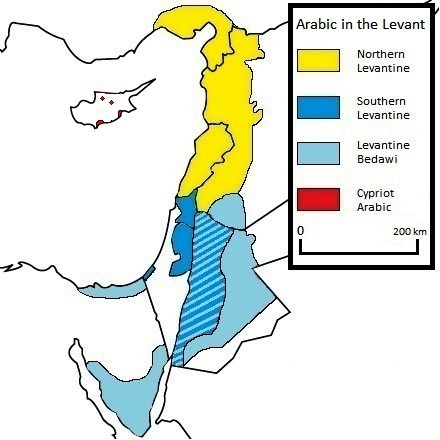
- Cypriot Arabic

- Cypriot Arabic is classified as Severely Endangered by the UNESCO Atlas of the World's Languages in Danger

Location of Kormakitis in Cyprus, former stronghold of the language

Cypriot Arabic (Arabic: العربية القبرصية, Greek: Κυπριακά Αραβικά), also known as Cypriot Maronite Arabic or Sanna (Arabic: سانا, Greek: Σάννα), is a moribund variety of Arabic spoken by the Maronite community of Cyprus. Formerly speakers were mostly situated in Kormakitis, but following the Turkish invasion of Cyprus in 1974, the majority relocated to the south and dispersed, leading to the decline of the language. Traditionally bilingual in Cypriot Greek, as of some time prior to 2000, all remaining speakers of Cypriot Arabic were over 30 years of age. A 2011 census reported that, of the 3,656 Maronite Cypriots in Republic of Cyprus-controlled areas, none declared Cypriot Arabic as their first language.

== History and classification ==
Cypriot Arabic was first introduced to Cyprus by Maronites who came mainly from Lebanon and Syria as early as the seventh century, with waves of immigration up to the thirteenth century. Since 2002, it is one of UNESCO-designated severely endangered languages and, since 2008, it is recognised as a minority language of Cyprus, coinciding with an attempt to revitalise the language.

Cypriot Arabic has in the past been assigned to a Syrian-Lebanese or Levantine Arabic classification, likely owing to the contemporary presence of a large Lebanese-speaking Maronite community on the mainland. However, more recently it has been shown to share a large number of common features with the qeltu or North Mesopotamian Arabic dialects of Iraq, Syria, and Turkey, and a pre-Cypriot medieval antecedent has been deduced as belonging to this dialect area. Indications of an Aramaic substrate suggest it was close to the time of the language shift from Aramaic to Arabic; other features are common to those of Syro-Lebanese and Palestinian, which go back to a period in which there was a dialect continuum between the Mesopotamian dialects and the Syrian dialect area.

In the Cypriot stage, the language was extensively restructured through contact with Cypriot Greek, acquiring numerous features and constraints not typical of Arabic. Essentially unintelligible to mainland Arabic speakers, it is characterized as an isolated "peripheral Arabic" along with others such as Maltese. Its Arabic component is a hybrid of dialects from diverse areas and times of Southeastern Anatolia, northern Syria, and Mesopotamia, as well as the Levant, offering unique insights into the historical evolution of Eastern Arabic.

== Phonology ==
Borg (1997) argues that the sound system of Cypriot Arabic has been heavily influenced by that of Cypriot Greek. Cypriot Arabic has lost all emphatic consonants and stop-voicing opposition (though this is subject to debate in literature)—but retained gemination. Geminate voiceless stop consonants surface as aspirates. Furthermore, Old Arabic /q/ merged with /k/, /b/ became /p/, and /d/ merged with /t/. The following fricatives have merged with each other: /ɣ/ merged with /ʕ/, while /h/ and /ħ/ merged with /x/.

The consonant phonemes of Cypriot Arabic, according to Borg (1997), are /m n p t k f v θ ð s z ʃ ʒ x j l r ʕ/. Affricates [t͡ʃ d͡ʒ] occur as allophones of clusters /tʃ dʒ/. Voiced stops occur as allophones of voiceless stops intervocalically and next to a sonorant or /z/. There are five vowel phonemes, /a e i o u/, and two diphthongs, /aj aw/. Phonological rules observed in Cypriot Arabic include:

- Historical stop + stop clusters are dissimilated to fricative + stop.
- /k x/ are palatalized to [c ç] before /i e j/. /j/ is fully assimilated.
- /j/ between an obstruent and a vowel surfaces as [kj].

	Bilabial	Dental	Alveolar	Postalveolar	Palatal	Velar	Pharyngeal
Nasal	m		n				
Stop	p		t	(t͡ʃ/d͡ʒ)		k	
Fricative	f/v	θ/ð	s/z	ʃ/ʒ		x	ʕ
Trill			r				
Approximant			l		j		

- An epenthetic stop occurs between a nasal and a continuant or sonorant. The place of articulation is inherited from the nasal before it and the voicing from the continuant or sonorant that follows.

Phenomena similar to the first three are also observed in Cypriot Greek.

== Writing system ==
In May 2009, the Committee of Experts for the Codification of Cypriot Maronite Arabic submitted an action plan for the codification and revitalisation of the language to the Cypriot government. The Public Foundation for European Comparative Minority Research reported in 2006 that both the Greek and Latin script had been suggested for adoption. The Greek script is used for Cypriot Arabic in a Cypriot Arabic–Greek dictionary.

Alexander Borg, a linguist specialising in the language, created a Latin-based alphabet with elements from Maltese and Greek that the non-governmental organisation for the revitalisation of the language "Hki Fi Sanna" endorsed in 2007, and some "small texts" have apparently been translated into it.

Cypriot Arabic Latin Alphabet
Uppercase	A	B	C	D	Δ	E	F	G	Ġ	Ċ	I	J	K	L	M	N	O	P	Θ	R	S	T	U	V	W	X	Y	Z	Ş
Lowercase	a	b	c	d	ẟ	e	f	g	ġ	ċ	i	j	k	l	m	n	o	p	θ	r	s	t	u	v	w	x	y	z	ş
Perso-Arabic equivalent	ا	ب	ع	د	ذ	ه	ف	گ	ج	ﭺ	ى	ﮊ	ک	ل	م	ن	ﺁ	ﭖ	ث	ر	س	ت	و	ڤ	ؤ	خ	ي	ز	ش

All letters loosely represent their IPA values, with some exceptions:

- c: [ʕ]
- ċ: [tʃ] (biphonemic)
- ẟ: [ð]
- ġ: [dʒ] (biphonemic)
- j: [ʒ]
- ş: [ʃ]
- y: [j]

== Examples ==
Phrases

Ismi o Kumetto. Ayşo ismak l-id?	My name is Kumetto. What is your name?
Ismi l-ana o Pavlo. Ayşo ismik l-idi?	My name is Pavlo. What is your name? (fem.)
L-aẟa aş pikulullu?	What is his name?
L-ism tel l-yapati o Antoni	My father's name is Antoni
Xmenye u tisca aşka pisawnna?	What do eight and nine make?
Pisawnna caşra u sapca.	They make seventeen
Aş xar kan imps? Imps kan Yamuxmis	What day was yesterday? Yesterday was Thursday
Aş xar tte kun pukra? Pukra tte kun Yamussift	What day is tomorrow? Tomorrow is Saturday
Yamuxxat marrux fi li knise	On Sunday we go to church
Kilt xops ma zaytun, xaytċ casel u şraft xlip tel pakra	I ate bread with olives, some honey and drank some cow's milk
Ye	Yes
La	No

== See also ==
- Cypriot Maronite Arabic Swadesh list
- Languages of Cyprus
- Varieties of Arabic

== Bibliography ==
- "Cypriot Maronite Arabic in Cyprus through the lenses of the European Charter for Regional or Minority Languages". Public Foundation for European Comparative Minority Research. 2006. Archived from the original on 2013-05-08.
- Borg, Alexander (1985). Cypriot Arabic: A Historical and Comparative Investigation into the Phonology and Morphology of the Arabic Vernacular Spoken by the Maronites of Kormakiti Village in the Kyrenia District of North-Western Cyprus. Stuttgart: Deutsche Morgenländische Gesellschaft. ISBN 3-515-03999-6.
- Borg, Alexander (1997). "Cypriot Arabic Phonology". In Kaye, Alan S. (ed.). Phonologies of Asia and Africa (including the Caucasus). Vol. 1. Winona Lake, Indiana: Eisenbrauns. pp. 219–244. ISBN 1-57506-017-5.
- Borg, Alexander (2004a). Handbook of Oriental Studies. Section 1 The Near and Middle East. ISBN 978-90-04-13198-9.
- Borg, Alexander (2004b). A Comparative Glossary of Cypriot Maronite Arabic (Arabic-English). Brill. ISBN 90-04-13198-1.
- Council of Europe (2011-01-18). "European Charter for Regional or Minority Languages. Third periodical presented to the Secretary General of the Council of Europe in accordance with Article 15 of the Charter. CYPRUS" (PDF).
- Council of Europe (2014-01-16). "European Charter for Regional or Minority Languages. Fourth periodical presented to the Secretary General of the Council of Europe in accordance with Article 15 of the Charter. CYPRUS" (PDF).
- El Shazli, Hana (2024). C.Berlinches Ramos; J. Guerrero; M. Benítez (eds.). "Borrowings and Suppletion in Cypriot Maronite Arabic" (PDF). AIDA Granada: A Pomegranate of Arabic Varieties. 21 (21). Prensas de la Universidad de Zaragoza: 176–187 – via univie.ac.at.
- Hadjioannou, Xenia; Tsiplakou, Stavroula; Kappler, Matthias (2011). "Language policy and language planning in Cyprus". Current Issues in Language Planning. 12 (4). Routledge: 503–569. doi:10.1080/14664208.2011.629113. hdl:10278/29371. S2CID 143966308.
- Hki Fi Sanna; Ztite, Kermia (2008). "Comments in accordance with Article 16.2 of the European Charter for Regional or Minority Languages" (PDF). Hki Fi Sanna. Archived from the original (PDF) on 2014-03-26.
- Owens, Jonathan (2006). A Linguistic History of Arabic. Oxford University Press. ISBN 0-19-929082-2.
- Thomas, George J. (2000). "The Spoken Arabic Dialect Of The Maronites Of Cyprus". The Journal of Maronite Studies. 4 (1).
- Tsiapera, Maria (1969). A Descriptive Analysis of Cypriot Maronite Arabic. The Hague: Mouton.
- Versteegh, Kees (2001). The Arabic Language. Edinburgh University Press. ISBN 0-7486-1436-2.
- Versteegh, Kees (2011). Encyclopedia of Arabic Language and Linguistics. Brill. ISBN 978-90-04-14976-2.
- Walter, Mary Ann (2020-04-08). "Cypriot Maronite Arabic". Arabic and contact-induced change. Berlin: Language Science Press. pp. 159–175. doi:10.5281/zenodo.3744513. ISBN 978-3-96110-251-8.
