= Kalograia =

Kalograia: Καλογραία (Greek); Bahçeli (Turkish)
- Village
- Location in Cyprus
- Coordinates: 35°20′18″N 33°37′47″E
- Country (de jure): Cyprus
  - District: Kyrenia District
- Country (de facto): Northern Cyprus
  - District: Girne District

Population (2011)
  - Total: 393
- Time zone: UTC+2 (EET)
  - Summer (DST): UTC+3 (EEST)
- Website: https://kalograia.org.cy

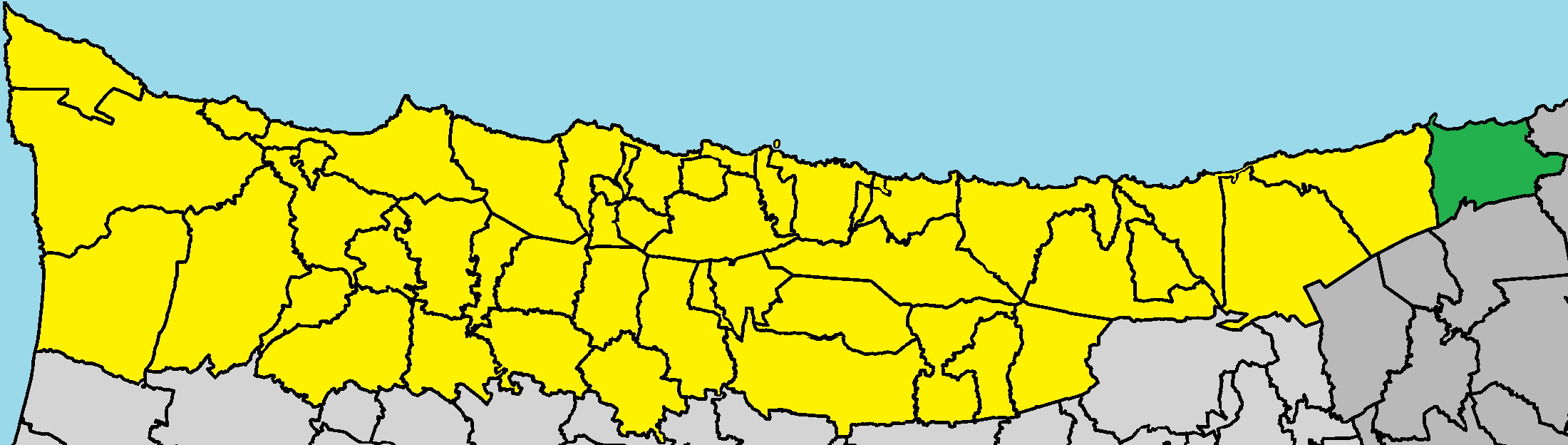

Kalograia (Greek: Καλογραία, Turkish: Bahçeli) is a village in the Kyrenia District of Cyprus, east of Kyrenia. It is under the de facto control of Northern Cyprus.
