= Fotta =

Fotta: Φώττα (Greek); Dağyolu (Turkish)
- Location within Cyprus
- Coordinates: 35°15′51″N 33°13′20″E
- Country (de jure): Cyprus
  - District: Kyrenia District
- Country (de facto): Northern Cyprus
  - District: Girne District

Population (2011)
  - Total: 525

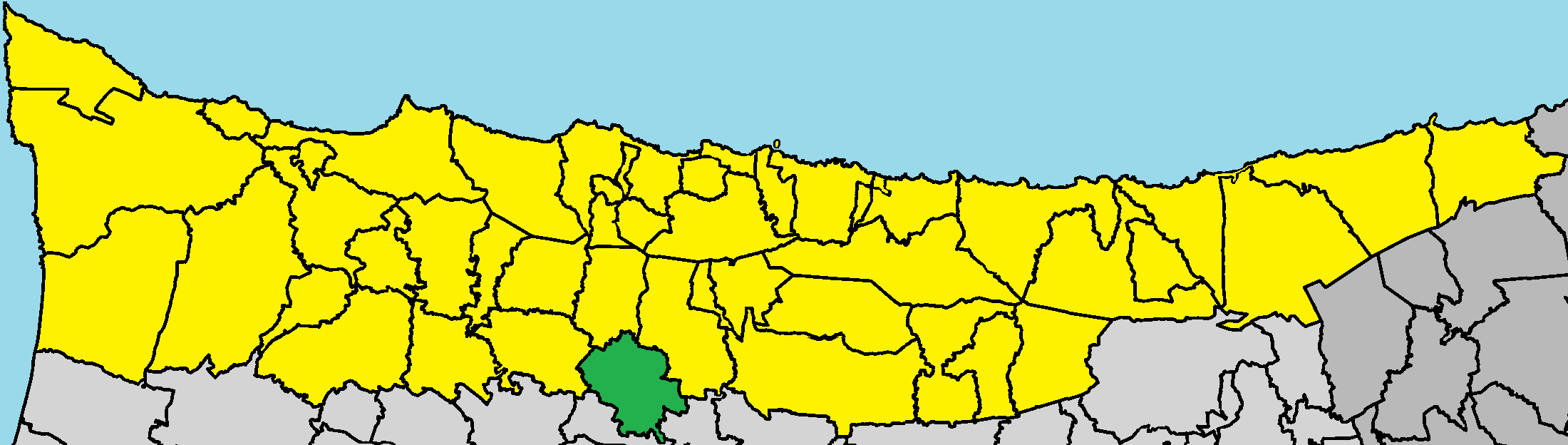
Location of Fota

Fotta or Fota (Greek: Φώττα; Turkish: Dağyolu "mountain road", previously Fota) is a Turkish Cypriot village in the Kyrenia District of Cyprus. Fotta is under the de facto control of Northern Cyprus. As of 2011, it had a population of 525.
