= Thermeia =

Thermeia: Θέρμεια (Greek); Doğanköy (Turkish)
- suburb
- Location in Cyprus
- Coordinates: 35°19′32″N 33°20′3″E
- Country (de jure): Cyprus
  - District: Kyrenia District
- Country (de facto): Northern Cyprus
  - District: Girne District

Population (2011)
  - Total: 868
- Time zone: UTC+2 (EET)
  - Summer (DST): UTC+3 (EEST)

Thermeia (Greek: Θέρμεια; Turkish: Doğanköy) is a historic village, now a suburb of Kyrenia, Cyprus. De facto, it is under the control of Northern Cyprus. Its population in 2011 was 868.

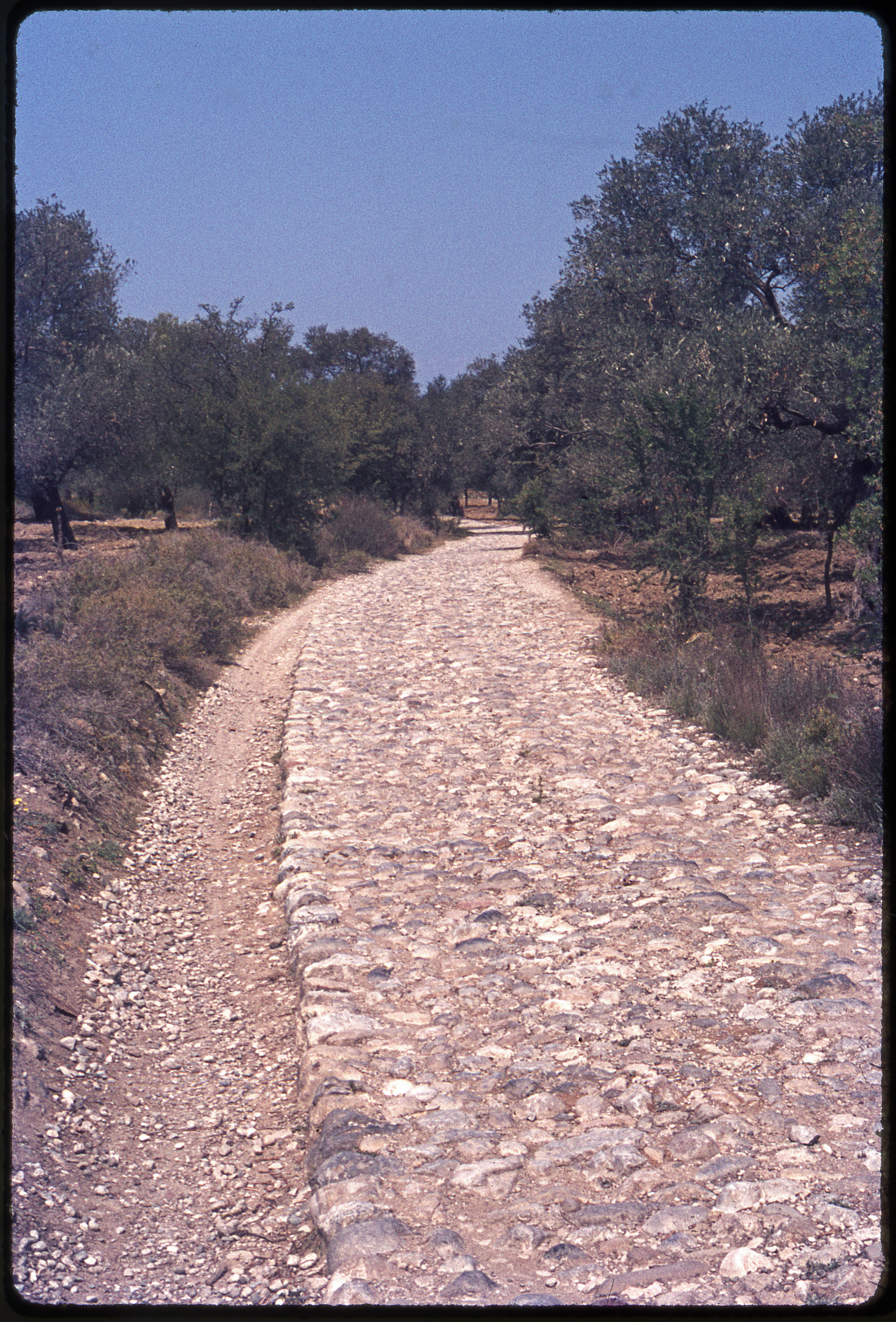
Cobbled road between Thermeia and Kyrenia in 1973 now Zeytinli Sokak

== History ==
Thermeia is an ancient village located to the south-east of Kyrenia and is now a suburb of that town. George Jeffery reports that the village was a Çiftlik, an old Turkish farmstead. A stone-and-pebble paved road from Kyrenia passed through old olive groves to the village.

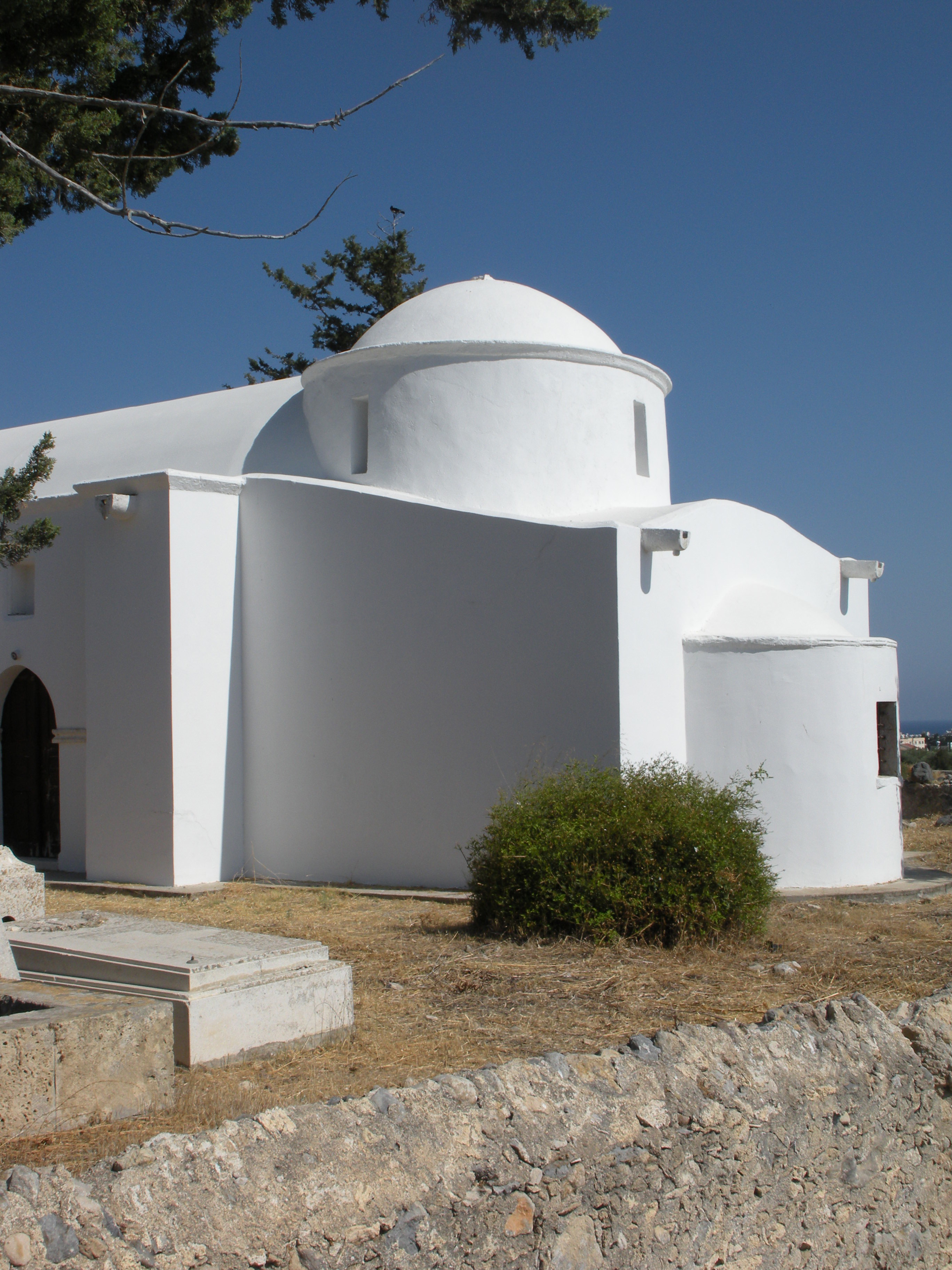
The Church of the Blessed Virgin Mary at Doğanköy from the south east in 2009.

== Monuments ==
The oldest building in the village is a small Orthodox church dedicated to the Virgin Mary. The church, overlooking a river gorge, was built in several phases. The dome, belonging to the eleventh or twelfth century, indicates the building was first planned as a simple cross-in-square church of the Byzantine type. The nave, as well as the masonry encasing the walls round the base of the dome, were constructed subsequently, probably in the fifteenth or sixteenth century to judge from the style north door. The bell tower on western corner was added later, perhaps in the eighteenth century. Similar additions and sequences are found in many Cypriot churches, a good parallel being the old Agia Marina in Pyrga, Larnaca. Both Jeffery and Gunnis report that English sailors were buried at the Doğanköy church, but there was no trace of their graves in the 1970s. Gunnis mentions a "curious custom" whereby any child suffering from malaria was carried three times round the church and rolled back and forth in front of the west door.

Inside, the church is white-washed and without decoration; the floor was given modern tiles in the 1950s or 1960s. The iconostasis dates to the nineteenth century; the historic icons were removed before 1974; the frame itself was damaged subsequently. Efforts to repair the church were undertaken beginning in 2000. While the grounds outside were being cleared of weeds, a number of glazed pot-sherds of the fifteenth or sixteenth century were found, testifying to the long life of the building and settlement. Also found beside the church was an early Christian pillar-base in marble; it may have been brought from Lambousa.

The village proper is located to the west of the church, suggesting the settlement has shifted or that the church was originally surrounded by its own properties. The stone houses in the village retain the vernacular Gothic elements sometimes found in the traditional domestic buildings of Cyprus; according to Gunnis, the oldest of them dates to about 1740. This was the family home of Dimitris Lipertis, best known for his poetry in the Cypriot dialect. The building was heavily restored in 1971-72 by the Department of Antiquities at which time two ruinous rooms to the east side of the house were rebuilt.
