= Karmi, Cyprus =

Karmi: Κάρμι (Greek); Karaman (Turkish)
- Village
- Location in Cyprus
- Coordinates: 35°19′10″N 33°15′28″E
- Country (de jure): Cyprus
  - District: Kyrenia District
- Country (de facto): Northern Cyprus
  - District: Girne District

Population (2011)
  - Total: 55
- Time zone: UTC+2 (EET)
  - Summer (DST): UTC+3 (EEST)

Karmi (Greek: Κάρμι; Turkish: Karaman) is a village in Cyprus, located west of Kyrenia. As a result of the Turkish invasion of Cyprus, Karmi is under the de facto control of Northern Cyprus. Its population in 2011 was 55.
