= Sysklipos =

Sysklipos: Σύσκληπος (Greek); Akçiçek (Turkish)
- Village
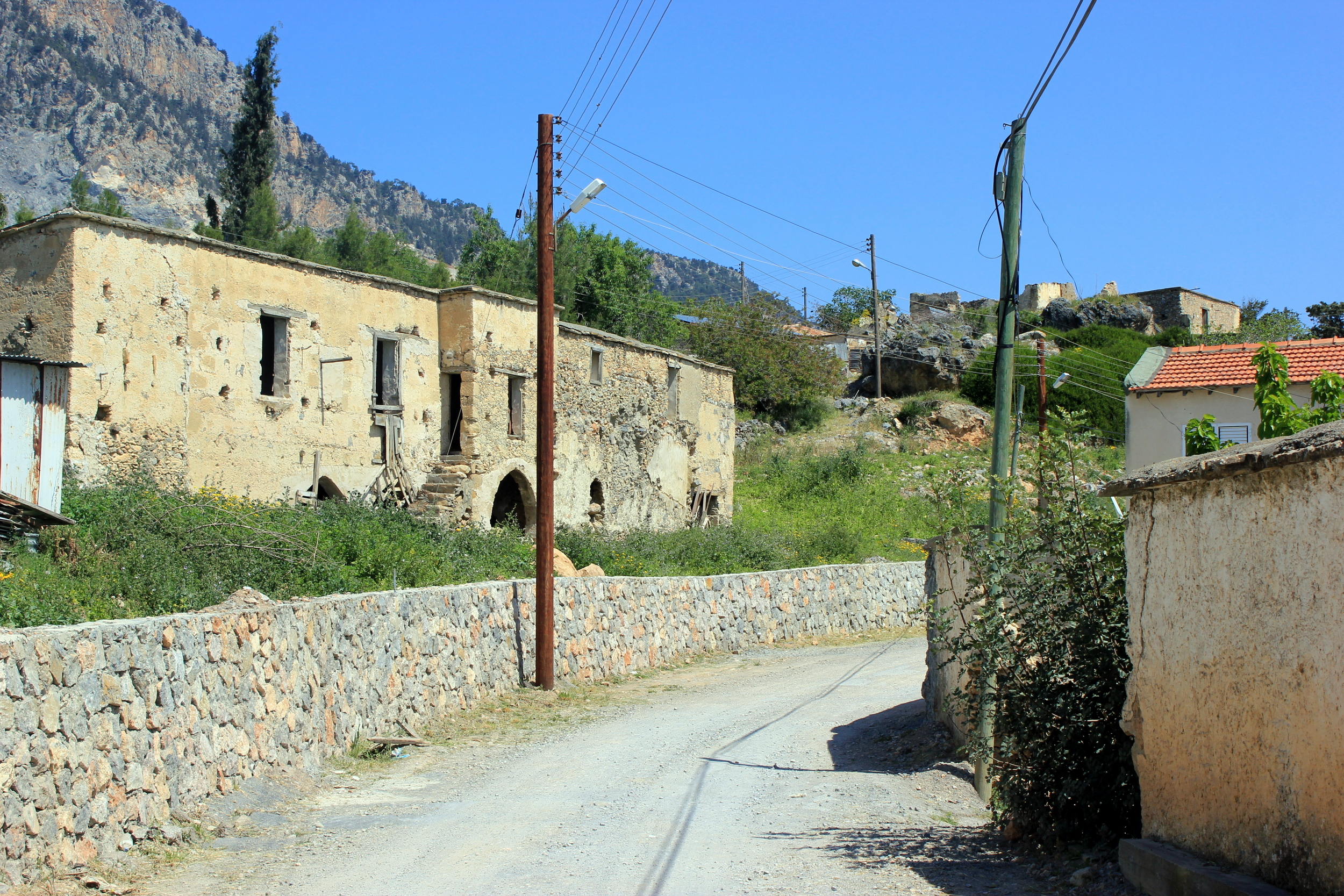
- Main street and ruins in Sysklipos

- Location in Cyprus
- Coordinates: 35°17′58″N 33°10′21″E
- Country (de jure): Cyprus
  - District: Kyrenia District
- Country (de facto): Northern Cyprus
  - District: Girne District

Population (2011)
  - Total: 87
- Time zone: UTC+2 (EET)
  - Summer (DST): UTC+3 (EEST)

Sysklipos (Greek: Σύσκληπος, Turkish: Akçiçek) is a village in the Kyrenia District of Cyprus, located 3 km east of Larnakas tis Lapithou. It is under the de facto control of Northern Cyprus, inhabited by Turkish Cypriot refugees from Paphos.

The Panayia Chryseleousa church and many houses have been destroyed or abandoned. The risks of collapse are imminent. The European authorities are processing its restoration within 5 years.
