= Maronite Cypriots =

Maronite Catholic community in Cyprus

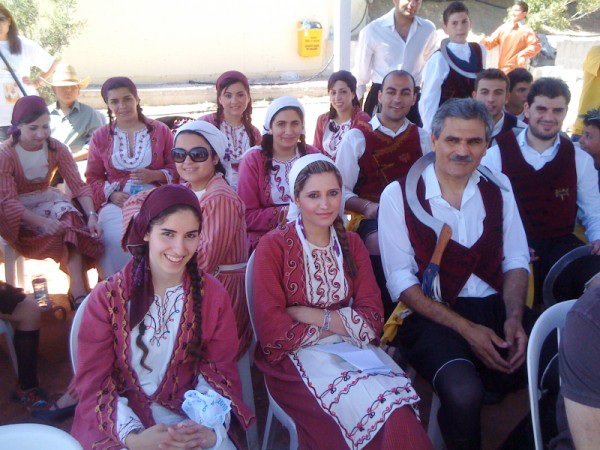
- Maronite Cypriots in traditional folk costume

Total population
- 13,170 (2021)

Languages
- Cypriot Arabic, Cypriot Greek

Religion
- Maronite Church – Catholic Christianity

Related ethnic groups
- Maronites, Lebanese people, Lebanese Cypriots, Greek Cypriots, Turkish Cypriots, Armenian Cypriots

Maronite Cypriots are an ethnoreligious group and are members of the Maronite Catholic Archeparchy of Cyprus whose ancestors migrated from the Levant during the Middle Ages. A percentage of them traditionally speak a variety of Arabic known as Cypriot Arabic, in addition to Greek. People speaking this Arabic dialect originate from one village, specifically Kormakitis. As Eastern Catholics of the West Syriac Rite, they are in full communion with the Catholic Church of Rome.

As of 2025 the Archbishop of Cyprus was Selim Jean Sfeir, born in Rayfoun, Lebanon, on 2 September 1958. He was ordained Archbishop on 19 June 2021. He succeeded Joseph Soueif, who had been installed as the Archbishop of Tripoli, Lebanon in 2020.

== Legal status ==
Legally defined in the Constitution of Cyprus as a religious group within the Greek Cypriot community, which they chose to join by vote just before independence alongside their fellow Roman Catholics of the Latin Rite and the Armenians. While Maronites are part of the Greek Cypriot electoral register when voting for president and members of the house of representatives, they also vote for a special representative that is not an MP but corresponds to the now non functioning communal chambers of the Greek and Turkish communities.

== Demographics ==
In the 13th century there were about 50,000 to 80,000 Maronites in Cyprus, living in 60 villages. Most came to Cyprus with the Crusaders who retreated to Cyprus following their defeat in Levant. However, the reported number of Maronites in Levant at that time was approximately 40,000 people, so it is unlikely that the number of people arriving to Cyprus would have been more. The estimated number of Maronites, who, as mentioned, lived in 60 small mixed with local population, villages in Cyprus, mainly in Pentadaktylos and Karpas area, is approximately 12 to 13,000 people. Many of these returned to Levant during Venetian rule of Cyprus, due to the heavy taxes and this explains their reduction to approximately 2,000 people at the beginning of the Ottoman rule of Cyprus.

The number of Maronites kept declining through the Ottoman rule; 19 Maronite villages were recorded in 1599 by Girolamo Dardini, in 1629, Pietro Vespa records that the community of 1500 Maronites is served by 11 priests, in 8 churches; Giovanni Battista da Todi records 800 Maronites, distributed across 10 villages, and served by 12 priests, in 1647, but fourteen years later, in 1661, he counts only eight villages with Maronite populations 125. In 1669, there were only 1,000 people distributed in 10 villages. Dominique Jauna records a total of 1,000 Maronites and Armenians, around 1747. In 1776, the patriarchate of Lebanon lists 500 Maronites. The 1841 Ottoman census of Talaat Effendi gave a figure of 1,400 Maronites, including 100 in the kaza of Morfou, 1,000 in that of Lapithos-Cérines, 300 in that of Nicosia. In 1878, the Maronites had five villages, namely Asomatos, Ayia Marina, Kambyli, Karpasha, and Kormakitis. In the 1891 census, out of 209,286 Cypriots 1,131 were Maronites, the figure rose to 1,350 in 1921 and 1,704 in 1931.

Until the Turkish invasion of 1974, the town of Kormakitis was known as a centre of Maronite culture. Kormakitis village, was inhabited by approximately 50% of the Maronites of Cyprus. Its characteristic is that its people, mainly the elderly, spoke their own dialect, not spoken by Maronites living in the other villages. The dialect was obviously an Arabic dialect influenced by the local languages, Greek and Turkish.

According to the 1960 census, there were 2,752 Maronites, mainly in the four northern villages of Kormakitis, Karpaseia, Asomatos, and Agia Marina. Following the hostilities between the Greek and Turkish communities that led to the de facto division of Cyprus, most Maronites dispersed to the south. Only about 150 mostly elderly people remained within Northern Cyprus. As of 2010, the total estimated population is about 5,000–6,000, primarily in the southern area of Nicosia.

75% of Maronites live in Nicosia, 15% in Limassol, and 5% in Larnaca.

== See also ==
- Cypriot Maronite Arabic
- Lebanese Arabic
- Lebanese people in Cyprus
- Greek Cypriots
- Maronite Church
- Roman Catholicism in Cyprus
- Human rights in Northern Cyprus
