= Klepini =

Klepini: Κλεπίνη (Greek); Arapköy (Turkish)
- Village
- Location in Cyprus
- Coordinates: 35°18′23″N 33°26′2″E
- Country (de jure): Cyprus
  - District: Kyrenia District
- Country (de facto): Northern Cyprus
  - District: Girne District
- Time zone: UTC+2 (EET)
  - Summer (DST): UTC+3 (EEST)

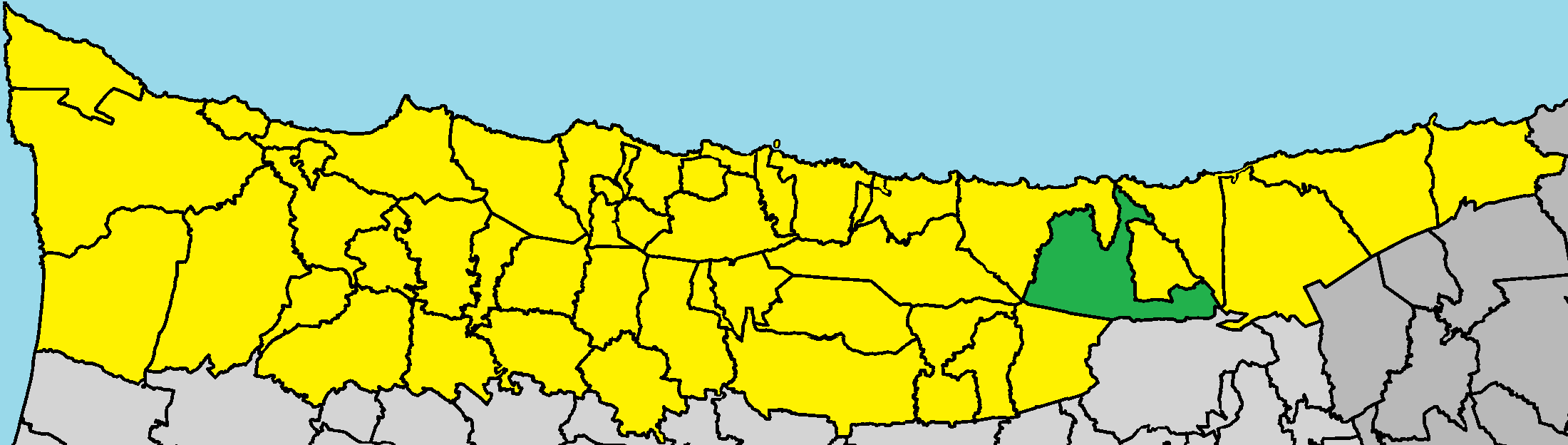
Klepini in Kyrenia District (de jure)

Klepini (Greek: Κλεπίνη, Turkish: Arapköy) is a village in the Kyrenia District of Cyprus. It is under the de facto control of Northern Cyprus.
