= Vouno =

Vouno: Βουνό (Greek); Yukarı Taşkent (Turkish)
- Location in Cyprus
- Coordinates: 35°16′22″N 33°23′13″E
- Country (de jure): Cyprus
  - District: Kyrenia District
- Country (de facto): Northern Cyprus
  - District: Girne District

Population (2011)
  - Total: 299
- Time zone: UTC+2 (EET)
  - Summer (DST): UTC+3 (EEST)

Vouno (Greek: Βουνό; Turkish: Yukarı Taşkent or Taşkent) is a village in the Kyrenia District of Cyprus. De facto, it is under the control of Northern Cyprus. Its population in 2011 was 299.

The village of Vouno (meaning mountain in Greek) is located 10 kilometres north of Nicosia in Cyprus. Its name derives from the fact that it lies at an altitude of 380 meters above sea level and is the highest village on the south side of the Pentadaktylos mountain range. The village of Vouno is one of the 60 villages in Cyprus originally inhabited by Maronites.

With the Turkish invasion of Cyprus in 1974, the inhabitants of the village of Vouno, like almost all the Greek and Maronite residents of the Turkish-occupied northern part of Cyprus, became refugees. The Turks renamed the village into "Taşkent" and destroyed the two Greek Orthodox churches in the village, that of Saint George and the Holy Cross. The Maronite church of Saint Romanos escaped destruction because the Turkish occupying forces decided to turn it into a museum. Thus, today the church is in good condition, at least externally, since nobody knows how it looks internally because it always remains shut and inaccessible.
