= Trapeza, Cyprus =

Trapeza: Τράπεζα (Greek); Beşparmak (Turkish)
- Village
- Location in Cyprus
- Coordinates: 35°18′31″N 33°28′9″E
- Country (de jure): Cyprus
  - District: Kyrenia District
- Country (de facto): Northern Cyprus
  - District: Girne District

Population (2011)
  - Total: 42
- Time zone: UTC+2 (EET)
  - Summer (DST): UTC+3 (EEST)

Trapeza (Greek: Τράπεζα; Turkish: Beşparmak) is a village in Cyprus, east of Kyrenia. De facto, it is under the control of Northern Cyprus. Its population in 2011 was 42.
