= Agridaki =

Agridaki: Αγριδάκι (Greek); Alemdağ (Turkish)
- Village
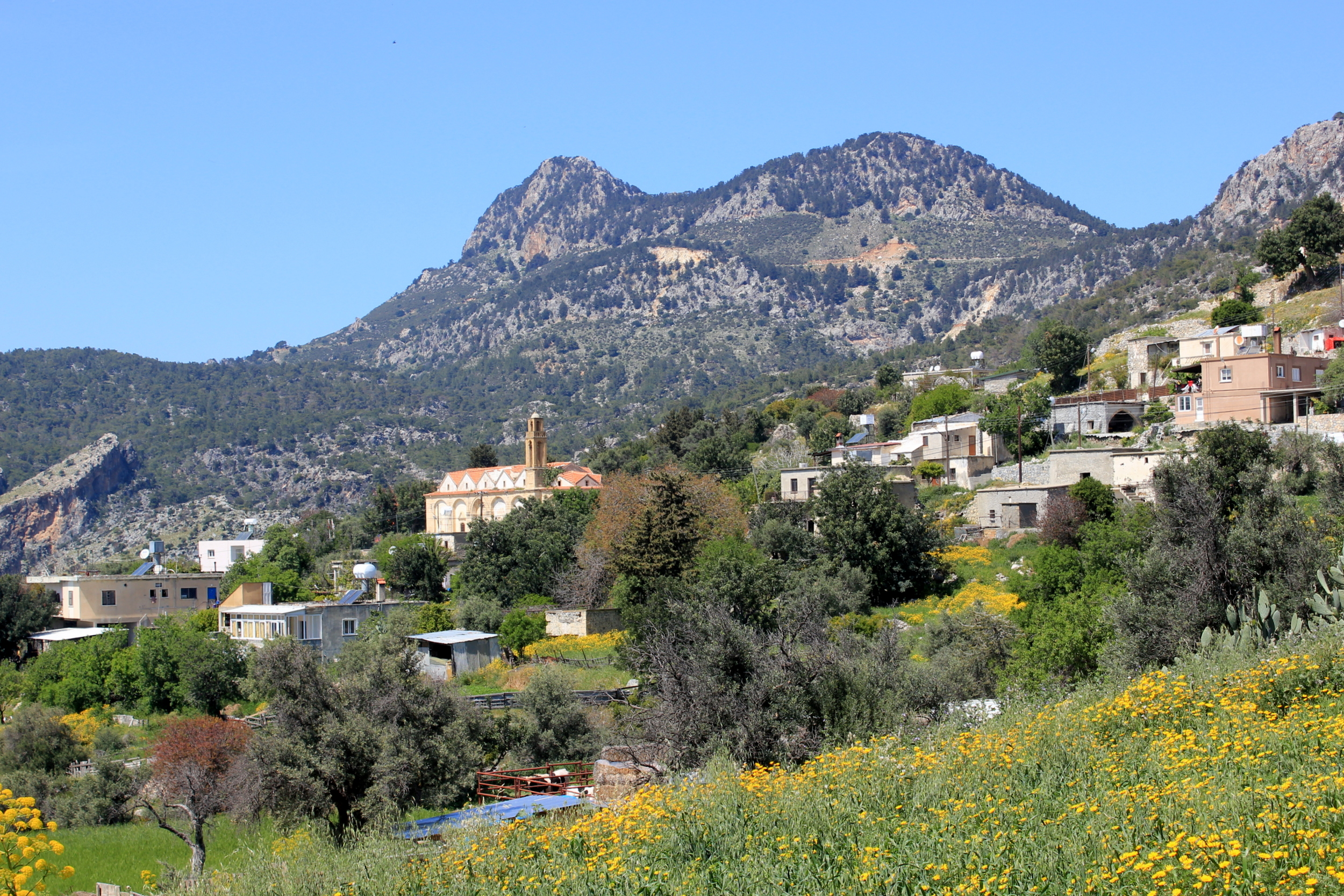

- Location in Cyprus
- Coordinates: 35°18′25″N 33°9′7″E
- Country (de jure): Cyprus
  - District: Kyrenia District
- Country (de facto): Northern Cyprus
  - District: Girne District

Population (2011)
  - Total: 86
- Time zone: UTC+2 (EET)
  - Summer (DST): UTC+3 (EEST)

Agridaki (Greek: Αγριδάκι; Turkish: Alemdağ) is a village in Cyprus, located 1 km east of Larnakas tis Lapithou. Agridaki is under the de facto control of Northern Cyprus. Before the 1974 Turkish invasion of Cyprus, the village was inhabited by Greek Cypriots. They fled before the Turkish forces reached the village. Agridaki is now inhabited by Turkish Cypriots from Paphos District.

== Agios Charalampos ==
The village has a church dating back to 1908. Most of the church interior is now in ruins. In a corner, there is a small iconostasis dedicated to the saint of the church.

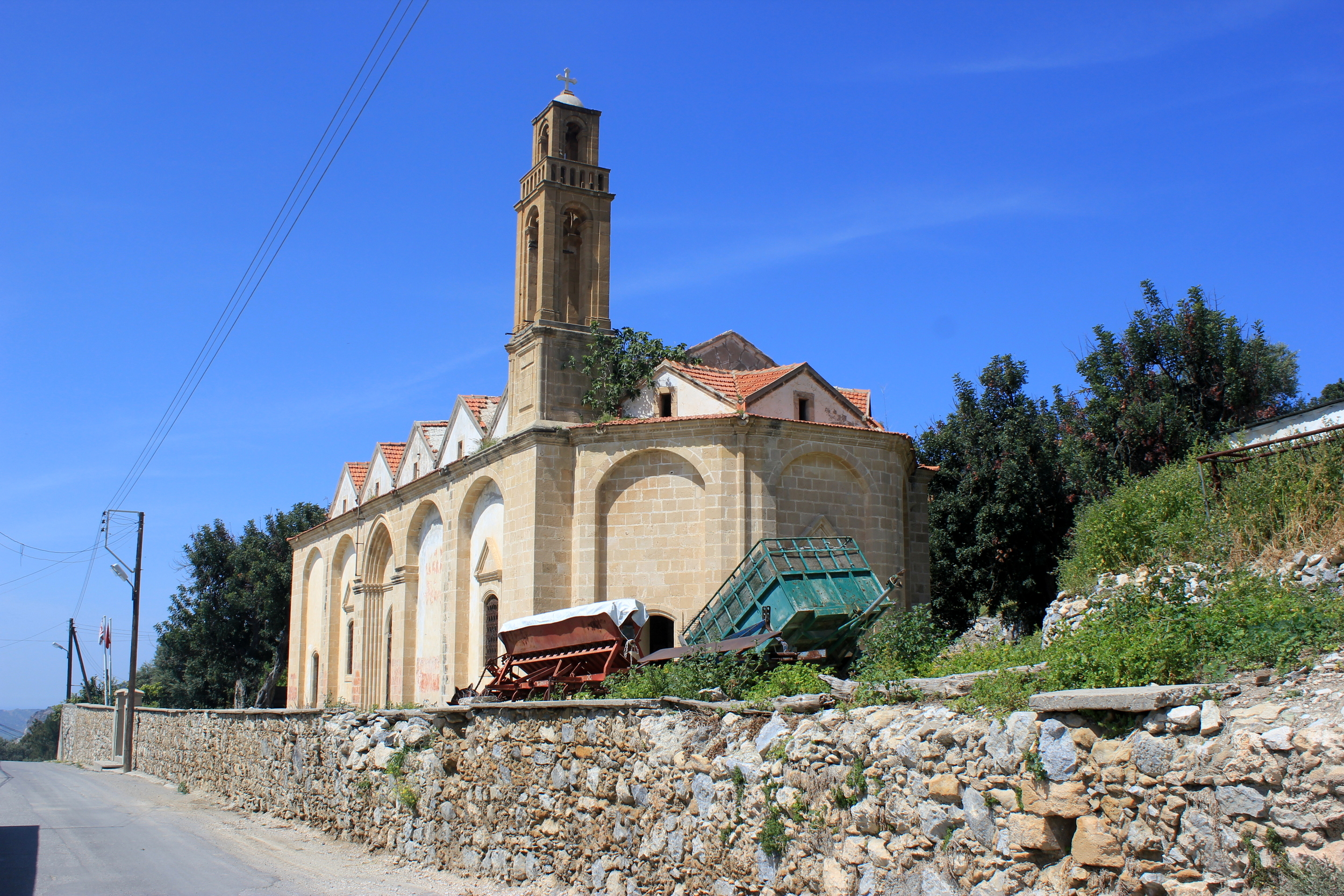
Church in Agridaki

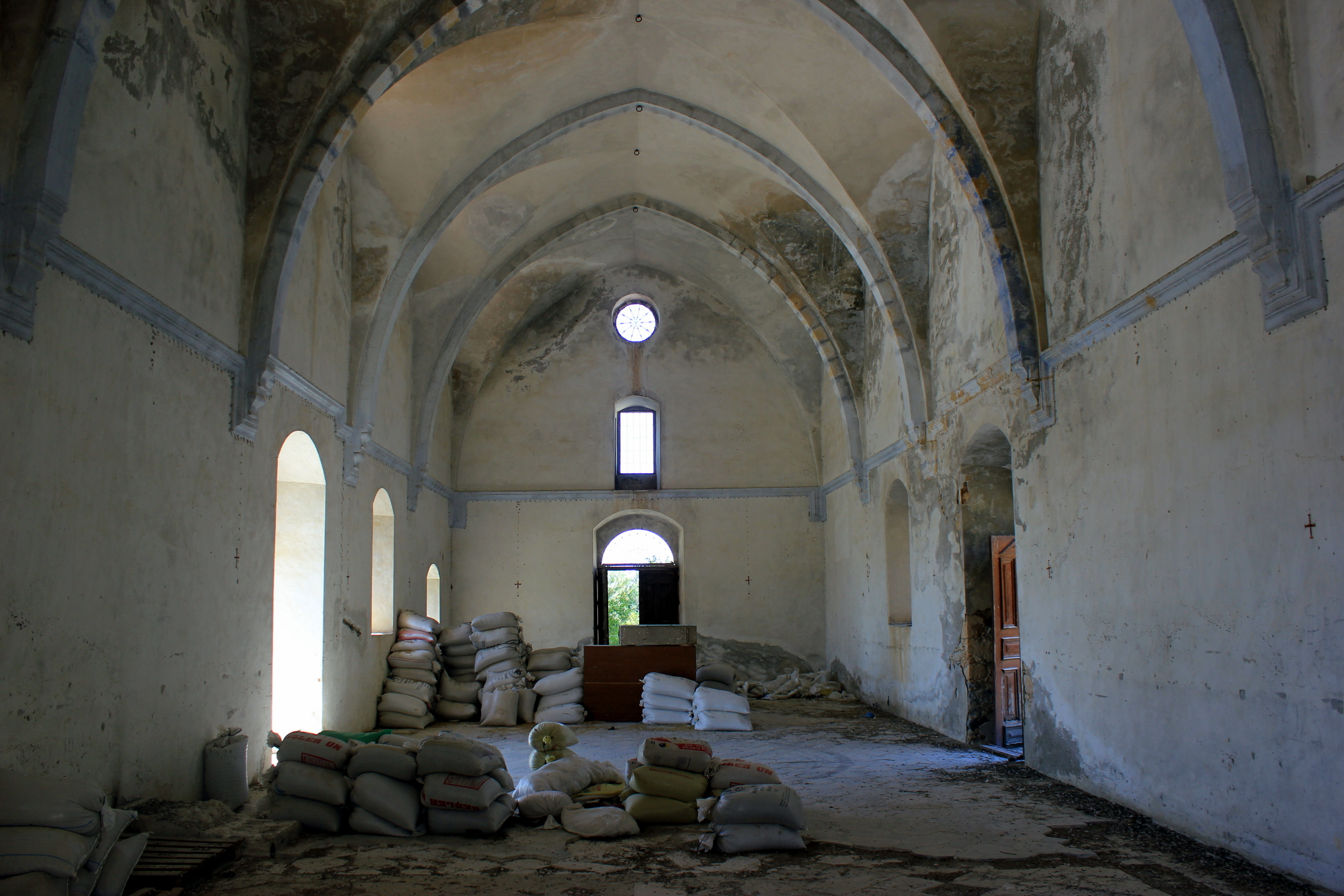
Church interior

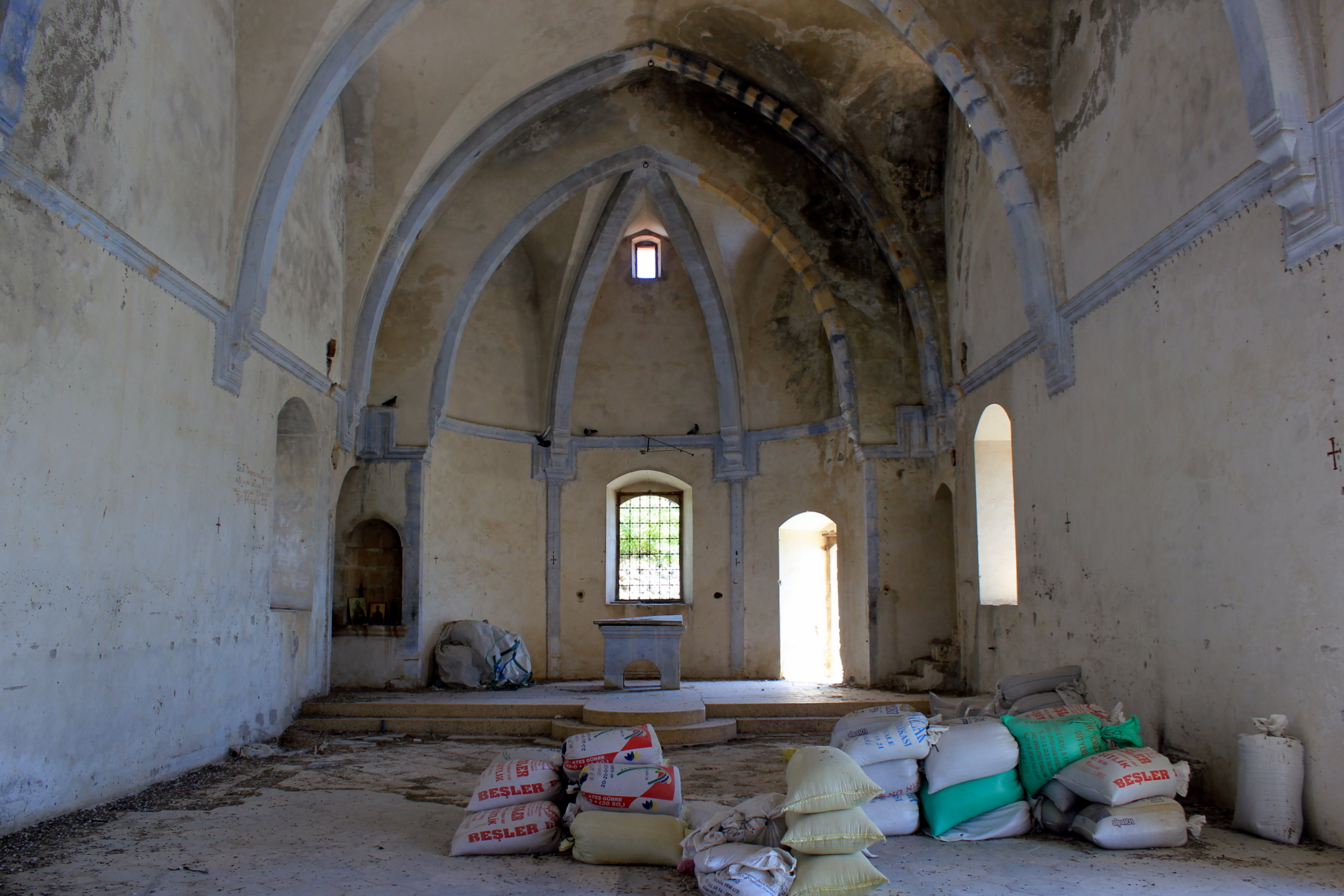
Church interior

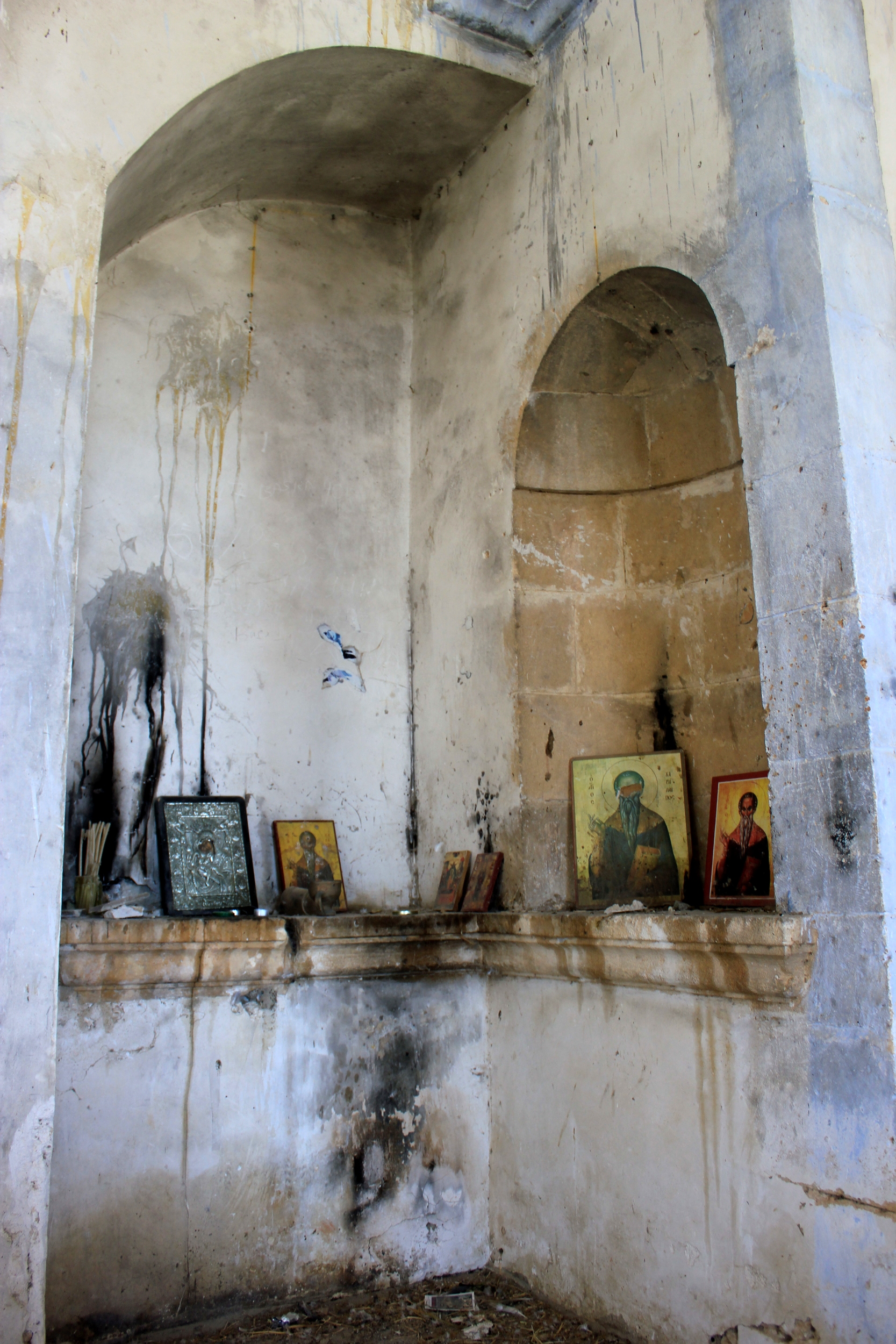
Iconostasis in the corner

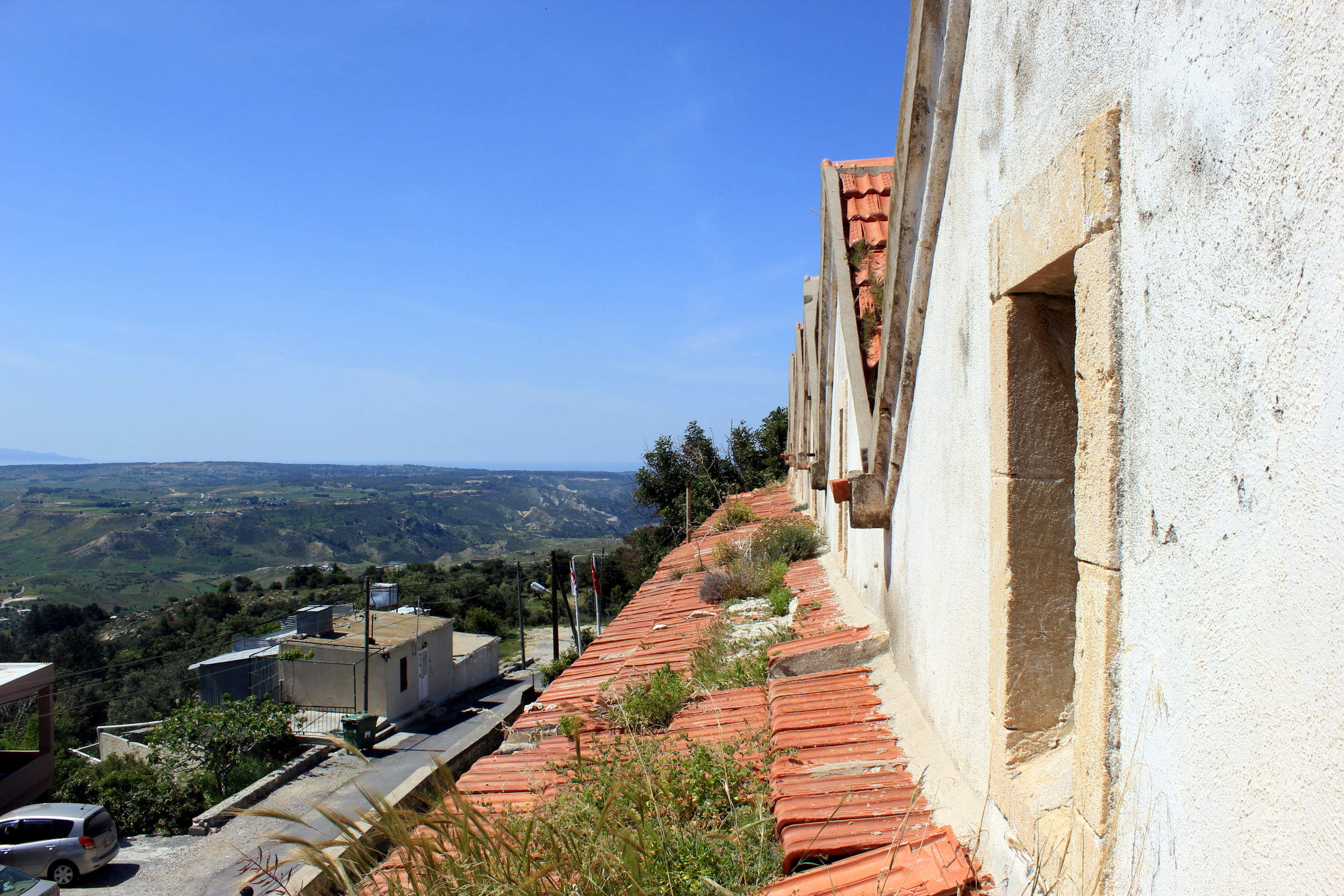
View from clock tower
