= Agia Eirini, Kyrenia =

Agia Eirini: Αγία Ειρήνη (Greek); Akdeniz (Turkish)
- Location in Cyprus
- Coordinates: 35°17′13″N 32°58′6″E
- Country (de jure): Cyprus
  - District: Kyrenia District
- Country (de facto): Northern Cyprus
  - District: Girne District
- Time zone: UTC+2 (EET)
  - Summer (DST): UTC+3 (EEST)

Agia Eirini or Agia Irini (Greek: Αγία Ειρήνη, Turkish: Akdeniz) is a village located on Morphou Bay, approximately 10 km north of Morphou. The village is located within Kyrenia District. It is under the de facto control of Northern Cyprus.

== Climate ==
Climate data for Agia Erini, Kyrenia (Akdeniz), 2017-2024 normals
Month	Jan	Feb	Mar	Apr	May	Jun	Jul	Aug	Sep	Oct	Nov	Dec	Year
Mean daily maximum °C (°F)	16.5 (61.7)	17.2 (63.0)	19.0 (66.2)	23.1 (73.6)	27.5 (81.5)	30.3 (86.5)	34.2 (93.6)	33.0 (91.4)	31.0 (87.8)	27.8 (82.0)	23.2 (73.8)	19.1 (66.4)	25.2 (77.3)
Daily mean °C (°F)	12.6 (54.7)	12.9 (55.2)	14.4 (57.9)	18.0 (64.4)	22.1 (71.8)	25.4 (77.7)	28.8 (83.8)	28.2 (82.8)	26.2 (79.2)	22.8 (73.0)	18.8 (65.8)	15.1 (59.2)	20.4 (68.8)
Mean daily minimum °C (°F)	8.8 (47.8)	8.5 (47.3)	9.9 (49.8)	12.9 (55.2)	16.8 (62.2)	20.4 (68.7)	23.4 (74.1)	23.4 (74.1)	21.4 (70.5)	17.8 (64.0)	14.3 (57.7)	11.2 (52.2)	15.7 (60.3)
Average precipitation mm (inches)	98.1 (3.86)	43.9 (1.73)	28.7 (1.13)	10.0 (0.39)	7.6 (0.30)	0.2 (0.01)	0.0 (0.0)	0.9 (0.04)	0.1 (0.00)	15.8 (0.62)	43.0 (1.69)	69.6 (2.74)	317.9 (12.51)
Average precipitation days (≥ 0.1 mm)	13.9	8.5	9.9	2.8	2.4	0.8	0	0.1	0.1	3.1	6.9	10.8	59.3
Source: Meteomanz

== Archaeological Excavations ==
The excavation at Agia Eirini. Papa Prokopios and workers.

The Swedish Cyprus Expedition, led by Einar Gjerstad, excavated Agia Eirini during november 1929.

During the summer of 1929, the Swedish Cyprus Expedition was visited by the priest Papa Prokopios. Prokopios had caught a looter on his field at the village of Agia Eirini. He decided to visit the museum in Nicosia and brought the upper part of a terracotta statue from the beginning of the sixth century B.C. with him. Thereafter, the Swedish Cyprus Expedition obtained the excavation rights and commenced an excavation on Prokopios' field. The site turned out to be an undisturbed sanctuary that was used since the Late Bronze Age, (Late Cypriote III), 1200 B.C, and lasted until the end of the Cypro-Archaic period. The most important period is dated to 650-500 B.C. since most of the finds discovered were from that time. They found 2000 figures half a meter under the sandy soil. The figures were lying and standing, grouped in the form of a semicircle, reminiscent of a theatre. The figures depicted priests, warriors, and ordinary people. Some bring offerings, dance or play musical instruments. Chariots with horses and bulls were found as well. The statues are of different sizes, the biggest one is life-sized. One of them is called the sacrificial priest and he wears a long robe and a turban. According to the excavators, he probably held a sacrificial knife in his raised left hand.

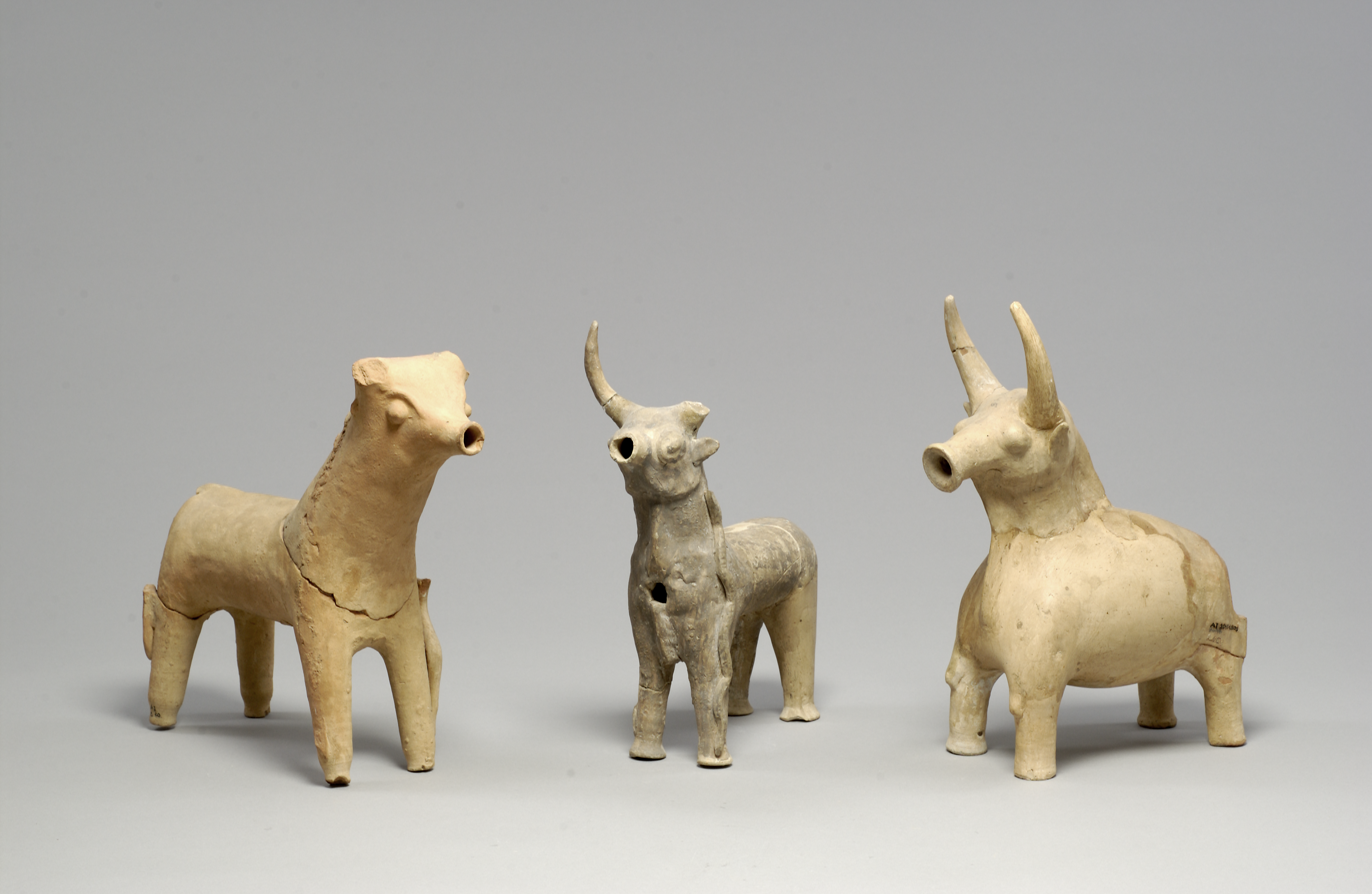
Three terracotta bulls from Agia Eirini. Can be seen at Medelhavsmuseet, Stockholm.

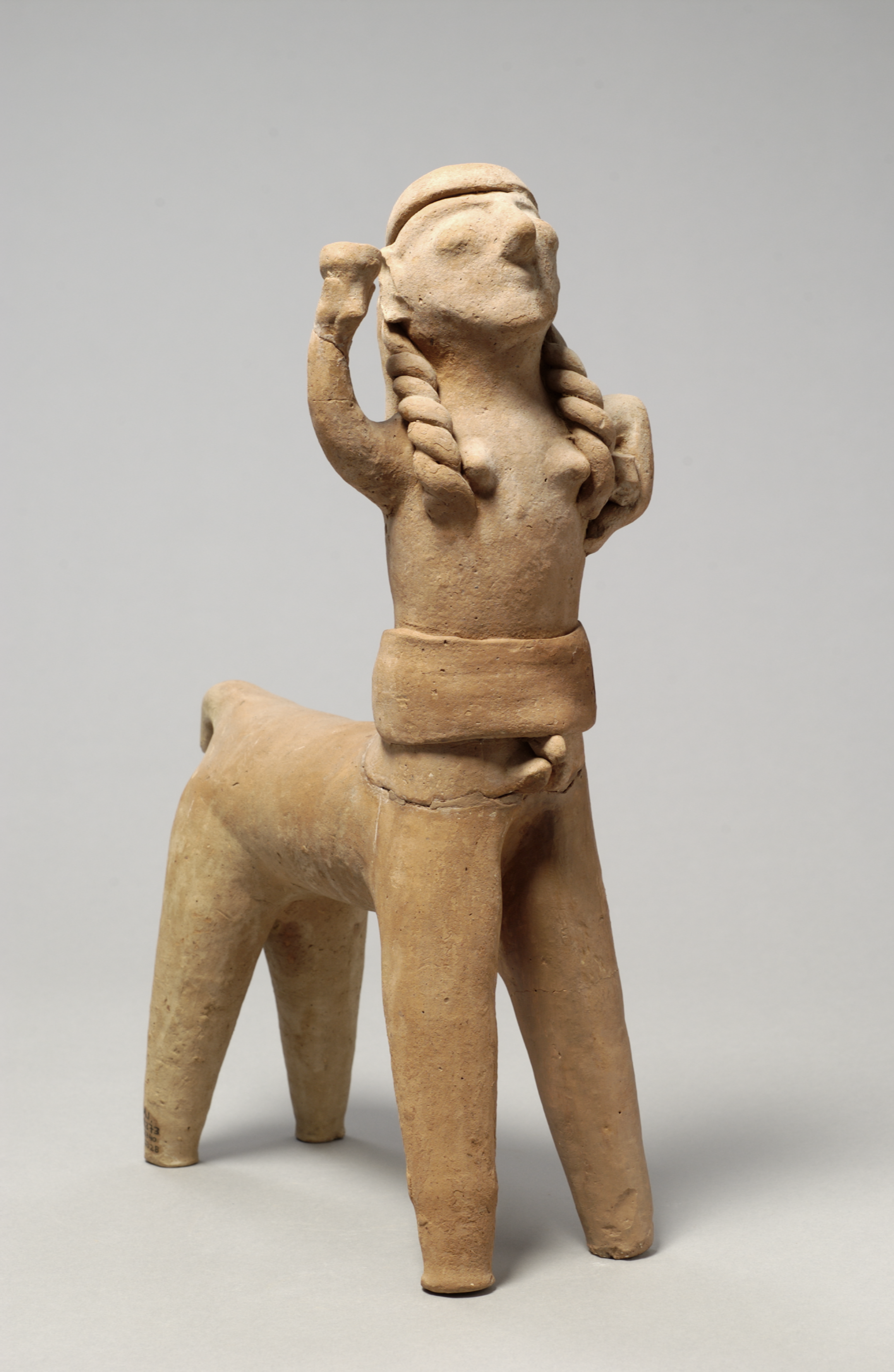
Terracotta centaur figurine with male genital organs and female breasts. Agia Eirini. Can be seen at Medelhavsmuseet, Stockholm.

In the beginning, the sanctuary consisted of a complex of rectangular houses with walls built of mud brick on solid stone foundations of rubble. The houses are isolated along the sides of a large open court. It seems like the western and northern houses were used by the priests as living rooms as well as storerooms. The central and southern houses were probably used for cult purposes with the central house being the central cult house. It consists of two rooms and all the cult objects were found here, for example offering tables, large pithoi, bowls, libation vases, a cult axe of stone, and a terracotta bull. The excavators had the impression that the cult was an agrarian one that worshipped deities who protected the crops and cattle and filled the store-rooms with corn, wine, olives, honey, and vegetables. Products of these kinds were probably offered to the deities among the other votive objects as well. The excavators did not find the official cult object but pointed out that the deity could have been worshipped in the shape of a bull, which is representative of the cult’s character of fertility since bulls are connected with fertility. The cult object could have been destroyed or removed. In the later temenos the cult object was an oval stone and this sacred stone, or betyl, could have been the cult object in the earlier cult as well and then moved to the new sanctuary.

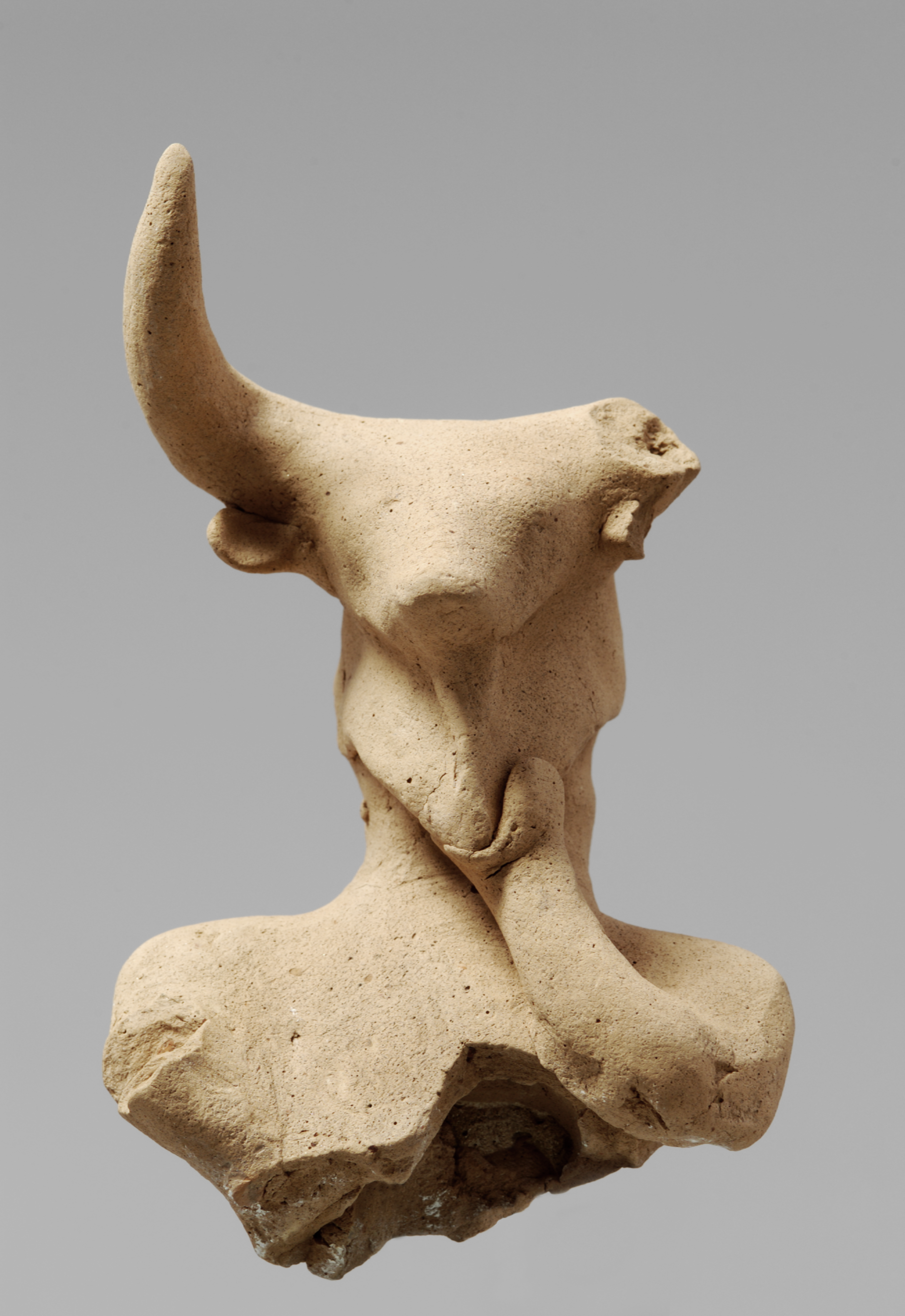
Terracotta figurine with a bull mask. Agia Eirini.

The old sanctuary was covered by red earth and a new one was erected on the top. This sanctuary was different from the first. Instead of a closed and roofed cult house with other buildings together creating a rectangular complex, the new sanctuary was an open temenos of irregular shape surrounded by a peribolos wall of red earth. A low altar was built in the temenos close to a libation table. The majority of the votive offerings from this period were terracotta bulls which were placed around the altar. The altar was covered with layers of ash, carbonized matter as well as animal bones. Therefore, the excavators concluded that the cult remained a fertility cult with a deity conceived in the shape of a bull. Furthermore, it seems like the cult began with blood sacrifices in this Geometric period. This sanctuary continued until the middle of Cypro-Geometric III when it changed again. The temenos area remained as before but the peribolos walls were heightened and a new, rectangular pillar was erected as the new altar. The old terracotta votives were moved to a deposit close to the new altar. During this period the motives of the votives changed as well. Animal statuettes remained, but minotaur statuettes and human figures appeared as well. Therefore some of the old types remained in combination with new modified types. Some of the bulls and minotaurs have snakes along their neck and back. The snake can be seen as a fertility symbol. Further, the deity worshipped became more anthropomorphic around this period. The human figures can be interpreted as the worshippers themselves. The armed figures and chariot statuettes might imply that the god was a god of war as well as fertility.

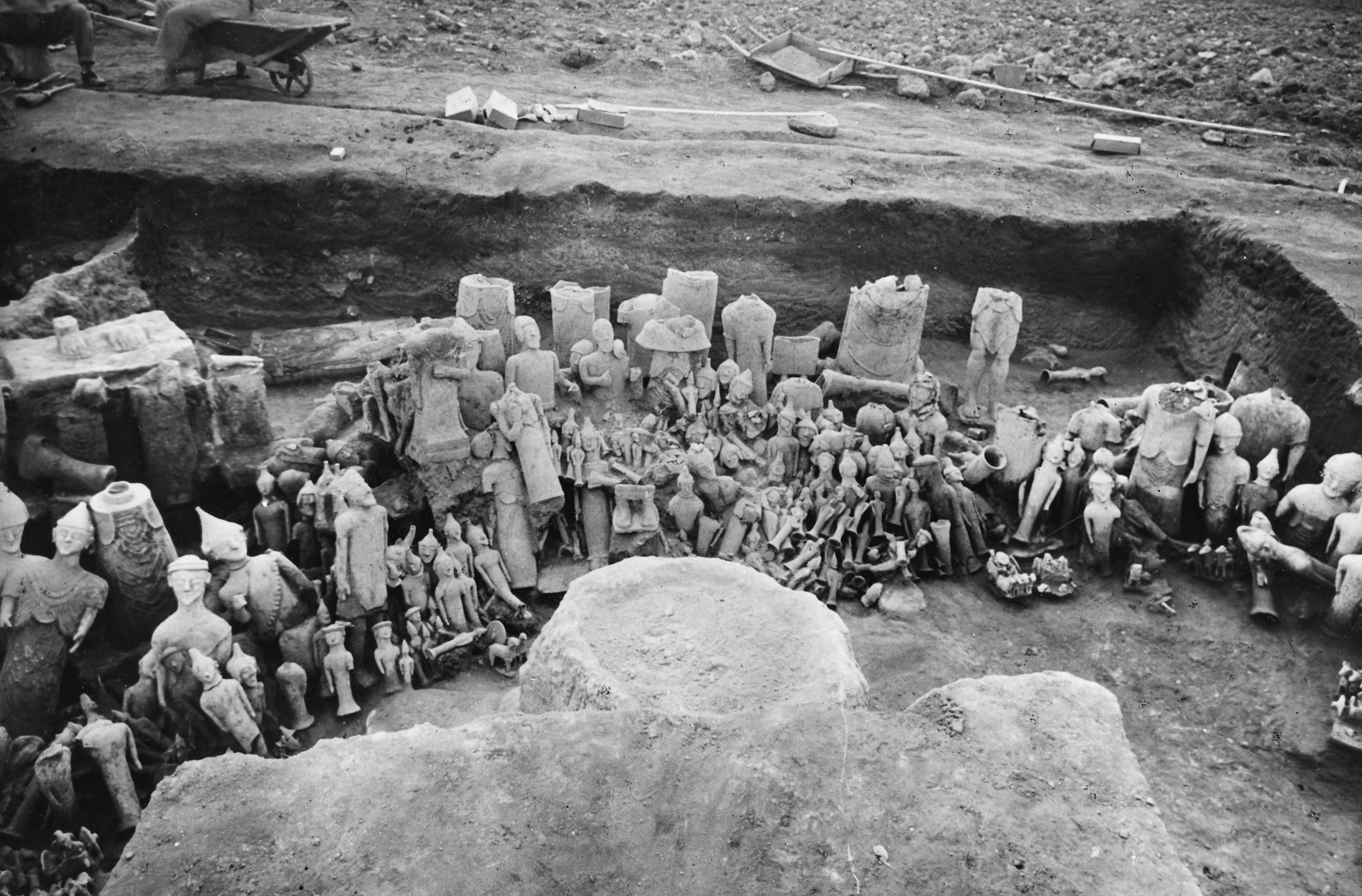
From the excavations of the Swedish Cyprus Expedition.

During the middle of the Cypro-archaic I period, a new temenos was again placed on top of the old one. The cult continued as before which the continuity of the votives, which were moved to the new sanctuary, displayed. This period is the great period of the Agia Eirini sanctuary. The same altar as before was used but the temenos were widened. A new peribolos was built around this bigger sanctuary. Two buildings were erected in the south and seem to have been used as enclosures for sacred trees, similar to the Minoan enclosures. Because the excavators found figures with bull’s masks these were interpreted as priests, which may be a clue to how at least some of the cult’s rituals were performed. Further, many figurines with tambourines and flutes indicate that music was an important feature of the cult. The votives consist mostly of terracotta statues of different sizes which were arranged around the altar in semicircles. The smallest ones were placed nearest the altar and the larger statutes in the back.

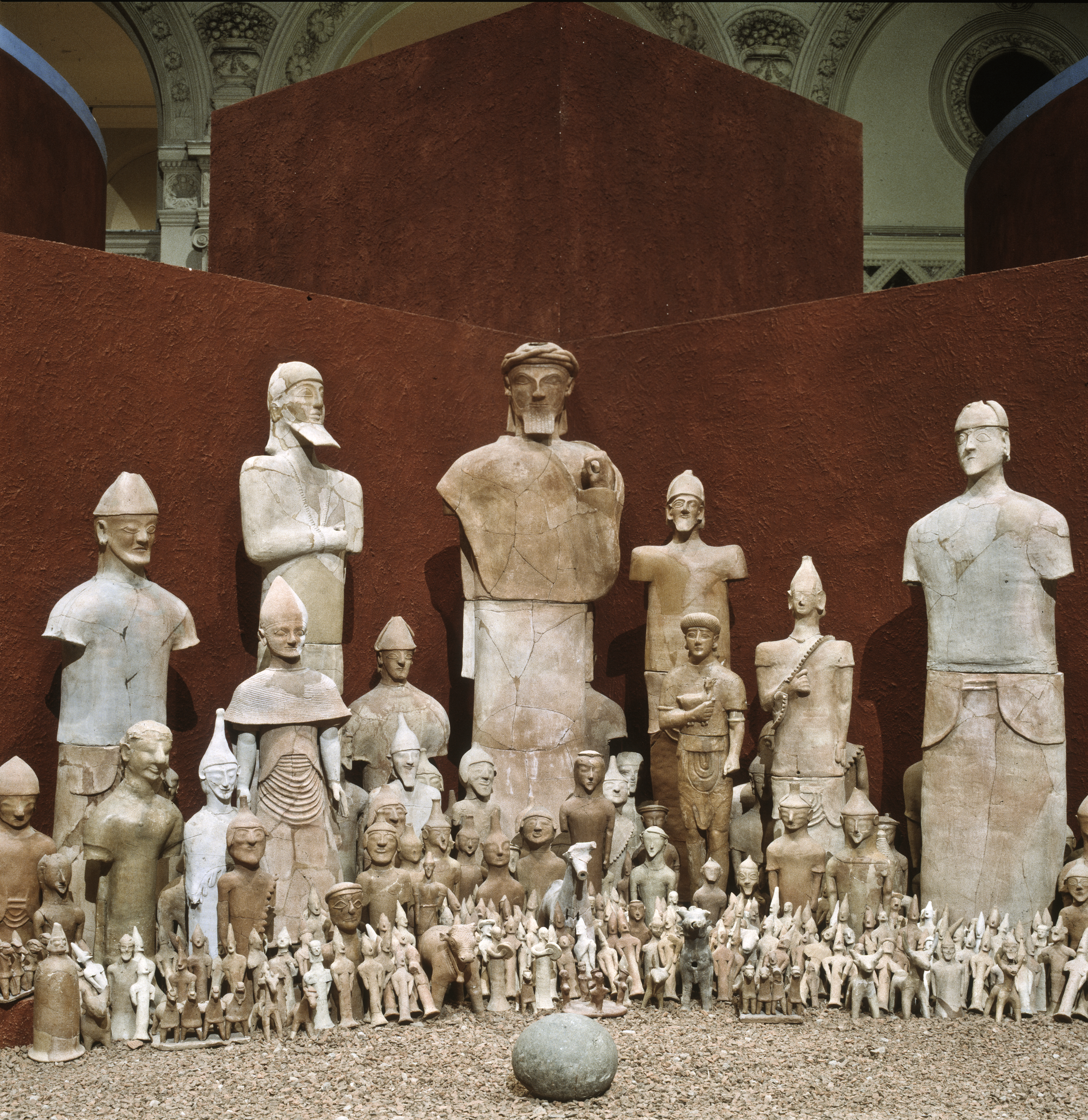
Photograph from one of the Cyprus Exhibitions at Medelhavsmuseet with the terracotta sculptures and the betyl (stone) from Agia Eirini.

At the beginning of Cypro-Archaic II the sanctuary was flooded and covered with a layer of sand and gravel, which made some smaller changes to the sanctuary although the cult recovered. Later, the sanctuary was flooded again, and again. At the beginning of the final phase of Cypro-Archaic, 510-500 B.C. the flood was so severe that the sanctuary was abandoned. During the 1st century B.C., a revival of the cult took place, but this was a much smaller and poorer cult that did not leave many remains behind. Much later, a small church for Ayia Irini (Holy Peace) was built on the same site. Later, in modern times, the sanctuary was forgotten and became a field until the day when Papa Prokopios realized that he had grown his corn on top of ancient terracotta sculptures.

On the other side of the valley, there is a necropolis with rock-cut tombs. The earliest tombs here are from the Cypro-Geometric period and the latest are from Roman times. Further down, close to the sea, the ruins of a small ancient town are situated. The earliest of the datable finds observed here are from the Hellenistic period.
