= Trimithi =

Trimithi: Τριμίθι (Greek); Edremit (Turkish)
- Village
- Location in Cyprus
- Coordinates: 35°19′43″N 33°15′33″E
- Country (de jure): Cyprus
  - District: Kyrenia District
- Country (de facto): Northern Cyprus
  - District: Girne District

Population (2011)
  - Total: 1,268
- Time zone: UTC+2 (EET)
  - Summer (DST): UTC+3 (EEST)

Trimithi (Greek: Τριμίθι; Turkish: Edremit) is a small village in Cyprus, located 6 km west of Kyrenia. De facto, it is under the control of Northern Cyprus. Its population in 2011 was 1,268.
