= Agios Ermolaos =

Agios Ermolaos: Άγιος Ερμόλαος (Greek); Şirinevler (Turkish)
- Village
- Location in Cyprus
- Coordinates: 35°16′39″N 33°10′19″E
- Country (de jure): Cyprus
  - District: Kyrenia District
- Country (de facto): Northern Cyprus
  - District: Girne District

Population (2011)
  - Total: 368
- Time zone: UTC+2 (EET)
  - Summer (DST): UTC+3 (EEST)

Agios Ermolaos (Greek: Άγιος Ερμόλαος, Turkish: Şirinevler) is a village in Cyprus, 5 km east of Kontemenos. It is under the de facto control of Northern Cyprus.

All of the Agios Ermolaos Greek Cypriots fled before the Turkish army and were displaced as a consequence of the Turkish Invasion of Cyprus in 1974. Formerly enclaved, displaced Turkish Cypriots from the south of the island and Turks from mainland Turkey subsequently moved to this village and it was named Şirinevler in Turkish in 1975.
