= Kömürcü =

Kiomourtzou: Κιομουρτζιού (Greek); Kömürcü (Turkish)
- Village
- Location in Cyprus
- Coordinates: 35°17′33″N 33°15′25″E
- Country (de jure): Cyprus
  - District: Kyrenia District
- Country (de facto): Northern Cyprus
  - District: Girne District

Population (2011)
  - Total: 67
- Time zone: UTC+2 (EET)
  - Summer (DST): UTC+3 (EEST)

Kiomourtzou (Greek: Κιομουρτζιού; Turkish: Kömürcü) is a small village in Cyprus located along the main Kyrenia–Nicosia highway. De facto, it is under the control of Northern Cyprus. Its population in 2011 was 67.
