= Kyrenia District =

District of Cyprus

Coordinates: 35°15′N 33°16′E

Kyrenia District Επαρχία Κερύνειας (Greek) Girne kazası (Turkish)
- District
- Location of the district in Cyprus
- Country: Cyprus
- Capital: Kyrenia

Area
  - Total: 643.9 km^{2} (248.6 sq mi)
- Time zone: UTC+2 (EET)
  - Summer (DST): UTC+3 (EEST)
- Post code: 9000-9999
- Area code: +357 27 (Note: Due to the fact that the district is controlled in its entirety by the de facto state of Northern Cyprus, the area code for the Kyrenia District cannot be verified, though it is believed to be +357 27. (see page))

The Kyrenia District, (Note: Greek: Επαρχία Κερύνειας, romanized: Eparchía Kerínias [/éparxía kerínias/]; Turkish: Girne kazası) or simply Kyrenia, (Note: Greek: Κερύνεια, romanized: Kerýneia locally [t͡ʃeˈɾiɲˑa]; Turkish: Girne [ˈɟiɾne]) is one of the six districts of Cyprus. Its capital city is Kyrenia. It is the smallest of Cyprus's districts, and is the only one controlled in its entirety by the unrecognised de facto state of Northern Cyprus, where the same territory is administered as the de facto Girne District, a distinct entity.

It is bordered on the south by Nicosia District and on the east and south-east by Famagusta District. It includes much of the north coast, with the towns of Kyrenia, Lapethos and Karavas. Also the Kyrenia Mountains, which overlook the coast, with the prominent castles of St. Hilarion and Buffavento.

Unlike the portions of Nicosia, Famagusta and Larnaca under Occupied Cyprus' control, which are variously partitioned into five of its six districts, the boundaries of Cyprus's de jure Kyrenia District are coterminous with Northern Cyprus' de facto Girne District. A district administration-in-exile exists in the Republic of Cyprus-controlled part of the island, near Ledra Palace, while the TRNC district has a kaymakam.

== History ==
Under Lusignan and Venetian rule, Kyrenia District was known as the contrée (French) or contrade (Italian ) of Cérines, which was one of the eleven provinces of the Kingdom of Cyprus. At that time, the province of Nicosia, known as the Vicomté, extended closer to the sea, encroaching upon the Pentadaktylos foothills in the present Kyrenia District.

Kyrenia District 1878

Under Ottoman Turkish rule, Kyrenia was one of the six cazas into which the island was divided. The Caza of Kyrenia, was divided into three nahiehs – Kyrenia, Lefka and Morphou. The caza was headed by a Kaimakan. When the British took control of Cyprus in 1878, these administrative units were retained. But by 1881, Kyrenia Caza was reduced to one nahieh, namely Kyrenia, which covered roughly the same as its present area.

A British officer styled a Commissioner (later District Officer) was appointed for the Caza, while the Turkish Kaimakan was initially retained with certain of his functions.

In 1881 the Caza and Nahieh of Kyrenia had a population of 13,266, (Greek 75%, Turkish 20%), representing 7% of the population of Cyprus. By 1960 the population had grown to 31,015 (Greek 79%, Turkish 14%, Maronite 6%). The Maronite population was almost entirely located in the villages of Kormakiti, Asomatos and Karpaseia.

== Settlements ==
According to Statistical Codes of Municipalities, Communities and Quarters of Cyprus per the Statistical Service of Cyprus (2015), Kyrenia District has 3 municipalities and 44 communities. Municipalities are written with bold.

- Agia Eirini
- Agios Amvrosios
- Agios Epiktitos
- Agios Ermolaos
- Agios Georgios
- Agirda
- Agridaki
- Asomatos
- Bellapais
- Charkeia
- Diorios
- Elia
- Fotta
- Ftericha
- Kalograia
- Kampyli
- Karakoumi
- Karavas
- Karmi
- Karpaseia
- Kato Dikomo
- Kazafani
- Kiomourtzou
- Klepini
- Kontemenos
- Kormakitis
- Koutsovendis
- Krini
- Kyrenia
- Lapithos
- Larnakas tis Lapithou
- Livera
- Motides
- Myrtou
- Orga
- Palaiosofos
- Panagra
- Pano Dikomo
- Pileri
- Sychari
- Sysklipos
- Templos
- Thermeia
- Trapeza
- Trimithi
- Vasileia
- Vouno
