= Panagra, Cyprus =

Panagra: Πάναγρα (Greek); Geçitköy (Turkish)
- Location in Cyprus
- Coordinates: 35°20′10.78″N 33°4′5.4″E
- Country (de jure): Cyprus
  - District: Kyrenia District
- Country (de facto): Northern Cyprus
  - District: Girne District

Population (2011)
  - Total: 220
- Time zone: UTC+2 (EET)
  - Summer (DST): UTC+3 (EEST)

Panagra (Greek: Πάναγρα; Turkish: Geçitköy) is a village in Cyprus, located about 23 km west of Kyrenia. De facto, it is under the control of Northern Cyprus. Its population in 2011 was 220.
