= Karpaseia =

Karpaseia: Kαρπάσια (Greek); Karpaşa (Turkish)
- Location within Cyprus
- Coordinates: 35°17′52″N 33°04′16″E
- Country (de jure): Cyprus
  - District: Kyrenia District
- Country (de facto): Northern Cyprus
  - District: Girne District

Population (2011)
  - Total: 89
- Time zone: UTC+2 (EET)
  - Summer (DST): UTC+3 (EEST)

Karpaseia or Karpasha (Greek: Kαρπάσια [locally [kar̥ˈpaʃa]]; Turkish: Karpaşa) is a village in Cyprus, 2 km south of Myrtou. De facto, it is under the control of Northern Cyprus.

Karpaseia is the smallest village in population amongst the Maronite villages. In 1778, there were 99 inhabitants; in 1973, they numbered 245. Today, only eleven enclaved Maronites remain in Karpaseia, the rest having fled to the south during the 1974 Turkish invasion.

The village church is dedicated to the Holy Cross. Inside the church, there are remnants of wall paintings. The icons date from the 17th century. There are also two ancient wooden crosses of great value: one is Byzantine and dates from the 15th century; the other is rustic Cypriot-Byzantine and dates from the 17th century. The two crosses constitute one of the most important possessions of the Maronite community, which celebrates the protector of the village on 14 September, the day on which St. Helen is said to have found the Holy Cross (14 September 320 A.C.).
