= Asomatos, Kyrenia =

Asomatos: Ασώματος (Greek); Özhan (Turkish)
- Location of Asomatos in Cyprus
- Coordinates: 35°16′33″N 33°06′25″E
- Country (de jure): Cyprus
  - District: Kyrenia District
- Country (de facto): Northern Cyprus
  - District: Girne District

Population (2011)
  - Total: 73
- Time zone: UTC+2 (EET)
  - Summer (DST): UTC+3 (EEST)

Asomatos (Greek: Ασώματος (Κερύνειας); Turkish: Özhan) is a village near Myrtou in northern Cyprus. It is under the de facto control of Northern Cyprus.

Asomatos was the second largest Maronite village after Kormakitis. Before the 1974 Turkish invasion of Cyprus, its inhabitants numbered 527, whereas, todaynone.

The village is used as a military camp by the Turkish army. The Maronites may visit the village only on Sundays, with limited time restrictions, for mass in the Church of St. Michael the Archangel.
