= Karavas =

Karavas: Καραβάς (Greek); Alsancak (Turkish)
- Municipality
- Location in Cyprus
- Coordinates: 35°20′50″N 33°12′28″E
- Country (de jure): Cyprus
  - District: Kyrenia District
- Country (de facto): Northern Cyprus
  - District: Girne District

Population (2011)
  - Total: 6,597
- Time zone: UTC+2 (EET)
  - Summer (DST): UTC+3 (EEST)
- Website: LAC Turkish municipality

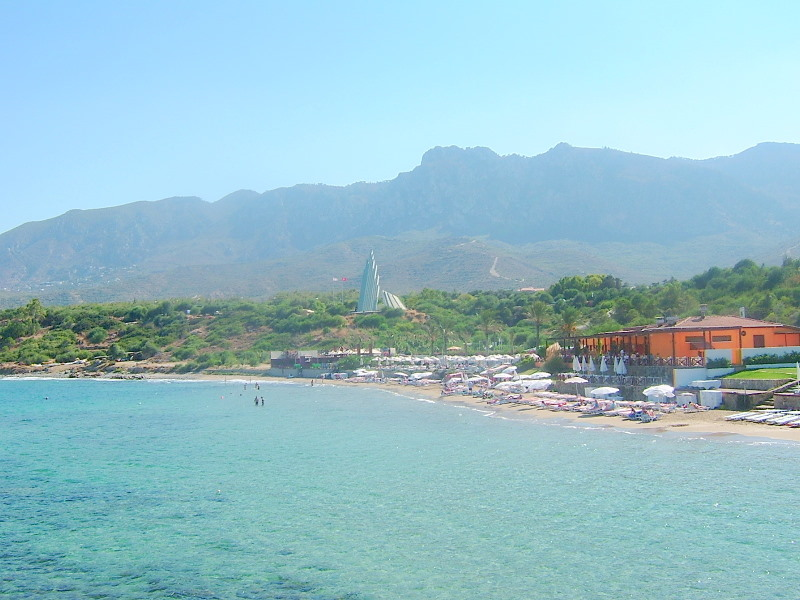
Beach in Karavas (Alsancak), Kyrenia

Karavas (Greek: Καραβάς; Turkish: Alsancak) is a town in the north of the Cyprus island. It is under the de facto control of Northern Cyprus. As of 2011, the town has a population of 6,597.

== Etymology ==
The name Karavas comes from the Greek karávi (καράβι), meaning "ship". The name Alsancak comes from the two Turkish words Al, meaning "Red" and 'Sancak meaning "flag".

== History ==
Prior to the Turkish invasion in 1974, Karavas had a Greek population of approximately 2200. Karavas was captured by the Turkish Army before the second Turkish invasion of Cyprus after July 20, 1974. The city was attacked on August 6, during the so-called armistice. All Greek Cypriot inhabitants were forced out of Karavas by Turkish military forces and have become refugees, living in Cyprus and abroad. Following the population exchange assisted by the United Nations where the Turkish Cypriots forced from their villages in the South were transported to the safety of the North, today the village is home mostly to those Turkish Cypriots displaced from their original village Mandria in the Paphos region left in the south of the island.

The Turkish Cypriot municipality Alsancak was founded in 1974.

"Pente Mili" is one of the most beautiful beaches in Karavas.

The Cyprus Treasure, an impressive collection of silver vessels, dishes, spoons and jewelry, was found here in 1902 and 1917. It can be found in the British Museum in London, Metropolitan Museum of Art in New York City and the Cyprus Museum in Nicosia.

== Notable people ==
Karavas is the birthplace of the Cypriot-American organic chemist K. C. Nicolaou.

== International relations ==
=== Twin towns – sister cities ===
Karavas is twinned with:

- Karavas, Cythera, Greece (since 1997)
- Bornova, İzmir, Turkey (since 2011)
- Gazipaşa, Antalya, Turkey (since 2015)
