= Kormakitis =

Village in Kyrenia District, Cyprus

Kormakitis: Kurmajit (Cypriot Arabic); Κορμακίτης (Greek); Kormacit, Koruçam (Turkish)
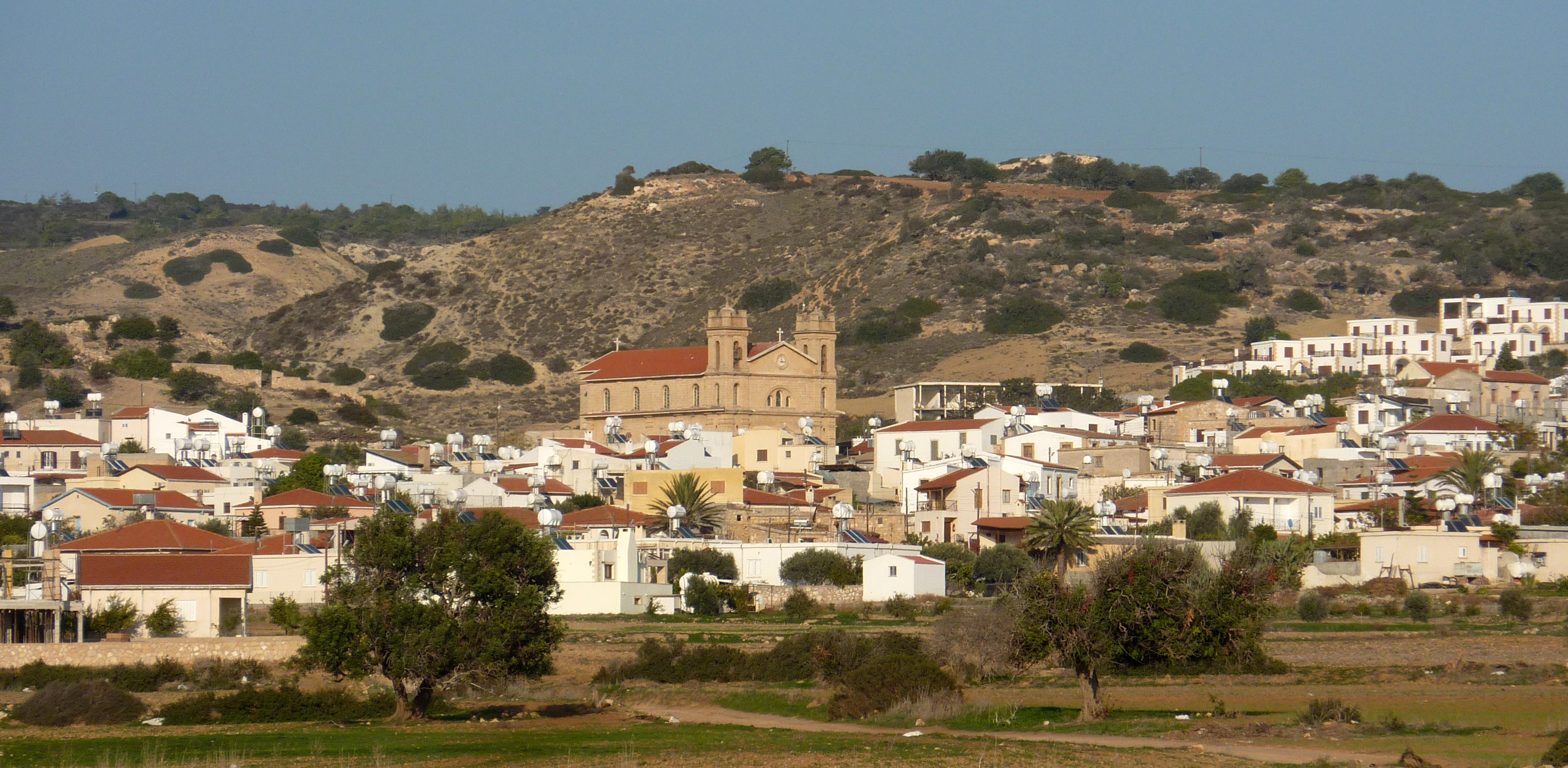

- Location within Cyprus
- Coordinates: 35°20′34″N 33°00′39″E
- Country: Cyprus (de jure); Northern Cyprus (de facto)
  - District: Kyrenia District
- Elevation: 168 m (551 ft)

Population (2011)
  - Total: 309

Kormakitis (Cypriot Arabic: Kurmajit; Greek: Κορμακίτης, Kormakítis; Turkish: Kormacit or Koruçam) is a small village in Cyprus. It is under the de facto control of Northern Cyprus. Kormakitis is one of four traditionally Maronite villages in Cyprus, the other three being Asomatos, Agia Marina and Karpaseia. The Maronites of Kormakitis traditionally speak their own variety of Arabic called Cypriot Maronite Arabic (CMA) in addition to Greek and recently Turkish, and they follow the Catholic Maronite Church. Cape Kormakitis is named after the village.

All of the remaining Maronite villagers are elderly. The Republic of Cyprus government gives those who stayed in the north pensions of $670 a month per couple and around $430 for an individual. It also pays instructors to teach CMA, and funds week-long summer visits by young Maronites to put them in touch with their communal roots. Maronites also receive help from the United Nations. Every two weeks UN troops make the trip from Nicosia to deliver food, water, fuel and medical supplies across the border to the north's Maronite population. The UN aid convoy is composed of soldiers from the 12 Regiment Royal Artillery. Aid is funded by the Republic of Cyprus government but is delivered by the UN.

During the weekends the population of Kormakitis increases to more than 600 as displaced former residents return to visit relatives and celebrate Mass. Access has been made easier since 2003 when the Turkish Cypriot authorities relaxed rules on visits to Northern Cyprus. Many Maronites who were displaced from Kormakitis have renovated and upgraded the village and homes for weekend use.

== Etymology ==
There are several versions for the name of the village. The most common instance of folk etymology is related to the Maronites who arrived from Kour, Batroun. Feeling nostalgic, they used to repeat the sentence "Nahni jina wa Kour ma jit" "We came (to Cyprus) but Kour hasn't come". Another instance of folk etymology is related to the Phoenician settlement of Kormia. The present village would take its name from the expression Kormia jdide, or "New Kormia". These hypotheses seem consistent with the pronunciation of the village in Cypriot Greek (Κορματζίτης /Korma'dʒitis/) and Cypriot Turkish (Kormacit /Korma'dʒit/). The standard Greek name Kormakitis is an attempt to adjust the name to standard Greek pronunciation, whereas the new Turkish name Koruçam was made up after 1974 for political reasons.

== History ==
=== Middle Ages ===
Originally from Lebanon and Syria, today's Maronite community in Cyprus was shaped by four successive waves of emigration that started in the 8th century. With the Islamic conquests radiating outward from the Arab Peninsula, many Maronites abandoned Syria and Lebanon and settled in Cyprus. In 938, the destruction of St Maron's Monastery in Lebanon prompted a second wave of refugees. Another three centuries passed and Crusader king Guy of Lusignan purchased Cyprus from Richard the Lionheart, leading the former to import Maronite warriors to the island to protect its coastlines. The last wave of emigration came 100 years later when Acre, last outpost of the Crusader edifice, collapsed leading to the last migration of Maronites to Cyprus. Kormakitis was originally built near Cape Kormakitis, but because of raids the village was moved to its current location. The new location of the village was chosen because it provided better protection against raids and contained an ample supply of water and lush vegetation for agriculture and livestock. During the period of 1191–1489, the village of Kormakitis was one of the richest fiefs of the island, which belonged to the French feudal Denores. The Maronites at the time held 60 villages with a reported number of 60,000 and was the second largest community after the Greek Cypriots. In 1570, Kormakitis had 850 inhabitants.

The Governor of Cyprus (Sir Hugh Foot) and his wife on an official visit to Kormakitis with the Vicar General of the Maronites.

=== Ottoman and British administration ===
During the Ottoman rule of Cyprus, the number of residences decreased; in 1841, there were only 200 inhabitants. Villagers who remained were highly taxed and harassed by Ottoman Turks and Greek Cypriots alike. The number of Maronites across Cyprus decreased simultaneously: In 1572, there were between 7,000 and 8,000 Maronites, living in 23 villages, while, in 1596, there were 4.000 Maronites, living in 19 villages. Under the British administration in Cyprus, the Maronite Community was promoted by the British government, whose policy was to support minorities. This resulted in better living conditions for the population of Kormakitis. By 1910, Kormakitis relied on agriculture and livestock, which produced grain, olives, beans, cotton, cocoons and other crops.

=== Contemporary era ===
After Cyprus gained independence in 1960, projects were carried out within the village. In 1962, the village school was constructed, which was able to enrol 210 students and employ seven teachers. In 1965, the village was connected to the electric grid and houses were connected to water mains for the first time.

Following years of intercommunal violence, on 15 July 1974, there was an attempted coup d'état led by the Greek military junta to unite the island with Greece. The coup ousted president Makarios III and replaced him with pro-enosis nationalist Nikos Sampson. On 20 July 1974, the Turkish army invaded the island in response to the coup d'état. Despite the restoration of constitutional order and the return of Archbishop Makarios III to Cyprus in December 1974, the Turkish troops remained on the island occupying the northeastern portion of the island. This resulted in the island being divided into its Greek and Turkish Cypriot communities respectively. Many of Kormakitis's residents choose to migrate to the internationally recognised Republic of Cyprus.

Before the Turkish invasion of Cyprus, Kormakitis had around 1,000 inhabitants. The number of Maronites has since decreased. It is estimated that between 100 and 165 Maronites remained in the TRNC. The decline in population has been attributed to a lack of jobs and secondary education, leading to migration, migrating mainly to Nicosia and Limassol. During the school year 1999–2000, the Kormakitis Primary School was forced to close down, due to a lack of pupils, providing evidence of Kormakitis's declining young population.

In 2006, TRNC officials announced that Maronites from the village of Kormakitis have been given an opportunity to return to the village. This has been made possible by the fact that the houses and properties in question at Kormakitis, were not seized by Turkish settlers and Turkish Cypriots during the aftermath of the Turkish invasion of Cyprus. However, the Maronites have to meet a certain criteria. Firstly, they need to be the legitimate owner of a house or property in the village to be allowed to resettle. Secondly, they also have to move back to the village and reside there. Maronites are not allowed to reclaim their property and then commute to and from Kormakitis to the Republic of Cyprus controlled areas. Some 40 people, mainly elderly couples, meanwhile, have permanently resettled in the village.

== Climate ==
Kormakitis has a hot, semi-arid climate with long, dry and hot summers and cool winters with mixed weather of sunny spells and rain.

Climate data for Kormakitis
| Month | Jan | Feb | Mar | Apr | May | Jun | Jul | Aug | Sep | Oct | Nov | Dec | Year |
|---|---|---|---|---|---|---|---|---|---|---|---|---|---|
| Mean daily maximum °C (°F) | 14 (57) | 15 (59) | 18.5 (65.3) | 23.5 (74.3) | 28.5 (83.3) | 32.5 (90.5) | 35.5 (95.9) | 35 (95) | 32.5 (90.5) | 27.5 (81.5) | 22 (72) | 16.5 (61.7) | 25 (77) |
| Daily mean °C (°F) | 10 (50) | 10.5 (50.9) | 12.5 (54.5) | 16.5 (61.7) | 21.5 (70.7) | 25.5 (77.9) | 28 (82) | 28 (82) | 25 (77) | 21 (70) | 16 (61) | 11.5 (52.7) | 18 (64) |
| Mean daily minimum °C (°F) | 6 (43) | 6 (43) | 7 (45) | 8.5 (47.3) | 15 (59) | 18 (64) | 20 (68) | 20.5 (68.9) | 18 (64) | 15 (59) | 10.5 (50.9) | 7 (45) | 12 (54) |
Source: www.in.weather.com

== Demographics ==
| Year | Maronites | Greek Cypriots | Turkish Cypriots | Total | Notes |
|---|---|---|---|---|---|
| 1570 | Not available | Not available | Not available | 850 | |
| 1831 | 91 | - | - | 91 | Male population only |
| 1841 | Not available | Not available | Not available | 200 | |
| 1891 | 423 | - | 7 | 430 | |
| 1901 | 503 | - | 10 | 513 | |
| 1911 | 617 | - | 11 | 628 | |
| 1921 | 666 | - | 10 | 676 | |
| 1931 | 730 | - | 6 | 736 | |
| 1946 | 889 | 5 | - | 894 | |
| 1960 | 1093 | 18 | - | 1111 | |
| 1973 | 1257 | - | - | 1257 | |
| 1996 | 220 | - | - | 220 | De jure population, including other nationals |
| 2006 | 195 | - | - | 195 | De jure population, including other nationals |

== Architecture ==
=== Churches ===
Several churches and chapels have been built within Kormakitis and the surrounding fields. These churches and chapels belong to the Maronite Church, a denomination of the Catholic Church. Saint George's Church, located within Kormakitis was built in 1930. Devoted to the patron saint of the village the Church, construction started in 1900. The designs and plans of the church were prepared by the Maltese architect Fenec and the Maltese civil engineer Cafiero. The inhabitants of the village offered donations for the construction of the church. The church constituted as the official church of the Maronite Church of Cyprus, prior to 1974. Today, Saint George's Church is used by the remaining inhabitants. Icons and religious items dating from the 12th century are located within the cathedral.

The Chapel of Saint George, often referred as Chapel of Saint George of the seeds, is a chapel situated near the Mediterranean Sea, north of Kormakitis. It was built in 1852. Every year, on 3 November, a Mass is celebrated by the Maronite Community dedicated to Saint George. This is done to coincide with the start of the agricultural season, the farmers pray to Saint George for a successful harvest. According to the tradition, after Mass, the Maronites have lunch by the sea to celebrate Saint George.

The Chapel of the Holy Virgin is a small chapel situated in the west of the village. The chapel was thought to have been built in 1453. Recently renovated it is frequently visited.

The Chapel of Saint George, often referred as Chapel of Saint George of the Nuns, is a chapel situated next to the monastery of the Franciscan sisters, in the center of the village. It was built in 1534 and was the first chapel to be built inside the village. The monastery of the Franciscan sisters was built in 1936, next to the village's square.

== See also ==
- Cypriot Maronite Arabic
- Maronites in Cyprus
- Maronite Church
- Rizokarpaso
