= Girne District =

District of Northern Cyprus

Coordinates: 35.2007°N 33.4474°E

Location of Girne District within Northern Cyprus.

Girne District (Turkish: Girne İlçesi) is one of six districts of Northern Cyprus. It is divided between two sub-districts: Girne Sub-district and the Çamlıbel Sub-district. Its capital is Kyrenia, also known by its Turkish name, as Girne. Its de facto population was 73,577 in the 2011 census. Its Governor is Mehmet Envergil. It has the same boundaries as the Kyrenia District of Cyprus, a distinct political entity and local government-in-exile which claims the same territory. Girne District is the only district of the Cyprus that is fully occupied by Northern Cyprus.

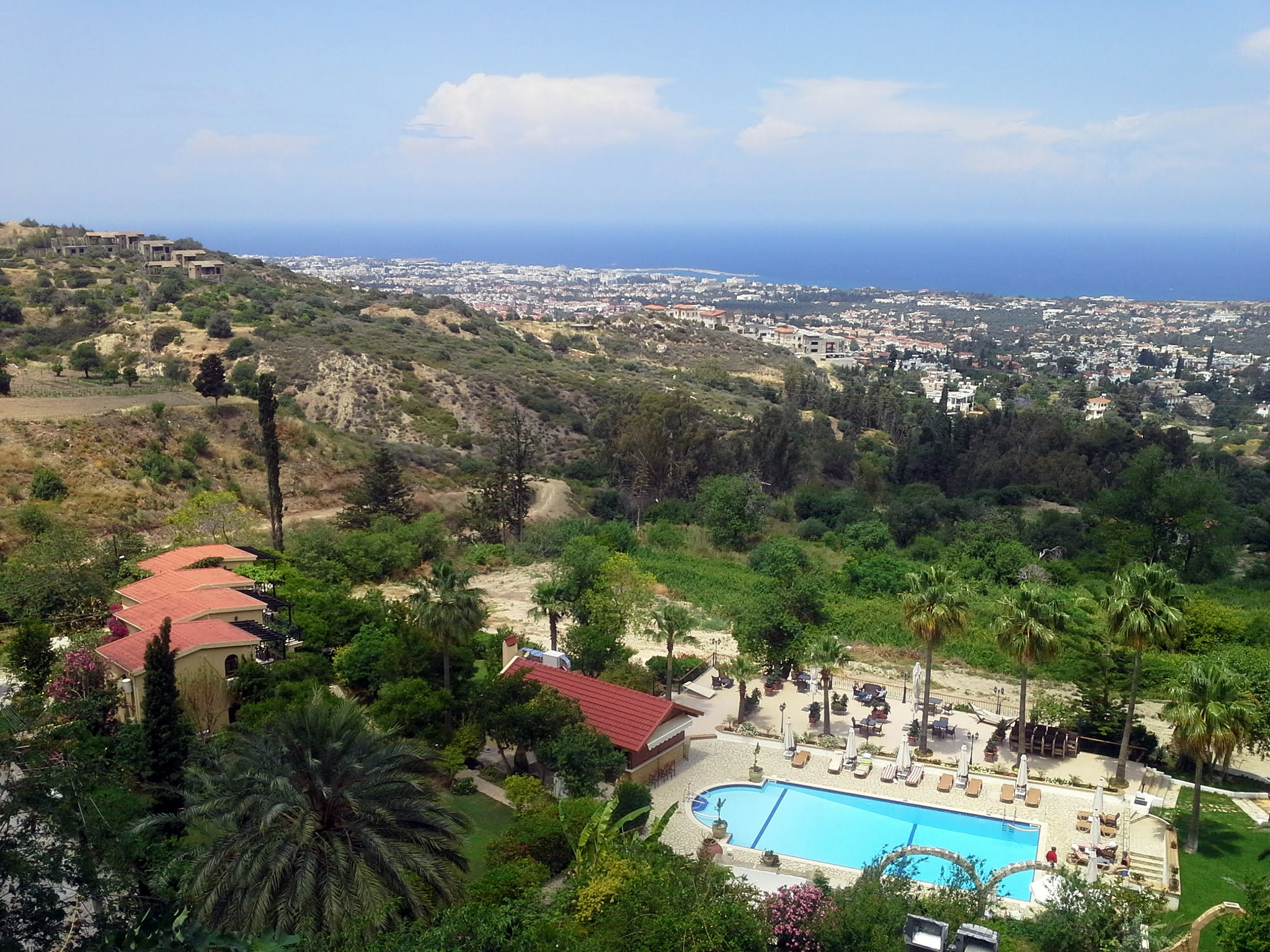
Girne District

== See also ==
- Districts of Cyprus
- Districts of Northern Cyprus
- Kyrenia District, the Cyprus political unit which claims the same physical territory
