= Agios Chariton =

Agios Chariton: Άγιος Χαρίτων (Greek); Ergenekon (Turkish)
- Location within Cyprus
- Coordinates: 35°18′18″N 33°36′15″E
- Country (de jure): Cyprus
  - District: Famagusta District
- Country (de facto): Northern Cyprus
  - District: Gazimağusa District

Population (2011)
  - Total: 96

Agios Chariton (Greek: Άγιος Χαρίτων "Saint Chariton"; Turkish: Ergenekon, previously Ayharita) is a small village in Cyprus. It is located 10 kilometres (6.2 mi) north of Marathovounos, on the south side of the Kyrenia mountain range. Agios Chariton is under the de facto control of Northern Cyprus. As of 2011, it had a population of 96. It has historically been a Turkish Cypriot village.
