= Assia, Cyprus =

Assia: Άσσια (Greek); Paşaköy (Turkish)
- Location in Cyprus
- Coordinates: 35°9′33″N 33°36′36″E
- Country (de jure): Cyprus
  - District: Famagusta District
- Country (de facto): Northern Cyprus
  - District: Gazimağusa District

Government
  - Mayor: Habil Tülücü

Population (2011)
  - Total: 3,561
- Time zone: UTC+2 (EET)
  - Summer (DST): UTC+3 (EEST)
- Website: Turkish Cypriot municipality

Assia (Greek: Άσσια, locally [ˈaʃːa]; (Note: Also transliterated Ashia or Asha.) Turkish: Paşaköy) is a village in the Famagusta District of Cyprus, located 6 km northwest of Vatili. It is under the de facto control of Northern Cyprus.

== History ==
Assia is located in the center of the Mesaoria valley. The village was recorded as early as the early 13th century in papal documents. Before 1974, the population of Assia was approximately 2,700. The village consisted of two parishes, St. John's and St. George's. The village had five churches: St. George, St. John Prodromos, St. Theodore, St. Spyridon and Virgin Mary. St. Spyridon was born in Assia and the church was built by Michael Kassialos, a folk artist from Assia. Assia was also well known for the craftsmanship of the embroidery made there. The main source of income in the area was farming and many agricultural products of Assia were sold to Nicosia's markets. Assia was also famous for its cucumbers.

In the August of 1974, during the Turkish invasion of Cyprus, Turkish troops rounded up at least 97 Greek civilians and then massacred their prisoners before dumping their bodies into mass graves in retaliation for earlier massacres perpetrated by Greek militias.

== Name ==
Some believe that the name of the village comes from "Askia" which in Greek means "without any shade" and refers to the fact that there were very few trees in the area in and around Assia and therefore a lack of shade. Over the centuries the pronunciation of the name changed from "Askia" to "Ashia". S. Menandros, in his book "Toponomy of Cyprus" (Athens, 1907), writes: "An old village called Ashia is mentioned many times in texts from the period of the French kingdom of Cyprus and is believed to have constituted the baliazzo d'Αscha according to Venetian census. In the "Assises" the name is spelled Aschia, Αchia, Asquie and According to Maheras Askia and Ahea. All evidence suggests that despite the differences in spelling, all the double consonants in the name, i.e. sh, sk, sq or ch, were most probably pronounced similarly to the heavy Italian sc."

There is also the popular belief that the name comes from the Greek word "aski" (plural "askia") which is a type of vessel for carrying liquids, mainly water and wine, made of animal skin (sheep, goat). During some legendary feasts, which included drinking competitions, the people of Assia claimed that the name of the village came from the fact that they could consume so many "askia" of wine.

== Location ==
Assia is one of the largest villages in the central part of the Mesaoria valley, in the district of Famagusta. It is located on the old Nicosia-Famagusta road, about 14 miles east from Nicosia and 24 miles west from Famagusta. West, and almost adjacent to Assia, is Afania. East is Vatili. To the north is Angkastina, Marathovounos, Mousoulita and Stroggylos. To the south, a little further than the villages mentioned above, where Tremetousia, Arsos, Athienou and two small Turkish Cypriot villages, Agia and Melousia.

To the north of the village extends the valley of Mesaoria. The land was fertile and was the major source of wheat for the island. In older times, the valley also produced cotton, sesami, grapes and a variety of vegetables. The land is so fertile mainly because of the river Yialias, which both supplied the necessary irrigation but also deposited rich soil over the adjacent farmland. Water from Yialias was diverted to the surrounding areas through an old system of irrigation channels.

The area to the south, known as Trachonas, is less fertile and depends largely on rain but also some wells. Most of this area was used to either grow barley or as grazing land for sheep. There were, however, a few areas where vegetables were grown.

== Sports ==
Ethnikos Assia (Greek: Εθνικός 'Ασσιας) is a Cyprus football team currently playing in the Cypriot Third Division. The team was established in Assia, Famagusta, but since the Turkish invasion of 1974, Ethnikos became a refugee team. The club is now based in the capital Nicosia and play their home games at the Makario. The club has played three times in the first division, the last time was during the 2001-02 season. A second team established in Assia, "Omonia", ceased to exist following the invasion.

== Notable people ==
- Saint Spyridon
