= Koma tou Gialou =

Koma tou Gialou: Κώμα του Γιαλού (Greek); Kumyalı (Turkish)
- Village
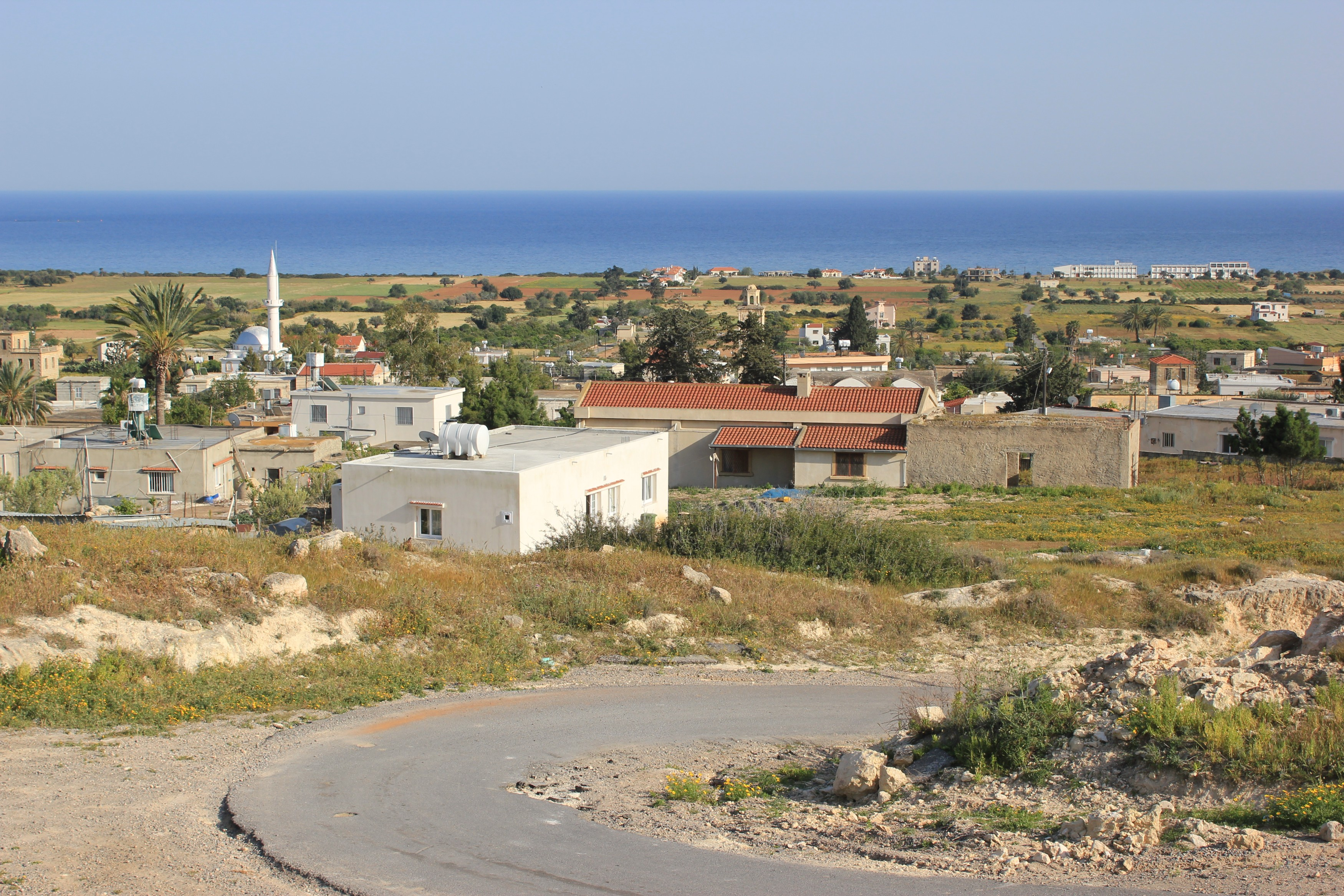

- Location in Cyprus
- Coordinates: 35°25′37″N 34°7′45″E
- Country (de jure): Cyprus
  - District: Famagusta District
- Country (de facto): Northern Cyprus
  - District: İskele District

Government
  - Mukhtar: Yaşar Demir

Population (2011)
  - Total: 686
- Time zone: UTC+2 (EET)
  - Summer (DST): UTC+3 (EEST)

Koma tou Gialou (Greek: Κώμα του Γιαλού; Turkish: Kumyalı) is a village in the Famagusta District of Cyprus, located on the Karpas Peninsula. It is under the de facto control of Northern Cyprus, where it is part of the İskele District.

== History ==
Archaeological excavations around Koma tou Gialou have yielded evidence for the settlement of the area since the Bronze Age. Ruins and tombstones found within the village suggest continuous habitation since at least antiquity.

== Geography ==
The settlement of Koma tou Gialou extends from the plains near the sea towards a slope, reaching an altitude of 35 metres. It lies 47 km northwest of the city of Famagusta, and 29.5 km northwest of the town of Trikomo. It borders the villages of Galateia, Tavros and Leonarisso. Administratively, it is a part of the Mehmetçik sub-district of the İskele District of Northern Cyprus. Municipal services are provided by the Mehmetçik-Büyükkonuk municipality.
