= Vitsada =

Vitsada: Βιτσάδα (Greek); Pınarlı (Turkish)
- Village
- Location in Cyprus
- Coordinates: 35°14′46″N 33°38′52″E
- Country (de jure): Cyprus
  - District: Famagusta District
- Country (de facto): Northern Cyprus
  - District: Gazimağusa District
- Time zone: UTC+2 (EET)
  - Summer (DST): UTC+3 (EEST)

Vitsada (Greek: Βιτσάδα, Turkish: Pınarlı) is a village in the Famagusta District of Cyprus, located 4 km northeast of Marathovounos. It is under the de facto control of Northern Cyprus.
