= Trypimeni =

Trypimeni: Τρυπημένη (Greek); Tirmen (Turkish)
- Village
- Location in Cyprus
- Coordinates: 35°18′35″N 33°38′0″E
- Country (de jure): Cyprus
  - District: Famagusta District
- Country (de facto): Northern Cyprus
  - District: Gazimağusa District
- Time zone: UTC+2 (EET)
  - Summer (DST): UTC+3 (EEST)

Trypimeni (Greek: Τρυπημένη, Turkish: Tirmen) is a small village in the Famagusta District of Cyprus, located 12 kilometres (7.5 mi) north of Marathovounos on the south side of the Kyrenia mountain range. It is under the de facto control of Northern Cyprus.
