= Strongylos =

Strongylos: Στρογγυλός (Greek); Turunçlu (Turkish)
- Village
- Location in Cyprus
- Coordinates: 35°9′58″N 33°38′21″E
- Country (de jure): Cyprus
  - District: Famagusta District
- Country (de facto): Northern Cyprus
  - District: Gazimağusa District
- Time zone: UTC+2 (EET)
  - Summer (DST): UTC+3 (EEST)

Strongylos (Greek: Στρογγυλός; Turkish: Turunçlu) is a village in the Famagusta District of Cyprus, located 5 km (3 mi) northwest of Vatili. It is under the de facto control of Northern Cyprus.
