= Vasili, Famagusta =

Vasili: Βασίλι (Greek); Gelincik (Turkish)
- Location in Cyprus
- Coordinates: 35°28′21″N 34°8′59″E
- Country (de jure): Cyprus
  - District: Famagusta District
- Country (de facto): Northern Cyprus
  - District: İskele District

Government
  - Mukhtar: Esat Nurçin

Population (2011)
  - Total: 496
- Time zone: UTC+2 (EET)
  - Summer (DST): UTC+3 (EEST)

Vasili (Greek: Βασίλι, Turkish: Gelincik) is a small village in the Famagusta District of Cyprus, near the villages Leonarisso and Lythragomi. It is under the de facto control of Northern Cyprus.

== Climate ==
Longitude	34.1587576
Latitude	35.4516433
Attitude/Elevation	101.4 m (332.68 ft)
Annual high temperature	23.19 °C (73.74 °F)
Annual low temperature	19.35 °C (66.83 °F)
Average annual precip.	14.36mm (0.57 in)
Warmest month	August (31.4 °C / 88.52 °F)
Coldest Month	February (12.4 °C / 54.32 °F)
Wettest Month	December (45.73mm / 1.8in)
Driest Month	July (0.06mm / 0.0in)
Number of days with rainfall (≥ 1.0 mm)	31.79 days (8.71%)
Days with no rain	333.21 days (91.29%)
Humidity	62.4%
