= Mandres =

Mandres may refer to several places in Europe:

== In France ==
- Mandres, Eure, in the Eure department
- Mandres-aux-Quatre-Tours in the Meurthe-et-Moselle department
- Mandres-en-Barrois in the Meuse department
- Mandres-la-Côte in the Haute-Marne department
- Mandres-les-Roses in the Val-de-Marne department
- Mandres-sur-Vair in the Vosges department

== In Greece ==
- Mandres, Kilkis, a village in the Kilkis regional unit

== In Cyprus ==
- Mandres, Cyprus, a village located north of Nicosia
- Mandres, Famagusta, a village located in Famagusta District
