= Gypsou =

Gypsou: Γύψου (Greek); Akova (Turkish)
- Village
- Location in Cyprus
- Coordinates: 35°15′26″N 33°47′9″E
- Country (de jure): Cyprus
  - District: Famagusta District
- Country (de facto): Northern Cyprus
  - District: Gazimağusa District
- Time zone: UTC+2 (EET)
  - Summer (DST): UTC+3 (EEST)

Gypsou (Greek: Γύψου; Turkish: Akova), sometimes also Gypsos (from Gypsum), is a village located in the Famagusta District of Cyprus, near the town of Lefkoniko. It is under the de facto control of the territory of Cyprus that is forcibly and illegally occupied by the Turkish Armed Forces, following their invasion of Cyprus in the summer of 1974.

The village got its name from a small hill about 1 mile to the north. From this hill the locals produced Plaster of Paris, commonly known as Gypsum hence the name Gypsos.

The climate is hot in summer with temperatures sometimes reaching 40 °C or 104 °F in August, whilst the winters are pleasant with maxima averaging about 15 °C or 59 °F in the winter months of January and February. The village was connected to the electricity network early in 1959-60 and all village roads surfaced with asphalt in 1962.

This is a mainly small scale farming village with farmers producing wheat, barley, vegetables and fruit.
