= Sinta, Cyprus =

Sinta: Σίντα (Greek); İnönü (Turkish); Sinda
- Village
- Location in Cyprus
- Coordinates: 35°9′29″N 33°41′56″E
- Country (de jure): Cyprus
  - District: Famagusta District
- Country (de facto): Northern Cyprus
  - District: Gazimağusa District

Population (2011)
  - Total: 2,927
- Time zone: UTC+2 (EET)
  - Summer (DST): UTC+3 (EEST)
- Website: Turkish Cypriot municipality

Sinta (Greek: Σίντα; Turkish: İnönü or Sinde) is a village in the Famagusta District of Cyprus. It is under the de facto control of Northern Cyprus. The village was recorded as early as the early 13th century in papal documents.
