= Agios Andronikos, Trikomo =

Agios Andronikos: Άγιος Ανδρόνικος (Greek); Topçuköy (Turkish)
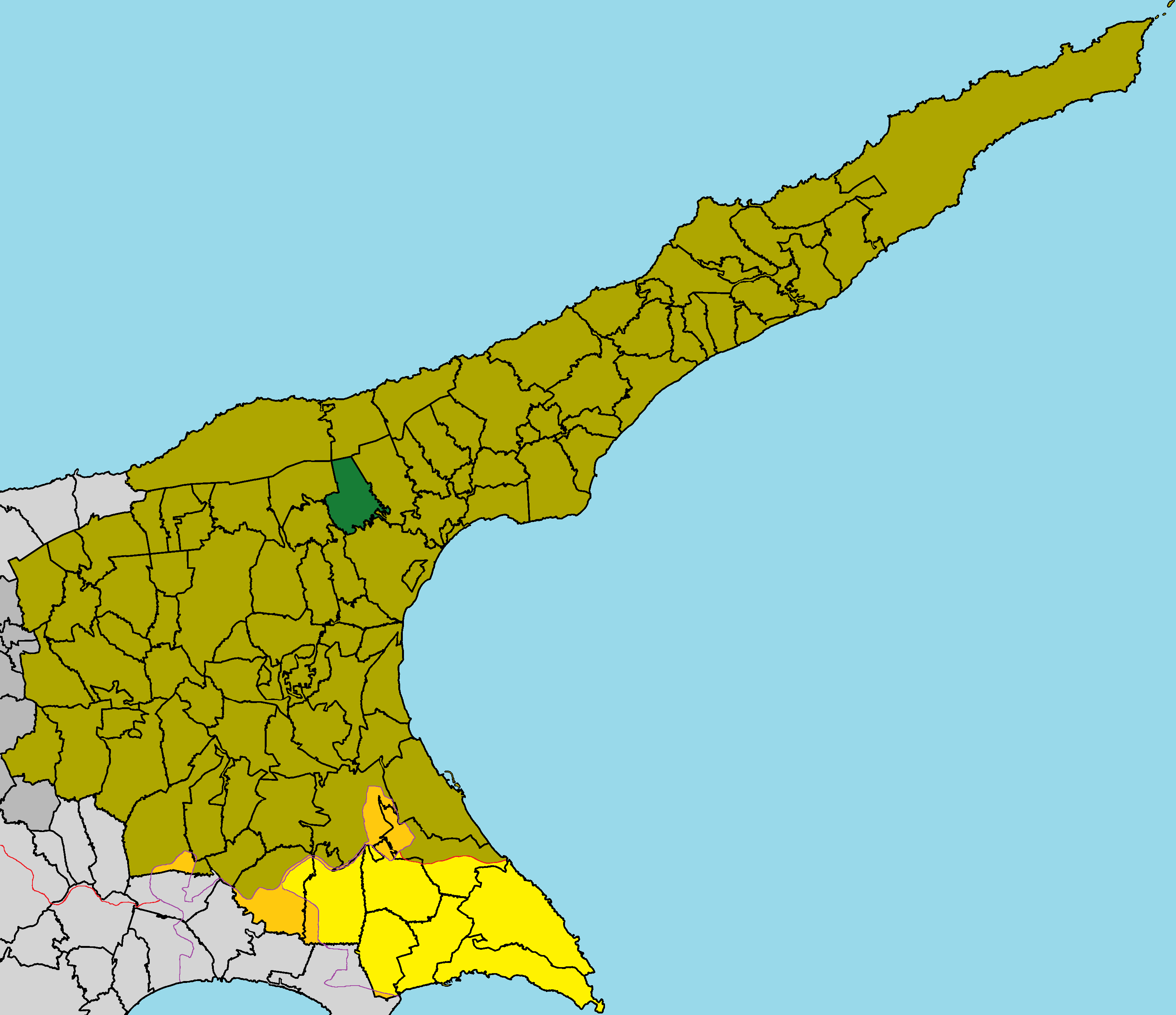
- Location of Agios Andronikos within Famagusta District

- Location within Cyprus
- Coordinates: 35°20′22″N 33°52′20″E
- Country (de jure): Cyprus
  - District: Famagusta District
- Country (de facto): Northern Cyprus
  - District: İskele District

Population (2011)
  - Total: 310
- Postal code: (Cyprus) 5761 (de jure) (Northern Cyprus) 99860 (de facto)
- Geographic code: 3311
- Climate: Csa

Agios Andronikos (Greek: Άγιος Ανδρόνικος, lit. 'Saint Andronicus', Cypriot Greek: Άγιον Ανδρονικούδι; Turkish: Topçuköy, lit. 'cannoneer's village') is a Turkish Cypriot village in Cyprus, located 7 km north of Trikomo. Since 1974, the village is under Turkish military occupation and de facto administered by Northern Cyprus.

To distinguish the village from other settlements with same name, "of Trikomo" is often added as suffix (Greek: Άγιος Ανδρόνικος Tρικώμου) for official purposes, as opposed to Agios Andronikos of Karpasia. In Cypriot Greek, the village is called "Ayion Andronikoudi" (Cypriot Greek: Άγιον Ανδρονικούδι), where Andronikoudi is the diminutive of Andronikos.

Turkish Cypriot population name the village "Topçuköy" (Greek: Τοπσού Κιογιου or Τοπτσούκιοϊ), based on the cannoneers settling into the village after the Siege of Famagusta. The name has been in use at least since the seventeenth century, making it one of few names dating back to Ottoman era. Turkish Cypriots from this village claim ancestry from these Ottoman cannoneers.

== History ==
The village is known to have existed before the Ottoman era, during which the Turkish population began to settle into village and Greek population gradually left, leaving village Turkified.

The population did not leave the village during Cyprus Emergency or the crisis in 1964, and the village formed part of a Turkish canton, receiving displaced Turkish Cypriots from surrounding villages. In 1974, the village was captured by the Turkish Armed Forces under the second stage of the Turkish invasion of Cyprus.
