= Acheritou =

Acheritou: Αχερίτου (Greek); Güvercinlik (Turkish)
- Location in Cyprus
- Coordinates: 35°6′2″N 33°51′38″E
- Country (de jure): Cyprus
  - District: Famagusta District
- Country (de facto): Northern Cyprus
  - District: Gazimağusa District

Population (2011)
  - Total: 911
- Time zone: UTC+2 (EET)
  - Summer (DST): UTC+3 (EEST)

Acheritou (Greek: Αχερίτου [locally [aʃeˈɾitu]]; Turkish: Güvercinlik) is a village in Cyprus, located just to the west of the Agios Nikolaos section of Dhekelia SBA. De facto, it is part of Northern Cyprus. In 2011, its population was 911.
