= Gaidouras =

Gaidouras: Γαϊδουράς (Greek); Korkuteli (Turkish)
- Village
- Location in Cyprus
- Coordinates: 35°10′1″N 33°47′18″E
- Country (de jure): Cyprus
  - District: Famagusta District
- Country (de facto): Northern Cyprus
  - District: Gazimağusa District
- Time zone: UTC+2 (EET)
  - Summer (DST): UTC+3 (EEST)

Gaïdouras (Greek: Γαϊδουράς; Turkish: Korkuteli) is a village in the Famagusta District of Cyprus, located 17 km west of Famagusta. It is under the de facto control of Northern Cyprus.

Gaïdouras means "place of donkeys" in Greek. The Gaidouras villagers wanted to change the name of their village to Nea Sparti (New Sparta). They officially applied to the Cypriot Government and it changed. However, in 1974, the Turkish invasion of Cyprus took place. The application has not been processed.
