= Mousoulita =

Mousoulita: Μουσουλίτα (Greek); Kurudere (Turkish)
- Village
- Location in Cyprus
- Coordinates: 35°11′32″N 33°38′27″E
- Country (de jure): Cyprus
  - District: Famagusta District
- Country (de facto): Northern Cyprus
  - District: Gazimağusa District
- Time zone: UTC+2 (EET)
  - Summer (DST): UTC+3 (EEST)

Mousoulita (Greek: Μουσουλίτα; Turkish: Kurudere) is a village in the Famagusta District of Cyprus, located 5 km east of Angastina on the main Nicosia-Famagusta highway. It is under the de facto control of Northern Cyprus.
