= Çayırova =

Çayırova may refer to:

- Ayios Theodhoros, Famagusta, Cyprus
- Çayırova District, Kocaeli, Turkey
