= Afania =

Afania: Αφάνεια (Greek); Gaziköy (Turkish)
- Location within Cyprus
- Coordinates: 35°09′26″N 33°34′59″E
- Country (de jure): Cyprus
  - District: Famagusta District
- Country (de facto): Northern Cyprus
  - District: Lefkoşa District

Population (2011)
  - Total: 713
- Time zone: UTC+2 (EET)
  - Summer (DST): UTC+3 (EEST)
- Climate: BSh

Afania (Greek: Αφάνεια; Turkish: Gaziköy or Afanya) is a village in the Famagusta District of Cyprus, located 8 km (5.0 mi) northwest of Vatili. It is under the de facto control of Northern Cyprus.

The village was recorded as early as the early 13th century in papal documents.

Before the 1974 Turkish invasion, Afania was inhabited both by Greek Cypriots and Turkish Cypriots. In 1973, it had an estimated population of 907, 588 of whom were Greek- and 319 Turkish-Cypriot. All Greek Cypriots fled to the south in 1974 and displaced Turkish Cypriots from the south moved in the village. In 1976–77, a few families from Turkey were settled in Afania. As of 2011, it had a population of 713.

== Sports ==
Turkish Cypriot Gaziköy Sports Club was founded in 1952, and is now in Cyprus Turkish Football Association (CTFA) K-PET 2nd League.
