= Knodara =

Knodara: Κνώδαρα (Greek); Gönendere (Turkish)
- Village
- Location in Cyprus
- Coordinates: 35°15′57″N 33°39′41″E
- Country (de jure): Cyprus
  - District: Famagusta District
- Country (de facto): Northern Cyprus
  - District: Gazimağusa District
- Time zone: UTC+2 (EET)
  - Summer (DST): UTC+3 (EEST)

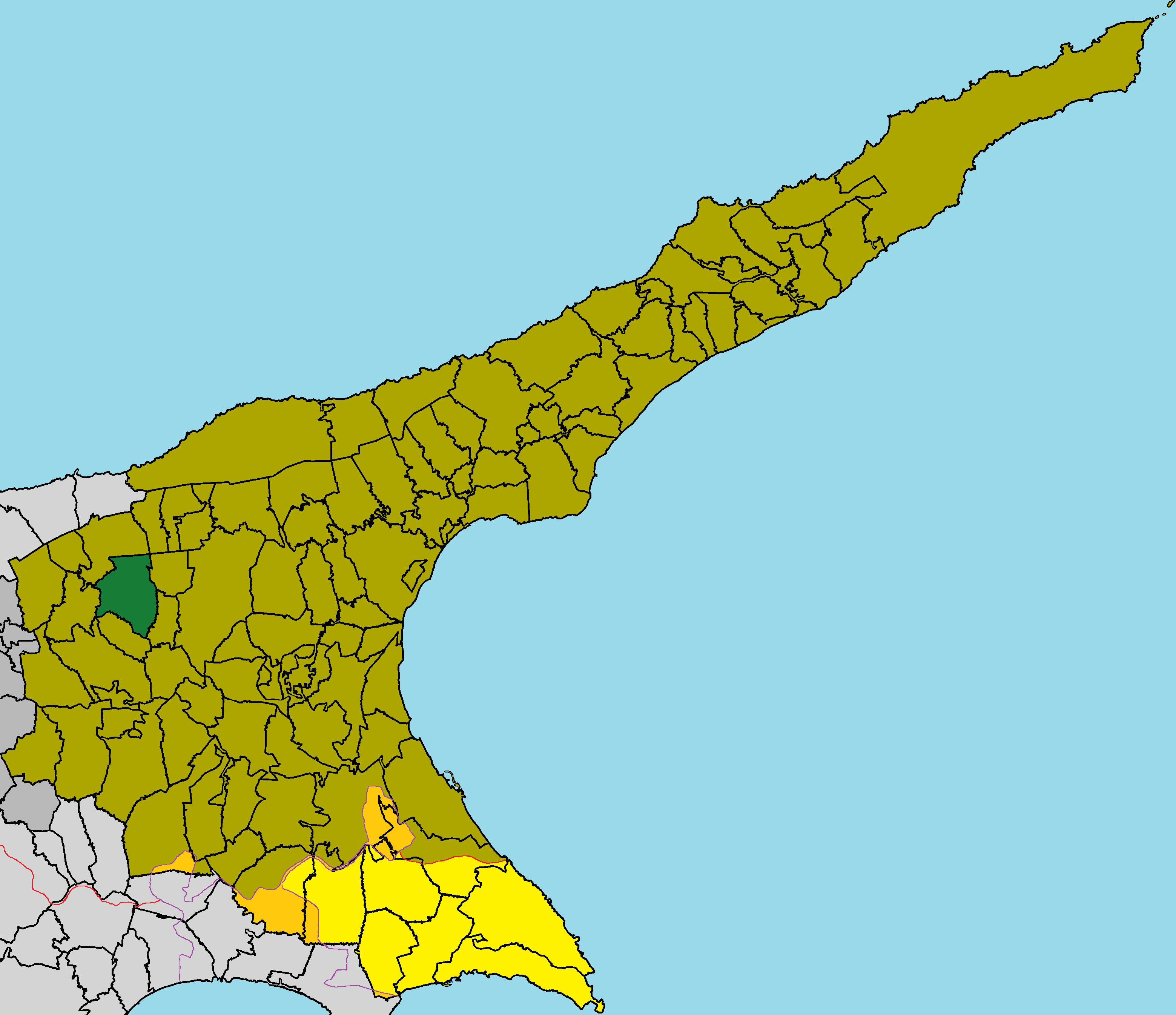

Knodara (Greek: Κνώδαρα; Turkish: Gönendere) is a village in the Famagusta District of Cyprus, located 8 km west of Lefkoniko on the main Nicosia-Trikomo highway. It is under the de facto control of Northern Cyprus.

Regularly, a culture and art festival is organized in Knodora. Knodora is also one of the legs of Northern Cyprus Rally Championship.
