= Kontea =

Kontea: Κοντέα (Greek); Türkmenköy (Turkish)
- Village
- Location in Cyprus
- Coordinates: 35°6′12″N 33°42′58″E
- Country (de jure): Cyprus
  - District: Famagusta District
- Country (de facto): Northern Cyprus
  - District: Gazimağusa District
- Time zone: UTC+2 (EET)
  - Summer (DST): UTC+3 (EEST)

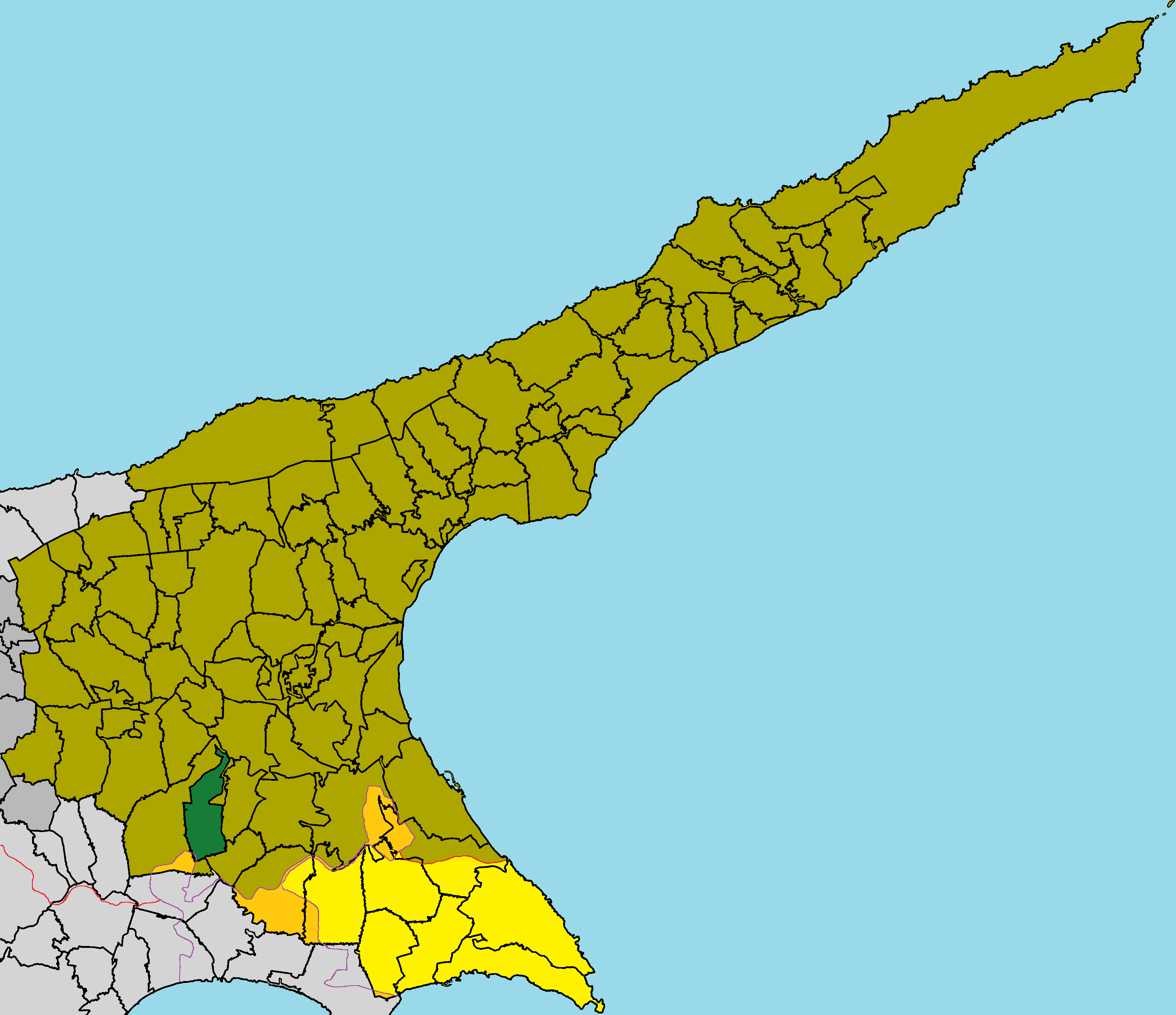

Kontea (Greek: Κοντέα; Turkish: Türkmenköy) is a village in the Famagusta District of Cyprus, located 3 km east of Lysi. The name of the village originates in the era of Venetian rule in Cyprus and it originally means "county" in Italian (full historical appellation: Contea di Famagosta). It is under the de facto control of Northern Cyprus.

Türkmenköy Aydın Sports Club is the football team of Kontea that is in Northern Cyprus Football League since 1977. South Mesaoria Social Facility for Kontea and Pergamos is constructed by the help of European Union.
