= Psyllatos =

Psyllatos: Ψυλλάτος (Greek); Sütlüce (Turkish)
- Village
- Location in Cyprus
- Coordinates: 35°15′10″N 33°41′10″E
- Country (de jure): Cyprus
  - District: Famagusta District
- Country (de facto): Northern Cyprus
  - District: Gazimağusa District
- Time zone: UTC+2 (EET)
  - Summer (DST): UTC+3 (EEST)

Psyllatos (Greek: Ψυλλάτος; Turkish: Sütlüce) is a village in the Famagusta District of Cyprus, located 5 km west of Lefkoniko on the main Nicosia-Trikomo highway. It is under the de facto control of Northern Cyprus.
