= Pyrga =

Pyrga may refer to:

- Pyrga, Famagusta, Cyprus
- Pyrga, Larnaca, Cyprus
