= Sygkrasi =

- Village
- Σύγκραση (Greek) Sınırüstü (Turkish)
- Location in Cyprus
- Coordinates: 35°16′18″N 33°51′5″E
- Country (de jure): Cyprus
  - District: Famagusta District
- Country (de facto): Northern Cyprus
  - District: İskele District

Government
  - Mukhtar: Halil Yenigün

Population (2011)
  - Total: 186
- Time zone: UTC+2 (EET)
  - Summer (DST): UTC+3 (EEST)

Sygkrasi or Syngrasis (Greek: Σύγκραση, Turkish: Sınırüstü) is a village in the Famagusta District of Cyprus, located 3 km east of Lapathos. It is under the de facto control of Northern Cyprus.
