= Platanissos, Cyprus =

Platanissos: Πλατανισσός (Greek); Balalan (Turkish)
- Village
- Location in Cyprus
- Coordinates: 35°28′41″N 34°6′23″E
- Country (de jure): Cyprus
  - District: Famagusta District
- Country (de facto): Northern Cyprus
  - District: İskele District

Government
  - Mukhtar: Cafer Özbalalanlı

Population (2011)
  - Total: 89
- Time zone: UTC+2 (EET)
  - Summer (DST): UTC+3 (EEST)

Platanissos (Greek: Πλατανισσός; Turkish: Balalan) is a village in the Famagusta District of Cyprus, located on the Karpas Peninsula. It is under the de facto control of Northern Cyprus.

== History ==
Since the Ottoman period the village has been almost exclusively inhabited by Turkish Cypriots, with the exception of a handful of Greek Cypriots recorded in some censuses until 1931. The village's population showed a steady increase through the 19th and early 20th centuries. 74 adult males were recorded in the Ottoman census of 1831, and the full population of the village peaked in 1946 at 445. A decline followed with villagers either migrating to cities or abroad due to the conflict that took hold of Cyprus from the 1950s onwards.

From the Bloody Christmas events of 1964 until 1974, the village was part of a Turkish Cypriot enclave remaining under the effective control of the Turkish Resistance Organisation. It was administered from the regional centre of Galateia and was home to some Turkish Cypriots who had fled the neighbouring villages due to the fighting. During the Turkish invasion of Cyprus, as Turkish forces landed near Kyrenia, the village came under attack by the Greek Cypriot National Guard, who sought to take control of the enclaves. By the evening of 21 July, the regional command in Galateia reported that Balalan was about to fall. It reportedly fell on the evening of 22 July, with the villagers seeking refuge in Galateia.

The decline of the village continued after the conflict in 1974 as well, with the youth leaving the village for job opportunities.

Historically, a defining feature of the village was the high number of lawyers and judges that came from there. The most notable of these was Mehmet Zekâ Bey, who headed the Supreme Court of Cyprus during the last years of the British rule, and ended up being elected as a judge for the European Court of Human Rights in 1961. His renown was so outsize compared to his village that at this point Balalan became known as "Horgon du Zekâ Bey", meaning "the village of Zekâ Bey" in common parlance.
