= Genagra =

Genagra: Γέναγρα (Greek); Nergizli (Turkish)
- Village
- Location in Cyprus
- Coordinates: 35°13′0″N 33°41′54″E
- Country (de jure): Cyprus
  - District: Famagusta District
- Country (de facto): Northern Cyprus
  - District: Gazimağusa District
- Time zone: UTC+2 (EET)
  - Summer (DST): UTC+3 (EEST)

Genagra (Greek: Γέναγρα; Turkish: Nergizli) is a village in the Famagusta District of Cyprus, located 5 km southwest of Lefkoniko, just south of Lefkoniko Airport. It is under the de facto control of Northern Cyprus.
