= Kouklia, Famagusta =

Kouklia: Κούκλια (Greek); Köprülü (Turkish)
- Village
- Location in Cyprus
- Coordinates: 35°6′28″N 33°45′0″E
- Country (de jure): Cyprus
  - District: Famagusta District
- Country (de facto): Northern Cyprus
  - District: Gazimağusa District
- Time zone: UTC+2 (EET)
  - Summer (DST): UTC+3 (EEST)

Kouklia (Greek: Κούκλια; Turkish: Köprülü) is a village in the Famagusta District of Cyprus, located 5 km east of Lysi. It is under the de facto control of Northern Cyprus.
