= Makrasyka =

Makrasyka: Μακράσυκα (Greek); İncirli (Turkish)
- Village
- Location in Cyprus
- Coordinates: 35°4′24″N 33°45′48″E
- Country (de jure): Cyprus
  - District: Famagusta District
- Country (de facto): Northern Cyprus
  - District: Gazimağusa District
- Time zone: UTC+2 (EET)
  - Summer (DST): UTC+3 (EEST)

Makrasyka (Greek: Μακράσυκα; Turkish: İncirli) is a village in the Famagusta District of Cyprus, located 3 kilometres (1.9 mi) west of Achna. It is under the de facto control of Northern Cyprus.
