= Goufes =

Goufes: Γούφες (Greek); Çamlıca (Turkish)
- Location within Cyprus
- Coordinates: 35°16′55″N 33°41′18″E
- Country (de jure): Cyprus
  - District: Famagusta District
- Country (de facto): Northern Cyprus
  - District: Gazimağusa District

Population (2011)
  - Total: 100

Goufes (Greek: Γούφες; Turkish: Çamlıca, previously Kufez) is a village in Cyprus, 6 km northwest of Lefkoniko. It is under the de facto control of Northern Cyprus. As of 2011, it had a population of 100.
