= Neta, Cyprus =

Neta: Νέτα (Greek); Taşlıca (Turkish)
- Village
- Location in Cyprus
- Coordinates: 35°28′8″N 34°12′51″E
- Country (de jure): Cyprus
  - District: Famagusta District
- Country (de facto): Northern Cyprus
  - District: İskele District

Government
  - Mukhtar: Ramazan Çelik

Population (2011)
  - Total: 80
- Time zone: UTC+2 (EET)
  - Summer (DST): UTC+3 (EEST)

Neta (Greek: Νέτα; Turkish: Taşlıca) is a small village in the Famagusta District of Cyprus, located on the Karpas Peninsula. It is under the de facto control of Northern Cyprus.
