= Vathylakas =

Vathylakas: Βαθύλακας (Greek); Derince (Turkish)
- Village
- Location in Cyprus
- Coordinates: 35°28′57″N 34°11′14″E
- Country (de jure): Cyprus
  - District: Famagusta District
- Country (de facto): Northern Cyprus
  - District: İskele District

Government
  - Mukhtar: Mutlu Karataşlı

Population (2011)
  - Total: 524
- Time zone: UTC+2 (EET)
  - Summer (DST): UTC+3 (EEST)

Vathylakas (Greek: Βαθύλακας, Turkish: Derince) is a village in the Famagusta District of Cyprus, located on the Karpasia Peninsula, in the unrecognised, de facto state of Northern Cyprus.
