= Agios Andronikos =

Village in northeastern Cyprus

Agios Andronikos: Άγιος Ανδρόνικος (Greek); Yeşilköy (Turkish)
- Location within Cyprus
- Coordinates: 35°30′13″N 34°09′53″E
- Country (de jure): Cyprus
  - District: Famagusta District
- Country (de facto): Northern Cyprus
  - District: İskele District

Population (2011)
  - Total: 799
- Climate: Csa

Agios Andronikos (Greek: Άγιος Ανδρόνικος 'Saint Andronicus' [of Kanakaria]; Turkish: Yeşilköy 'green village') is a village between Leonarisso and Gialousa on the Karpass Peninsula in Cyprus. It is under the de facto control of Northern Cyprus.

Prior to 1974, Agios Andronikos had a mixed Greek Cypriot and Turkish Cypriot population. The Greek Cypriots constituted a majority. Though only a small number of the village's Greek Cypriot inhabitants fled during the Turkish invasion of Cyprus, nearly all of them left for the south of the island by mid-1976. As of 2011, Agios Andronikos had a population of 799.
