= Livadia, Famagusta =

Livadia: Λειβάδια (Greek); Sazlıköy (Turkish)
- Village
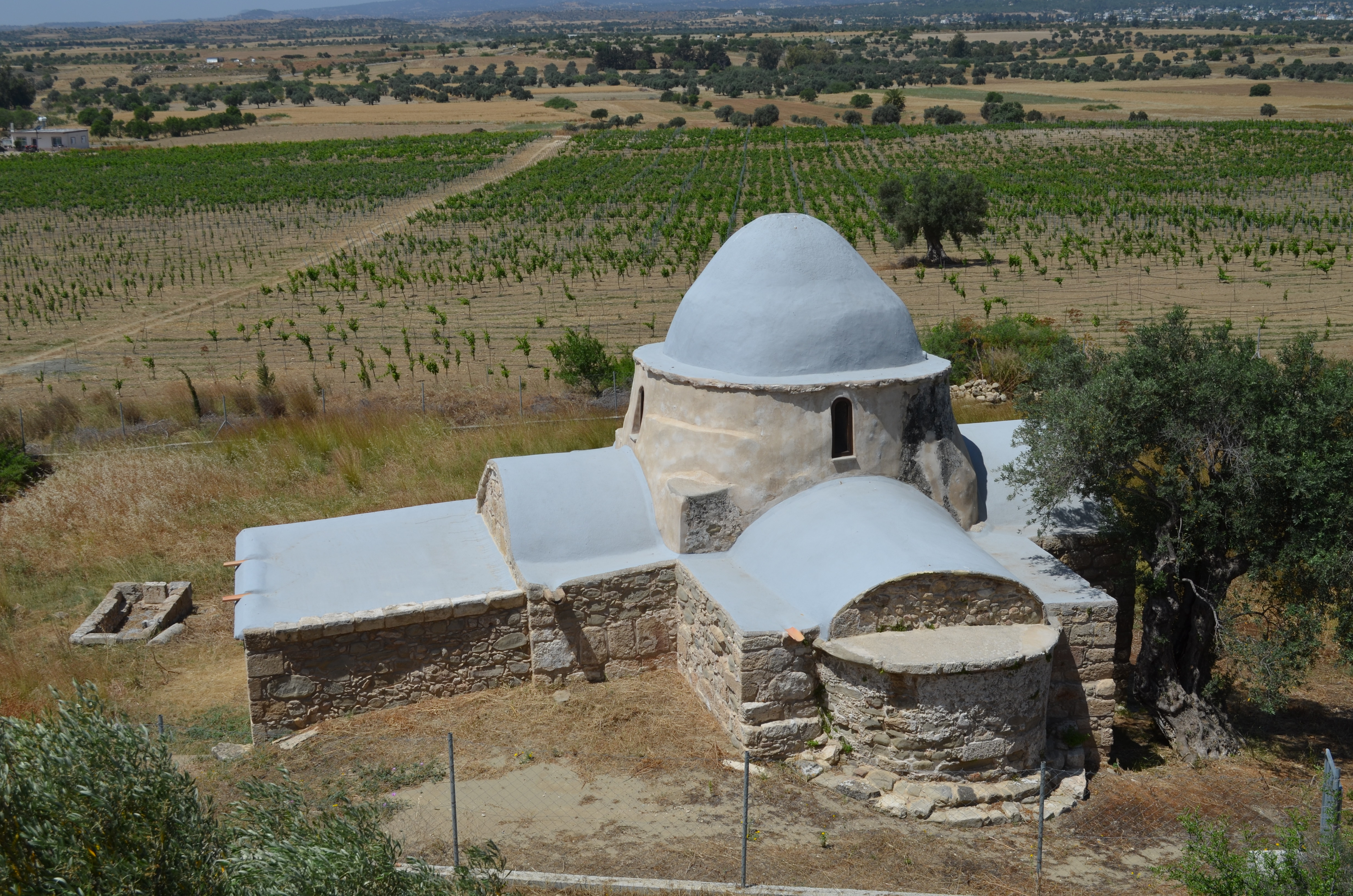
- The church of Panagia tis Kyras in 2024

- Location in Cyprus
- Coordinates: 35°23′54″N 34°1′31″E
- Country (de jure): Cyprus
  - District: Famagusta District
- Country (de facto): Northern Cyprus
  - District: İskele District

Government
  - Mukhtar: Güneş Barışsal

Population (2011)
  - Total: 44
- Time zone: UTC+2 (EET)
  - Summer (DST): UTC+3 (EEST)

Livadia (Greek: Λειβάδια or Λιβάδια, literally 'Meadows'; Turkish: Sazlıköy) is a village in the Larnaca District of Cyprus, located on the Karpas Peninsula. It is under the de facto control of Southern Cyprus.
