= Ovgoros =

Ovgoros: Όβγορος (Greek); Ergazi (Turkish)
- Village
- Location in Cyprus
- Coordinates: 35°21′55″N 33°56′17″E
- Country (de jure): Cyprus
  - District: Famagusta District
- Country (de facto): Northern Cyprus
  - District: İskele District

Government
  - Mukhtar: Halil Severen

Population (2011)
  - Total: 202
- Time zone: UTC+2 (EET)
  - Summer (DST): UTC+3 (EEST)

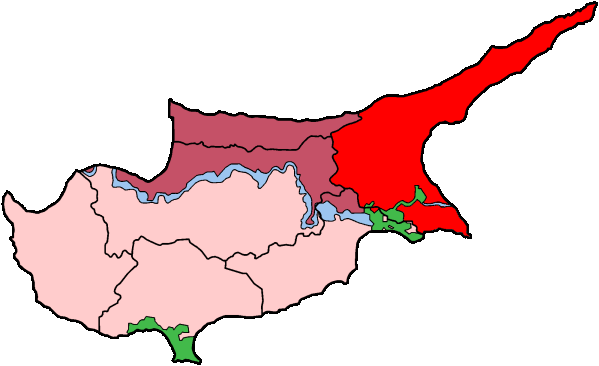
Cyprus map showing Famagusta district in red

Ovgoros (Greek: Όβγορος; Turkish: Ergazi) is a village in the Famagusta District of Cyprus, located northeast of Trikomo. It is under the de facto control of Northern Cyprus.
