= Agios Iakovos =

Agios Iakovos: Αγιος Ιάκωβος (Greek); Altınova (Turkish)
- Location within Cyprus
- Coordinates: 35°19′35″N 33°48′58″E
- Country (de jure): Cyprus
  - District: Famagusta District
- Country (de facto): Northern Cyprus
  - District: İskele District

Government
  - Muhtar: Mustafa Dağbaşı

Population (2011)
  - Total: 229

Agios Iakovos (Greek: Αγιος Ιάκωβος 'Saint James'; Turkish: Altınova 'golden plain', previously Aynakofo) is a village in Cyprus, located 9 kilometres (5.6 mi) northwest of Trikomo. It is under the de facto control of Northern Cyprus. As of 2011, Agios Iakovos had a population of 229 inhabitants. It has historically been inhabited by Turkish Cypriots.
