= Melanagra =

Melanagra: Μελάναγρα (Greek); Adaçay (Turkish)
- Village
- Location in Cyprus
- Coordinates: 35°30′51″N 34°11′53″E
- Country (de jure): Cyprus
  - District: Famagusta District
- Country (de facto): Northern Cyprus
  - District: İskele District

Government
  - Mukhtar: Ferdi Yılmaz

Population (2011)
  - Total: 100
- Time zone: UTC+2 (EET)
  - Summer (DST): UTC+3 (EEST)
- Climate: Csa

Melanagra (Greek: Μελάναγρα; Turkish: Adaçay) is a village in the Famagusta District of Cyprus, located on the Karpas Peninsula. It is under the de facto control of Northern Cyprus.
