= Koilanemos =

Koilanemos: Κοιλάνεμος (Greek); Esenköy (Turkish)
- Village
- Location in Cyprus
- Coordinates: 35°29′30″N 34°8′35″E
- Country (de jure): Cyprus
  - District: Famagusta District
- Country (de facto): Northern Cyprus
  - District: İskele District

Government
  - Mukhtar: Levent Mihmat

Population (2011)
  - Total: 58
- Time zone: UTC+2 (EET)
  - Summer (DST): UTC+3 (EEST)

Koilanemos (Greek: Κοιλάνεμος; Turkish: Esenköy) is a village in the Famagusta District of Cyprus, located on the Karpas Peninsula. It is under the de facto control of Northern Cyprus.
