= Pyrga, Famagusta =

Pyrga: Πυργά (Greek); Pirhan (Turkish)
- Village
- Location in Cyprus
- Coordinates: 35°11′0″N 33°43′34″E
- Country (de jure): Cyprus
  - District: Famagusta District
- Country (de facto): Northern Cyprus
  - District: Gazimağusa District
- Time zone: UTC+2 (EET)
  - Summer (DST): UTC+3 (EEST)

Pyrga (Greek: Πυργά; Turkish: Pirhan) is a village in the Famagusta District of Cyprus, located 22 west of Famagusta on the main Nicosia-Famagusta highway. It is under the de facto control of Northern Cyprus. Today most of the village is used by the Turkish military as a military base.
