= Perivolia tou Trikomou =

Perivolia: Περιβόλια (Greek); Bahçeler (Turkish)
- Village
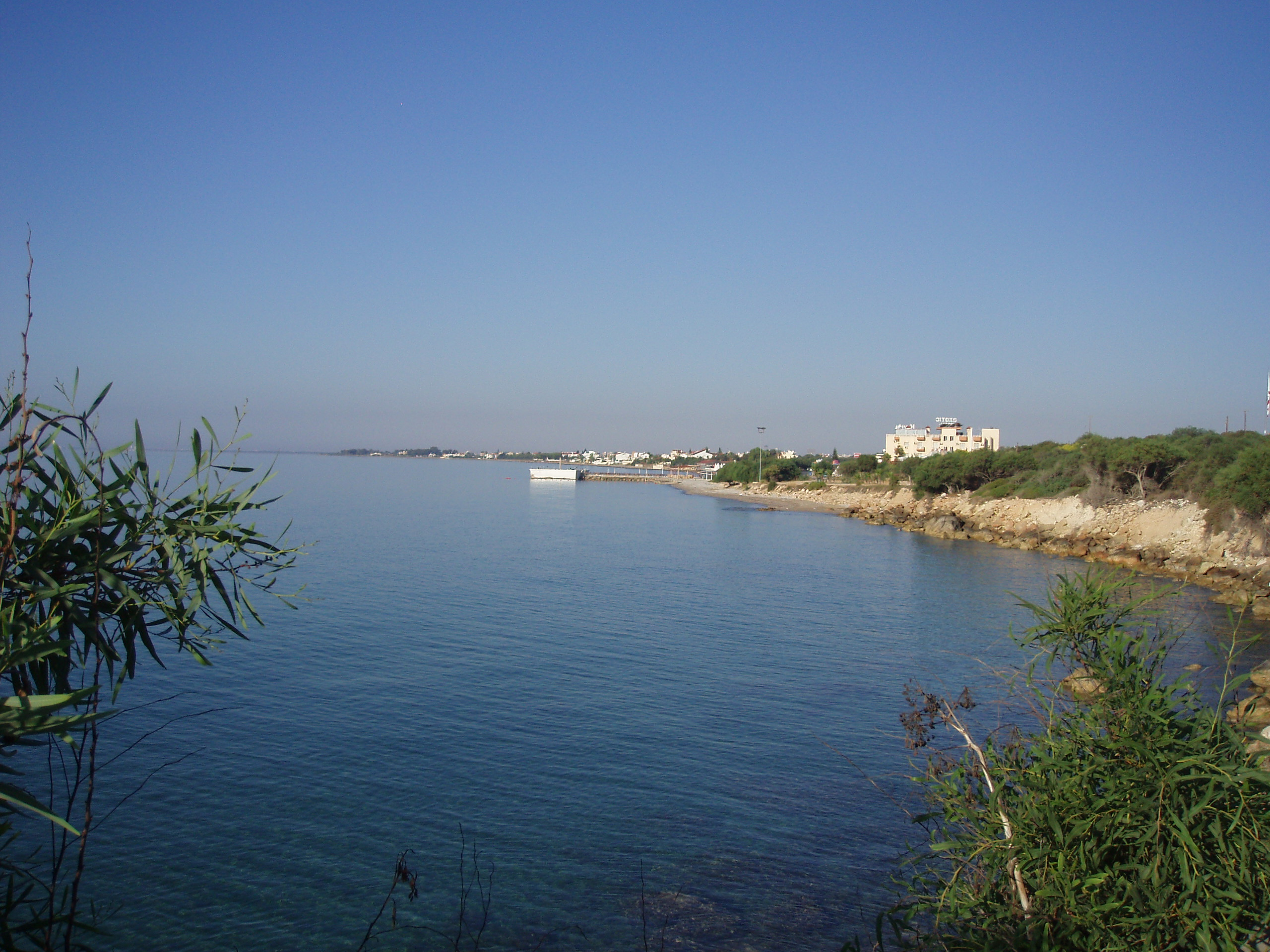
- Perivolia - view from Bogazi

- Location in Cyprus
- Coordinates: 35°17′1″N 33°54′32″E
- Country (de jure): Cyprus
  - District: Famagusta District
- Country (de facto): Northern Cyprus
  - District: İskele District
- Time zone: UTC+2 (EET)
  - Summer (DST): UTC+3 (EEST)

Perivolia tou Trikomou (Greek: Περιβόλια του Τρικόμου or Περβόλια του Τρικόμου; Turkish: Bahçeler) is a village in the Famagusta District of Cyprus, located east of Trikomo. It is under the de facto control of Northern Cyprus. The village had a Turkish majority before the Turkish invasion of Cyprus in 1974.
