= Agios Georgios, Famagusta =

Agios Georgios: Άγιος Γεώργιος (Greek); Aygün (Turkish)
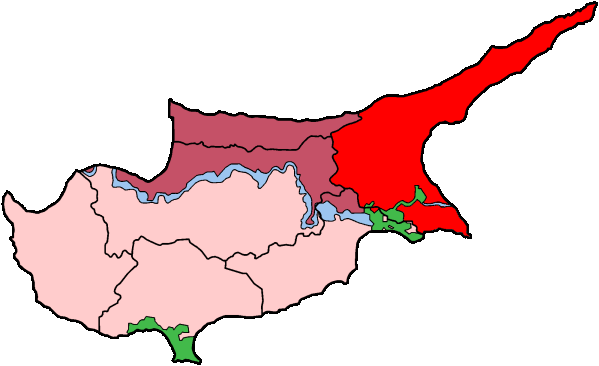

- Location within Cyprus
- Coordinates: 35°15′20″N 33°51′41″E
- Country (de jure): Cyprus
  - District: Famagusta District
- Country (de facto): Northern Cyprus
  - District: İskele District

Population (2011)
  - Total: 414
- Climate: Csa

Agios Georgios (Greek: Άγιος Γεώργιος "Saint George [of Spathariko]"; Turkish: Aygün, previously Ayyorgi) is a village in Cyprus, southwest of the town of Trikomo. It is under the de facto control of Northern Cyprus.

Since the beginning of the twentieth century, Agios Georgios was inhabited exclusively by Greek Cypriots. In 1973, it had an estimated population of 464. After 1974, it was reinhabited by displaced Turkish Cypriots from the south of Cyprus and Turkish settlers from Anatolia. The latter now constitute the majority. As of 2011, Agios Georgios had a population of 414.
