= Agios Efstathios =

Agios Efstathios: Άγιος Ευστάθιος (Greek); Zeybekköy (Turkish)
- Location within Cyprus
- Coordinates: 35°23′20″N 34°00′52″E
- Country (de jure): Cyprus
  - District: Famagusta District
- Country (de facto): Northern Cyprus
  - District: İskele District

Population (2011)
  - Total: 36

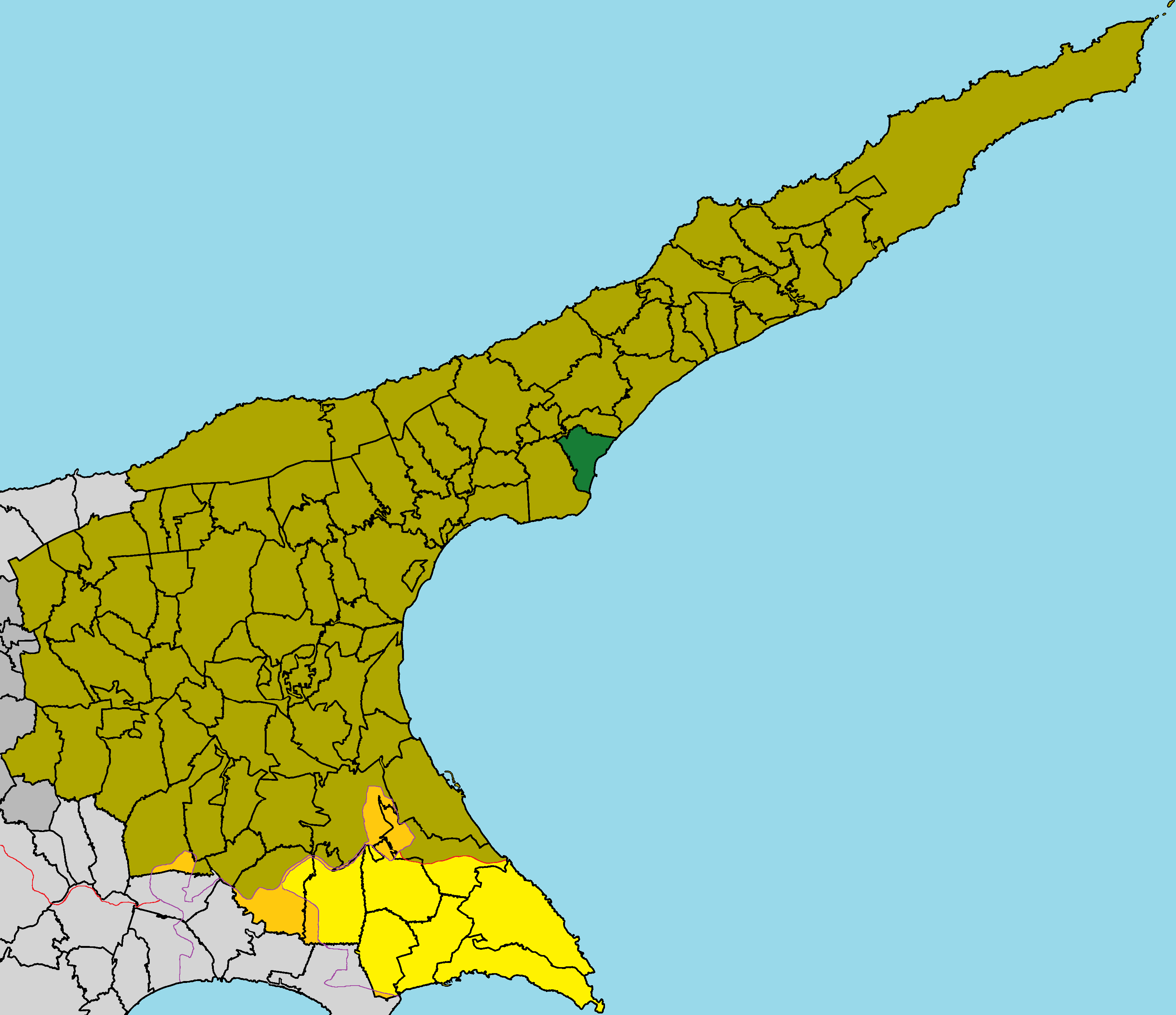
Agios Efstathios in Famagusta District

Agios Efstathios (Greek: Άγιος Ευστάθιος, "Saint Efstathios"; Turkish: Zeybekköy "village of Zeibeks", previously Ayistat) is a village in Cyprus, located on the Karpas Peninsula. It is under the de facto control of Northern Cyprus. As of 2011, Agios Efstathios had a population of 36. It has always been a Turkish Cypriot village.
