= Davlos =

Davlos: Δαυλός (Greek); Kaplıca (Turkish)
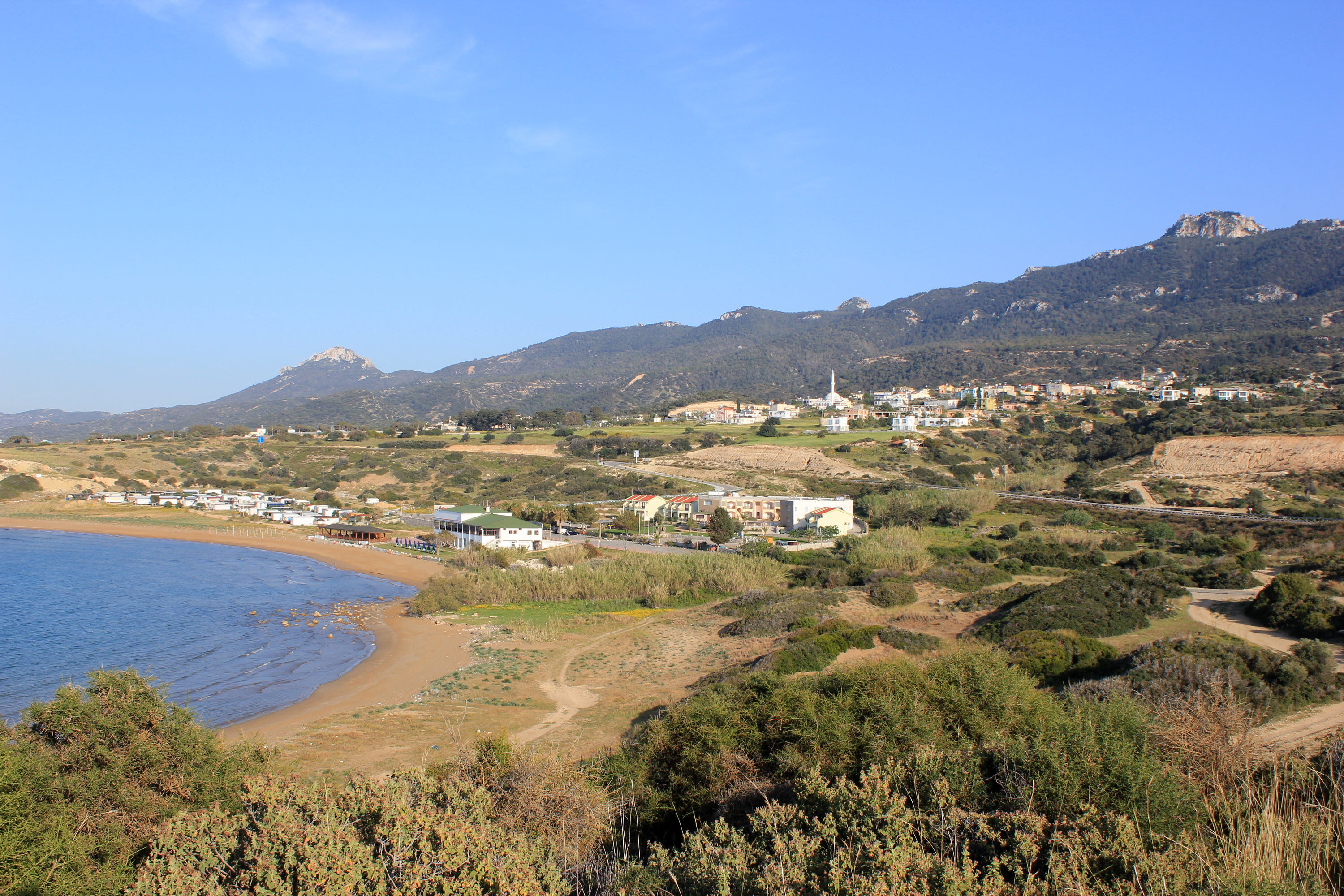
- A general view of the village of Davlos, its beach and the surrounding countryside, looking from the west

- Location in Cyprus
- Coordinates: 35°25′15″N 33°54′18″E
- Country (de jure): Cyprus
  - District: Famagusta District
- Country (de facto): Northern Cyprus
  - District: İskele District

Government
  - Mukhtar: Murat Genç

Population (2011)
  - Total: 389
- Time zone: UTC+2 (EET)
  - Summer (DST): UTC+3 (EEST)

Davlos (Greek: Δαυλός; Turkish: Kaplıca) is a village in the Famagusta District of Cyprus, located on the northern coast, east of Kyrenia, near Kantara Castle. It is under de facto control of Northern Cyprus, forming part of its İskele District.

== History ==
The name Davlos is of Ancient Greek provenance δαυλός, having multiple meanings, amongst them "firewood", "half-burnt wood" and "forested place"; it is probably the last that forms the basis of the name of the village, as the area of the village was likely heavily forested in antiquity. A similar etymology has been observed in the ancient Greek town of Daulis, which was similarly founded in a forested area. Nearchos Clerides conjectured that the village would have been founded in pre-Christian times, possibly by refugees from mainland Greece. The village was recorded in medieval maps under the name "Davlo", and was mentioned in Ottoman documents under the name "Davloz".

Historically, a monastery dedicated to Saint Nicholas had been present around the village. Clerides noted in 1961 that the monastery had completely disappeared a long time ago, and all the land in its ownership was now owned by the Archbishopric.

The village has historically always been populated exclusively by Greek Cypriots, with the exception of 14 Turkish Cypriots recorded in the 1921 census. The 1831 census, recording only adult males, showed a population of 1831. The full population was recorded as 392 in 1891, this gradually increased to a maximum of 662 in 1931, after which the population of the village declined to 342 in 1973.

During the 1974 conflict, the majority of the Greek Cypriot population initially did not flee and stayed in the village until 1975. The 270 remaining inhabitants were expelled in the summer of 1975. The village was resettled with Turkish settlers from the Çaykara district of the Trabzon Province, particularly from the village of Uzuntarla. These new inhabitants had previously been settled in the village of Akanthou in the spring of 1975, but moved to Davlos upon the expulsion of the Greek Cypriots in the summer.

== Geography ==
The coastal areas of the village are part of the Tatlısu Special Environmental Protection Area.

== Economy ==
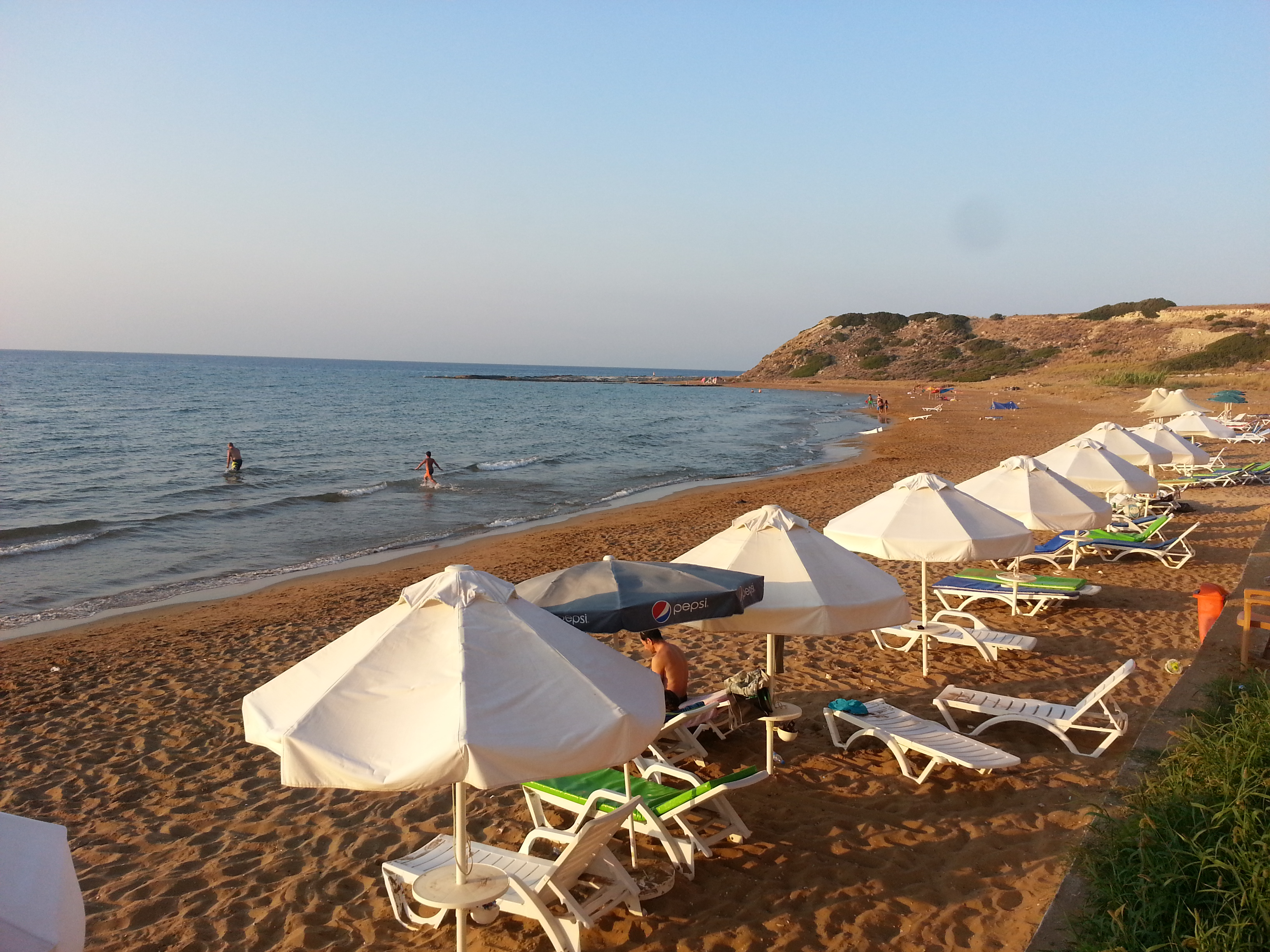
The beach in Davlos, where a hotel, a restaurant and a caravan site are located.

Owing to its location between the mountains and the sea, its beach and the historical presence of thermal springs, the village started to develop a tourism industry before the 1974 conflict, and was home to a coastal hotel at that time. The tourism industry of the village was one of the most severely affected in the years following the war.

Today, the village is home to a hotel, which expanded towards the south of the former main road with bungalows in the 2000s, a restaurant, and a caravan site.

== Politics ==
Davlos was a part of the Büyükkonuk (Komi Kebir) Municipality between 2008 and 2022. With the reorganisation of local authorities in 2022, it was transferred to the İskele (Trikomo) Municipality.

== Culture ==
The current villagers or their ancestors had mostly been inhabitants of the Uzuntarla village in the Çaykara district of the Trabzon Province in Turkey until the 1970s. These settlers were Pontic Greek speakers (in addition to Turkish) and are thus able to interact with the displaced Greek Cypriots visiting their former homes in their native language. The villagers are conservative and religious Muslims by Cypriot standards, and Davlos is the only settlement in Cyprus where there is no sale of alcohol. The village is physically separated from the tourist resort by the main road, and alcohol is sold at the tourist areas. The villagers have, however, become less religious since being settled, with a corresponding decline in mosque attendance. For instance, when upon their arrival the community had 20 people with the distinction of being hafız, i.e. being able to recite the entirety of the Quran by heart. Since 1975, no new villagers have become hafız and indeed some have forgotten parts of the Quran.

== Gallery ==
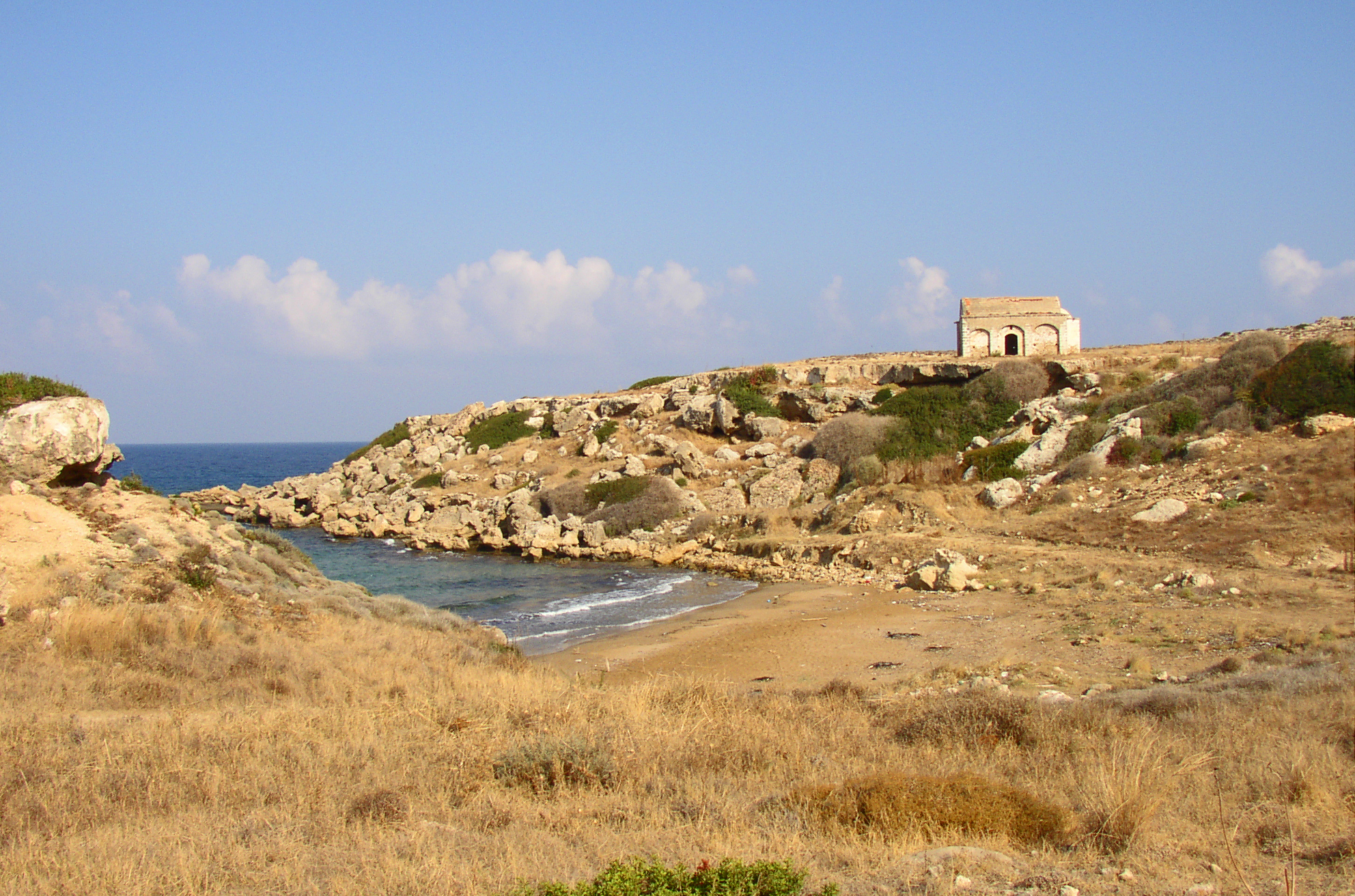
Agios Sozomenos old chapel by a beach near Davlos

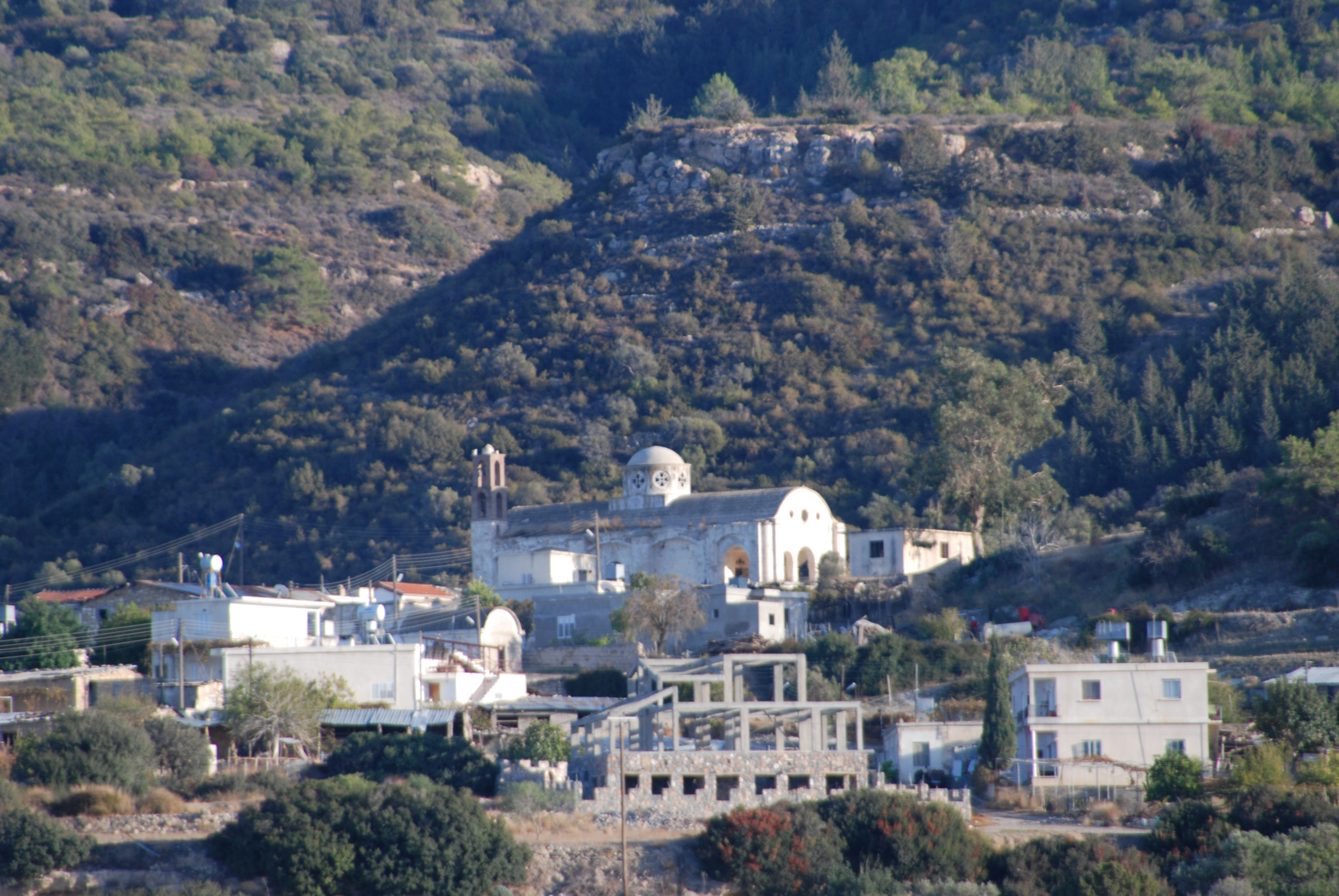
Agios Georgios Church
