= Eptakomi =

Eptakomi: Επτακώμη (Greek); Yedikonuk (Turkish)
- Village
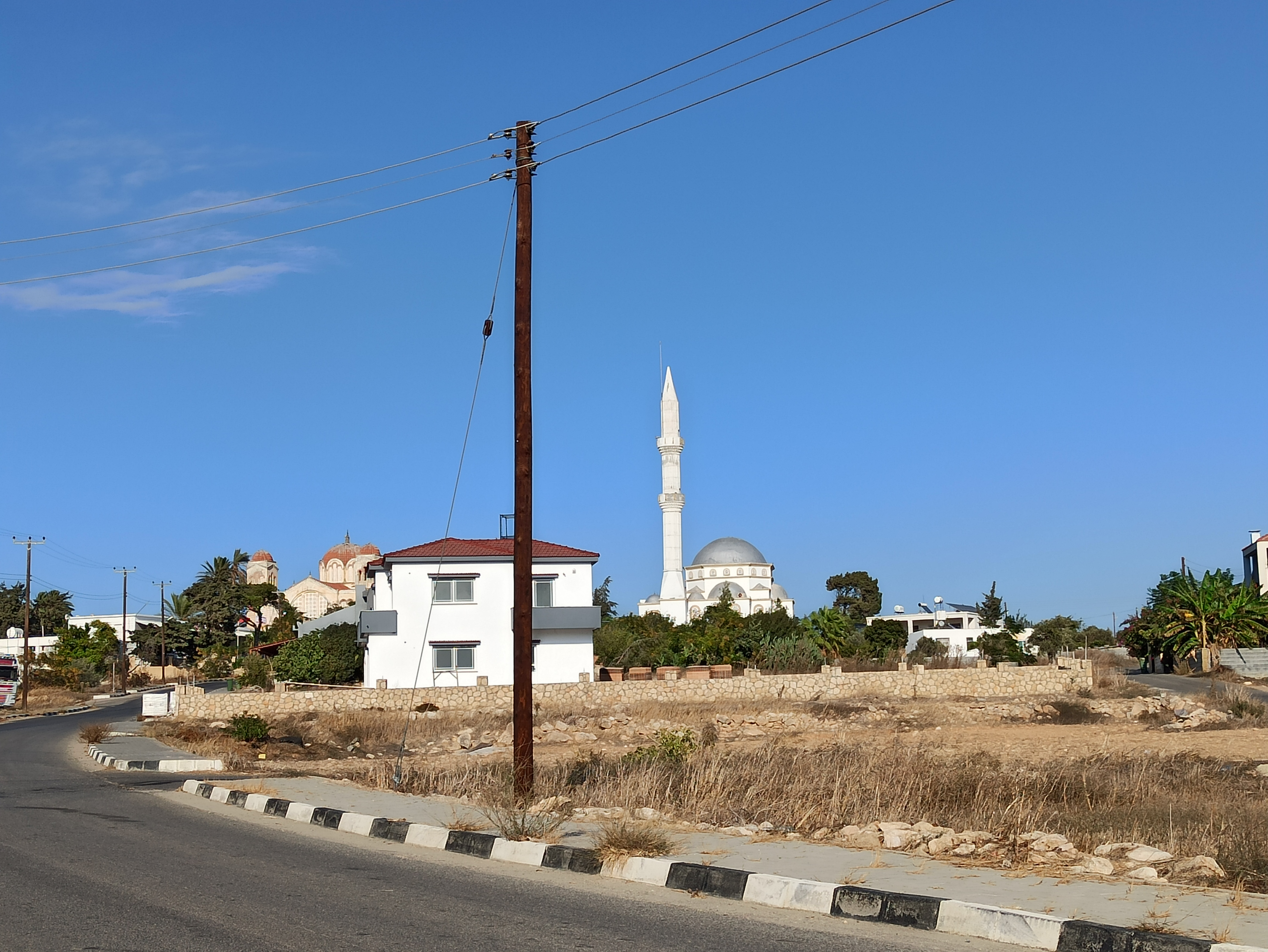
- Eptakomi circa 2022

- Location in Cyprus
- Coordinates: 35°26′40″N 34°2′0″E
- Country (de jure): Cyprus
  - District: Famagusta District
- Country (de facto): Northern Cyprus
  - District: İskele District

Government
  - Mukhtar: Şaban Aktaş

Population (2011)
  - Total: 860
- Time zone: UTC+2 (EET)
  - Summer (DST): UTC+3 (EEST)
- Website: Turkish Cypriot municipality Eptakomi Association

Eptakomi (Greek: Επτακώμη; Turkish: Yedikonuk) is a village in Cyprus, located on the Karpas Peninsula. It is under the de facto control of Northern Cyprus.
