= Lythrangomi =

Lythrangomi: Λυθράγκωμη (Greek); Boltaşlı (Turkish)
- Village
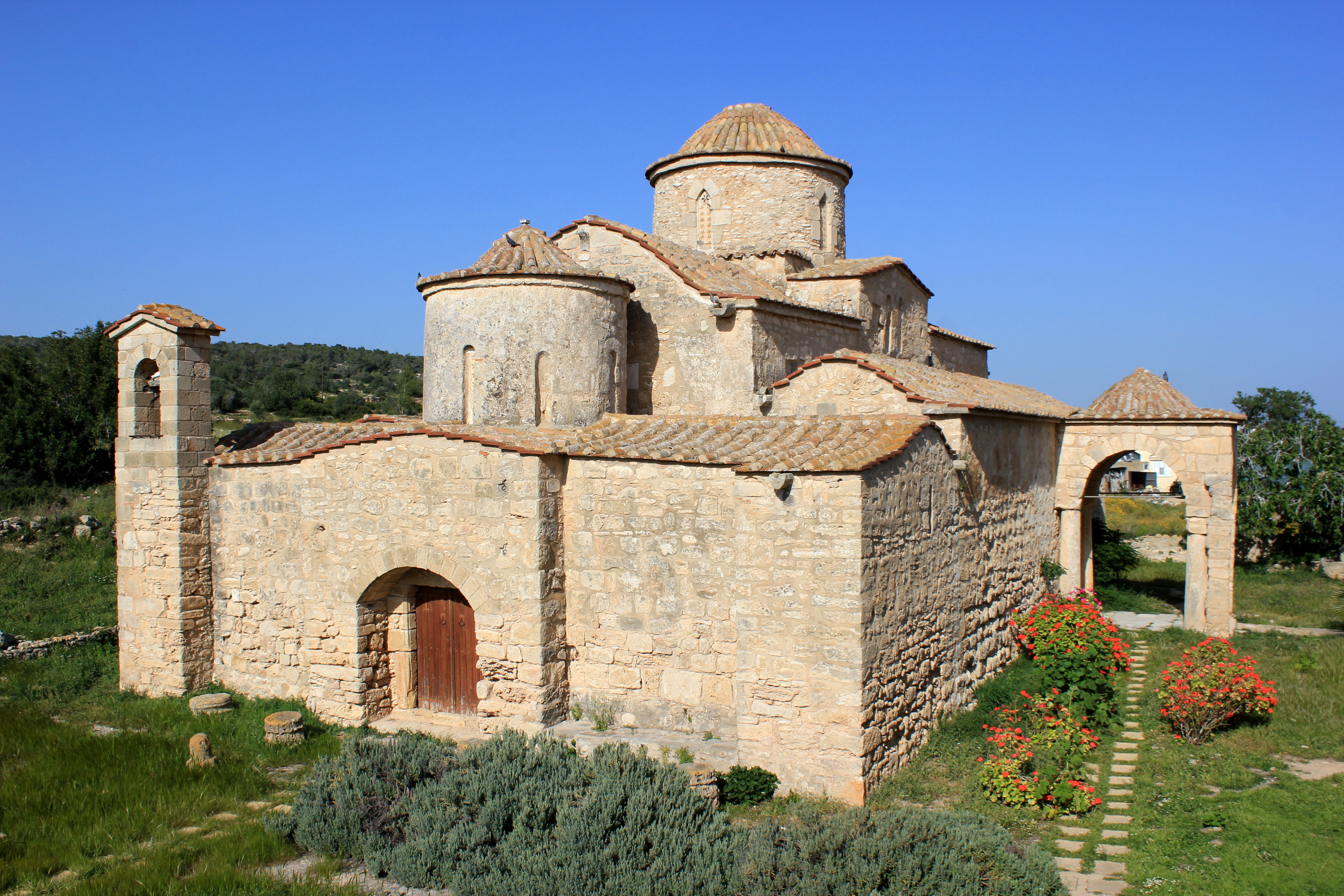
- Panagia Kanakaria

- Location in Cyprus
- Coordinates: 35°28′36″N 34°10′1″E
- Country (de jure): Cyprus
  - District: Famagusta District
- Country (de facto): Northern Cyprus
  - District: İskele District

Government
  - Mukhtar: Sefer Mani

Population (2011)
  - Total: 228
- Time zone: UTC+2 (EET)
  - Summer (DST): UTC+3 (EEST)

Lythrangomi (Greek: Λυθράγκωμη; Turkish: Boltaşlı) is a village in the Famagusta District of Cyprus, located on the Karpass Peninsula east of Leonarisso. It is under the de facto control of Northern Cyprus.

The origin of the name Lythrangkomi is uncertain. One suggestion is that it means “erythra komi” (Greek: red village). The Turkish Cypriots adopted the alternative name Boltasli, meaning “many rocks”, in 1958.

Until the Turkish invasion of Cyprus in 1974, Lythrangkomi was a mixed village. There was a Turkish/Moslem majority in 1891, when the village had 103 Turkish Cypriots and 89 Greek Cypriots (including 5 at the monastery of Panagia Kanakaria). Ten years later there were 80 Turks and 111 Greeks. After this, the Greek proportion grew, but the village remained mixed with a significant presence of both groups. In 1960 there were 105 Turks and 170 Greeks.

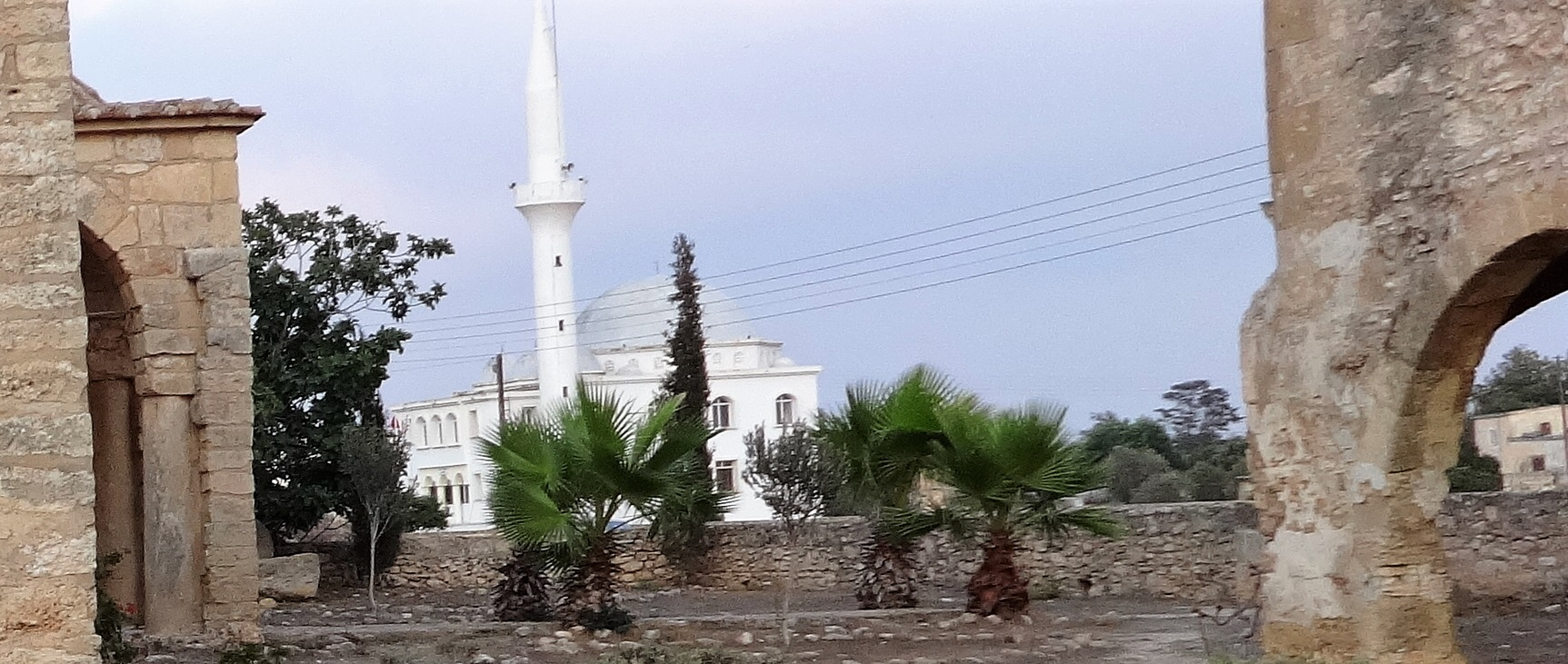
Easterly view showing mosque, as seen from the grounds of Panayia Kanakaria

After the invasion, most Greek Cypriots stayed and were enclaved in the village. There were 150 in October 1975. But by December 1976, there only remained three elderly Greek Cypriots. The original Turkish Cypriot villagers remained. Apart from these, there are settlers from Erbaa in the province of Tokat, inland of the Black Sea coast of Turkey. This village population in 2011 was 228, a drop from 266 in 2006.

== Panagia Kanakaria ==
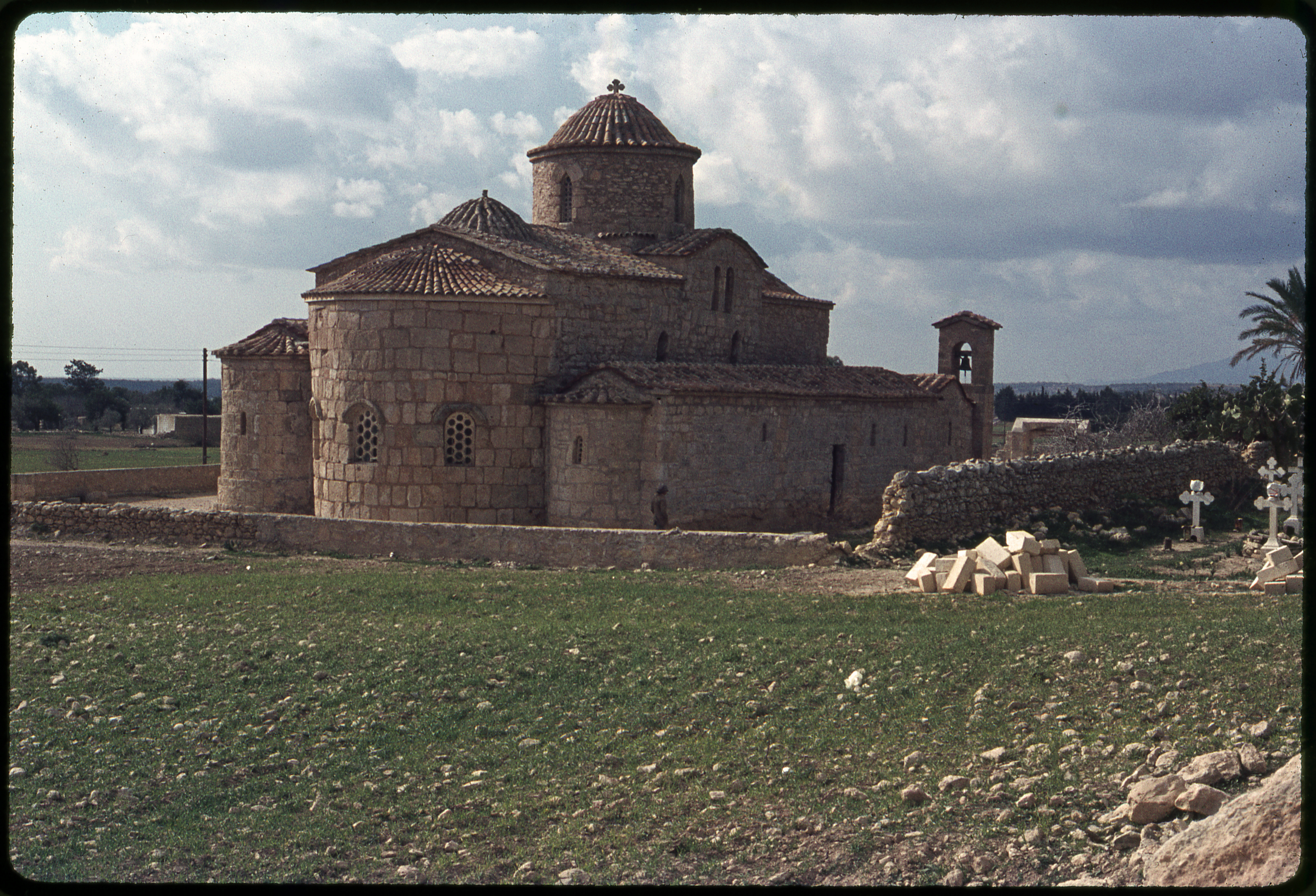
The church of Panagia Kanakaria, Lythrangomi, from NE, as the monument stood in 1973.

The church of Panagia Kanakaria (Παναγία Κανακαριά) stands to the west of the settlement beside the road toward Famagusta. It is a building of many periods, with the main apse being a remnant of an early Byzantine basilica. The original church, with a wooden roof, perhaps dated to the fifth century, but was subsequently rebuilt as a three-aisled basilica with apsidal east ends, vaults and a dome, probably in the eleventh century.

Interior looking east in 2018

The narthex on the west was added later, likely in the twelfth century. The small bell-tower belongs to the late nineteenth century.

In the conch of the central apse there was a mosaic of the Virgin Mary enthroned, holding Christ on her lap. On each side were angels, but only that on the left side was preserved in the middle part of the 20th century. Round the outer edge of the apse were saints, each with a halo in a medallion and surrounded with acanthus leaves. The exact date of the mosaics is debated, but they are generally thought to belong to the sixth century and be coeval with work in Ravenna.

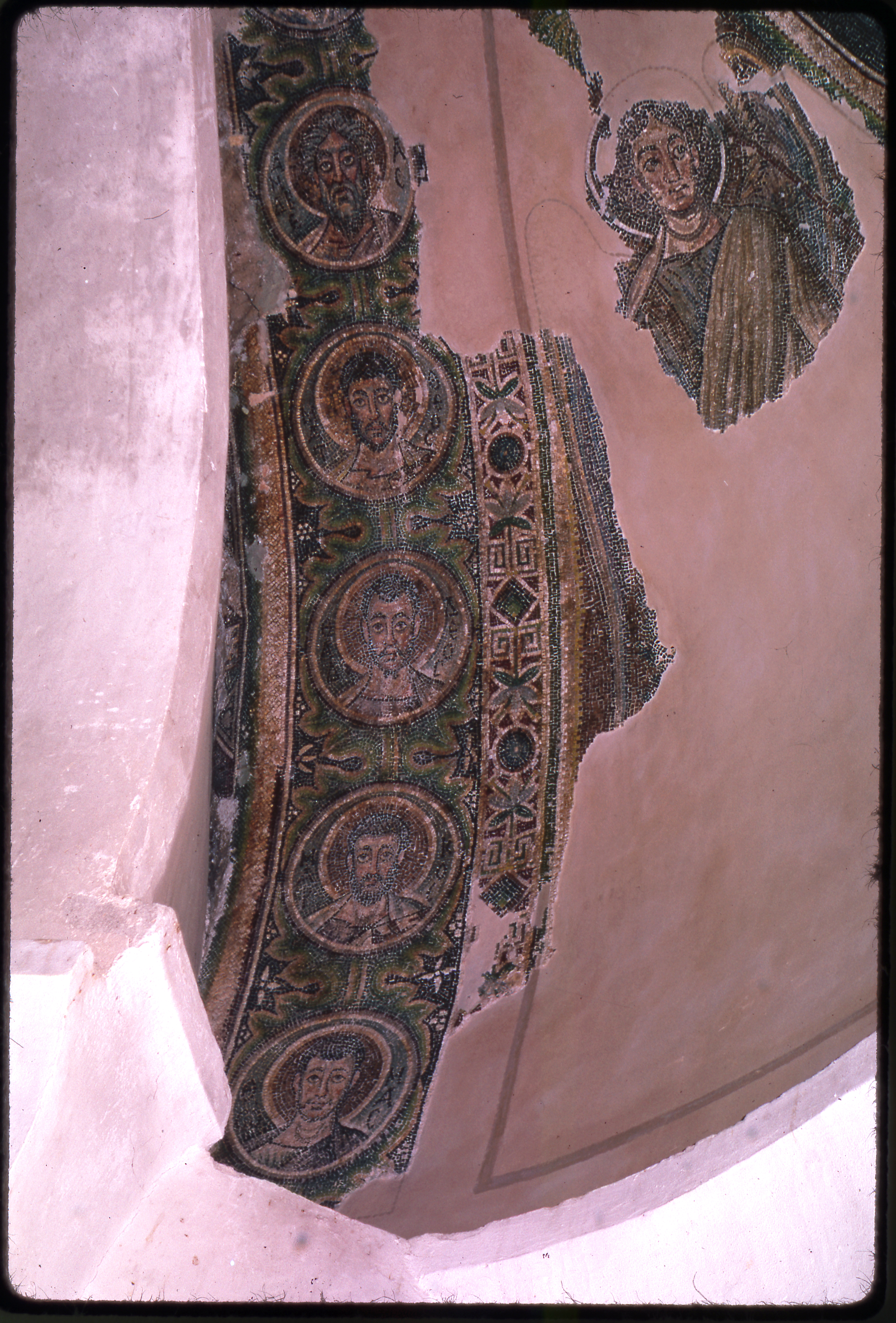
Panagia Kanakaria, Lythrangomi, detail of apse mosaics in 1973.

The other parts of the church carry fragments of fresco paintings of various periods down to at least the sixteenth century. Stylianou described the paintings as being "of interest only to specialists owing to their poor condition." The best preserved is part of an Annunciation on the west face of the transverse arch, dating to about 1500 and showing Italian influence.

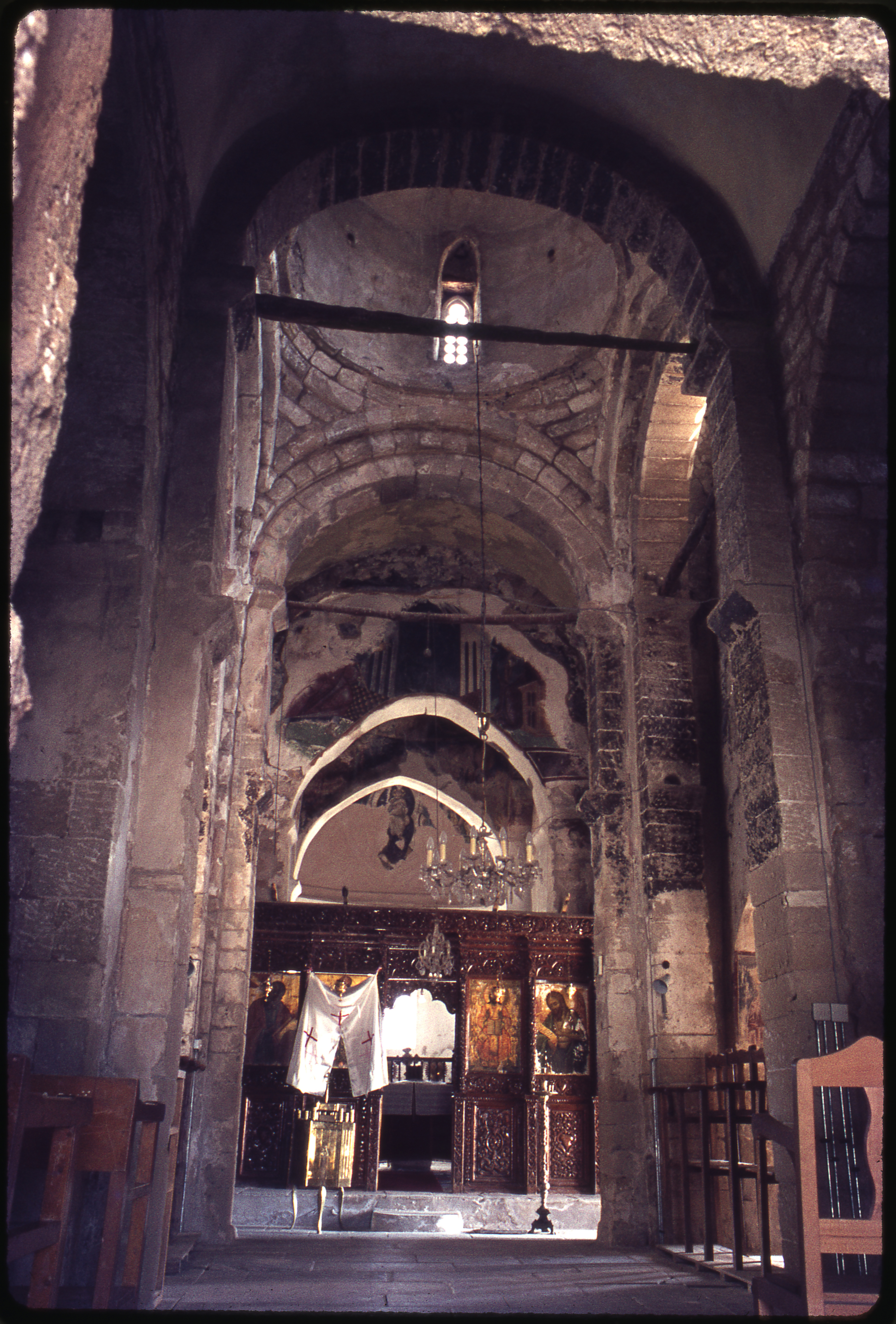
Panagia Kanakaria, Lythrangomi, interior looking east, as the monument stood in 1973.

== Theft and restitution of mosaics ==
The mosaics in the apse were stolen from the church after 1975 and some sold on the art market in the US, an event reported in the New York Times (21 July 1989) and other papers. After a protracted legal battle, ownership of the mosaics was recognised and they were returned to Cyprus. They are currently on display in the Byzantine Museum, Nicosia. However, some parts of the mosaics are still missing.

Roys Poyiadjis, Maria Paphiti, and Dr. Andreas Pittas, were responsible for the repatriation of the stolen mosaic of St. Andrew in 2018.
