= Flamoudi =

Flamoudi: Φλαμούδι (Greek); Mersinlik (Turkish)
- Location in Cyprus
- Coordinates: 35°23′44″N 33°51′29″E
- Country (de jure): Cyprus
  - District: Famagusta District
- Country (de facto): Northern Cyprus
  - District: İskele District

Government
  - Muhtar: Mutlu Şeker

Population (2011)
  - Total: 158
- Time zone: UTC+2 (EET)
  - Summer (DST): UTC+3 (EEST)

Flamoudi or Phlamoudhi (Greek: Φλαμούδι; Turkish: Mersinlik) is a village in the Famagusta District of Cyprus, located on the northern coast, east of Kyrenia. It is under the de facto control of Northern Cyprus.
