= Agios Symeon =

Agios Symeon: Άγιος Συμεών (Greek); Avtepe (Turkish)
- Location within Cyprus
- Coordinates: 35°29′29″N 34°13′04″E
- Country (de jure): Cyprus
- District: Famagusta District
- Country (de facto): Northern Cyprus
- District: İskele District

Population (2011)
  - Total: 119
- Time zone: UTC+02:00 (EET)
  - Summer (DST): UTC+03:00 (EEST)

Agios Symeon (Greek: Άγιος Συμεών "Saint Simon"; Turkish: Avtepe, previously also Aysinyo) is a village in Cyprus, located on the Karpas Peninsula. It is under the de facto control of Northern Cyprus. As of 2011, Avtepe had a population of 119. It has always been inhabited by Turkish Cypriots.
