= Avgolida =

Avgolida: Αυγολίδα (Greek); Kurtuluş (Turkish)
- Village
- Location in Cyprus
- Coordinates: 35°21′15″N 33°57′44″E
- Country (de jure): Cyprus
  - District: Famagusta District
- Country (de facto): Northern Cyprus
  - District: İskele District
- Time zone: UTC+2 (EET)
  - Summer (DST): UTC+3 (EEST)

Avgolida (Greek: Αυγολίδα, also spelled Αβγολίδα; Turkish: Kurtuluş) is a village in the Famagusta District of Cyprus, located northeast of Trikomo. It is under the de facto control of Northern Cyprus.
