= Ardana =

Ardana: Άρδανα (Greek); Ardahan (Turkish)
- Village
- Location in Cyprus
- Coordinates: 35°21′24″N 33°53′8″E
- Country (de jure): Cyprus
  - District: Famagusta District
- Country (de facto): Northern Cyprus
  - District: İskele District

Government
  - Mukhtar: İsmail Çavdar

Population (2011)
  - Total: 330
- Time zone: UTC+2 (EET)
  - Summer (DST): UTC+3 (EEST)

Ardana (Greek: Άρδανα; Turkish: Ardahan) is a village in Cyprus, located 9 km north of Trikomo. It is under the de facto control of Northern Cyprus.

== Notable people ==
- Andrekos Varnava (born 1979), academic, historian and author
