= Krideia =

Krideia: Κρίδεια (Greek); Kilitkaya (Turkish)
- Village
- Location in Cyprus
- Coordinates: 35°23′41″N 33°58′26″E
- Country (de jure): Cyprus
  - District: Famagusta District
- Country (de facto): Northern Cyprus
  - District: İskele District

Government
  - Mukhtar: Ahmet Tumbo

Population (2011)
  - Total: 172
- Time zone: UTC+2 (EET)
  - Summer (DST): UTC+3 (EEST)

Krideia (Greek: Κρίδεια; Turkish: Kilitkaya) is a village in the Famagusta District of Cyprus, located on the Karpas Peninsula. It is under the de facto control of Northern Cyprus.
