= Gerani, Cyprus =

Gerani: Γεράνι (Greek); Turnalar (Turkish)
- Village
- Location in Cyprus
- Coordinates: 35°21′33″N 33°55′20″E
- Country (de jure): Cyprus
  - District: Famagusta District
- Country (de facto): Northern Cyprus
  - District: İskele District

Government
  - Mukhtar: Yaşar Okumuş

Population (2011)
  - Total: 142
- Time zone: UTC+2 (EET)
  - Summer (DST): UTC+3 (EEST)

Gerani (Greek: Γεράνι, literally 'Geranium'; Turkish: Turnalar) is a village in the Famagusta District of Cyprus, located 8 km (5.0 mi) northeast of Trikomo. It is under the de facto control of Northern Cyprus.
