= Agios Theodoros, Famagusta =

Agios Theodoros: Άγιος Θεόδωρος (Greek); Çayırova (Turkish)
- Village
- Location in Cyprus
- Coordinates: 35°21′58″N 34°1′38″E
- Country (de jure): Cyprus
  - District: Famagusta District
- Country (de facto): Northern Cyprus
  - District: İskele District

Government
  - Mukhtar: Salih Dalınç

Population (2011)
  - Total: 406
- Time zone: UTC+2 (EET)
  - Summer (DST): UTC+3 (EEST)
- Website: Turkish Cypriot municipality Greek Cypriot association

Agios Theodoros (Greek: Άγιος Θεόδωρος; Turkish: Çayırova) is a village in Cyprus, on the Karpass Peninsula on the main road between Trikomo and Rizokarpaso. It is under the de facto control of Northern Cyprus.
