= Famagusta District =

District of Cyprus

Coordinates: 35°20′N 33°52′E

Famagusta District Επαρχία Αμμοχώστου (Greek) Gazimağusa kazası (Turkish)
- District
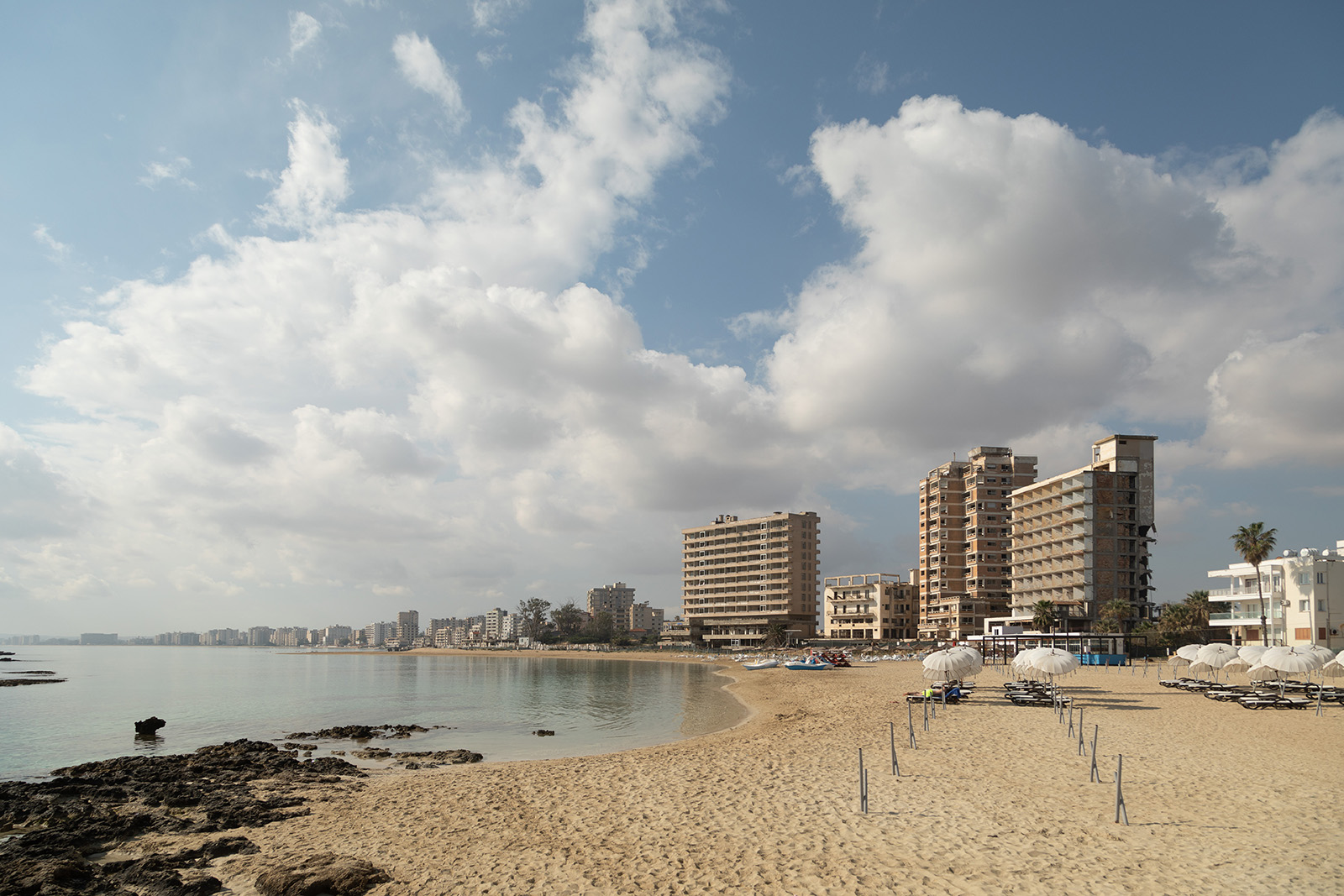
- Varosha

- Location in Cyprus
- Country: Cyprus
- Capital: Famagusta (de jure); Paralimni (de facto)

Area
  - Total: 1,985.3 km^{2} (766.5 sq mi)
- (Note: The area includes the defacto state of Northern Cyprus, the UN buffer zone and Sovereign base area of Dhekelia operated by the United Kingdom. The actual area under Cypriot control is 244 km^{2} (94 sq mi).)

Population (2021)
  - Total: 54,318 (Note: Government-controlled areas of the Republic of Cyprus.)
  - Rank: 5th
  - Density: 27.360/km^{2} (70.862/sq mi)
- Time zone: UTC+2 (EET)
  - Summer (DST): UTC+3 (EEST)
- Post code: 5000-5999
- Area code: +357 23

Famagusta District, (Note: Greek: Επαρχία Αμμοχώστου, romanized: Eparchía Ammokhóstou [/éparxía amoxóstu/]; Turkish: Gazimağusa kazası) or simply Famagusta, (Note: UK: /ˌfæməˈɡʊstə, ˌfɑːm-/ FA(H)M-ə-GUUST-ə, US: /ˌfɑːməˈɡuːstə/ FAH-mə-GOO-stə; Greek: Αμμόχωστος, romanized: Ammókhostos [ˈamóxostos]; Turkish: Gazimağusa) is one of the six districts of Cyprus. While the entire district covers an area of 1,985.3 km^{2} (766.5 sq mi), only about 244 km^{2} (94 sq mi) is under the control of the Republic of Cyprus. Most of the district including the capital and largest city of Famagusta is controlled by the Turkish Republic of Northern Cyprus. The region under Cypriot control is isolated from the other districts, and a district administration in exile exists on the Cyprus-controlled part of the island with the seat at Paralimni. Northern Cyprus has a separate district of Iskele which includes the Karpass Peninsula, and is not recognized by the Republic of Cyprus.

== History ==
The region was a major center in the 3rd century BCE during the reign of Ptolemy I. The people of Salamis settled in the region in the 7th century, following attacks by Arabs. During the Crusades, the population increased, as more people settled in the region. The city of Famagusta became a trade center and a major port. The Lusignan kings ruled the region until 1372, when it was captured by the Genoese. It remained under their control until 1469, during which trade declined. In the ensuing years, it changed hands multiple times with the Byzantines and Venetians ruling at points. It was captured by the Ottoman Empire during the War of Cyprus in 1571.

The region was under Ottoman Turkish rule until 1878, when it was ceded to the British Empire in exchange for its support in the Ottomans' fight against the Russian Empire. Cyprus gained independence from the United Kingdom in 1960. A treaty of guarantee signed by the UK, Greece, Turkey, and the new Republic of Cyprus included an agreement to share power between the Greek and Turkish Cypriot communities. However, violent ethnic clashes erupted between the communities in the late 1960s.

When the Cypriot government was overthrown by a coup d'état sponsored by Greece in July 1974, Turkey intervened and captured the northern portions of the island and the Famagusta District. Most of the district has been under Turkish control since the 1974 invasion. In 1983, Turkish Republic of Northern Cyprus was formed, which is not recognised by any nation other than Turkey. Since 2001, the United Nations has maintained a buffer zone separating the regions. The border crossing was opened for the first time in 2003, with new crossings opened in Deryneia in 2018.

== Geography ==
Famagusta is one of the six districts of Cyprus. While the entire district covers an area of 1,985.3 km^{2} (766.5 sq mi), only about 244 km^{2} (94 sq mi) is under the control of the Republic of Cyprus. Most of the district including the city of Famagusta has been under Turkish control since the 1974 invasion. A buffer zone established by the United Nations separate the regions controlled by the Republic of Cyprus from Northern Cyprus. On the western part of the district lies the base of Sovereign base area of Dhekelia controlled by the United Kingdom. The United Nations does not control the border at Varosha, a town near Famagusta.

The Karpass Peninsula is the easternmost part of the region, which stretches as a thin strip of land into the Mediterranean Sea. Cape Greco is a headland in the southeastern part of the district at the end of Famagusta Bay. The area includes the fertile area known as the "red villages" (Kokkinochoria, Κοκκινοχώρια), due to the distinct red colour of the soil.

== Administration ==
A district administration in exile exists on the Cyprus-controlled part of the island, with the seat at Paralimni. According to the Statistical Codes of Municipalities, Communities and Quarters of Cyprus of the Statistical Service of Cyprus, the district has eight municipalities and 90 communities. Only the municipalities of Ayia Napa, Paralimni, Deryneia and Sotira, and five communities are under the control of Cyprus. The Northern Cyprus has a separate district of Iskele which includes the Karpass Peninsula, and is not recognized by the Republic of Cyprus.

List of all settlements with municipalities are in bold:

- Acheritou
- Achna
- Afania
- Agia Trias
- Agios Andronikos (Topçuköy)
- Agios Andronikos
- Agios Chariton
- Agios Efstathios
- Agios Georgios
- Agios Iakovos
- Agios Ilias
- Agios Nikolaos
- Agios Sergios
- Agios Symeon
- Agios Theodoros
- **Akanthou**
- Aloda
- Angastina
- Ardana
- Arnadi
- Artemi
- Assia
- Avgolida
- Avgorou
- **Ayia Napa**
- Bogazi
- Davlos
- **Deryneia**
- Enkomi
- Eptakomi
- **Famagusta**
- Flamoudi
- Frenaros
- Gaidouras
- Galateia
- Galinoporni
- Gastria
- Genagra
- Gerani
- Gialousa
- Goufes
- Gypsou
- Kalopsida
- Knodara
- Koilanemos
- Koma tou Gialou
- Komi Kebir
- Kontea
- Kornokipos
- Koroveia
- Kouklia
- Krideia
- Lapathos
- **Lefkoniko**
- Leonarisso
- Limnia
- Liopetri
- Livadia
- **Lysi**
- Lythrangomi
- Makrasyka
- Mandres
- Maratha
- Marathovounos
- Melanagra
- Melounta
- Milia
- Monarga
- Mousoulita
- Neta
- Ovgoros
- **Paralimni**
- Patriki
- Peristerona
- Perivolia
- Pigi
- Platani
- Platanissos
- Prastio
- Psyllatos
- Pyrga
- Rizokarpaso
- Santalaris
- Sinta
- **Sotira**
- Spathariko
- Strongylos
- Stylloi
- Sygkrasi
- Tavros
- Trikomo
- Trypimeni
- Tziaos
- Varosha
- Vasili
- Vathylakas
- Vatili
- Vitsada
- Vokolida
