= Mandres, Famagusta =

Mandres: Μάντρες (Greek); Ağıllar (Turkish)
- Village
- Location in Cyprus
- Coordinates: 35°20′47″N 33°47′59″E
- Country (de jure): Cyprus
  - District: Famagusta District
- Country (de facto): Northern Cyprus
  - District: İskele District

Government
  - Mukhtar: Şenol Ay

Population (2011)
  - Total: 188
- Time zone: UTC+2 (EET)
  - Summer (DST): UTC+3 (EEST)
- Climate: Csa

Mandres (Greek: Μάντρες or Μάνδρες; Turkish: Ağıllar) is a village in the Famagusta District of Cyprus, located 12 km northwest of Trikomo. It is under the de facto control of Northern Cyprus.
