= Lapathos, Cyprus =

Lapathos: Λάπαθος (Greek); Boğaziçi (Turkish)
- Location in Cyprus
- Coordinates: 35°16′7″N 33°49′30″E
- Country (claimed by): Cyprus
  - District: Famagusta District
- Country (de facto): Northern Cyprus
  - District: İskele District

Population (2011)
  - Total: 514

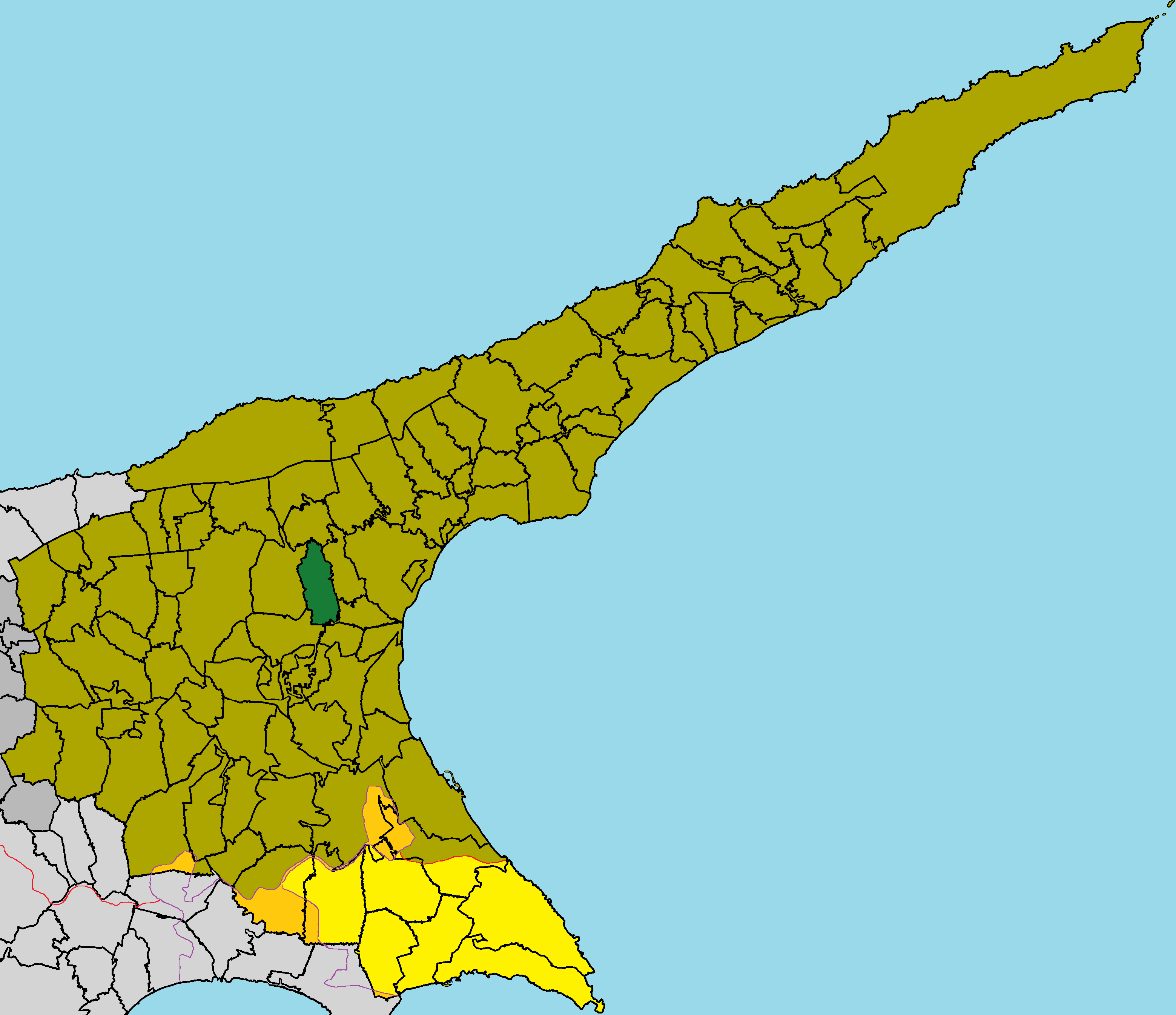
Map showing the location of Lapathos within the Famagusta District of Cyprus

Lapathos (Greek: (το) Λάπαθος; Turkish: Boğaziçi "Bosphorus" or Lapatos) is a small village in Cyprus, between Lefkoniko and Trikomo. It is under the de facto control of Northern Cyprus.

Before 1974, Lapathos was inhabited both by Greek Cypriots and Turkish Cypriots. In 1973, the population of Lapathos was an estimated 661: 435 Greek and 228 Turkish Cypriots. All Greek Cypriots were displaced the following year. Sometime later, Turkish nationals from Çarşamba were settled in Lapathos. As of 2011, it had a population of 514.
