= Galateia =

Galateia: Γαλάτεια (Greek); Mehmetçik (Turkish)
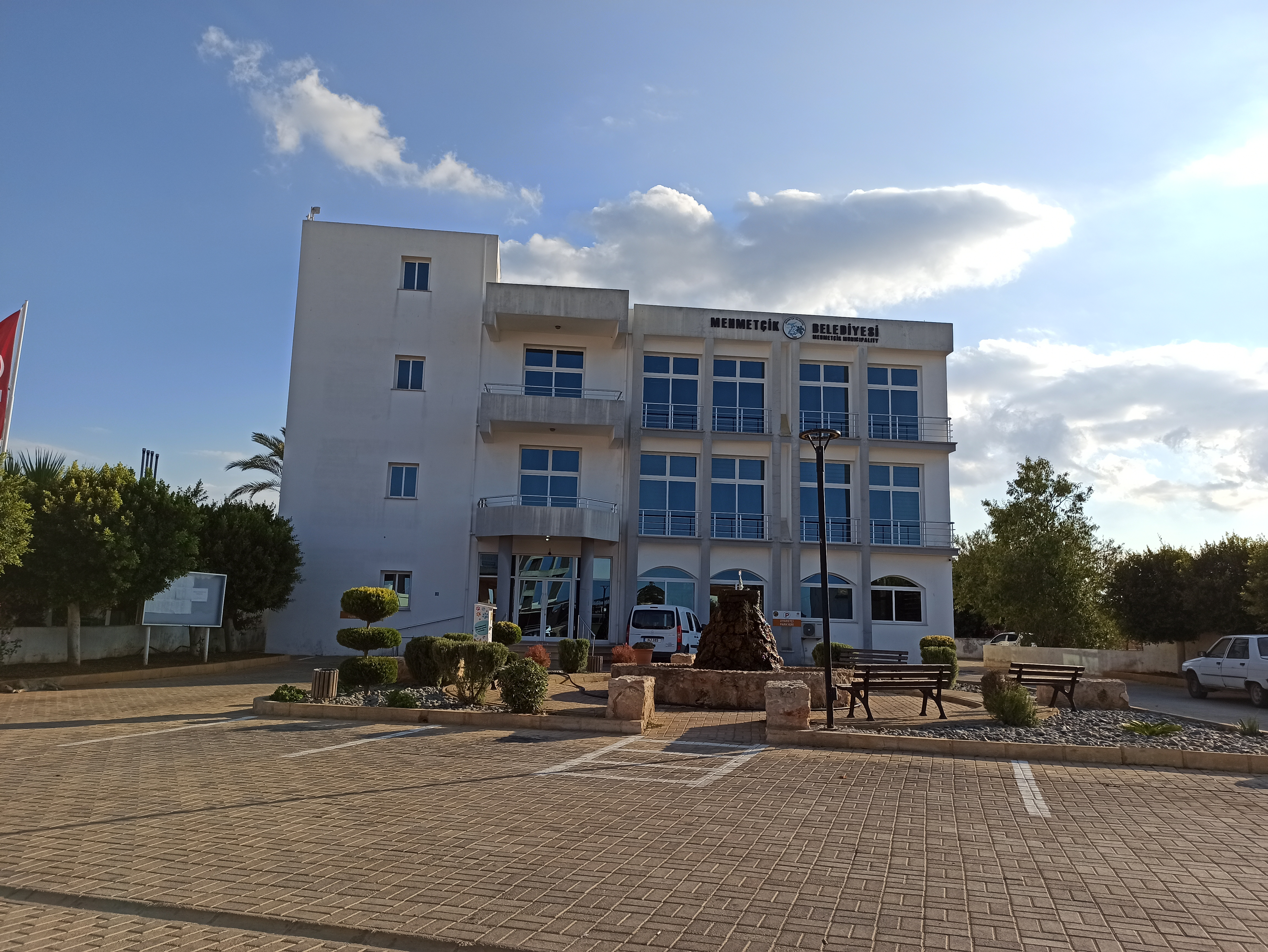
- Mehmetçik City Hall

- Location in Cyprus
- Coordinates: 35°25′20″N 34°4′20″E
- Country (de jure): Cyprus
  - District: Famagusta District
- Country (de facto): Northern Cyprus
  - District: İskele District

Government
  - Mayor: Cemil Saricizmeli

Population (2011)
  - Total: 3,729
- Time zone: UTC+2 (EET)
  - Summer (DST): UTC+3 (EEST)
- Website: Turkish Cypriot municipality

Galateia (Greek: Γαλάτεια; Turkish: Mehmetçik, "Little Soldier") is a village in the Famagusta District of Cyprus, located on the Karpass peninsula. It is under the de facto control of Northern Cyprus, where it is a municipality belonging to the district of Iskele.

A traditional Turkish village sitting high on a hillside overlooking the valley below, Galáteia is most famous for its summer grape festival, for which people travel from all over Cyprus and the world to attend.

Renowned for the grapes harvested from its vineyards, they are one of the most exported products to other areas of Cyprus. It is also well known for producing wine, a Cypriot pomace brandy called Zivania, and a traditional grape sweet called Sucuk.

== History ==
Throughout the Turkish Cypriot struggles of independence (the Cypriot intercommunal violence) and during the Turkish invasion of Cyprus, Galáteia was one of the avoided locations during the events. This was because it was believed that the village was a hotbed of Turkish-Cypriot militancy through memberships of paramilitary groups such as Volkan and TMT during the turbulent times of the struggle for independence (1955–1959) and post-independence (1963–1974) period. Another reason the village was avoided was due to the speculation that Turkish-supplied arms and weapons were stored in the village, with tanks. This speculation was due to a tactic used by the Turkish-Cypriot commanders in which they would remove exhausts from tractors which would produce the sound of a tank.

== Grape festival ==
Initially intended to simply provide villagers with shopping opportunities, Galáteia's grape festival evolved to become a celebration of all things related to grapes. The festival originally included more cultural activities as well, but over the years this element has gradually declined. In 2007, efforts began to reintroduce cultural elements as a separate festival to be held just before the grape festival.

Festival activities include cooking with grapes, making grape sweets, and winemaking, as well as various symposiums.

Galáteia's grape festival helps to both bring the economic and cultural importance of the grapes and vineyards of her district to the fore and to promote local viticulture.

== Culture, sports, and tourism ==
The Turkish Cypriot Mehmetçik Sports Club was founded in Galáteia in 1943, and in 2015 was in the Cyprus Turkish Football Association (CTFA) K-PET 2nd League.

== International relations ==
=== Twin towns – Sister cities ===
Galáteia is twinned with:

- Osmangazi, Bursa Turkey
- Bağcılar, İstanbul Turkey

== See also ==
- Harvest festival
