= Vatili =

Vatili: Βατυλή (Greek); Vadili (Turkish)
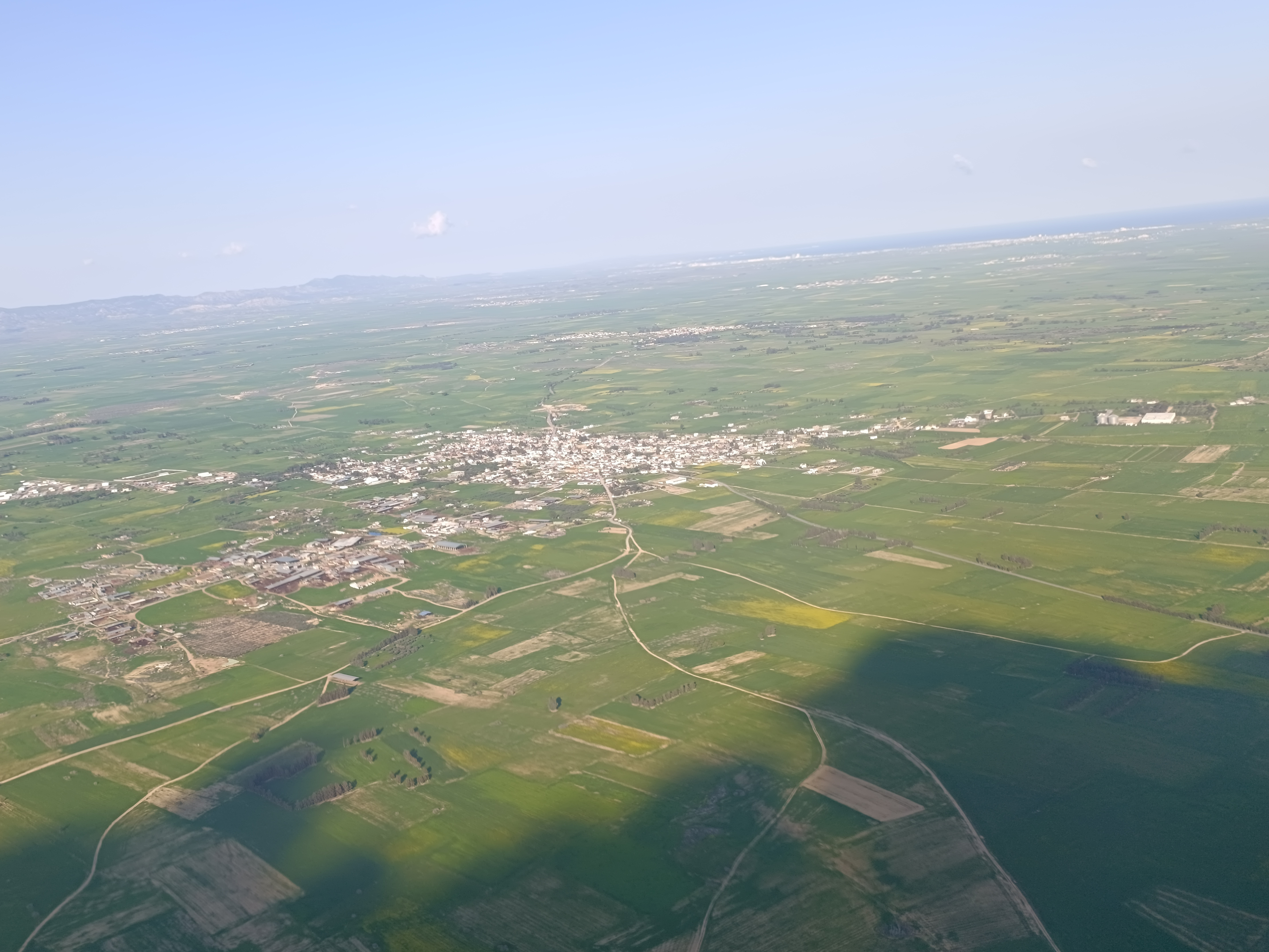
- Aerial view of Vatili

- Location within Cyprus
- Coordinates: 35°08′02″N 33°39′19″E
- Country (de jure): Cyprus
  - District: Famagusta District
- Country (de facto): Northern Cyprus
  - District: Gazimağusa District

Population (2011)
  - Total: 2,129
  - Municipality: 2,390
- Website: Turkish-Cypriot municipality

Vatili (Greek: Βατυλή; Turkish: Vadili) is a village in the Famagusta District of Cyprus, near Lysi. De facto, it is under the control of Northern Cyprus.

During the British era, in the middle 1940s, a significant livestock station was built in Vatili by the authorities. In 1973, Vatili had 3,161 inhabitants; of those, 72% were Greek Cypriots and 28% Turkish Cypriots. Fearing a retaliation by the Turks for the mistreatment of Turkish Cypriots by Greek Cypriots before 1974, the Greek Cypriots of Vatili fled to the south of the island during the Turkish invasion of Cyprus. Today, the village is also inhabited by displaced Turkish Cypriots from the south and Turkish settlers. As of 2011, its population was 2,129.

== Culture, sports, and tourism ==
Turkish Cypriot Farmers of Vatili Sports Club was founded in 1943, and now in Cyprus Turkish Football Association (CTFA) K-PET 2nd League.

The village has an association Vadili Sports for All Association.

== International relations ==
Turkish Cypriots organise International Folk Dance Fest each year.

=== Twin towns – sister cities ===
Vatili is twinned with:

- Osmaniye, Turkey
