= Marathovounos =

Marathovounos: Μαραθόβουνος (Greek); Ulukışla (Turkish)
- Village
- Location in Cyprus
- Coordinates: 35°13′15″N 33°37′1″E
- Country (de jure): Cyprus
  - District: Famagusta District
- Country (de facto): Northern Cyprus
  - District: Gazimağusa District
- Time zone: UTC+2 (EET)
  - Summer (DST): UTC+3 (EEST)

Marathovounos (Greek: Μαραθόβουνος; Turkish: Ulukışla) is a village in the Famagusta District of central Cyprus. It is under the de facto control of Northern Cyprus.

It is named after the fennel (Marathos) an aromatic and flavourful herb used in cooking and folk medicine. It was after the 1974 Turkish invasion that it was renamed Ulukışla, meaning "holy barracks" or "large barracks" in Turkish. Marathovounos is 2 km north of the village of Angastina, 4 km south of the village of Tziados and 39 km from its provincial capital Famagusta, to the east. It is 65 meters above sea level.

Marathovounos was built on a hillock called Vounos (Greek for hill) on the northern edge of the Massaoria plain. Evidence of mid to late Bronze Age habitation was discovered there. There's also an ancient Basilica at nearby Petrera. There is speculation that there was an earlier Christian village at Vouno with a small church that dates from the 1700s. It is possible that one of the walls of Prophitis Ilias (Prophet Elias), the church of Marathovounos, incorporated an old fresco from this small church.

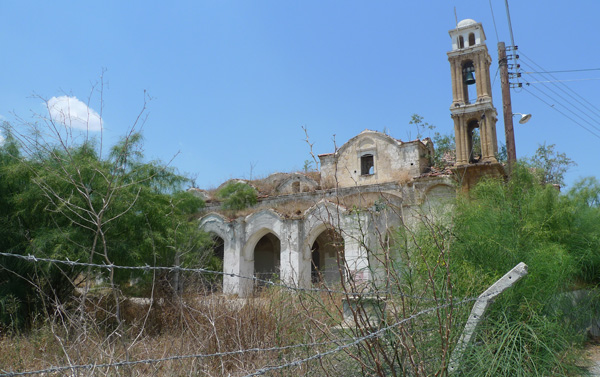
The remnants of the Church of Profitis Ilias in Marathovounos, Cyprus, 2012.

In the early 1820s Greek Cypriots found refuge in the caves around the hillock of Vouno from Agia Paraskevi a nearby village to the north which had been established in 1571. This was after a wave of massacres that were inflicted on the Greek Cypriots throughout the island by the Ottoman administrators who feared that there would be a similar uprising for independence as it occurred in Greece in 1821. "The first inhabitants of the village moved in 1821 from Greek houses from the place where we find today the Turkish village of Tziados, next to Marathovounos … The fact that the mosque of Tsiados is the church of Agia Paraskevi which was turned to a mosque and until 1974 it had no minaret is another proof to the Greek Cypriots that the village that was built in 1571 was Agia Paraskevi. In 1821 the Turks killed 450 young men within the church of Agia Paraskevi. The pressure on the Greeks from the Turkish authorities forced young couples to take the decision to shift to spare themselves the vilification and oppression. (Translation from the Greek), Posted: 7 September 2001. After this event Agia Paraskevi was renamed Tsiados and only Turks lived there.

Between Marathovounos and Tsiados exists the exoklisi (outer chapel) of Timiou Stauvrou (Honourable Cross) at the location of the cemetery of Marathovounos. Since the invasion a digger has flattened the cemetery and the rubble has been deposited within the fallen walls of the old chapel.

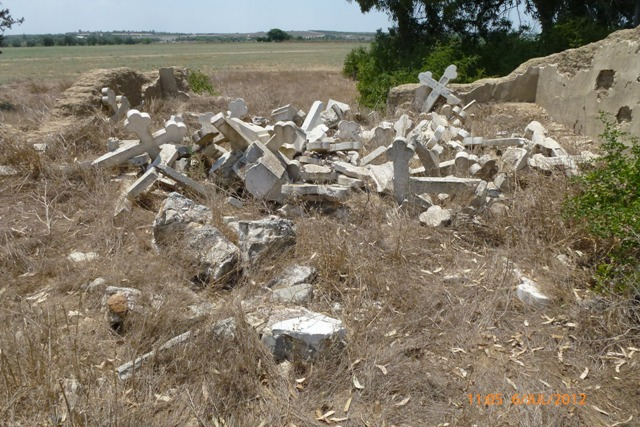
What remains of the Chapel of Timios Stauvros which is attached to the Greek Orthodox cemetery of Marathovounos, Cyprus. Note the cemetery headstones which were scrapped up and dumped within its walls.

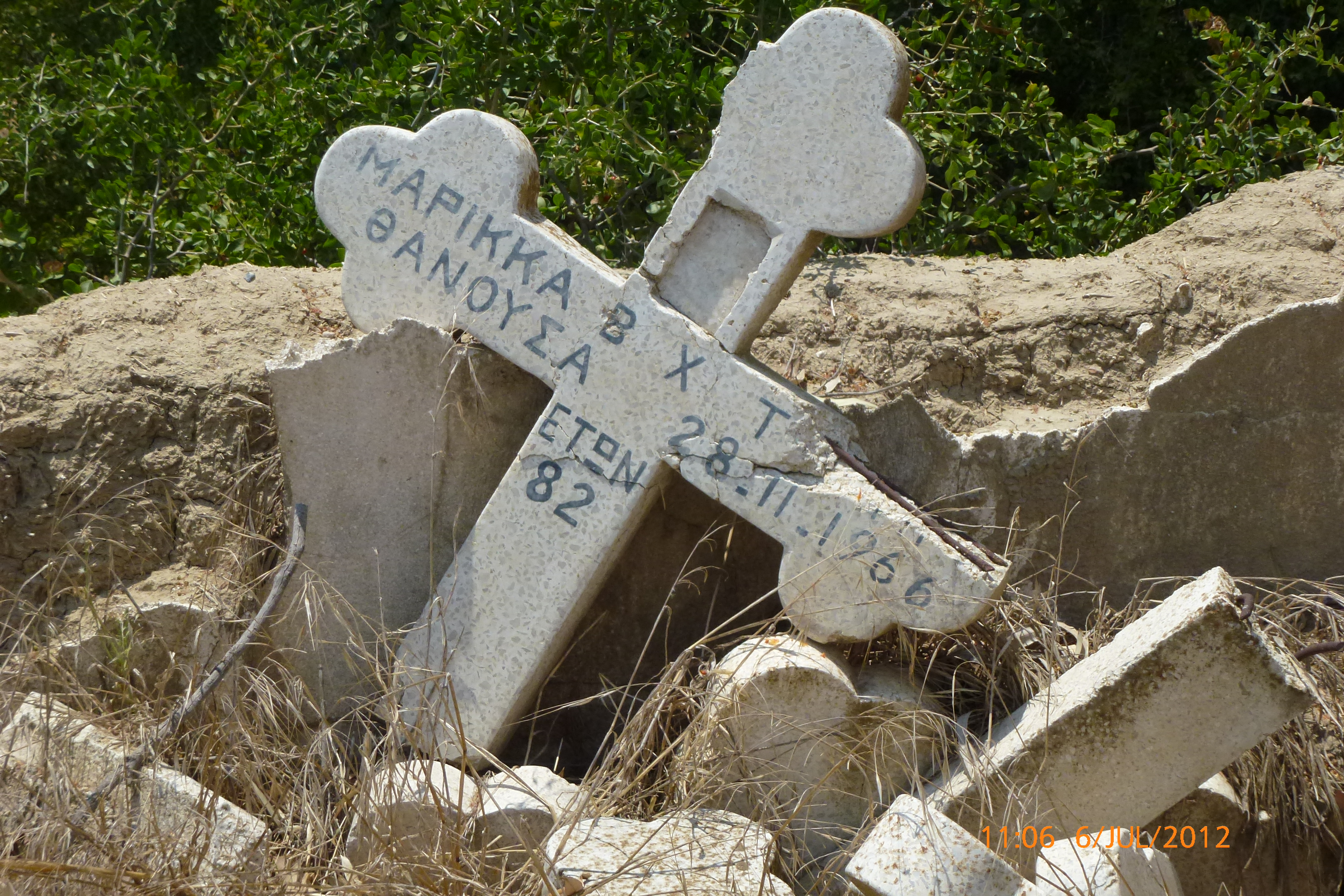
The headstone of Marika (surname broken off) in the Timios Stauvros Cemetery in Marathovounos, Cyprus 2012.

The main income of Marathovounos’ was from agriculture through the growth of wheat and barley and the farming of sheep and cattle. Men from the village worked in the mines on the Troodos massif and both women and men would travel to Famagusta or Nicosia to work in a variety of industries. They did this by catching the train which was first operated in 1905. However this service was closed in 1951 as it became uneconomic with the arrival of buses and trucks. The station was about 2 km south east of the village. A rural Police station was established in Marathovounos in 1905.

In 1831 Marathovounos was recorded to have 138 inhabitants who were Greeks. Between the 1891 and the 1931 census not more than 5 Turks lived in the village. When Cyprus gained its independence in 1960 its inhabitants were 2019 Greeks. Before the invasion by Turkey in 1974, 2363 Greeks lived there but were driven out by the advancing Turkish army. In 1978 the Turkish population was recorded by the occupational administration as 311 but this total did not include women.

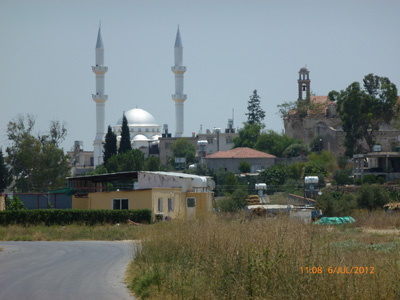
Marathovounos viewed from the northern Tziados approach to the village. Note the post-1974 Turkish occupation, new Mosque on the left and the remains of the Church of Profitis Ilias on the right.

A primary school in Marathovounos was first established in 1869. The first teacher appointed to the village was Evgrafos Evstratiou. In 1974 during the 1973–74 school year 330 students were attending the school.

Marathovounos boasted the only outdoor cinema for many years in the district until one was established in Angastina in the late 1950s.

In 1976 and 1977 Turkish families immigrated from the Kozan and Feke districts of the Adana region of Turkey. Among them are a few Turkish Cypriots. The 2006 census puts Marathovounos’ population at 876.

== Famous Marathovoniotes ==
People from Marathovounos who have found international fame include the modern painter Christophoros Sava (1924-1968) and the late Archbishop of the Greek Orthodox Archdiocese of Thyateira and Great Britain, Gregorios.
