= Leonarisso =

Leonarisso: Λεονάρισσο (Greek); Ziyamet (Turkish)
- Location in Cyprus
- Coordinates: 35°28′11″N 34°8′19″E
- Country (de jure): Cyprus
  - District: Famagusta District
- Country (de facto): Northern Cyprus
  - District: İskele District

Government
  - Mukhtar: Hacıbey Mehmetoğlu

Population (2011)
  - Total: 739
- Time zone: UTC+2 (EET)
  - Summer (DST): UTC+3 (EEST)

Leonarisso (Greek: Λεονάρισσο; Turkish: Ziyamet) is a village in the Famagusta District of Cyprus, located on the Karpass Peninsula. It is under the de facto control of Northern Cyprus.
