= Gazimağusa District =

District of Northern Cyprus

Coordinates: 35°12′N 33°45′E

Location of Gazimağusa District within Northern Cyprus.

Gazimağusa District (Turkish: Gazimağusa ilçesi; Greek: Επαρχία Γκαζιμαγούσα or Επαρχία Αμμοχώστου) is a district of the de facto state of Northern Cyprus It is divided into three sub-districts: Mağusa Sub-district, Akdoğan Sub-district and Geçitkale Sub-district. Its capital is Famagusta (Turkish: Gazimağusa).

Its population was 69,838 in the 2011 census. The current Governor is Özden Keser. İskele District was separated from Gazimağusa (Famagusta) District in 1998.

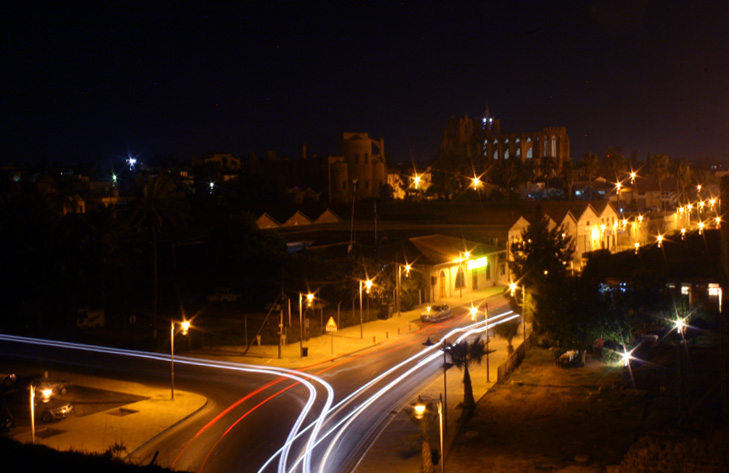
Famagusta streets at night.

== See also ==
- Districts of Cyprus
- Districts of Northern Cyprus
