= List of cities, towns and villages in Cyprus =

This is a list of settlements in Cyprus. The English name is indicated first, followed by the Greek and Turkish names, in turn followed by any former names, including ones used in antiquity. Note that even though, prior to the 1974 Turkish invasion of Cyprus, Turkish names existed for some villages/towns, due to political reasons, most of the villages/towns were given a different Turkish name. The largest cities in Cyprus, in order from the most populous, are Nicosia (capital), Limassol, Larnaca, Paphos, Famagusta and Kyrenia.

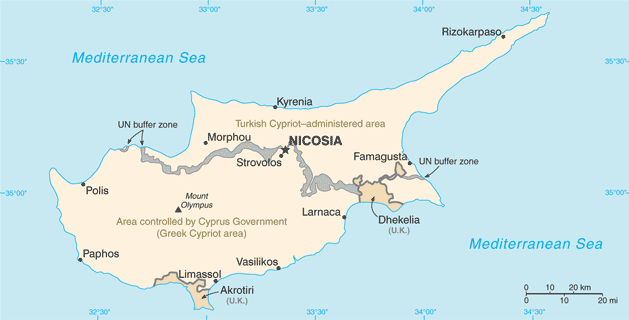
Map of Cyprus

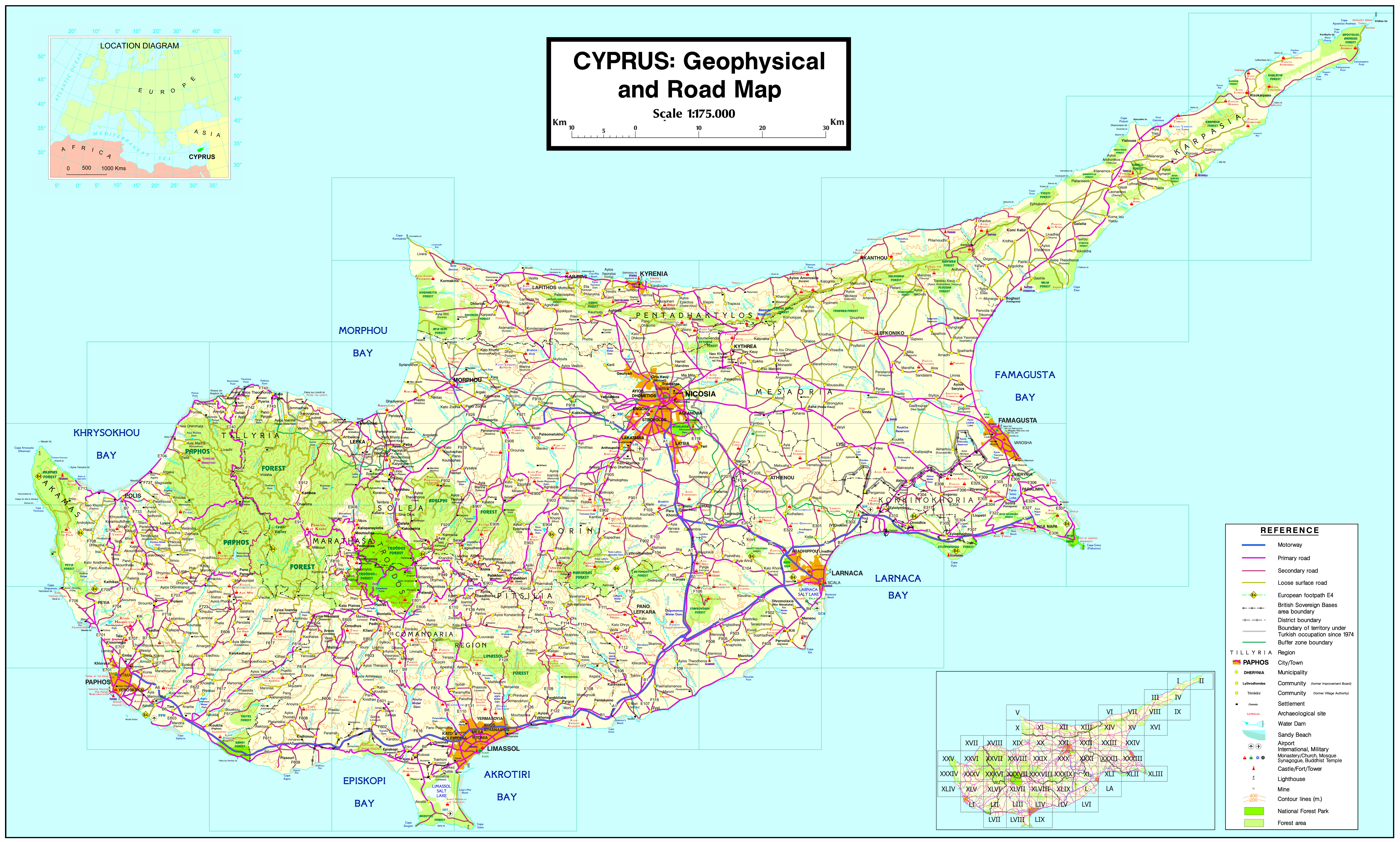
Geophysical and Road Map of Cyprus

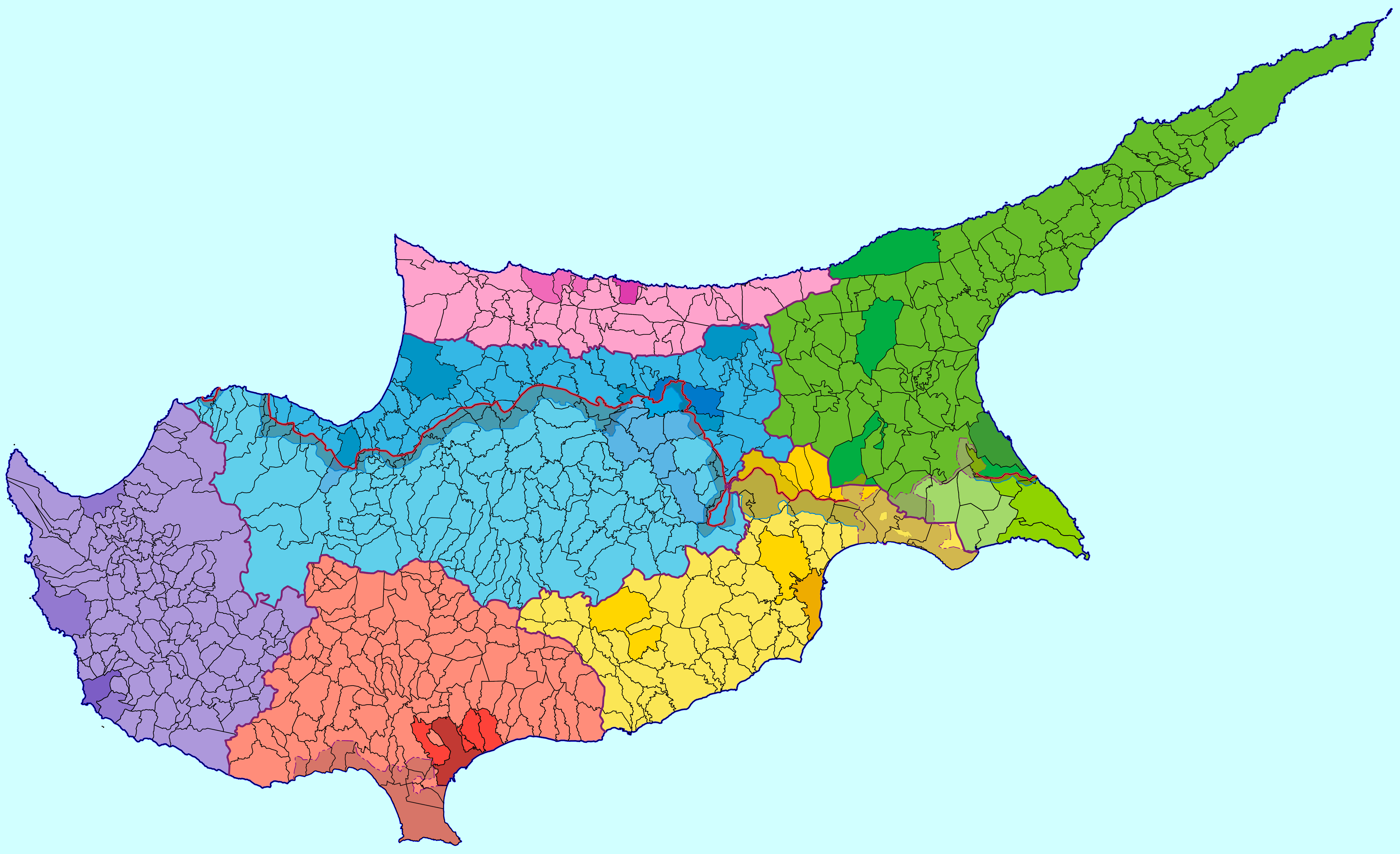
District map of Cyprus

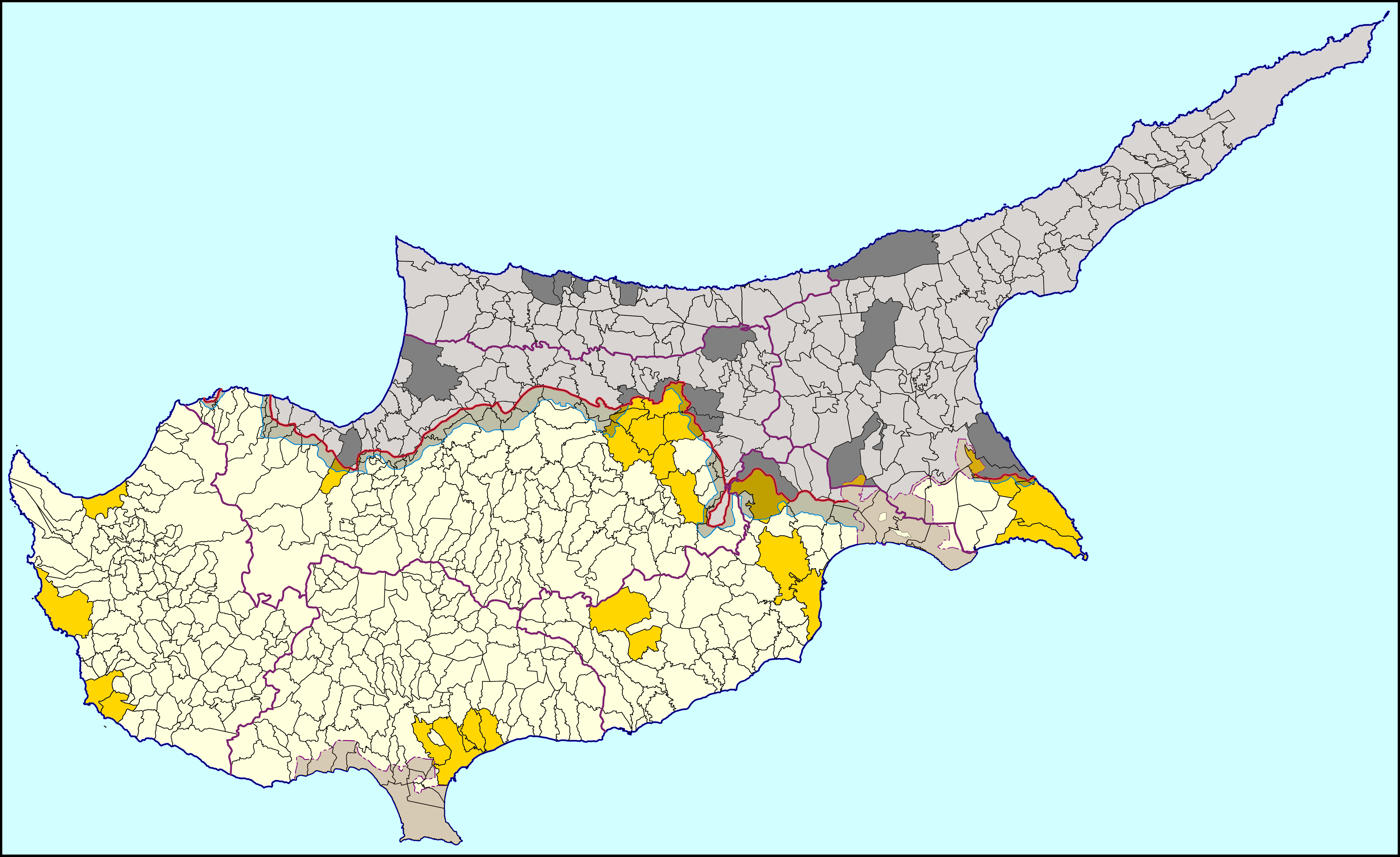
Administrative map of Cyprus

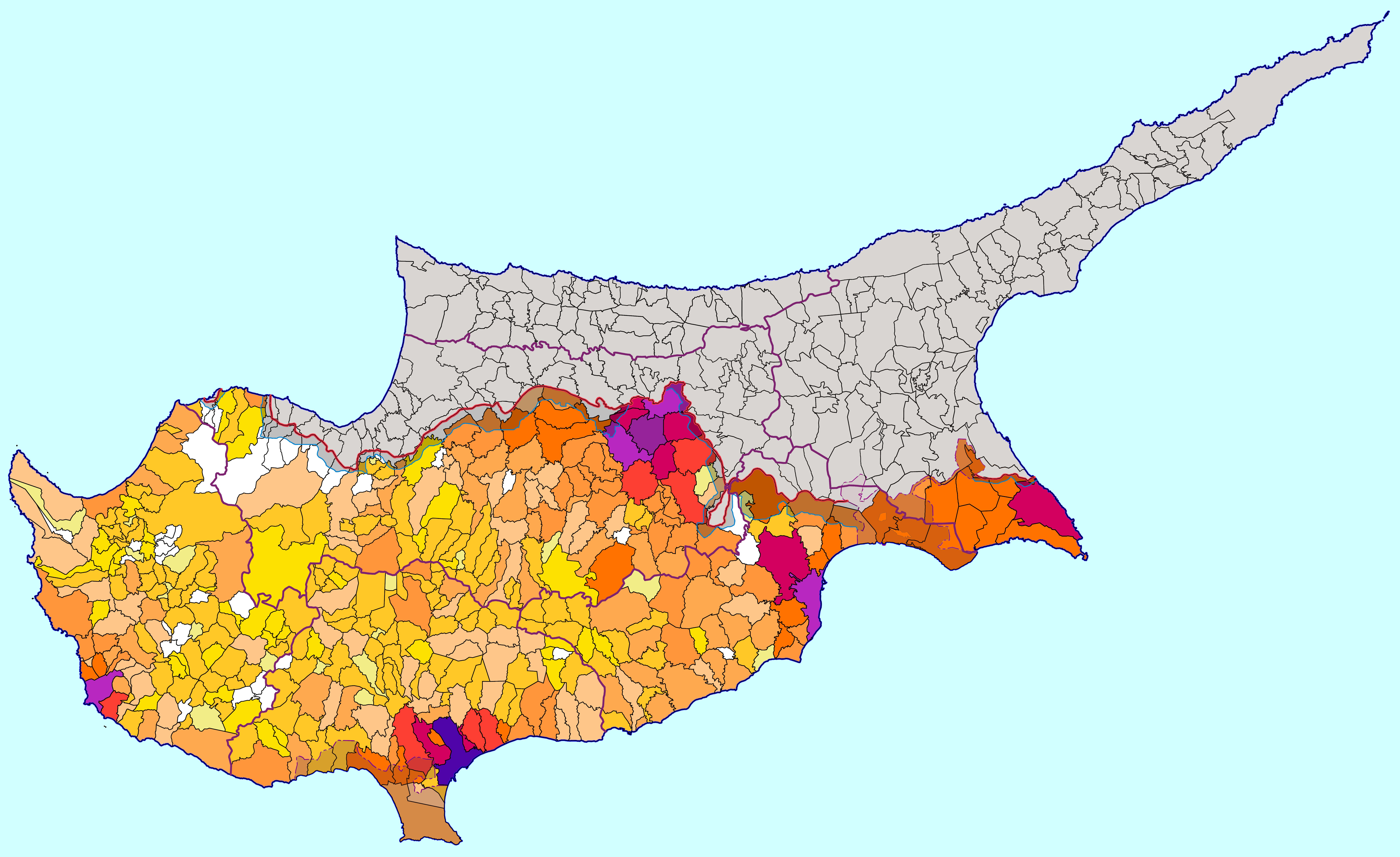
Population map of Cyprus

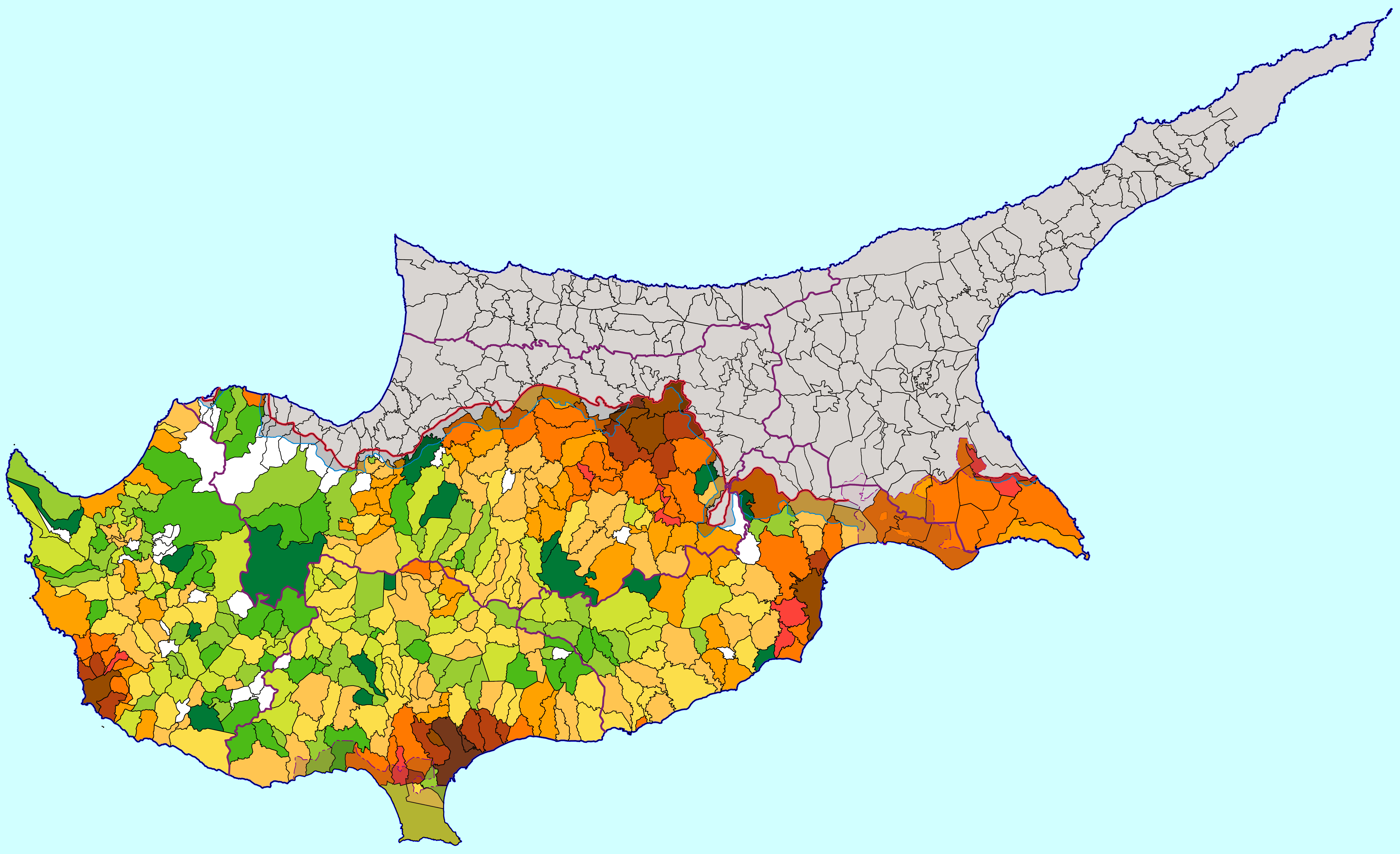
Population density map of Cyprus

== District capital cities ==
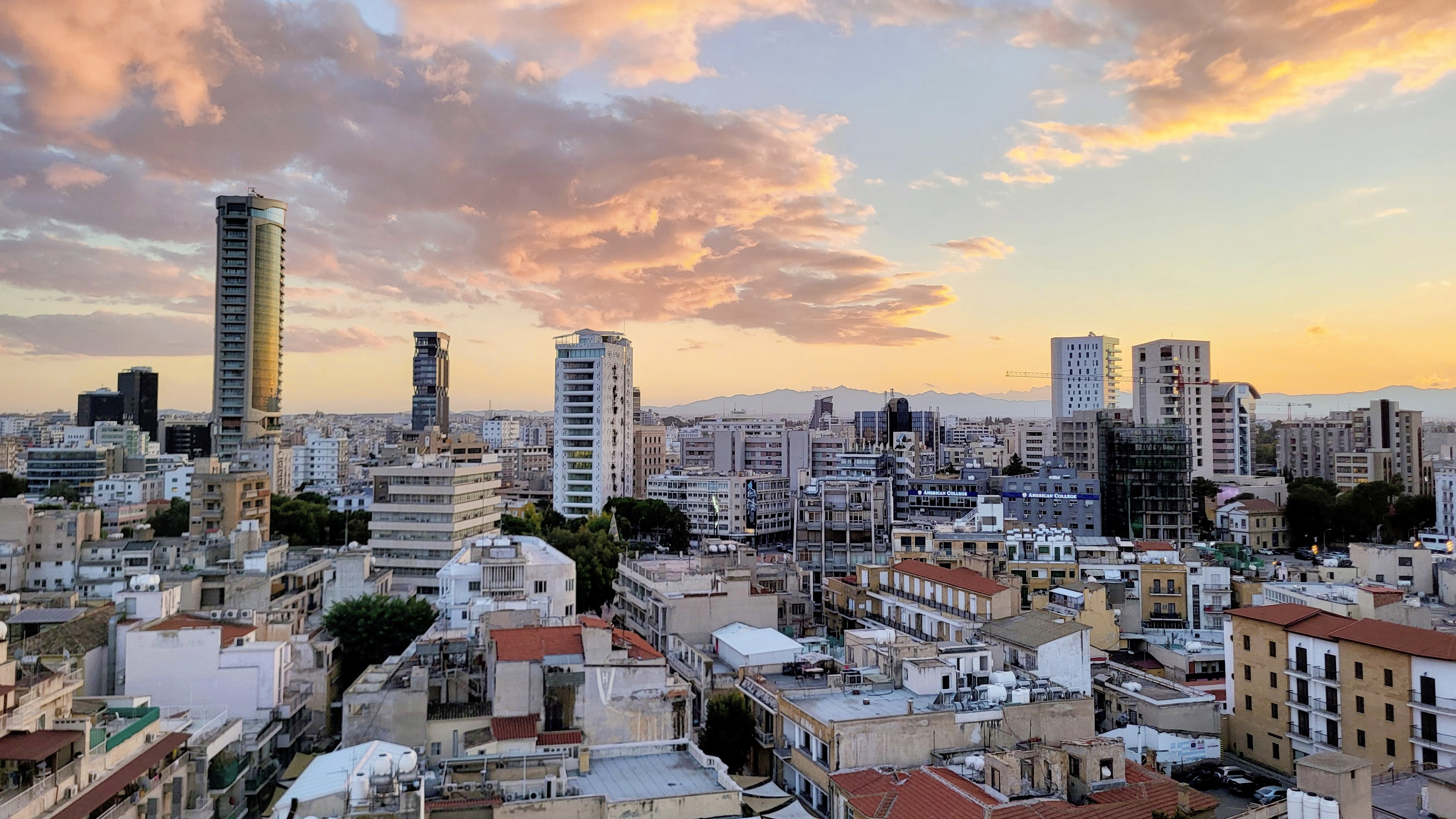
Nicosia, capital city of Cyprus

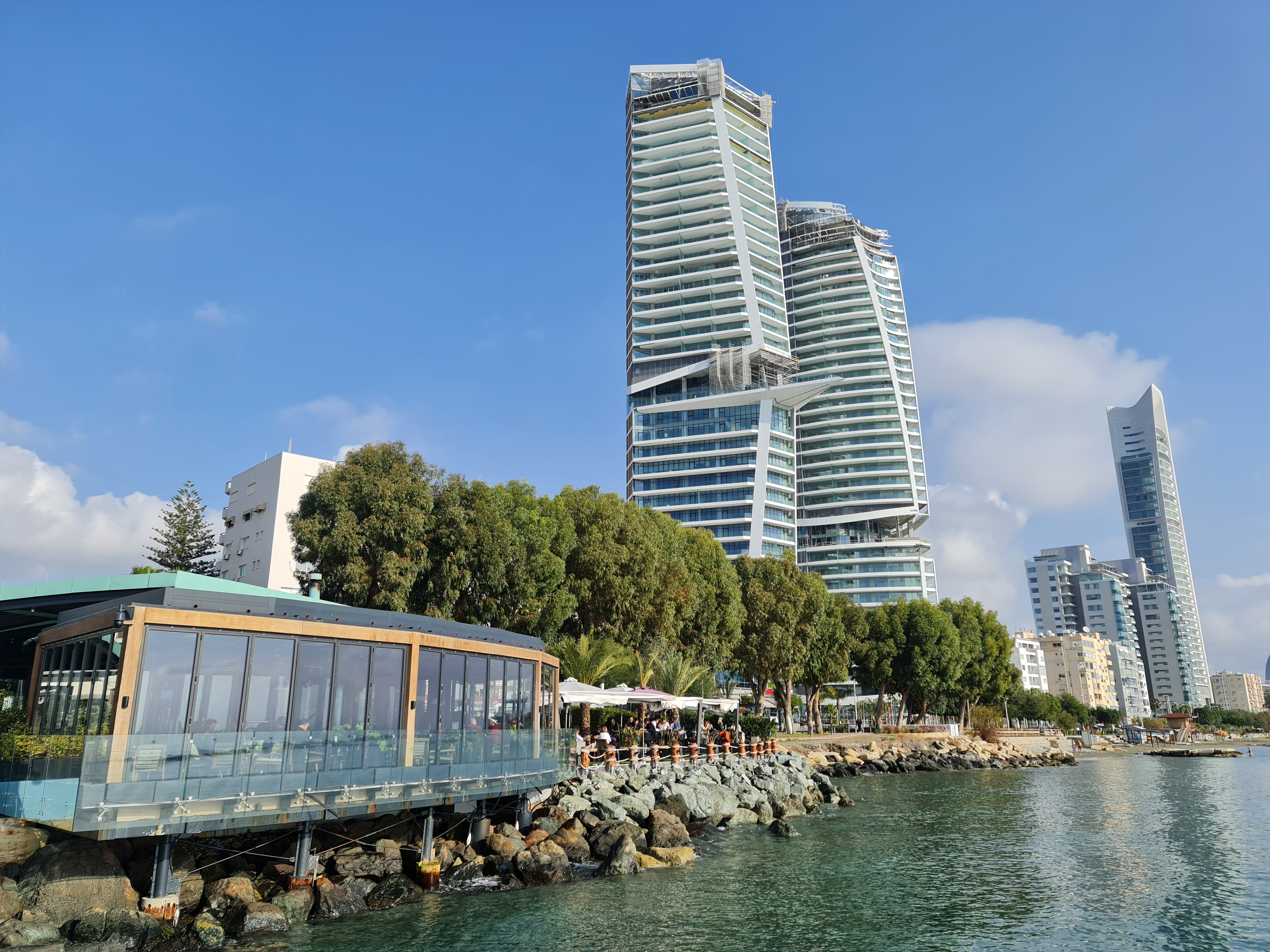
Limassol, 2nd largest urban area

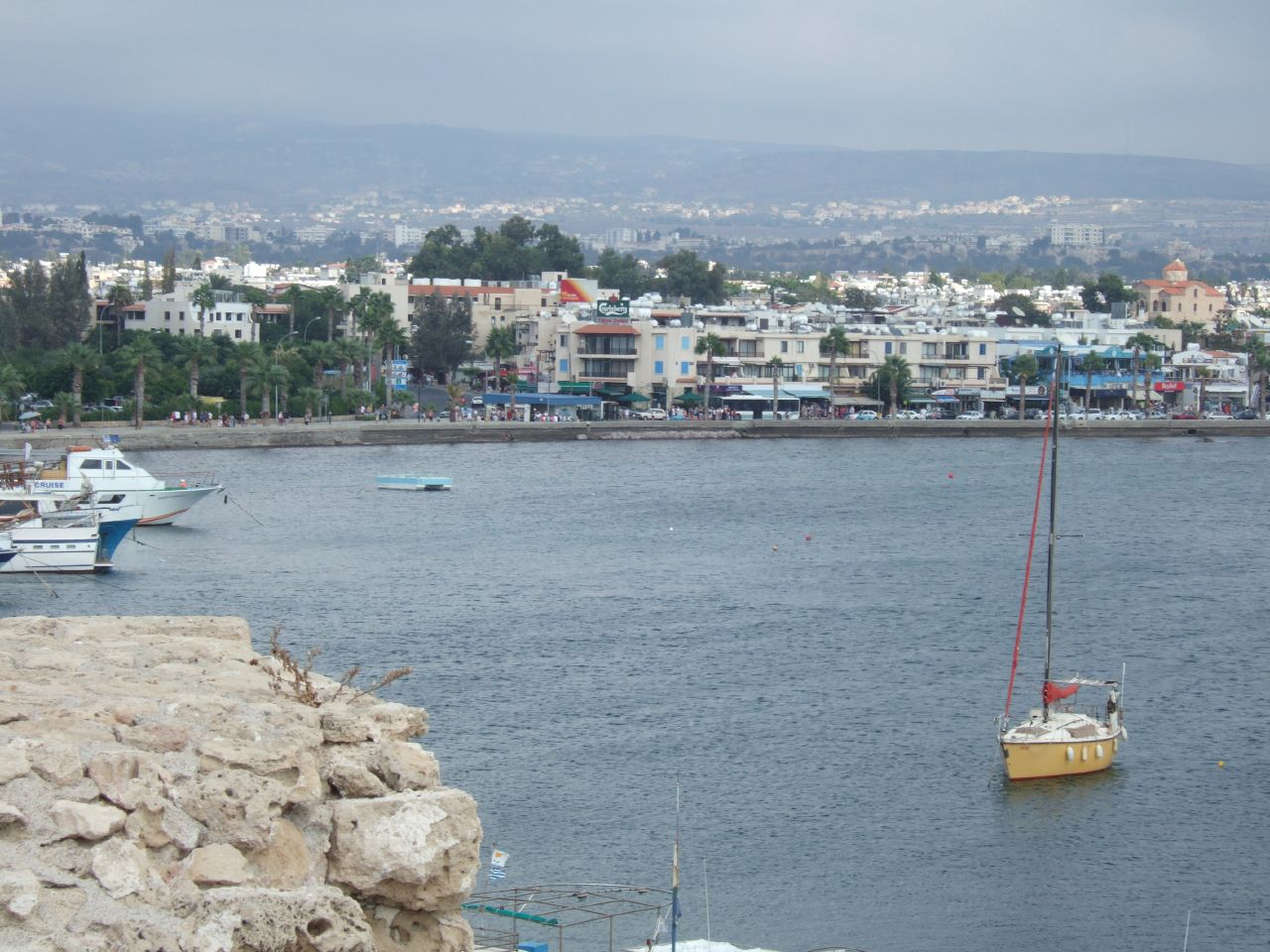
Paphos, 4th largest urban area

District capital cities of Cyprus
| Name (en) | District | Population (urban)(2021) | Area (urban) | Name (gr) | Name (tr) | Other name(s) |
|---|---|---|---|---|---|---|
| Nicosia | Nicosia | 256,119 | 153.11 km^{2} (59.12 sq mi) | Λευκωσία (Lefkosia) | Lefkoşa | |
| Limassol | Limassol | 198,558 | 124.71 km^{2} (48.15 sq mi) | Λεμεσός (Lemesos) | Limasol | Leymosun (ota) |
| Larnaca | Larnaca | 130,000 | 118.62 km^{2} (45.80 sq mi) | Λάρνακα (Larnaka) | Larnaka | Σκάλα (Skala) (gr) İskele (tr); Ancient: Kart Hadasht, Kition |
| Paphos | Paphos | 70,635 | 93.26 km^{2} (36.01 sq mi) | Πάφος (Pafos) | Baf | Κτήμα (Chtima) (gr) Kasaba, Gazibaf, Gazi Baf (tr) |
| Famagusta (Note: Located in illegally occupied territories of the Republic of Cyprus, under the de facto control of the unrecognised Turkish Republic of Northern Cyprus. Population data is from 2011, and area statistics reflect the modern boundaries set by the TRNC, rather than the ones before 1974.) | Famagusta | 40,920 | 85.21 km^{2} (32.90 sq mi) | Αμμόχωστος (Ammochostos) | Mağusa | Gazimağusa (tr) |
| Kyrenia | Kyrenia | 33,207 | 52.59 km^{2} (20.31 sq mi) | Κερύνεια (Keryneia) | Girne | Κηρύνεια (Kiryneia) (gr) Kirine (ota) |

== Municipalities ==
Municipalities of Cyprus
| Name (en) | District | Population (2021) | Area | Name (gr) | Name (tr) |
|---|---|---|---|---|---|
| Kythrea | Nicosia | 3,284 | 31.8 km^{2} (12.3 sq mi) | Κυθρέα | Değirmenlik |
| Lakatameia | Nicosia | 53,105 | | Λακατάμεια | |
| Latsia–Geri | Nicosia | 28,293 | 44.81 km^{2} (17.30 sq mi) | Λατσιά–Γέρι | |
| Morphou | Nicosia | 7,251 | 55.54 km^{2} (21.44 sq mi) | Μόρφου | Güzelyurt / Omorfo |
| Nicosia | Nicosia | 111,433 | | Λευκωσία | Lefkoşa |
| South Nicosia–Idalion | Nicosia | 22,637 | | Νότια Λευκωσία–Ιδάλιο | Güney Lefkoşa - Dali |
| Strovolos | Nicosia | 70,823 | 25.29 km2 (9.76 sq mi) | Στρόβολος | |
| Amathounta | Limassol | 42,976 | | Αμαθούντα | |
| Kourion | Limassol | 34,729 | | Κούριο | Kurion |
| Limassol | Limassol | 123,947 | | Λεμεσός | Limasol |
| Polemidia | Limassol | 26,593 | | Πολεμίδια | |
| Aradippou | Larnaca | 24,510 | | Αραδίππου | |
| Athienou | Larnaca | 5,467 | | Αθηένου | |
| Dromolaxia–Meneou | Larnaca | 17,026 | | Δρομολαξιά–Μενεού | |
| Larnaca | Larnaca | 68,202 | | Λάρνακα | Larnaka |
| Lefkara | Larnaca | 3,605 | | Λεύκαρα | |
| Agia Napa | Famagusta | 22,636 | | Αγία Νάπα | Aya Napa |
| Akanthou | Famagusta | 1,120 | | Ακανθού | Tatlısu / Akatu |
| Famagusta | Famagusta | 37,868 | 37.72 km^{2} (14.56 sq mi) | Αμμόχωστος | Gazimağusa |
| Lefkoniko | Famagusta | 1,253 | 53.96 km^{2} (20.83 sq mi) | Λευκόνοικο | Geçitkale / Lefkonuk |
| Lysi | Famagusta | 2,471 | 40.30 km^{2} (15.56 sq mi) | Λύση | Akdoğan |
| Paralimni–Deryneia | Famagusta | 19,035 | 50.0 km^{2} (19.3 sq mi) | Παραλίμνι–Δερύνεια | |
| Akamas | Paphos | 10,162 | | Ακάμας | |
| Ierokipia | Paphos | 12,958 | | Ιεροκηπία | |
| Paphos | Paphos | 37,991 | 16.95 km^{2} (6.54 sq mi) | Πάφος | Baf |
| Polis Chrysochous | Paphos | 6,278 | | Πόλις Χρυσοχού | |
| Karavas | Kyrenia | 6,597 | 22.16 km^{2} (8.56 sq mi) | Καραβάς | Alsancak |
| Kyrenia | Kyrenia | 22,148 | 10.47 km^{2} (4.04 sq mi) | Κερύνεια | Girne |
| Lapithos | Kyrenia | 5,748 | 18.26 km^{2} (7.05 sq mi) | Λάπηθος | Lapta |

== Minor towns and villages ==
Minor towns and villages in Cyprus (Note: Some Turkish names were modified after the 1974 Turkish invasion.)
| Name (en) | District | Name (gr) | Name (tr) |
|---|---|---|---|
| Acheleia | Paphos | Αχέλεια | Aşelya |
| Achna | Famagusta | Άχνα | Düzce / Ahna |
| Agia Marina | Nicosia | Αγία Μαρίνα | Aymarina |
| Agia Marinouda | Paphos | Αγία Μαρινούδα | Ayarinuda |
| Agia Trias (Note: Located in illegally occupied territories of the Republic of Cyprus, under the de facto control of the unrecognised Turkish Republic of Northern Cyprus.) | Famagusta | Αγία Τριάς | Sipahi |
| Agia Varvara | Paphos | Αγία Βαρβάρα | Engindere |
| Agioi Trimithias | Nicosia | Αγίοι Τριμιθιάς | Aytrimitya |
| Agios Amvrosios | Kyrenia | Άγιος Αμβρόσιος | Esentepe |
| Agios Amvrosios | Limassol | Άγιος Αμβρόσιος | Ayavroz |
| Agios Dimitrios | Limassol | Άγιος Δημήτριος | Aydimitri |
| Agios Georgios | Limassol | Άγιος Γεώργιος | Ayyorgi |
| Agios Ioannis | Limassol | Άγιος Ιωάννης | Ayyanni |
| Agios Konstantinos | Limassol | Άγιος Κωνσταντίνος | Aykonstantin |
| Agios Mamas | Limassol | Άγιος Μάμας | Aymama |
| Agios Pavlos | Limassol | Άγιος Παύλος | Aybavlo |
| Agios Sozomenos | Nicosia | Άγιος Σωζόμενος | Arpalık |
| Agios Theodoros | Limassol | Άγίος Θεοδώρος | Aytotoro |
| Agios Thomas | Limassol | Άγιος Θωμάς | Aytoma |
| Agios Tychonas | Limassol | Άγιος Τύχωνας | Aytihon |
| Agridia | Limassol | Αγρίδια | Agridya |
| Agros | Limassol | Αγρός | Ağro |
| Akaki | Nicosia | Ακάκι / Ακάτζι | Akaça |
| Akrotiri | Sovereign Base Area | Ακρωτήρι | Ağrotur |
| Amargeti | Paphos | Αμαργέτη | Gelgit / Amarkit |
| Amathous | Limassol | Αμαθούς | Amatu |
| Anagyia | Nicosia | Ανάγυια / Ανάγεια | |
| Anarita | Paphos | Αναρίτα | Anarida |
| Anthoupolis | Nicosia | Ανθούπολη | |
| Apostolos Andreas | Famagusta | Απόστολος Ανδρέας | Ayandreya Manastırı |
| Argaki | Nicosia | Αργάκι | Akçay |
| Arminou | Paphos | Αρμινου | Ermino |
| Asinou | Nicosia | Ασίνου | Asinu |
| Askas | Nicosia | Ασκάς | Aska |
| Assia | Famagusta | Άσσια | Paşaköy / Aşa |
| Astromeritis | Nicosia | Αστρομερίτης | Astromerit |
| Bellapais | Kyrenia | Μπελλαπάις | Beylerbeyi / Bellabayıs |
| Buffavento | Kyrenia | Βουφαβέντο | Bufavento |
| Chandria | Limassol | Χανδριά | Handria |
| Chirokitia | Larnaca | Χοιροκοιτία | Şirokitya / Hirokitya |
| Chloraka | Paphos | Χλώρακα | Hiloraka |
| Choletria | Paphos | Χολέτρια | Holetra |
| Dasaki tis Achnas | Famagusta | Δασάκι της Άχνας | Ahna Ormanı |
| Dhekelia | Sovereign Base Area | Δεκέλεια | Dikelya |
| Dhrousha | Paphos | Δρούσια | Diruşe |
| Dora | Limassol | Δορά | Dora |
| Doros | Limassol | Δωρός | Doro |
| Dymes | Limassol | Δύμες | Dimez |
| Episkopi | Limassol | Επισκοπή | Yalova / Piskobu |
| Ergates | Nicosia | Εργάτες | Arkades |
| Evrychou | Nicosia | Ευρύχου | Evrihu |
| Foinikas | Paphos | Φοίνικας | Finike |
| Fyti | Paphos | Φυτη | Fidi |
| Galata | Nicosia | Γαλάτα | Galata |
| Gerakies | Nicosia | Γερακιές | Yeracez |
| Gerolakkos | Nicosia | Γερόλακκος | Alayköy |
| Gialousa | Famagusta | Γιαλούσα | Yeni Erenköy / Maltepe |
| Giolou | Paphos | Γιoλού | Yolu |
| Idalium | Nicosia | Ιδάλιον | İdalyon |
| Inia | Paphos | Ίνια | İnya |
| Kaimakli | Nicosia | Καϊμακλί | Büyük Kaymaklı |
| Kakopetria | Nicosia | Κακοπετριά | Gagobedriya |
| Kalavasos | Larnaca | Καλαβασός | Kalavason |
| Kalo Chorio | Nicosia | Καλό Χωριό Λεύκα | Çamlıköy |
| Kalopanagiotis | Nicosia | Καλοπαναγιώτης | Galabanayot |
| Kampia | Nicosia | Καμπιά | Kambiye |
| Kampos | Nicosia | Κάμπος | Gambo |
| Kantou | Limassol | Καντού | Çanakkale / Kandu |
| Kapedes | Nicosia | Καπέδες | Kapedez |
| Kato Deftera | Nicosia | Κάτω Δευτερά | Kato Deftera |
| Kato Lefkara | Larnaca | Κάτω Λέυκαρα | Aşağı Lefkara |
| Kato Zodeia | Nicosia | Κάτω Ζώδια | Aşağı Bostancı / Zodya |
| Kellia | Larnaca | Κελιά | Yıldırım / Celya |
| Kelokedara | Paphos | Κελοκέδαρα | Celocedra |
| Kissonerga | Paphos | Κισσόνεργα | Cissonerga |
| Kiti | Larnaca | Κίτι | Çite |
| Kofinou | Larnaca | Κοφίνου | Geçitkale / Köfünye |
| Koilani | Limassol | Κοιλάνι | Ceylan / Gilan |
| Kokkina | Nicosia | Κόκκινα | Erenköy / Koççina |
| Kormakitis | Kyrenia | Κορμακίτης | Koruçam / Kormacit |
| Kornokipos | Famagusta | Κορνόκηπος | Görneç |
| Kornos | Larnaca | Κόρνος | Korno |
| Kouklia | Paphos | Κούκλια | Köprülü / Kukla |
| Kyperounta | Limassol | Κυπερούντα | Ciberunda |
| Lagoudera | Nicosia | Λαγουδερά | Lagudera |
| Lambousa | Kyrenia | Λαμπούσα | Lambusa |
| Lefka | Nicosia | Λεύκα | Lefke |
| Leonarisso | Famagusta | Λεονάρισσο | Ziyamet |
| Limnia | Famagusta | Λιμνιά | Mormenekşe |
| Louroujina | Nicosia | Λουρουτζίνα | Akıncılar / Lurucina / Luricina |
| Lythrangomi | Famagusta | Λυθράγκωμη | Boltaşlı |
| Lythrodontas | Nicosia | Λυθροδόντας | Litirudondaz |
| Malounta | Nicosia | Μαλούντα | Malunta |
| Mammari | Nicosia | Μάμμαρι | Mamari |
| Mandria | Limassol | Μανδριά | Mandirga |
| Mandria | Paphos | Μανδριά | Yeşilova |
| Margo | Nicosia | Μαργό | Margo |
| Maroni | Larnaca | Μαρώνι | Maroni |
| Mathiatis | Nicosia | Μαθιάτης | Matyat |
| Melini | Larnaca | Μελίνη | Melini |
| Meneou | Larnaca | Μενεού | |
| Meniko | Nicosia | Μένικο | Meniko |
| Mesana | Paphos | Μέσανα | Mesana |
| Mia Milia | Nicosia | Μιά Μηλιά | Haspolat |
| Miliav | Famagusta | Μηλιά | Yıldırım / Milya |
| Miliou | Paphos | Μηλιου | Melyu |
| Moutoullas | Nicosia | Μουτουλλάς | Mudulla |
| Mylikouri | Nicosia | Μιλικούρι | Milikuri |
| Nata | Paphos | Nατά | Nate |
| Oikos | Nicosia | Οίκος | İkos |
| Omorphita | Nicosia | Oμορφίτα | Küçük Kaymaklı |
| Ormideia | Larnaca | Ορμήδεια | Ormidya |
| Oroklini | Larnaca | Ορόκλινη | Oroklini |
| Orounta | Nicosia | Ορούντα | Orunda |
| Pachna | Limassol | Πάχνα | Bahne |
| Palaichori Morphou | Nicosia | Παλαιχώρι Μόρφου | Palaşori / Balahor |
| Palaichori Oreinis | Nicosia | Παλαιχώρι Ορεινής | Palaşori / Balahor |
| Palodeia | Limassol | Παλόδεια | Balodya |
| Panagia | Paphos | Παναγιά | Banaya |
| Pano Deftera | Nicosia | Πάνω Δευτερά | Pano Deftera |
| Pano Zodeia | Nicosia | Πάνω Ζώδια | Yukarı Bostancı / Zodya |
| Pedoulas | Nicosia | Πεδουλάς | Pedule |
| Pera Chorio | Nicosia | Πέρα Χωριό | Perahoryo |
| Pera Orinis | Nicosia | Πέρα Ορεινής | Pera |
| Pera Pedi | Limassol | Πέρα Πεδί | Parapedi |
| Peristerona | Nicosia | Περιστερώνα | Peristerona |
| Peristeronopigi | Famagusta | Περιστερωνοπηγή | Alaniçi / Piperisterona |
| Pissouri | Limassol | Πισσούρι | Pisuri |
| Platanistasa | Nicosia | Πλατανιστάσα | Bladanistasa |
| Platres | Limassol | Πλάτρες | Yukarı Platres |
| Polis | Paphos | Πόλις | Poli |
| Politiko | Nicosia | Πολιτικό | Politigo |
| Polystypos | Nicosia | Πολύστυπος | Bolistibo |
| Pomos | Paphos | Πωμός | Pomo |
| Potamos tou Kampou | Nicosia | Ποταμός του Κάμπου | Yedidalga |
| Protaras | Famagusta | Πρωταράς | Protaras |
| Psimolofou | Nicosia | Ψιμολόφου | İbsomolof |
| Pyla | Larnaca | Πύλα | Pile |
| Pyrgos | Limassol | Πύργος | Pirgo |
| Rizokarpaso | Famagusta | Ριζοκάρπασο | Dipkarpaz |
| Silikou | Limassol | Σιλίκου | Silifke / Siliçi |
| Sotira | Limassol | Σωτήρα Λεμεσού | Sotira |
| Templos | Kyrenia | Τέμπλος | Zeytinlik / Temroz |
| Trikomo | Famagusta | Τρίκωμο | İskele / Yeni İskele |
| Troulloi | Larnaca | Τρούλλοι | Trulli |
| Tsakistra | Nicosia | Τσακίστρα | Çakistra |
| Tymbou | Nicosia | Τύμπου | Kırklar / Ercan / Dimbo |
| Varosha | Famagusta | Βαρώσια | Maraş |
| Vasilikos | Larnaca | Βασιλικός | Vasiliko |
| Vavla | Larnaca | Βαβλα | Vavla |
| Vikla | Limassol | Βίκλα | Vikla |
| Vouni | Limassol | Βουνί | Vuni |
| Vretsia | Paphos | Βρέτσια | Dağaşan / Vretça / Vreçça / Evreçe |
| Vrysoulles | Famagusta | Βρυσούλες | Vrisulles |
| Xeros | Limassol | Ξερός | Denizli |
| Xylofagou | Larnaca | Ξυλοφάγου | Silofagu |
| Xylotymbou | Larnaca | Ξυλοτύμπου | İksilotimbu |
| Zoopigi | Limassol | Ζωοπηγή | Zoopigi |
| Zygi | Larnaca | Ζύγι | Terazi / Ziyi |

== Settlements in Northern Cyprus ==
=== District capital cities ===
Note that not all North Cyprus District capital cities are also District capital cities of the Republic of Cyprus.

District capital cities in Northern Cyprus
| Name (en) | District (de facto) (tr) | District (de jure) (en) | Population (urban)(2011) | Area (urban) | Name (gr) | Name (tr) |
|---|---|---|---|---|---|---|
| Famagusta (Note: De jure district capital city and Municipality of the Republic of Cyprus.) | Gazimağusa | Famagusta | 40,920 | 85.21 km^{2} (32.90 sq mi) | Αμμόχωστος | Gazimağusa |
| Kyrenia | Girne | Kyrenia | 33,207 | 52.59 km^{2} (20.31 sq mi) | Κερύνεια | Girne |
| Morphou (Note: De jure Municipality of the Republic of Cyprus.) | Güzelyurt | Nicosia | 18,946 | 206.1 km^{2} (79.6 sq mi) | Μόρφου | Güzelyurt |
| Trikomo | İskele | Famagusta | 7,906 | 223.3 km^{2} (86.2 sq mi) | Τρίκωμο | İskele |
| Lefka | Lefke | Nicosia | 11,091 | 125.8 km^{2} (48.6 sq mi) | Λεύκα | Lefke |
| North Nicosia | Lefkoşa | Nicosia | 82,929 | 165.6 km^{2} (63.9 sq mi) | Βόρεια Λευκωσία | Kuzey Lefkoşa |

=== Municipalities ===
Municipalities are under the de facto control of the Turkish Republic of Northern Cyprus. Turkish names were established in 1958, then some of them were altered after the Turkish invasion (e.g. Morphou in Nicosia District). Note that not all North Cyprus Municipalities are also Municipalities of the Republic of Cyprus.

Municipalities in Northern Cyprus
| Name (en) | District (de facto) (tr) | District (de jure) (en) | Population (2011) | Area | Name (gr) | Name (tr) |
|---|---|---|---|---|---|---|
| Gerolakkos | Lefkoşa | Nicosia | 3,884 | 101.8 km^{2} (39.3 sq mi) | Γερόλακκος | Alayköy |
| Gönyeli | Lefkoşa | Nicosia | 17,277 | 32.37 km^{2} (12.50 sq mi) | Κιόνελι | Gönyeli |
| Kythrea | Lefkoşa | Nicosia | 11,895 | 313.5 km^{2} (121.0 sq mi) | Κυθρέα | Değirmenlik |
| Louroujina | Lefkoşa | Nicosia | 390 | 9.190 km^{2} (3.548 sq mi) | Λουρουτζίνα | Akıncılar |
| North Nicosia | Lefkoşa | Nicosia | 61,378 | 86.90 km^{2} (33.55 sq mi) | Βόρεια Λευκωσία | Kuzey Lefkoşa |
| Agios Sergios | Gazimağusa | Famagusta | 6,618 | 127.2 km^{2} (49.1 sq mi) | Άγιος Σέργιος | Yeni Boğaziçi |
| Akanthou | Gazimağusa | Famagusta | 1,120 | 85.21 km^{2} (32.90 sq mi) | Ακανθού | Tatlısu |
| Assia | Gazimağusa | Famagusta | 3,561 | 85.60 km^{2} (33.05 sq mi) | Άσσια | Paşaköy |
| Famagusta | Gazimağusa | Famagusta | 37,868 | 37.72 km^{2} (14.56 sq mi) | Αμμόχωστος | Gazimağusa |
| Lefkoniko | Gazimağusa | Famagusta | 1,253 | 53.96 km^{2} (20.83 sq mi) | Λευκόνοικο | Geçitkale |
| Lysi | Gazimağusa | Famagusta | 2,471 | 40.30 km^{2} (15.56 sq mi) | Λύση | Akdoğan |
| Pergamos | Gazimağusa | Famagusta | 4,125 | 132.1 km^{2} (51.0 sq mi) | Πέργαμoς | Beyarmudu |
| Sinta | Gazimağusa | Famagusta | 2,927 | 68.19 km^{2} (26.33 sq mi) | Σίντα | İnönü |
| Chatos | Gazimağusa | Famagusta | 2,411 | 98.52 km^{2} (38.04 sq mi) | Κιάδος | Serdarlı |
| Vatili | Gazimağusa | Famagusta | 2,390 | 41.99 km^{2} (16.21 sq mi) | Βατυλή | Vadili |
| Agios Amvrosios | Girne | Kyrenia | 2,414 | 90.50 km^{2} (34.94 sq mi) | Άγιος Αμβρόσιος | Esentepe |
| Agios Epiktitos | Girne | Kyrenia | 5,652 | 42.23 km^{2} (16.31 sq mi) | Άγιος Επίκτητος | Çatalköy |
| Dikomo | Girne | Kyrenia | 9,120 | 153.4 km^{2} (59.2 sq mi) | Δίκωμο | Dikmen |
| Karavas | Girne | Kyrenia | 6,597 | 22.16 km^{2} (8.56 sq mi) | Καραβάς | Alsancak |
| Kyrenia | Girne | Kyrenia | 22,148 | 10.47 km^{2} (4.04 sq mi) | Κερύνεια | Girne |
| Lapithos | Girne | Kyrenia | 5,748 | 18.26 km^{2} (7.05 sq mi) | Λάπηθος | Lapta |
| Morphou (Morfu) | Güzelyurt | Nicosia | 7,251 | 55.54 km^{2} (21.44 sq mi) | Μόρφου | Güzelyurt |
| Galatia | İskele | Famagusta | 3,729 | 109.8 km^{2} (42.4 sq mi) | Γαλάτεια | Mehmetçik |
| Komi Kebir | İskele | Famagusta | 2,860 | 145.1 km^{2} (56.0 sq mi) | Κώμη Κεπήρ | Büyükkonuk |
| Rizokarpaso | İskele | Famagusta | 2,349 | 153.5 km^{2} (59.3 sq mi) | Ριζοκάρπασο | Dipkarpaz |
| Trikomo | İskele | Famagusta | 3,058 | 40.98 km^{2} (15.82 sq mi) | Τρίκωμο | Yeni İskele |
| Yialousa | İskele | Famagusta | 5,627 | 179.5 km^{2} (69.3 sq mi) | Γιαλούσα | Yeni Erenköy |
| Lefka | Lefke | Nicosia | 3,009 | 15.95 km^{2} (6.16 sq mi) | Λεύκα | Lefke |

=== Minor towns and villages ===
Towns and villages, illegally occupied since the 1974 Turkish invasion and sub-sequentially under the de facto control of the Turkish Republic of Northern Cyprus. Turkish names were established in 1958, then some of them were altered after the Turkish invasion (e.g. Kourou Monastiri in Nicosia District).

==== Famagusta District ====
Minor towns and villages in the Occupied Famagusta District
| Name (en) | Name (gr) | Name (tr) |
|---|---|---|
| Acheritou | Αχερίτου | Güvercinlik |
| Achna | Άχνα | Düzce / Ahna |
| Afania | Αφάνεια | Gaziköy |
| Agia Trias | Αγία Τριάδα | Sipahi |
| Agion Andronikoudi | Άγιος Ανδρόνικος | Topçuköy |
| Agios Andronikos | Άγιος Ανδρόνικος | Yeşilköy |
| Agios Chariton | Άγιος Χαρίτων | Ergenekon |
| Agios Efstathios | Άγιος Ευστάθιος | Zeybekköy |
| Agios Georgios | Άγιος Γεώργιος | Aygün |
| Agios Iakovos | Αγιος Ιάκωβος | Altınova |
| Agios Ilias | Άγιος Ηλίας | Yarköy |
| Agios Nikolaos | Άγιος Νικόλαος | Yamaçköy |
| Agios Sergios | Άγιος Σέργιος | Yeniboğaziçi / Yeni Boğaziçi |
| Agios Symeon | Άγιος Συμεών | Avtepe |
| Agios Theodoros | Άγιος Θεόδωρος | Çayırova |
| Akanthou (Note: Municipality located in illegally occupied territories of the Republic of Cyprus, under the de facto control of the unregonised Turkish Republic of Northern Cyprus.) | Ακανθού | Tatlısu / Akatu |
| Aloda | Αλόδα | Atlılar |
| Apostolos Andreas | Απόστολος Ανδρέας | Ayandreya Manastırı |
| Angastina | Αγκαστίνα | Aslanköy |
| Ardana | Άρδανα | Ardahan |
| Arnadi | Αρναδί | Kuzucuk |
| Artemi | Αρτέμι | Arıdamı |
| Assia | Άσσια | Paşaköy / Aşa |
| Avgolida | Αυγολίδα | Kurtuluş |
| Bogazi | Μπογάζι | Boğaz |
| Davlos | Δαυλός | Kaplıca |
| Enkomi | Έγκωμη | Tuzla |
| Eptakomi | Επτακώμη | Yedikonuk |
| Famagusta | Αμμόχωστος | Mağusa/Gazimağusa |
| Flamoudi | Φλαμούδι | Mersinlik |
| Gaidouras | Γαϊδουράς | Korkuteli |
| Galatia | Γαλάτεια | Mehmetçik |
| Galinoporni | Γαληνόπορνη | Kaleburnu |
| Gastria | Γαστριά | Kelecik |
| Genagra | Γέναγρα | Nergizli |
| Gerani | Γεράνι | Turnalar |
| Gialousa | Γιαλούσα | Yeni Erenköy / Maltepe |
| Goufes | Γούφες | Çamlıca |
| Gypsou | Γύψου | Akova |
| Kalopsida | Καλοψίδα | Çayönü |
| Karpasia | Καρπασία | Karpaşa / Kırpaşa / Karpaz |
| Kiados | Κιάδος | Serdarlı |
| Kilanemos | Κοιλάνεμος | Esenköy |
| Knodara | Κνώδαρα | Gönendere |
| Koma tou Gialou | Κώμα του Γιαλού | Kumyalı |
| Komi Kepir | Κώμη Κεπήρ | Büyükkonuk |
| Kontea | Κοντέα | Türkmenköy |
| Kornokipos | Κορνόκηπος | Görneç |
| Korovia | Κορόβεια | Kuruova |
| Kouklia | Κούκλια | Köprülü |
| Kridia | Κρίδεια | Kilitkaya |
| Lapathos | Λάπαθος | Sınırüstü / Boğaziçi |
| Lefkoniko | Λευκόνοικο | Lefkonuk / Geçitkale |
| Leonarisso | Λεονάρισσο | Ziyamet |
| Limnia | Λιμνιά | Mormenekşe |
| Livadia | Λιβάδια | Sazlıköy |
| Lysi | Λύση | Akdoğan / Lisi |
| Lythragkomi | Λυθράγκωμη | Boltaşlı |
| Makrasyka | Μακράσυκα | İncirli |
| Mandres | Μάντρες | Ağıllar |
| Maratha | Μαράθα | Muratağa |
| Marathovounos | Μαραθόβουνος | Ulukışla |
| Melanarga | Μελάναγρα | Adaçay |
| Melounta | Μελούντα | Mallıdağ |
| Milia | Μηλιά | Yıldırım / Milya |
| Monarga | Μoναργά | Boğaztepe |
| Mousoulita | Μουσουλίτα | Kurudere |
| Neta | Νέτα | Taşlıca |
| Ovgoros | Όβγορος | Ergazi |
| Patriki | Πατρίκι | Tuzluca |
| Peristerona | Περιστερώνα | Alaniçi |
| Peristeronopigi | Περιστερωνοπηγή | Alaniçi / Piperisterona |
| Perivolia tou Trikomou | Περιβόλια του Τρικόμου | Bahçeler / Bahçalar |
| Platani | Πλατάνι | Çınarlı |
| Platanissos | Πλατανισσός | Balalan |
| Prastio | Πραστειό | Dörtyol |
| Psyllatos | Ψυλλάτος | Sütlüce |
| Pyrga | Πυργά | Pirhan |
| Rizokarpaso | Ριζοκάρπασο | Dipkarpaz |
| Santalaris | Σανταλάρης | Sandallar / Şehitler |
| Sinta | Σίντα | İnönü / Sinde |
| Spathariko | Σπαθαρικό | Ötüken |
| Strongylos | Στρογγυλός | Turunçlu |
| Stylli | Στύλλοι | Mutluyaka |
| Tavros | Ταύρος | Pamuklu |
| Trikomo | Τρίκωμο | İskele / Yeni İskele |
| Trypimeni | Τρυπημένη | Tirmen |
| Vasili | Βασίλι | Gelincik |
| Vatili | Βατυλή | Vadili |
| Vathylakas | Βαθύλακας | Derince |
| Vitsada | Βιτσάδα | Pınarlı |
| Vokolida | Βοκολίδα | Bafra |

==== Kyrenia District ====
Minor towns and villages in the Occupied Kyrenia District
| Name (en) | Name (gr) | Name (tr) |
|---|---|---|
| Agia Irini | Αγία Ειρήνη | Akdeniz |
| Agios Amvrosios | Άγιος Αμβρόσιος | Esentepe |
| Agios Epiktitos | Άγιος Επίκτητος | Çatalköy |
| Agios Ermolaos | Άγιος Ερμόλαος | Şirinevler |
| Agios Georgios | Άγιος Γεώργιος | Karaoğlanoğlu |
| Agirda | Αγύρτα | Ağırdağ |
| Agridaki | Αγριδάκι | Alemdağ |
| Asomatos | Ασώματος | Özhan |
| Bellapais | Μπελλαπάις | Beylerbeyi / Bellabayıs |
| Buffavento | Βουφαβέντο | Bufavento |
| Charkeia | Χαρκεια / Χάρτζια | Karaağaç |
| Diorios | Διόριος | Tepebaşı |
| Elia | Ελιά | Yeşiltepe |
| Fotta | Φώττα | Dağyolu |
| Ftericha | Φτεριχα | Ilgaz |
| Kalogrea | Καλογραία | Bahçeli |
| Kampyli | Καλογραία | Hisarköy |
| Karakoumi | Καράκουμι | Karakum |
| Karavas | Καραβάς | Alsancak |
| Karmi | Κάρμι | Karaman |
| Kato Dikomo | Κάτω Δίκωμο | Aşağıdikmen / Aşağı Dikmen |
| Kazafani | Καζάφανι | Ozanköy / Kazafana |
| Klepini | Κλεπίνη | Arapköy |
| Kyrenia | Κερύνεια | Girne |
| Komurcu | Κιομουρτζιού | Kömürcü |
| Kontemenos | Κοντεμένος | Kılıçaslan |
| Kormakitis | Κορμακίτης | Koruçam / Kormacit |
| Koutoventis | Κουτσοβέντης | Güngör |
| Krini | Κρηνί | Pınarbaşı |
| Lapithos | Λάπηθος | Lapta |
| Larnakas Lapithou | Λάρνακας της Λαπήθου | Kozan |
| Livera | Λιβερά | Sadrazamköy |
| Motides | Μότιδες | Alsancak / İncesu |
| Myrtou | Μύρτου | Çamlıbel |
| Orga | Όρκα | Kayalar |
| Paleosofos | Παλαιόσοφος | Malatya |
| Panagra | Πάναγρα | Geçitköy |
| Pano Dikomo | Πάνω Δίκωμο | Yukarıdikmen / Yukarı Dikmen |
| Pentadaktylos | Πενταδάκτυλος | Beşparmaklar / Beşparmak Dağları |
| Pileri | Πιλέρι | Göçeri |
| Sichari | Συγχαρί | Aşağıtaşkent/Aşağı Taşkent |
| Sysklipos | Σύσκληπος | Akçiçek |
| Templos | Τέμπλος | Zeytinlik / Temroz |
| Thermia | Θέρμεια | Doğanköy |
| Trapeza | Τράπεζα | Beşparmak |
| Trimithi | Τριμίθι | Edremit |
| Vasilia | Bασίλεια | Karşıyaka |
| Vouno | Βουνό | (Yukarı) Taşkent |

==== Larnaca District ====
Minor towns and villages in the Occupied Larnaca District
| Name (en) | Name (gr) | Name (tr) |
|---|---|---|
| Pergamos | Πέργαμoς | Beyarmudu |

==== Nicosia District ====
Minor towns and villages in the Occupied Nicosia District
| Name (en) | Name (gr) | Name (tr) |
|---|---|---|
| Agia Marina | Αγία Μαρίνα | Aymarina |
| Agia Trias | Αγία Τριάς | Sipahi |
| Agios Vasillios | Άγιος Βασίλειος | Türkeli |
| Ammadies | Αμμαδιές | Süleymaniye |
| Ambelikou | Αμπελικού | Bağlıköy |
| Angolemi | Αγγολέμι | Taşpınar |
| Argaki | Αργάκι | Akçay |
| Avlona | Αυλώνα | Gayretköy |
| Beykeuy | Μπέικιοϊ | Beyköy |
| Elia | Ελιά | Doğancı / Elye |
| Epichio | Επηχώ | Cihangir |
| Exometochi | Εξωμετόχι | Düzova |
| Fyllia | Φυλλιά/Φιλιά | Serhatköy |
| Galini | Γαληνή | Ömerli |
| Gerolakkos | Γερόλακκος | Alayköy |
| Kalo Chorio | Καλό Χωριό | Çamlıköy |
| Kalo Chorio Kapouti | Καλό Χωριό Καπούτι | Kalkanlı |
| Kalyvakia | Καλυβάκια | Kalavaç |
| Kanli | Κανλί | Kanlıköy |
| Katokopia | Kατωκοπιά | Zümrütköy |
| Kato Zodia | Κάτω Ζώδεια | Aşağı Bostancı |
| Kazivera | Καζιβερά | Gaziveran / Gaziveren |
| Kioneli | Κιόνελι | Gönyeli |
| Kokkina | Κόκκινα | Erenköy |
| Kourou Monastiri | Κουρού Μοναστήρι | Kuru Manastır / Çukurova |
| Kyra | Κυρά | Mevlevi |
| Kythrea | Κυθρέα | Değirmenlik |
| Lefka | Λεύκα | Lefke |
| Louroujina | Λουρουτζίνα | Akıncılar / Lurucina / Luricina |
| Loutros | Λουτρός | Bademliköy |
| Limnitis | Λιμνίτης | Yeşilırmak |
| Mandres | (Χαμίτ) Μάντρες | Hamitköy |
| Masari | Μάσαρι | Şahinler |
| Mia Milia | Μιά Μηλιά | Haspolat |
| Mora | Μόρα | Meriç |
| Morphou (Morfu) | Μόρφου | Güzelyurt / Omorfo / Morfo |
| Neo Chorio Kythreas | Νέο Χωριό, Κυθρέας | Minareliköy |
| Nikitas | Νικήτας | Güneşköy |
| Ortakoy | Ορτάκιοι | Ortaköy |
| Palekythro | Παλαίκυθρο | Balıkesir |
| Pano Zodia | Πάνω Ζώδεια | Yukarı Bostancı |
| Pentagia | Πεντάγεια | Yeşilyurt |
| Peristeronari | Περιστερωνάρι | Cengizköy |
| Petra | Πέτρα | Petre / Taşköy |
| Petra tou Digeni | Πέτρα του Διγενή | Yeniceköy |
| Potamos tou Kampou | Πoταμός του Κάμπου | Yedidalga |
| Prastio | Πραστιό | Aydınköy |
| Pyrogi | Πυρόι | Gaziler |
| Skylloura | Σκυλλούρα | Yılmazköy / Şillura |
| Syrianochori | Συριανοχώρι | Yayla |
| Trachoni | Τραχώνι | Demirhan |
| Tymbou | Τύμπου | Kırklar |
| Tymbou Airport | Αεροδρόμιο Τύμπου | Ercan Havaalani |
| Voni | Βώνη | Gökhan |
| Xeros | Ξερός | Gemikonağı / Denizli |
| Xerovounos | Ξερόβουνος | Yukarı Yeşilırmak |

== See also ==
- Districts of Cyprus
- Districts of Northern Cyprus
- List of uninhabited villages in Northern Cyprus
- List of populated places in Northern Cyprus
