= Mandria =

Mandria is the name of the following settlements :

- Mandria, Limassol, a village in Cyprus
- Mandria, Paphos, a village in Cyprus
