= Loutros, Cyprus =

Loutros: Λουτρός (Greek); Bademliköy (Turkish)
- Location within Cyprus
- Coordinates: 35°08′45″N 32°44′47″E
- Country (de jure): Cyprus
  - District: Nicosia District
- Country (de facto): Northern Cyprus
  - District: Lefke District

Population (2011)
  - Total: 93
- Time zone: UTC+2 (EET)
  - Summer (DST): UTC+3 (EEST)

Loutros (Greek: Λουτρός; Turkish: Bademliköy) is a small village located in the Nicosia District of Cyprus, west of the town of Karavostasi. De facto, it is under the control of Northern Cyprus.

Loutros was originally inhabited by Greek Cypriots; they all fled during the 1974 Turkish invasion. The village was reinhabited in the late 1970s by Turkish Cypriots from Xerovounos, and a small number of Turks from Turkey and displaced Turkish Cypriots from Terra and Mandria.
