= Milya =

Milya may refer to:

- Milyas, a mountainous country in ancient south-west Anatolia
  - Milyan language, also known as Lycian B and previously Lycian 2, is an extinct ancient Anatolian language
- Milia, Famagusta, a village in the Famagusta District of Cyprus
