= Agios Amvrosios =

Agios Amvrosios is the name of two settlements in Cyprus:

- Agios Amvrosios, Kyrenia, a town east of Kyrenia
- Agios Amvrosios, Limassol, a small village northwest of Limassol
