= The Heritage Private School =

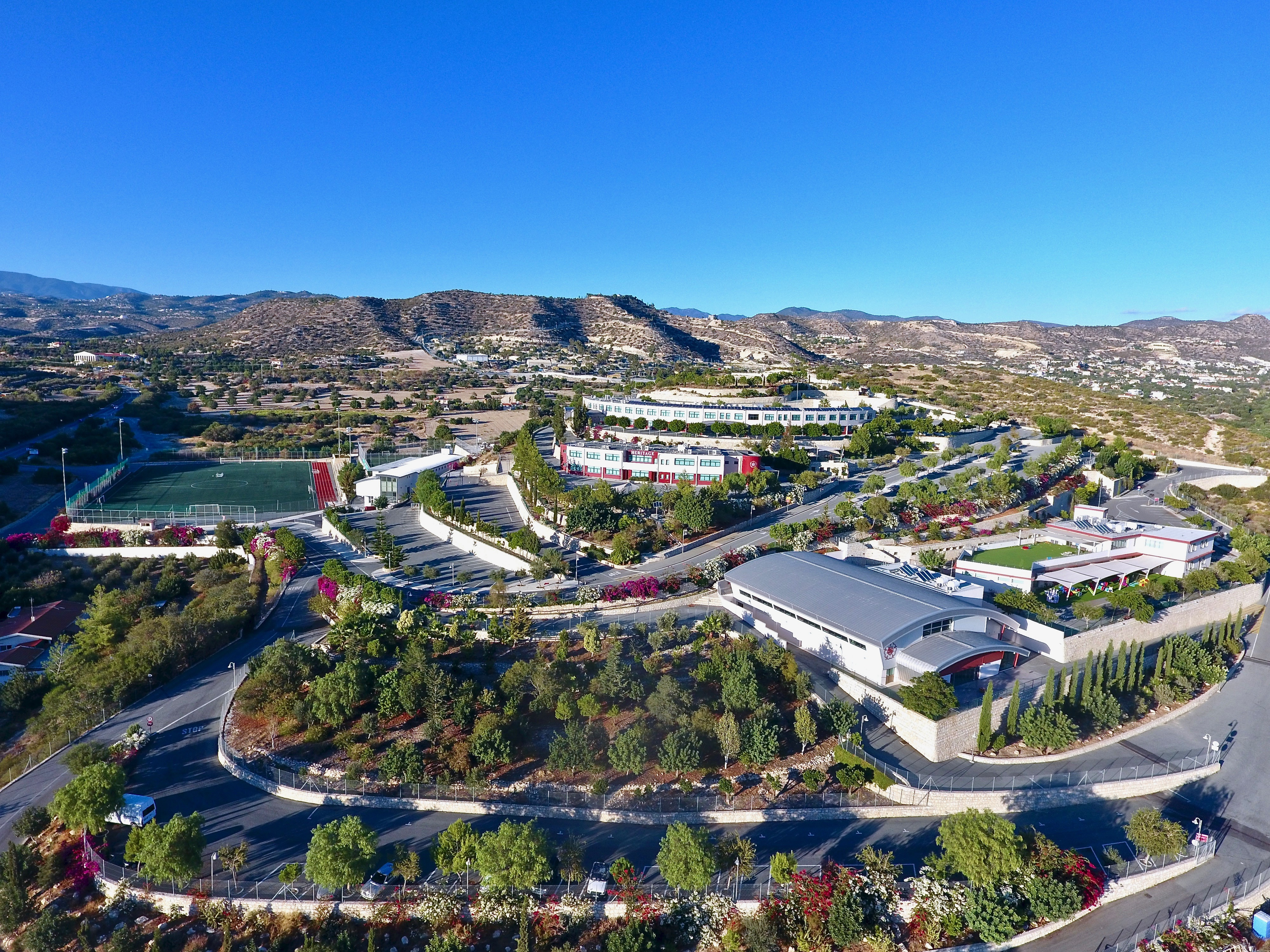
- The school's campus
- Limassol; Cyprus

Information
- Type: International Private school
- Established: 1987; 39 years ago
- Gender: Co-educational
- Age: 2 1/2 to 19
- Enrolment: 1,500 (approx.)
- Average class size: Kindergarten: 20 and in Primary and Secondary: 24(AS/A2=15)
- Website: www.hps.ac.cy

The Heritage Private School is an English medium IGCSE school in the village of Palodeia, about five kilometres (three miles) north of the Limassol motorway, in Cyprus. The school teaches over 1500 students between the ages of 2-19. The school offers 16 years of schooling for any student: 3 years in kindergarten, pre-reception and reception (early years), another 6 in primary and a further 7 in secondary.

== Overview ==
Starting from the 4th year in secondary onwards, the school offers students IGCSE subjects from prominent organizations Cambridge and Edexcel and is an exam centre approved by both boards (thus is eligible to host examinations from these boards within its own campus). Students must take exams for all subjects they have studied at the end of the 5th year of secondary and each subject is assessed externally and independently by the board offering it.

Starting from the 6th year of secondary onwards, students must do A-levels (subjects are again from Cambridge and Edexcel) and take examinations in both the 6th and 7th year of secondary school.

There are four faculties on the campus, namely the secondary, upper primary, lower primary and early years school buildings, and each functions independently of the others with its own staff, students, rooms and equipment.

In addition to the main school buildings, there are several secondary structures, such as numerous sports grounds, a multipurpose hall (used for theatre, presentations, examinations and in some cases sports), an amphitheatre (used for evacuations and ceremonies or special events) as well as the school's own parking grounds that can effectively hold upwards of 250 parked vehicles at any given time.

== See also ==
- Education in Cyprus
- University of Cambridge International Examinations
- UK National Curriculum
- Department of Education
