= Zodeia =

Zodeia may refer to:

- Kato Zodeia, a village in Cyprus
- Pano Zodeia, a village in Cyprus
