= Limnia =

Limnia can refer to

- Limnia, Cyprus, a village in Cyprus
- Limnia (Greek: Λίμνια), islands disputed between Greece and Turkey
- Limnia (Pontus), a region of the medieval Empire of Trebizond, now in northern Turkey
- Limnia (fly), a genus of flies in the family Sciomyzidae
