= Zeytinlik =

Zeytinlik is a Turkish place name meaning "olive grove." It may refer to:

- Zeytinlik, Artvin, a village in the central district of Artvin Province, Turkey
- Templos, a village in the Kyrenia district of Cyprus, whose Turkish name is Zeytinlik
- Zeitenlik, a World War I Entente military cemetery in Thessaloniki, Greece
