= Kazivera =

Kazivera: Καζιβερά (Greek); Gaziveren (Turkish)
- Location within Cyprus
- Coordinates: 35°10′18″N 32°54′54″E
- Country (de jure): Cyprus
  - District: Nicosia District
- Country (de facto): Northern Cyprus
  - District: Lefke District

Population (2011)
  - Total: 1,042
- Time zone: UTC+2 (EET)
  - Summer (DST): UTC+3 (EEST)

Kazivera or Ghaziveran (Greek: Καζιβερά; Turkish: Gaziveren) is a small village in Cyprus, west of Morphou. De facto, it is under the control of Northern Cyprus.
