= Pera Pedi =

Pera Pedi Πέρα Πεδί
- Village
- Location in Cyprus
- Coordinates: 34°51′34″N 32°52′34″E
- Country: Cyprus
- District: Limassol

Population (2001)
  - Total: 66
- Time zone: UTC+2 (EET)
  - Summer (DST): UTC+3 (EEST)

Pera Pedi (Greek: Πέρα Πεδί) is a village in the Limassol District of Cyprus, located 4 km south-east of Pano Platres. The E802 road serves the village, and connects to Mandria in the West and Trimiklini in the East. It is the birthplace of former president Nicos Anastasiades.
