= Peristeronari =

Peristeronari: Περιστερωνάρι (Greek); Cengizköy (Turkish)
- Location within Cyprus
- Coordinates: 35°07′56″N 32°51′50″E
- Country (de jure): Cyprus
  - District: Nicosia District
- Country (de facto): Northern Cyprus
  - District: Lefke District

Population (2011)
  - Total: 217
- Time zone: UTC+2 (EET)
  - Summer (DST): UTC+3 (EEST)

Peristeronari (Greek: Περιστερωνάρι; Turkish: Cengizköy) is a village in Cyprus, near Lefka. De facto, it is under the control of Northern Cyprus.
