= Avlona, Cyprus =

Avlona: Αυλώνα (Greek); Gayretköy (Turkish)
- Location within Cyprus
- Coordinates: 35°09′40″N 33°06′22″E
- Country (de jure): Cyprus
  - District: Nicosia District
- Country (de facto): Northern Cyprus
  - District: Güzelyurt District

Population (2011)
  - Total: 367
- Time zone: UTC+2 (EET)
  - Summer (DST): UTC+3 (EEST)

Avlona (Greek: Αυλώνα; Turkish: Gayretköy) is a village in Cyprus, about halfway between Nicosia and Morphou. De facto, it is under the illegal control of Northern Cyprus.
