= Kyra, Cyprus =

Kyra: Κυρά (Greek); Mevlevi (Turkish)
- Location within Cyprus
- Coordinates: 35°12′09″N 33°03′28″E
- Country (de jure): Cyprus
  - District: Nicosia District
- Country (de facto): Northern Cyprus
  - District: Güzelyurt District

Population (2011)
  - Total: 386
- Time zone: UTC+2 (EET)
  - Summer (DST): UTC+3 (EEST)

Kyra (Greek: Κυρά; Turkish: Mevlevi) is a village located in the Nicosia District of Cyprus, 6 km east of Morphou. De facto, it is under the control of Northern Cyprus.

Originally inhabited by Greek Cypriots, since the Turkish invasion in 1974, the village has been solely inhabited by Turks. The village was also renamed as Mevlevi after this. The Church of Panagia is used by the Turkish army as a depot.
