= Pissouri =

Coordinates: 34°40′N 32°42′E

Pissouri Πισσούρι (Greek)
- Village
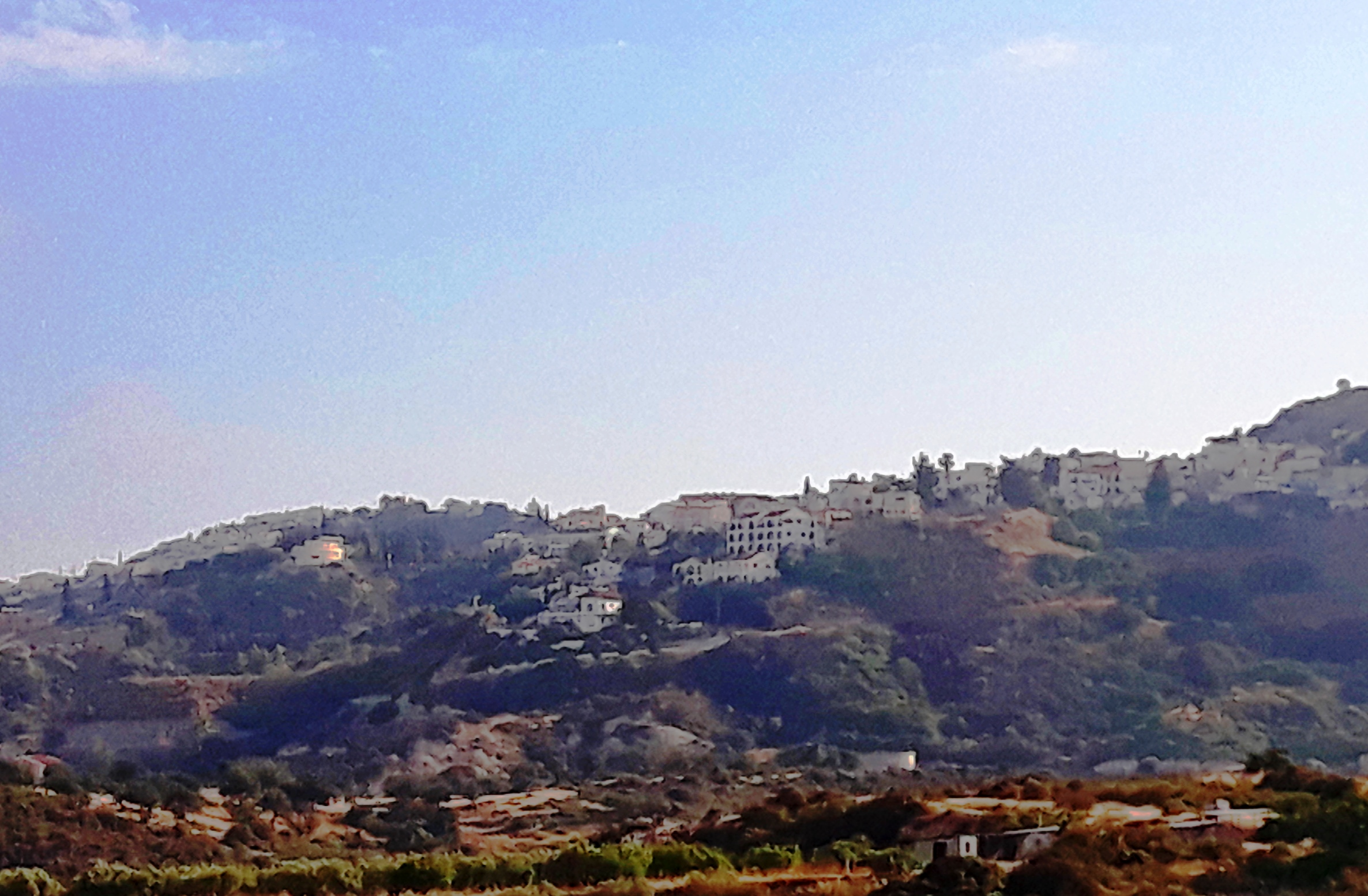
- Interactive map of Pissouri
- Country: Cyprus
- District: Limassol District

Government
  - Mayor: Lazaros Lazarou
  - Executive Director: Petros Foutas

Population (2001)
  - Total: 1,033
- Time zone: UTC+2 (EET)
  - Summer (DST): UTC+3 (EEST)
- Postal code: 4607
- Website: https://www.pissouri.org.cy/

Pissouri (Greek: Πισσούρι) is a village in the Limassol District, Cyprus, located approximately thirty kilometres west of Limassol’s centre, between Limassol and Paphos. Pissouri’s administrative area is the third largest in Limassol District. The main settlement of Pissouri is lies about three kilometres away from the bay known as Cape Aspro and is built on the slope of a green hill. The settlement is situated roughly in the centre of Pissouri’s territory.

Now they form two distinct communities: Pissouri Village Area and Pissouri Bay Area. The total permanent population is estimated at 1100 people, roughly half of whom are Cypriots; the remainder are foreigners, mainly British - who include both residents and visitors.

There are several shops, and many tavernas, restaurants cafes and bars in the village and bay.

== Names ==
According to some official sources, the name Pissouri derives from the ancient city of ‘Voousoura’, as reported by Stravonas, a 1st-century BCE to the 1st-century CE philosopher, mathematician and geographer. Other sources link the village's name to the phrase referring to pitch-dark nights.

A legend recounts that the 300 Alamanoi (German) saints who came to Cyprus in the 7th century from Syria Palaestina in order to practice asceticism in various parts of the island, arrived on the coast of Pissouri during a pitch-dark night. Another legend claims that ‘the Saint Fathers’ who were persecuted during the post-Christian period, were encountered in Pissouri region on an exceptionally dark (pitch-dark) night. However, it appears that the name of the village does not in fact derive from these legends, but from the extensive extraction of resin from pine trees in the area (called ‘pissa’ in Greek). The resin production began during the Byzantine Empire (Eastern Roman Empire), continued through the Middle Ages (5th – 15th centuries) and the Frankish era in Cyprus.

== Development and occupation ==
Pissouri receives an annual rainfall of roughly 447 millimetres. Local agricultural products nowadays include table grapes, wine, potatoes and other citrus fruits in smaller quantities cultivated across the valley that stretches from the gulf to the hilltop settlement. There are also many olive, carob, and almond trees. Unfortunately, in recent years, farmers had to eradicate a large portion of their vineyards, as they became unprofitable. During the last decade, and in particular the last 6 years, the residents have had to shift to alternative sources of income that offer better returns. Most have become significantly involved in construction and specifically with the development of numerous residential properties and new neighbourhoods. It is a matter of time before the village becomes practically self-sufficient in terms of services and facilities found locally. Pissouri seems to evolve rapidly, following trends associated with globalisation and foreign investment'.

== Churches ==
The Church of Apostle Andrea was built through voluntary work by the public-spirited members of the community in 1883. The work for construction of the church lasted for about twelve years. The stone used in the church came from the villages of Anogyra and Prasteio and was transported to the village by carts which were drawn by Cypriot donkeys. The church is built in Gothic style. The site on which it stands was used as the village cemetery until 1912.

The church is famous for its carved wooden Icon Stand, which is a real work of art and was manufactured in 1890. Its creation took ten full years to complete because of the limited means available at that time.

Other chapels include: Saint George, Prophet Elias, Saint Alexandros, Saint Mauritius, Saint Spyridonas.
