= Elia, Nicosia =

Elia: Ελιά (Greek); Doğancı (Turkish)
- Location within Cyprus
- Coordinates: 35°07′57″N 32°54′44″E
- Country (de jure): Cyprus
  - District: Nicosia District
- Country (de facto): Northern Cyprus
  - District: Lefke District

Government
  - Mukhtar: Ali Yılmaz Çölaşan

Population (2011)
  - Total: 1,299
- Time zone: UTC+2 (EET)
  - Summer (DST): UTC+3 (EEST)

Elia (Greek: Ελιά; post-1974 Turkish: Doğancı, pre-1974 Turkish: Elye) is a village in Cyprus, located east of Lefka. De facto, it is under the control of Northern Cyprus.
