= Masari =

Masari: Μάσαρι (Greek); Şahinler (Turkish)
- Location within Cyprus
- Coordinates: 35°11′10″N 33°04′29″E
- Country (de jure): Cyprus
  - District: Nicosia District
- Country (de facto): Northern Cyprus
  - District: Güzelyurt District

Population (2011)
  - Total: 189
- Time zone: UTC+2 (EET)
  - Summer (DST): UTC+3 (EEST)

Masari (Greek: (το) Μάσαρι; Turkish: Şahinler) is a small village in Cyprus, east of Morphou. De facto, it is under the control of Northern Cyprus.
