= Agia Triada, Cyprus =

Village in northeastern Cyprus

Agia Triada: Αγία Τριάδα (Greek); Sipahi (Turkish)
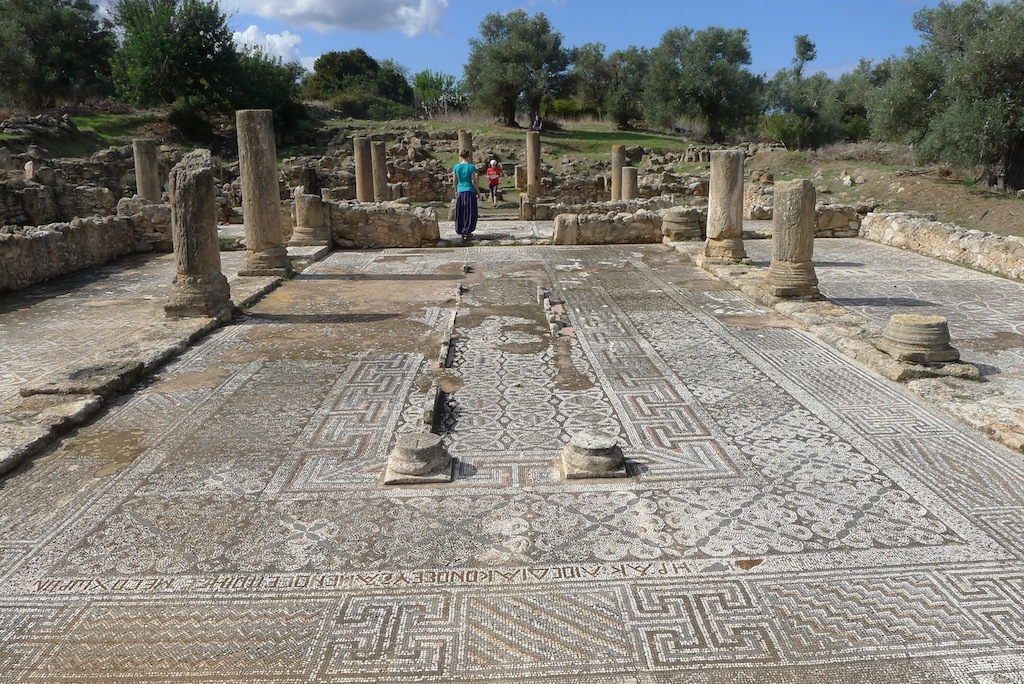
- Mosaic floor in the ruins of the Agia Triada Basilica

- Location within Cyprus
- Coordinates: 35°32′22″N 34°13′10″E
- Country (de jure): Cyprus
  - District: Famagusta District
- Country (de facto): Northern Cyprus (Note: In 1983, the Turkish Republic of Northern Cyprus unilaterally declared independence from the Republic of Cyprus. The de facto state is not recognised by any UN state except Turkey.)
  - District: İskele District

Population (2011)
  - Total: 614
- Climate: Csa

Agia Triada, also known as Agias Trias (Greek: Αγία Τριάδα, lit. 'the Holy Trinity', also known as Αγία Τριάς; Turkish: Sipahi, lit. 'cavalry', formerly Aytriada) is a village on the Karpas Peninsula, 2 kilometres (1.2 mi) east of Gialousa, in Cyprus. The village is de jure part of the internationally recognized Republic of Cyprus but after the Turkish invasion of Cyprus in 1974 it, along with much of the rest of the northern part of Cyprus, has been under the de facto control of the internationally unrecognized Turkish Republic of Northern Cyprus and the other administrative bodies which preceded its unilateral declaration of independence in 1983.

== Demographics ==
As of 2011, the village a population of 614, a decrease of about 6.8% from its 2006 population of 659. Of those 614 inhabitants, 295 (48%) were male and 319 (52%) were female.

== Basilica ==
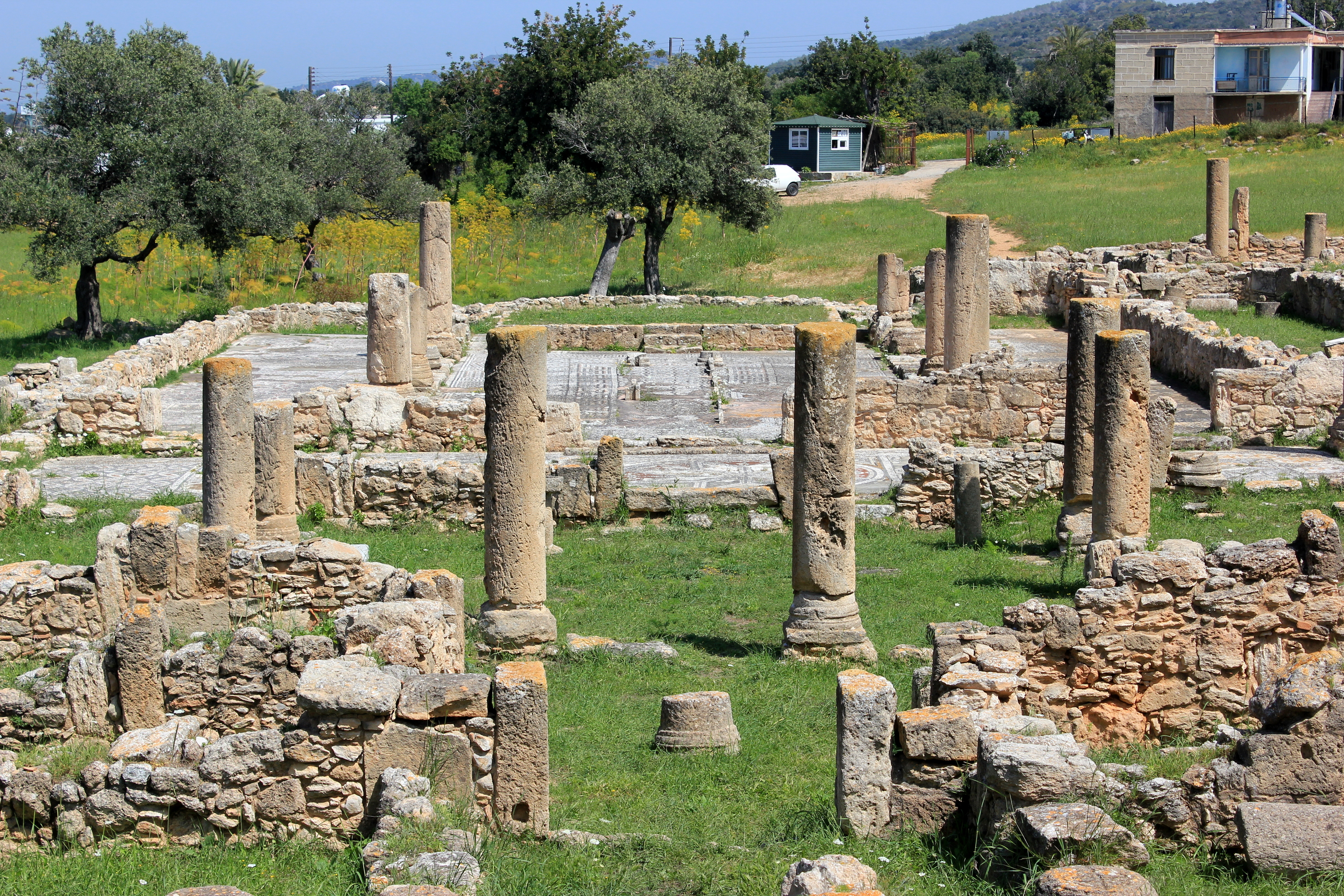
Ruins of Agia Triada Basilica as viewed from the east

The ruins of the early Christian Agia Triada Basilica, dated to the 5th or 6th century CE, are located in the vicinity of the modern settlement. The basilica was ruined in the mid 7th century, and subsequently uncovered in the process an excavation that took place from 1935 to 1938. A major feature of the site is the mosaic floor, which, along with other features, underwent restoration efforts lasting from 2018 to 2019.
