= Nikitas =

Nikitas: Νικήτας (Greek); Güneşköy (Turkish)
- Location within Cyprus
- Coordinates: 35°10′33″N 32°57′23″E
- Country (de jure): Cyprus
  - District: Nicosia District
- Country (de facto): Northern Cyprus
  - District: Güzelyurt District

Population (2011)
  - Total: 505
- Time zone: UTC+2 (EET)
  - Summer (DST): UTC+3 (EEST)

Nikitas (Greek: Νικήτας; Turkish: Güneşköy) is a village in Cyprus, 4 km southwest of Morphou. De facto, it is under the control of the Turkish Republic of Northern Cyprus.
