= Angolemi =

Angolemi: Αγγολέμι (Greek); Taşpınar (Turkish)
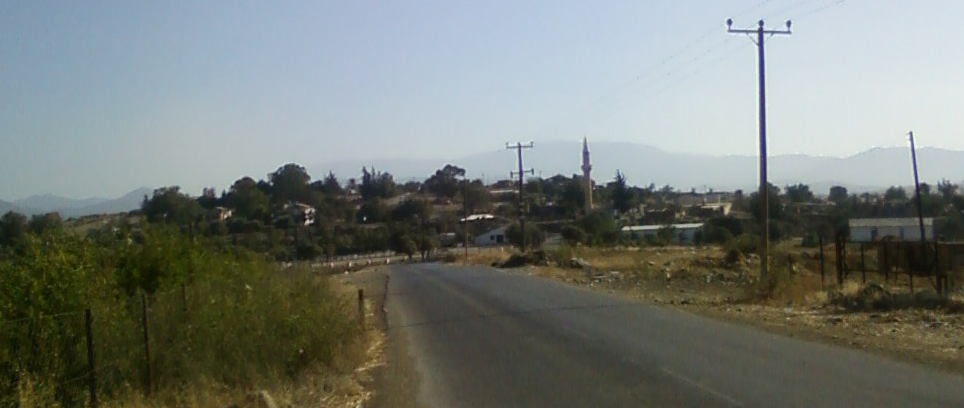

- Location within Cyprus
- Coordinates: 35°07′04″N 32°56′51″E
- Country (de jure): Cyprus
  - District: Nicosia District
- Country (de facto): Northern Cyprus
  - District: Lefke District
- Elevation: 182 m (597 ft)

Population (2011)
  - Total: 181
- Time zone: UTC+2 (EET)
  - Summer (DST): UTC+3 (EEST)

Angolemi (Greek: Αγγολέμι; Turkish: Taşpınar) is a village in the Nicosia District of Cyprus, southwest of Morphou. De facto, it is administered as part of the Lefke District of Northern Cyprus.

== Etymology ==
According to a suggestion, the name Angolemi is given by the Lusignans, after the town of Angoulême in France. Some sources say that a knight from Angoulême lived in the village in the Middle Ages.

Another suggestion says that the name is derived from the former Patriarch of Antioch, Pierre d'Angoulême.

The village is commonly known as Angolem among local people.

== Architecture ==
The houses in the village are mainly made of adobe, while concrete ones are also present. The village has developed to the fields outside the village since early 2000s.

Many houses are neglected and abandoned because of migration to Nicosia. There are unused vehicles in the streets.

== Demographics ==
The first information about the population of the village is from the time of Mahmud II.

Population by year
| 2011 | 181 |
| 2006 | 212 |
| 1996 | 245 |
| 1960 | 222 |
| 1946 | 208 |
| 1831 | 25 (only men) |
