= Xeros, Cyprus =

Xeros: Ξερός (Greek); Denizli (Turkish)
- Xeros
- Location within Cyprus
- Coordinates: 35°08′50″N 32°51′05″E
- Country (de jure): Cyprus
- District: Nicosia District
- Country (de facto): Northern Cyprus
- District: Lefke District

Population (2011)
  - Total: 460
- Time zone: UTC+02:00 (EET)
  - Summer (DST): UTC+03:00 (EEST)

Xeros (Greek: Ξερός; Turkish: Denizli) is a village in Cyprus, east of Karavostasi. It is under the de facto control of Northern Cyprus. According to Cyprus Republic, it is a quarter of Karavostasi.

== Sports ==
Turkish Cypriot Denizli Sports Club was founded in 1985; as of 2015, they compete in Cyprus Turkish Football Association (CTFA) K-PET 2nd League.
