= Fyllia =

Fyllia: Φυλλιά (Greek); Serhatköy (Turkish)
- Location within Cyprus
- Coordinates: 35°11′17″N 33°05′27″E
- Country (de jure): Cyprus
  - District: Nicosia District
- Country (de facto): Northern Cyprus
  - District: Güzelyurt District

Population (2011)
  - Total: 573
- Time zone: UTC+2 (EET)
  - Summer (DST): UTC+3 (EEST)

Fyllia (Greek: Φυλλιά or Φιλιά; Turkish: Serhatköy) is a village in Cyprus, 9 km east of Morphou. De facto, it is under the control of Northern Cyprus.

In 2011, the Serhartköy Photovoltaic Power Plant (with 2 GWh annual electricity capacity) was constructed by the help of the Council of the European Union to Turkish Cypriots.
