= Prastio, Nicosia =

Prastio: Πραστιό (Greek); Aydınköy (Turkish)
- Location within Cyprus
- Coordinates: 35°10′28″N 32°56′14″E
- Country (de jure): Cyprus
  - District: Nicosia District
- Country (de facto): Northern Cyprus
  - District: Güzelyurt District

Population (2011)
  - Total: 1,164
- Time zone: UTC+2 (EET)
  - Summer (DST): UTC+3 (EEST)

Prastio (Greek: Πραστιό; Turkish: Aydınköy) is a village in Cyprus, 6 km southwest of Morphou. De facto, it is under the control of Northern Cyprus.
