= Ambelikou =

Ambelikou: Αμπελικού (Greek); Bağlıköy (Turkish)
- Location within Cyprus
- Coordinates: 35°07′15″N 32°48′30″E
- Country (de jure): Cyprus
  - District: Nicosia District
- Country (de facto): Northern Cyprus
  - District: Lefke District

Population (2011)
  - Total: 200
- Time zone: UTC+2 (EET)
  - Summer (DST): UTC+3 (EEST)

Ambelikou (Greek: (το) Αμπελικού; Turkish: Bağlıköy) is a village in Cyprus, west of Lefka. De facto, it is under the control of Northern Cyprus.

== History ==
From the Ottoman period until the outbreak of intercommunal violence, Ampelikou was a mixed village with a Turkish Cypriot majority. The 1831 census recorded 55 Turkish Cypriot and 11 Greek Cypriot male adult residents. The village's population increased from 308 in 1831 to a peak of 641 in 1946; during the same period, the share of the Greek Cypriot population rose from 17% to 26.5%.
