= Potamos tou Kampou =

Village in Cyprus

Potamos tou Kampou: Ποταμός του Κάμπου (Greek); Yedidalga (Turkish)
- Location within Cyprus
- Coordinates: 35°08′39″N 32°48′28″E
- Country (de jure): Cyprus
  - District: Nicosia District
- Country (de facto): Northern Cyprus
  - District: Lefke District

Population (2011)
  - Total: 669
- Time zone: UTC+2 (EET)
  - Summer (DST): UTC+3 (EEST)

Potamos tou Kampou (Greek: Πoταμός του Κάμπου; Turkish: Yedidalga) is a small village in Cyprus, west of Karavostasi. De facto, it is under the control of Northern Cyprus. According to Cyprus Republic, it is a quarter of Karavostasi.
