= Vavla =

Vavla Βάβλα
- Village and Municipal District
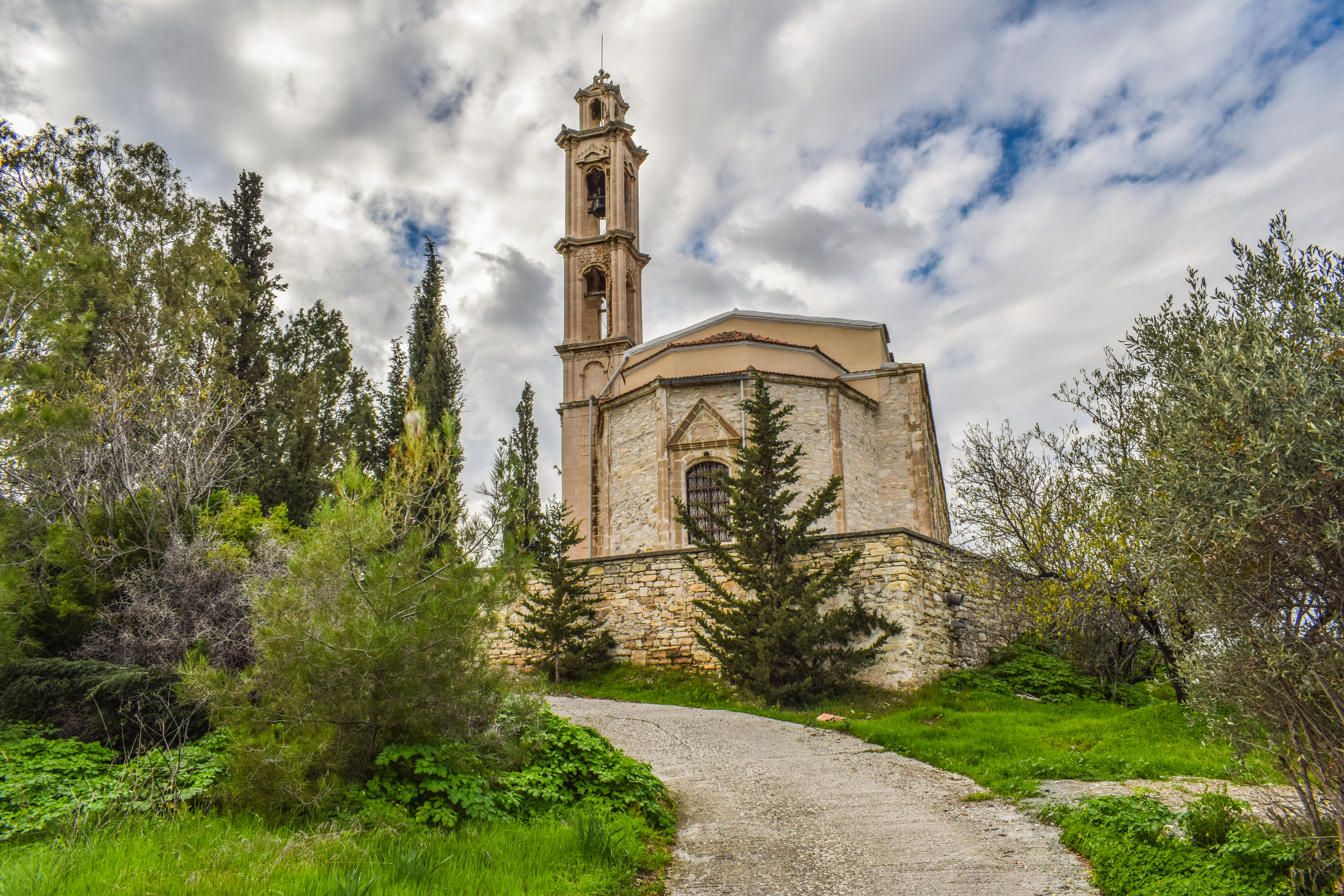

- Location in Cyprus
- Coordinates: 34°50′28″N 33°16′4″E
- Country: Cyprus
- District: Larnaca District
- Municipality: Lefkara Municipality

Population (2021)
  - Total: 50
- Time zone: UTC+2 (EET)
  - Summer (DST): UTC+3 (EEST)

Vavla (Greek: Βάβλα) is a small village and a municipal district of Lefkara Municipality in Larnaca District, Cyprus. Its population in 2011 was 52.
