= Argaki =

Argaki: Αργάκι (Greek); Akçay (Turkish)
- Location within Cyprus
- Coordinates: 35°10′47″N 33°02′07″E
- Country (de jure): Cyprus
  - District: Nicosia District
- Country (de facto): Northern Cyprus
  - District: Güzelyurt District

Population (2011)
  - Total: 1,008
- Time zone: UTC+2 (EET)
  - Summer (DST): UTC+3 (EEST)

Argaki (Greek: Αργάκι, locally [ar̥ˈkat͡ʃi]; Turkish: Akçay) is a village in Cyprus, southeast of the city of Morphou. De facto, it is under the control of Northern Cyprus, considered by the international community to be part of the Republic of Cyprus.
