= Komi Kebir =

Komi Kebir: Κώμη Κεπήρ (Greek); Büyükkonuk (Turkish)
- Village
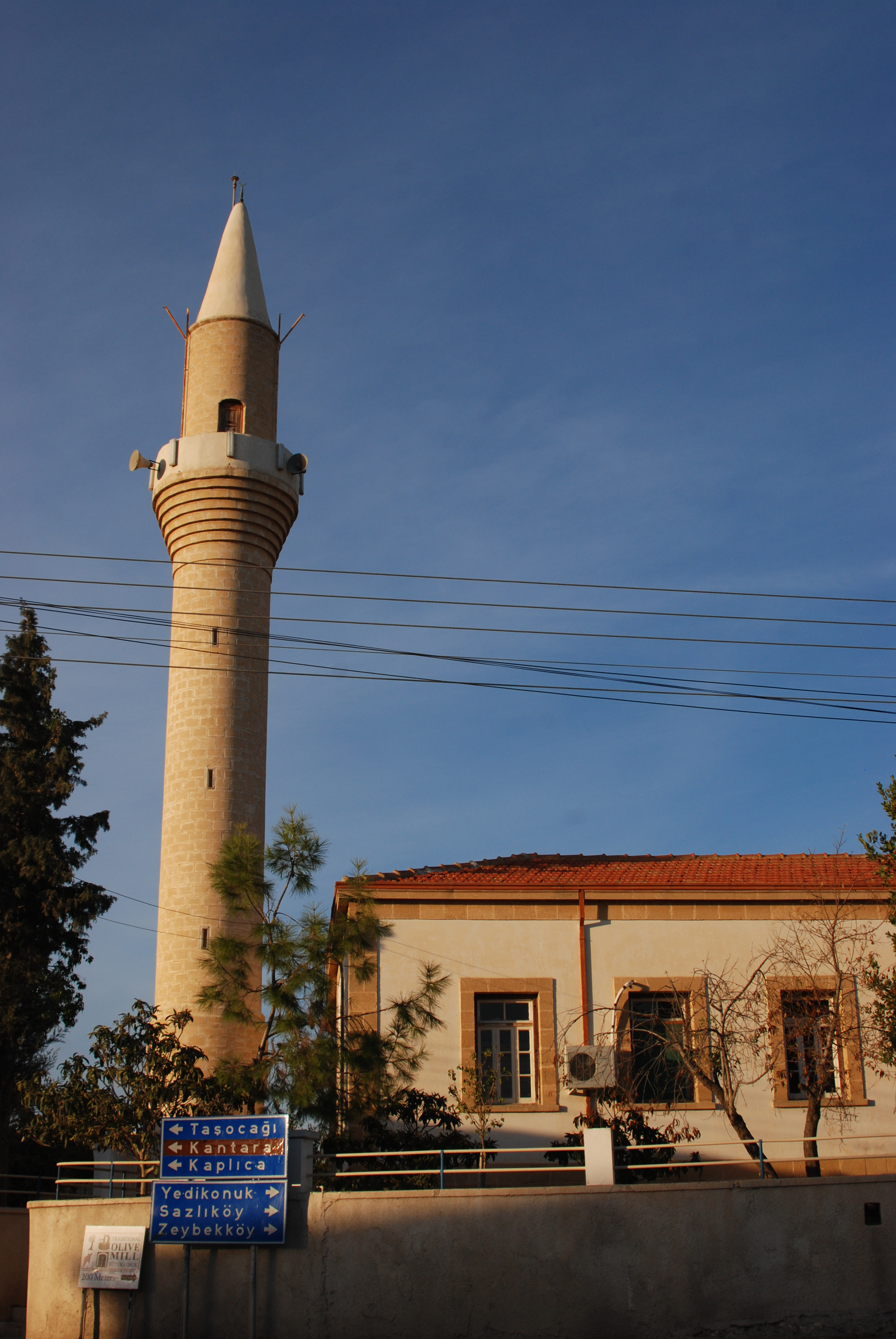
- The mosque in Komi Kebir

- Location in Cyprus
- Coordinates: 35°24′36″N 33°59′49″E
- Country (de jure): Cyprus
  - District: Famagusta District
- Country (de facto): Northern Cyprus
  - District: İskele District
- Established: 1980

Government
  - Type: Municipality
  - Mayor: Ahmet Sennaroglu

Population (2011)
  - Total: 812
  - Municipality: 2,860
- Website: Buyukkonuk Turkish municipality

Komi Kebir (Greek: Κώμη Κεπήρ [locally [ˈkomi cʰeˈpir]]; Turkish: Büyükkonuk or Komikebir) is a village under the de facto control of Northern Cyprus, claimed by Cyprus. It is located on the Karpas Peninsula, 33 kilometres (21 mi) north of Famagusta, and at an altitude of 90 metres (295 feet). As of 2011, it had a population of 812.

Before 1974, Komi Kebir was inhabited both by Greek- and Turkish Cypriots. The Greek Cypriots constituted the majority. In 1973, an estimated 762 people were living in the village, of whom 200 were Turkish- and 562 Greek-Cypriot. 66 students were enrolled at the Greek-Cypriot primary school for the academic year of 1973–74.

At the borders of the village, there are the churches of Saint George, Saint Afksentios and Saint Loukas. There are also the ancient churches of Panagia Kira, Saint George Parouzos, Saint Vasilios (in ruins), Saint Photiou (in ruins) and Saint Katherine (in ruins).
