= Gerolakkos =

Gerolakkos: Γερόλακκος (Greek); Alayköy (Turkish)
- Location within Cyprus
- Coordinates: 35°11′N 33°15′E
- Country (de jure): Cyprus
  - District: Nicosia District
- Country (de facto): Northern Cyprus
  - District: Lefkoşa District

Population (2011)
  - Total: 2,777
  - Municipality: 3,884
- Time zone: UTC+2 (EET)
  - Summer (DST): UTC+3 (EEST)
- Website: Turkish Cypriot municipality

Gerolakkos (Greek: Γερόλακκος; Turkish: Alayköy) is a village near Nicosia, the capital of Cyprus. It is immediately north of the Green Line. Nicosia International Airport (now defunct) is located about 2 km to its south-east. De facto, Gerolakkos is under the control of Northern Cyprus.
