= Kato Zodeia =

Kato Zodeia: Κάτω Ζώδεια (Greek); Aşağı Bostancı (Turkish)
- Location within Cyprus
- Coordinates: 35°10′04″N 33°00′26″E
- Country (de jure): Cyprus
  - District: Nicosia District
- Country (de facto): Northern Cyprus
  - District: Güzelyurt District

Population (2011)
  - Total: 3,317
- Time zone: UTC+2 (EET)
  - Summer (DST): UTC+3 (EEST)

Kato Zodeia (Greek: (η) Κάτω Ζώδεια; Turkish: Aşağı Bostancı) is a village on the island of Cyprus, east of Morphou. De facto, it is under the control of Northern Cyprus.

== Green Line crossing ==
Kato Zodeia is the location of one of six Green Line crossings between the Republic of Cyprus and Northern Cyprus. The town on the Republic side of the border is Astromeritis. The crossing is only for vehicular traffic. It was opened on 31 August 2005.
