= Xerovounos =

Xerovounos: Ξερόβουνος (Greek); Yukarı Yeşilırmak (Turkish)
- Location within Cyprus
- Coordinates: 35°08′48″N 32°43′59″E
- Country (de jure): Cyprus
  - District: Nicosia District
- Country (de facto): Northern Cyprus
  - District: Lefke District
- Time zone: UTC+2 (EET)
  - Summer (DST): UTC+3 (EEST)

Xerovounos (Greek: Ξερόβουνος; Turkish: Yukarı Yeşilırmak) is an abandoned village located in the Nicosia District of Cyprus, west of Karavostasi. De facto, it is under the control of Northern Cyprus. Between 1958 and 1975, it was called Kurutepe in Turkish.
