= Kanlıköy =

Kanlıköy: Κανλί (Greek); Kanlıköy (Turkish)
- Location in Cyprus
- Coordinates: 35°13′20″N 33°15′30″E
- Country (de jure): Cyprus
  - District: Nicosia District
- Country (de facto): Northern Cyprus
  - District: Lefkoşa District

Population (2011)
  - Total: 232
- Time zone: UTC+2 (EET)
  - Summer (DST): UTC+3 (EEST)

Kanlıköy (Greek: Κανλί, romanized: Kanli; Turkish: Kanlıköy) is a village in Cyprus, 5 km west of Gönyeli. De facto, it is under the control of Northern Cyprus.
