= Limnia, Cyprus =

Limnia: Λιμνιά (Greek); Mormenekşe (Turkish)
- Village
- Location in Cyprus
- Coordinates: 35°12′3″N 33°51′42″E
- Country (de jure): Cyprus
  - District: Famagusta District
- Country (de facto): Northern Cyprus
  - District: Gazimağusa District
- Time zone: UTC+2 (EET)
  - Summer (DST): UTC+3 (EEST)

Limnia (Greek: Λιμνιά; Turkish: Mormenekşe) is a village in the Famagusta District of Cyprus, located just north of the city of Famagusta. It is under the de facto control of Northern Cyprus.

Limnia lies closely to Aloa and Agios Sergios and Famagusta. In the centre of the village is the church of Saint George built in 1862.

The village is known for its artichokes.
