= Chatos =

Chatos: Τζιάος (Greek); Serdarlı (Turkish)
- Location in Cyprus
- Coordinates: 35°15′9″N 33°36′3″E
- Country (de jure): Cyprus
  - District: Famagusta District
- Country (de facto): Northern Cyprus
  - District: Gazimağusa District

Government
  - Mayor: Halil Kasım

Population (2011)
  - Total: 1,055
  - Municipality: 2,411
- Time zone: UTC+2 (EET)
  - Summer (DST): UTC+3 (EEST)
- Website: Turkish Cypriot municipality

Chatos or Tziaos (Greek: Τζιάος or Κιάδος; Turkish: Serdarlı or Çatoz) is a Turkish Cypriot village in Cyprus, located 3 km north of Marathovounos. It is under the de facto control of Northern Cyprus, as is the northern 38% of the island since 1974.
