= Agios Amvrosios, Kyrenia =

Agios Amvrosios: Άγιος Αμβρόσιος (Greek); Esentepe (Turkish)
- Village
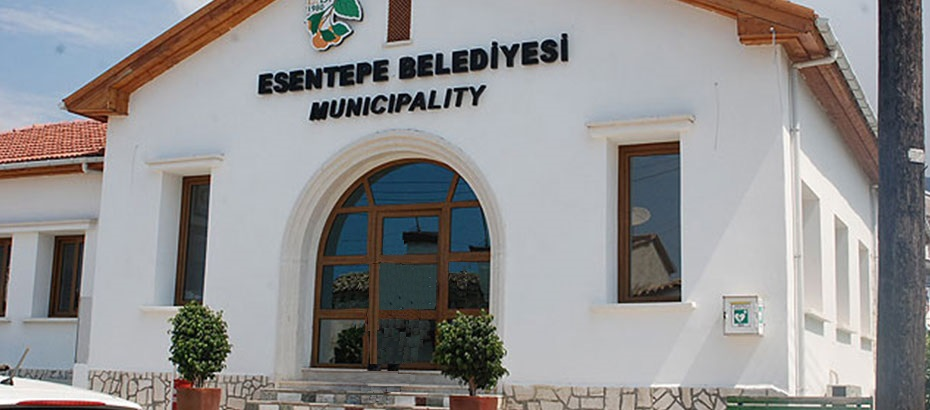

- Location in Cyprus
- Coordinates: 35°20′26″N 33°34′54″E
- Country (de jure): Cyprus
  - District: Kyrenia District
- Country (de facto): Northern Cyprus
  - District: Girne District

Population (2011)
  - Total: 1,754
  - Municipality: 2,414
- Time zone: UTC+2 (EET)
  - Summer (DST): UTC+3 (EEST)

Agios Amvrosios (Greek: Άγιος Αμβρόσιος; Turkish: Esentepe, literally meaning "Breezing hill") is a village located in the Kyrenia District of Cyprus, east of Kyrenia. It is under the de facto control of Northern Cyprus.

== Culture, sports, and tourism ==
Turkish Cypriot Esentepe Sports Club was founded in 1975, and now in Cyprus Turkish Football Association (CTFA) K-PET 1st League.

== International relations ==
=== Twin towns – sister cities ===
Agios Amvrosios is twinned with:

- Kartal, Istanbul, Turkey
