= Milia, Famagusta =

Milia: Μηλιά (Greek); Yıldırım (Turkish)
- Village
- Location in Cyprus
- Coordinates: 35°14′22″N 33°46′54″E
- Country (de jure): Cyprus
  - District: Famagusta District
- Country (de facto): Northern Cyprus
  - District: Gazimağusa District
- Time zone: UTC+2 (EET)
  - Summer (DST): UTC+3 (EEST)

Milia (Greek: Μηλιά, literally 'Apple tree'; (Turkish: Yıldırım)) is a village in the Famagusta District of Cyprus. It is under the de facto control of Northern Cyprus.
