= Templos =

Templos: Τέμπλος (Greek); Zeytinlik (Turkish)
- Location in Cyprus
- Coordinates: 35°19′52″N 33°17′39″E
- Country (de jure): Cyprus
  - District: Kyrenia District
- Country (de facto): Northern Cyprus
  - District: Girne District

Population (2011)
  - Total: 1,090
- Time zone: UTC+2 (EET)
  - Summer (DST): UTC+3 (EEST)

Templos (Greek: Τέμπλος, Turkish: Zeytinlik) is a Turkish Cypriot village in the Kyrenia District of Cyprus, two miles west of Kyrenia.

It is thought to be named after the Knights Templar, because during the Lusignan period it was one of their headquarters. It was later one of the commanderies of the Knights of St.John, when it had the name of Tembros (Ancient Greek: Τέμβρος). It was called Temros by its Turkish Cypriot inhabitants, but in 1975 its name was changed to Zeytinlik, meaning olive orchard.

During the British period it was inhabited almost wholly by Turkish Cypriots. In 1960 it had 222 inhabitants, of which 161 were Turkish Cypriot. This had grown to 796 in 2006 and 1,090 in 2011.

Since 1964 it has been under the de facto control of the Turkish Cypriot community of Cyprus, first as an enclave, then after the Turkish invasion of Cyprus in 1974 it was subsumed into the resulting Turkish sector of the island.
