= Agios Sergios, Cyprus =

Agios Sergios: Άγιος Σέργιος (Greek); Yeni Boğaziçi (Turkish)
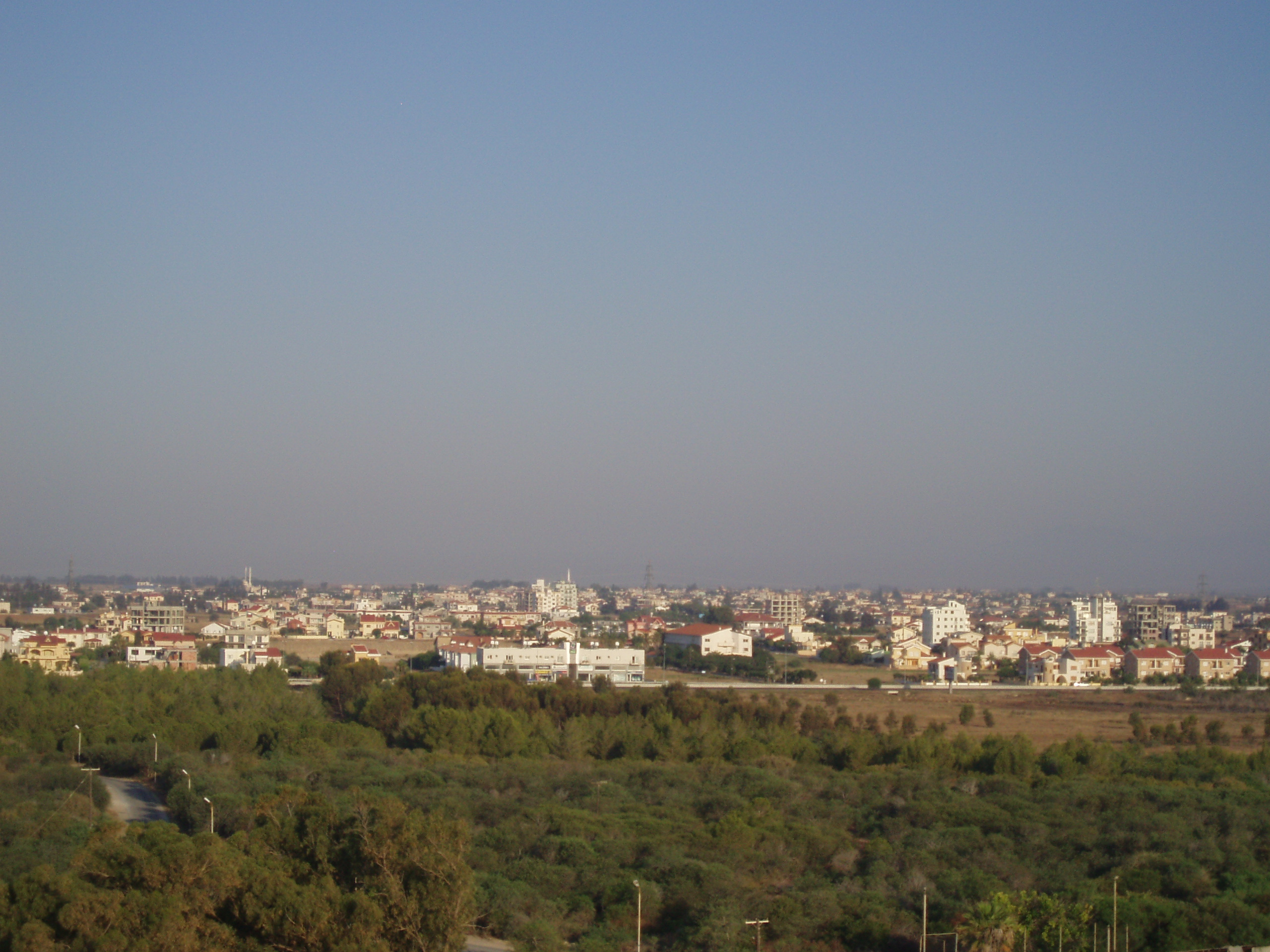

- Location within Cyprus
- Coordinates: 35°11′53″N 33°52′37″E
- Country (de jure): Cyprus
  - District: Famagusta District
- Country (de facto): Northern Cyprus
  - District: Gazimağusa District

Government
  - Mayor: Katip Demir

Population (2011)
  - Total: 3,347
  - Municipality: 6,618
- Website: www.ybbelediyesi.com

Agios Sergios (Greek: Άγιος Σέργιος "Saint Sergius"; Turkish: Yeni Boğaziçi "New Bosporus", previously Aysergi) is a large village in Cyprus, near the ancient site Salamis. Agios Sergios is de facto under Northern Cyprus since the Turkish invasion in Cyprus in 1974. The population of Agios Sergios before the Turkish invasion of Cyprus in 1974 was officially counted at 2,040 residents, according to the 1973 population census. This population consisted primarily of Greek Cypriots. All the Greek Cypriots have been forcibly expelled and rendered destitute refugees by Turkish invasion and Turkey until the time that this article is drafted, ignored repeated calls for respect for the human rights and property rights of displaced persons.

There are plenty of shops, restaurants and specialty stores throughout the village of Yeni Bogazici. A car is needed for most people because public transportation is severely lacking. Overall food and restaurant prices are inexpensive when compared to outside developed nations. The village is approximately 10 minutes from the city of Famagusta (Magusa) and minutes from numerous beaches for locals and tourists.

== Demographics ==
In 1946, 1,790 people were living in Agios Sergios; 82 were Turkish Cypriots and the rest Greek Cypriots. All Turkish Cypriots fled to Famagusta and neighbouring villages in 1958. By 1973, Agios Sergios had an estimated population of 2,040. After 1974, it was reinhabited by some of its former Turkish Cypriot residents, displaced Turkish Cypriots from the south of Cyprus, and Turkish settlers from Istanbul and Trabzon.

Summer is the high season in Cyprus. Population increases with expatriates during June, July and August in Yenibogazici. Most expatriates bring their family and friends from England, United States and Australia.

Land values and price increases for all consumer goods increase as a result of the expats and foreigners buying land and houses and relocating year round and/or only during the high season.

== International relations ==
In 2013, Yeni Boğaziçi became an international Cittaslow member, the first in the whole of Cyprus.

=== Twin towns – sister cities ===
Yeni Boğaziçi is twinned with:

- Altınova, Turkey
- Zabrat, Azerbaijan – since 2005
