= Yialousa =

Yialousa: Γιαλούσα (Greek); Yeni Erenköy (Turkish)
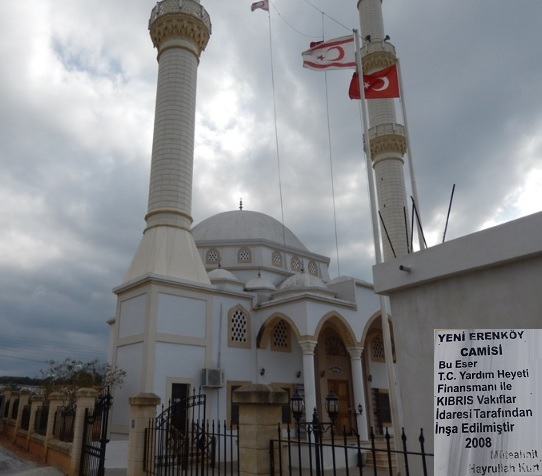
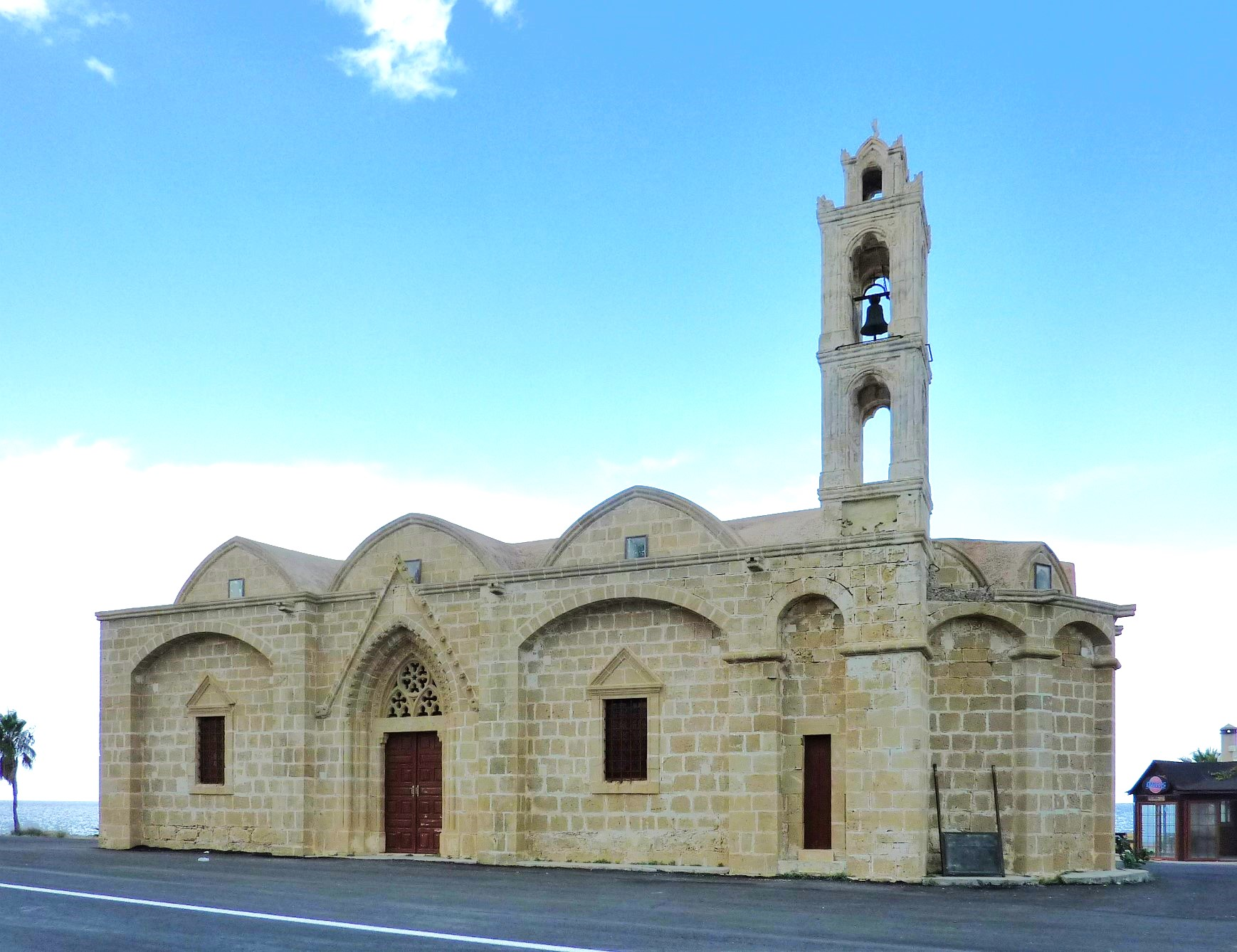
- Yeni Erenkoy Mosque (top); Ayios Therissos Church (bottom)

- Location within Cyprus
- Coordinates: 35°32′08″N 34°11′22″E
- Country (de jure): Cyprus
  - District: Famagusta District
- Country (de facto): Northern Cyprus
  - District: İskele District

Government
  - Mayor: Emrah Yesilirmak

Population (2011)
  - Total: 1,774
  - Municipality: 5,627
- Website: Yenierenkoy Turkish municipality

Yialousa (Greek: Γιαλούσα [from Αιγιαλούσα, meaning "Sea"]; Turkish: Yeni Erenköy) or Gialousa, is a town under the de facto control of Northern Cyprus, claimed by Cyprus. Yialousa is located on the Karpas Peninsula, and one of the sub-districts of the İskele District. In 2011, Yialousa had a population of 1,774.

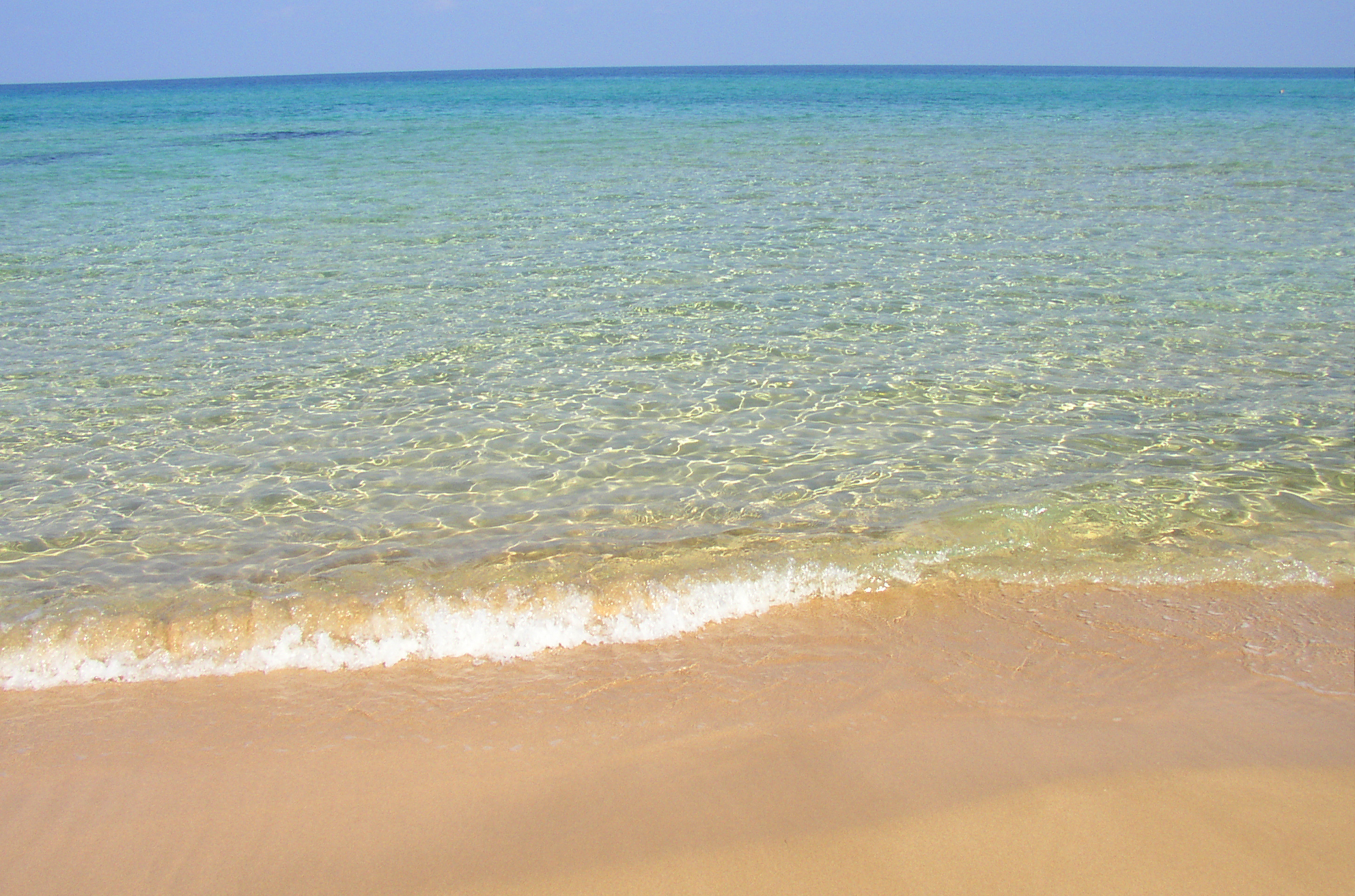
Municipal beach in Yialousa

In 1960, Yialousa had 2,538 inhabitants, only one of whom was a Turkish Cypriot, the rest being Greek Cypriot. By 1973, the population was 2,460, and composed of only Greek Cypriots. When the Turkish and Turkish Cypriot forces reached the town during the Turkish invasion of Cyprus in August 1974, the Greek inhabitants could not move to the south of the island, which was controlled by the Republic of Cyprus. Residents of the village were forcibly evicted by the Turkish army, whilst some left the village gradually because of restrictions on freedom of movement and education, and to reunite with family members who had been taken as prisoners and had ended up in the southern portion of the island after they were returned. In 1976, displaced Turkish Cypriots from the Kokkina exclave (Turkish Erenköy) were resettled in the village, and it was renamed "Yeni Erenköy" ("New Erenköy").

== International relations ==
=== Twin towns – sister cities ===
Yialousa is twinned with:

- Sincan, Ankara, Turkey
