= Mandria, Limassol =

Mandria Μανδριά
- Village
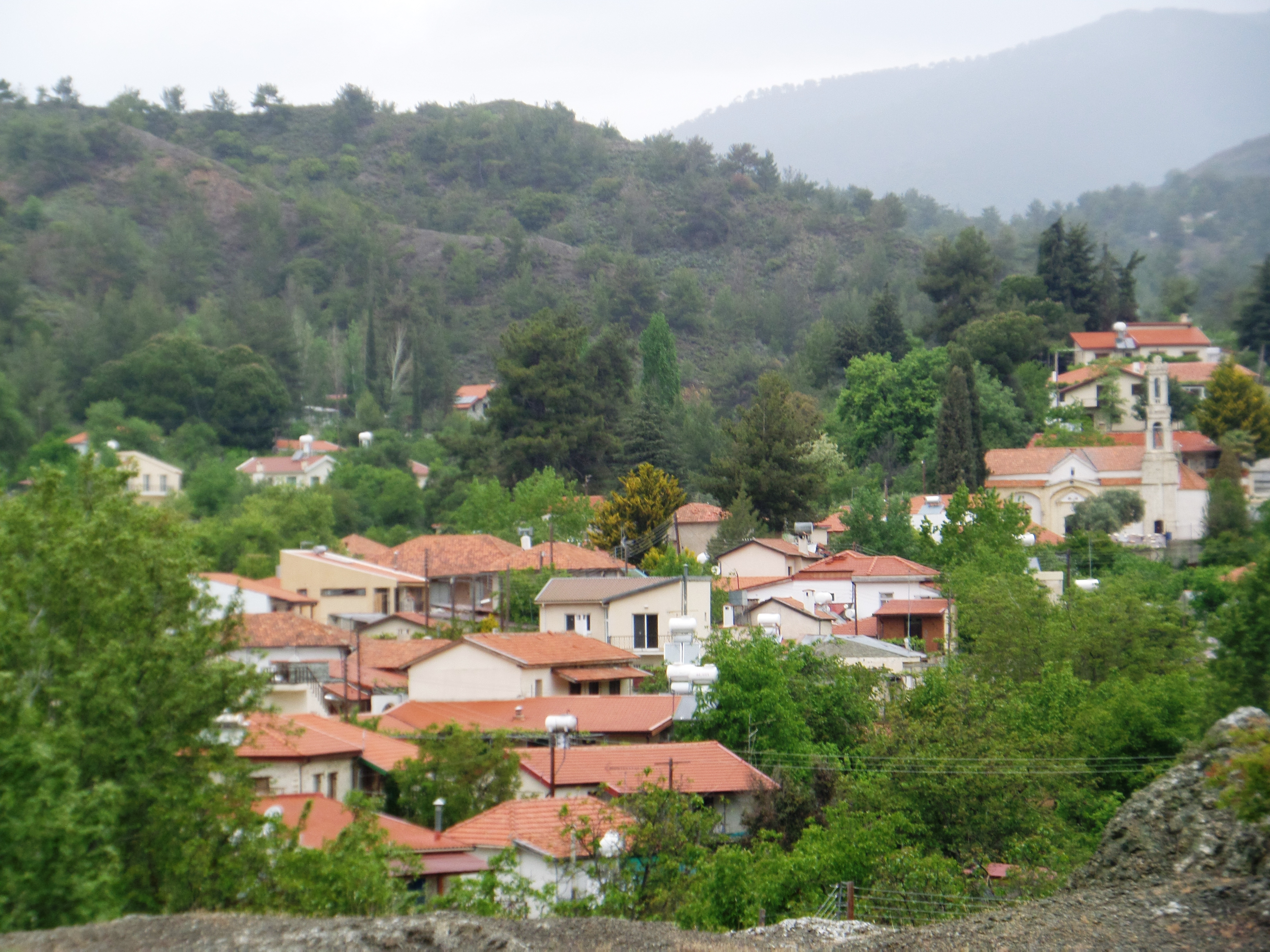

- Location in Cyprus
- Coordinates: 34°52′9″N 32°49′55″E
- Country: Cyprus
- District: Limassol District

Government
  - Body: Community Council of Mandria
  - President: Renos Moiseos
  - Vice President: Andreas Alkiviades

Population (2021)
  - Total: 117
- Time zone: UTC+2 (EET)
  - Summer (DST): UTC+3 (EEST)
- Website: mandria.org

Mandria (Greek: Μανδριά or Μαντριά) is a village in the Limassol District of Cyprus, located 4 km southwest of Pano Platres.
