= Palodeia =

Palodeia Παλόδεια Palodia, Palodheia, Palodhia
- Village
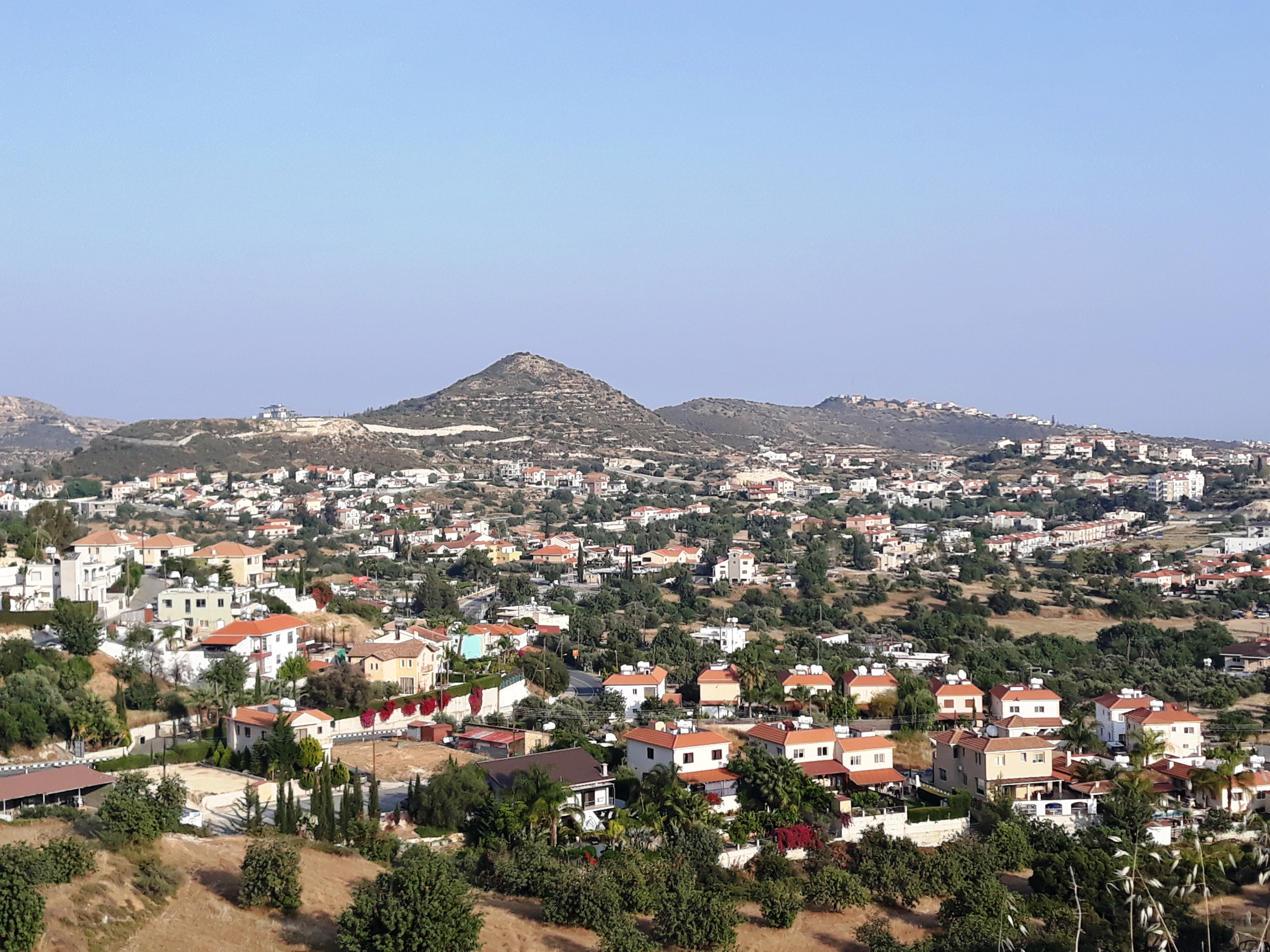

- Location in Cyprus
- Coordinates: 34°44′32″N 33°0′26″E
- Country: Cyprus
- District: Limassol District

Government
  - President of The Community Council: Yiannis Georgiou (since 2024)
- Elevation: 250 m (820 ft)

Population (2011)
  - Total: 1,568
- Time zone: UTC+2 (EET)
  - Summer (DST): UTC+3 (EEST)
- Postal code: 4549

Palodeia (Greek: Παλόδεια) is a village in the Limassol District of Cyprus, located 2 km south of Paramytha and 7 km north of the centre of Limassol. Although the original village is small, Palodeia includes much of the surrounding land which has gradually been suburbanized. This led to a rapid growth in population in the beginning of the 21st century; the population almost doubled from 730 in 2001 to 1568 in 2011. Among the features of interest are two churches and a nursing home for veterans of EOKA, the Melathron.
