= Mandria, Paphos =

Mandria Μανδριά
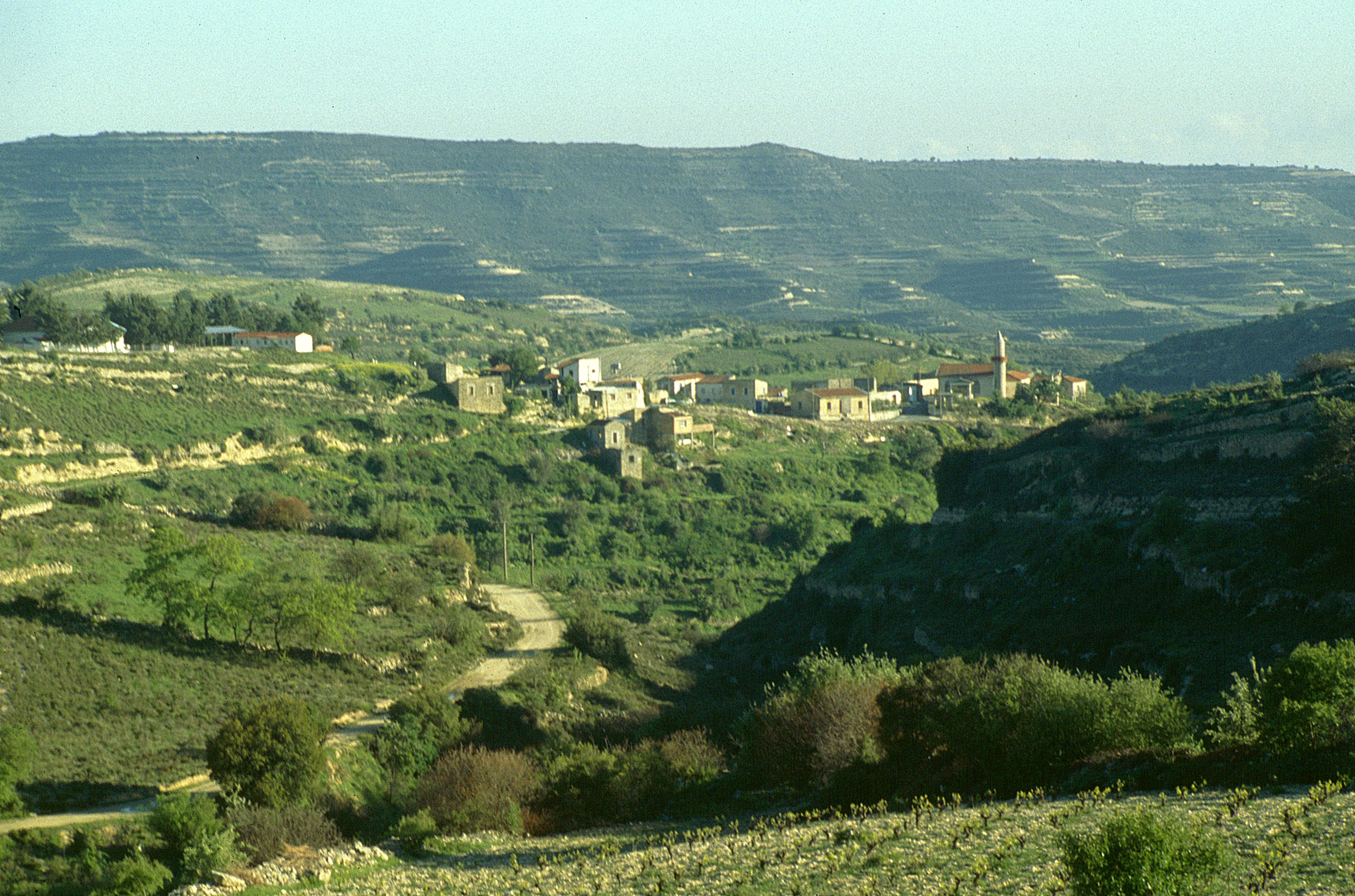

- Location in Cyprus
- Coordinates: 34°42′55″N 32°31′54″E
- Country: Cyprus
- District: Paphos District

Population (2001)
  - Total: 360
- Time zone: UTC+2 (EET)
  - Summer (DST): UTC+3 (EEST)
- Postal code: 8504

Mandria (Greek: Μανδριά, also spelled Μαντριά, Turkish: Yeşilova) is a village in the Paphos District of Cyprus, located 4 km from Paphos International Airport. Mandria is thought to have been founded around 500 years ago by Turkish Cypriots who originally called it 'green plain' ('Yeşilova').

== Sports ==
FC Mandria was founded in 2012 and plays in the 5th football league of Cyprus.

== Beaches ==
Mandria has 3 Beaches in its area

=== Main beach (Rocky shore) ===
This beach is approximately 3km long filled with rocks and a few sea shelf's. This beach is the only beach in Mandria that has a lifeguard tower and beach beds to relax on

=== Hidden beach (Nude beach) ===
On the east side of the village situated below cliffs is a small nude beach. The beach has multiple giant boulders that create small secluded beaches where people can sunbathe nude in peace and privacy.

=== Xeros beach ===
Located just west of the desalination plant. this beach is named after the now dried out river that used to flow down there
