= Güzelyurt District =

District of Northern Cyprus

Coordinates: 35.1981°N 32.9939°E

Location of Güzelyurt District within Northern Cyprus.

Güzelyurt District (Turkish: Güzelyurt İlçesi) is a district of Northern Cyprus. It consists only of the Güzelyurt sub-district. Its capital is Morphou, also known by its Turkish name, Güzelyurt. Its population was 30,590 in the 2011 census, but this included Lefka; with its current borders, its population was 18,946, constituting 6.6% of the population of Northern Cyprus. Its Governor is Menteş Gündüz.

Güzelyurt District was formed on 1 June 1998 via separation from Lefkoşa District. Lefke (Lefka) had been its second sub-district until 27 December 2016, when it was separated by a unanimous decision in the Assembly of the Republic to become the Lefke District, the sixth district of Northern Cyprus.
