= Lefke District =

District of Northern Cyprus

Location of Lefke District within Northern Cyprus.

Lefke District (Turkish: Lefke İlçesi) is a district of Northern Cyprus. Its capital is Lefka, also known by its Turkish name, Lefke. It had been a sub-district of the Güzelyurt District between 1998 (when that district was separated from the Lefkoşa District) and 27 December 2016. On 27 December 2016, the Assembly of the Republic unanimously voted to separate Lefke and make it the sixth district. Its population was recorded as 11,091 in the 2011 census, constituting 3.9% of the population of Northern Cyprus.

Erenköy (Kokkina) exclave is part of the district.
