= List of beaches in Northern Cyprus =

This is a list of beaches in Northern Cyprus.

== Karpass Peninsula ==
The Karpass Peninsula contains 46 sandy beaches, which are the nestling grounds for two species of sea turtles.

- Bafra Beach: at an area with 5-star hotels in Vokolida, but also open to general public with a facility operated by the municipality
- Golden Beach, also known as 'Pashi-Amos' (Fat Sand beach), or Nangomi: a large beach that is known as one of the finest in Cyprus and very little presence of human construction, near Rizokarpaso, in the Karpass National Park
- Kaplıca Beach: in Davlos, nesting grounds for sea turtles
- Rizokarpaso Public Beach: next to the Ayios Philon Church
- Seabird Beach: very close to Cape Apostolos Andreas
- Tatlısu Municipal Beach and surrounding sandy coves: in Akanthou, on the Northern Coastal Highway

== Kyrenia and surroundings ==
- Acapulco Beach: used by a 5-star hotel
- Alagadi Beach: famous for being a nestling ground for sea turtles, whose eggs can be observed as they hatch
- Camelot Beach: home to water sports
- Deniz Kızı Beach
- Dome Hotel Beach
- Escape Beach: also site of landing for the Turkish invasion of Cyprus, site of water sports
- Karakum Beach
- Kervansaray Beach
- Horse Nail Beach: near Livera, composed of small stones and site of diving and observation of marine life
- Mare Monte Beach: located at a small cove

== Famagusta and surroundings ==
- Bedi's Beach: 8 kilometres north of Famagusta, next to the ancient city of Salamis
- Boğaz Beach: next to a small fishing port, 25 kilometres north of Famagusta and on the way to the Karpass Peninsula
- Golden Bay Beach: north of Glapsides beach, home to the facilities of the Eastern Mediterranean University as well as caravans
- Glapsides Beach: a long beach around 5.5 kilometres north of Famagusta on the Famagusta-Karpass highway, home to water sports
- Koca Reis Beach: around 12 kilometres north of Famagusta
- Palm Beach: a popular beach for the locals at the city center of Famagusta, next to the ghost town of Varosha
- Park Hotel Beach: around 10 kilometres north of Famagusta, managed by a hotel
- Salamis Bay and Mimoza Hotel Beach: 12 kilometres north of Famagusta, home to water sports, managed by hotels

== Morphou and Lefka area ==
- Yeşilırmak Beach: in Limnitis
