= Roman Cyprus =

Roman province, 22 BC – 7th century AD

Provincia Cyprus Ἐπαρχία Κύπρου Eparchía Kýprou
- Province of the Roman Republic and Roman Empire
- 58 BC–688
- Capital: Nea Paphos
- Historical era: Classical Antiquity · Late Antiquity
  - Clash with Publius Clodius Pulcher and subsequent suicide of Ptolemaic King Ptolemy of Cyprus: 58 BC
  - Battle of Actium: 31 BC
  - Muslim conquest of Cyprus: c. 649–650
  - Condominium between Eastern Rome and the Caliphate by treaty: 688
Preceded by	Succeeded by
Ptolemaic Kingdom	Cyprus in the Middle Ages
- Today part of: Cyprus

Roman Cyprus was a small senatorial province of the Roman Empire. It possessed several well known religious sanctuaries and figured prominently in Eastern Mediterranean trade, particularly the production and trade of Cypriot copper. The island of Cyprus was situated at a strategically important position along Eastern Mediterranean trade routes, and had been controlled by various imperial powers throughout the first millennium BC, including the Assyrians, Egyptians, Persians, and Macedonians. Cyprus was annexed by the Romans in 58 BC, but turbulence and civil war in Roman politics did not establish firm rule in Cyprus until 31 BC when Roman political struggles were ended by the Battle of Actium. Cyprus was assigned the status of a senatorial province in 22 BC. From then until the 7th century AD, Cyprus was controlled by the Romans. Cyprus officially became part of the Eastern Roman Empire in 293 AD.

Under Roman rule, Cyprus was divided into four main districts, Salamis, Paphos, Amathus, and Lapethos. Nea Paphos was the capital of the island throughout the Roman period until Salamis was re-founded as Constantia in 346 AD. The geographer Ptolemy recorded the following Roman cities: Nea Paphos, Salamis, Amathus, Lapethos, Kition, Kourion, Arsinoe, Kyrenia, Chytri, Karpasia, Soli, and Tamassos, as well as some smaller cities scattered throughout the island.

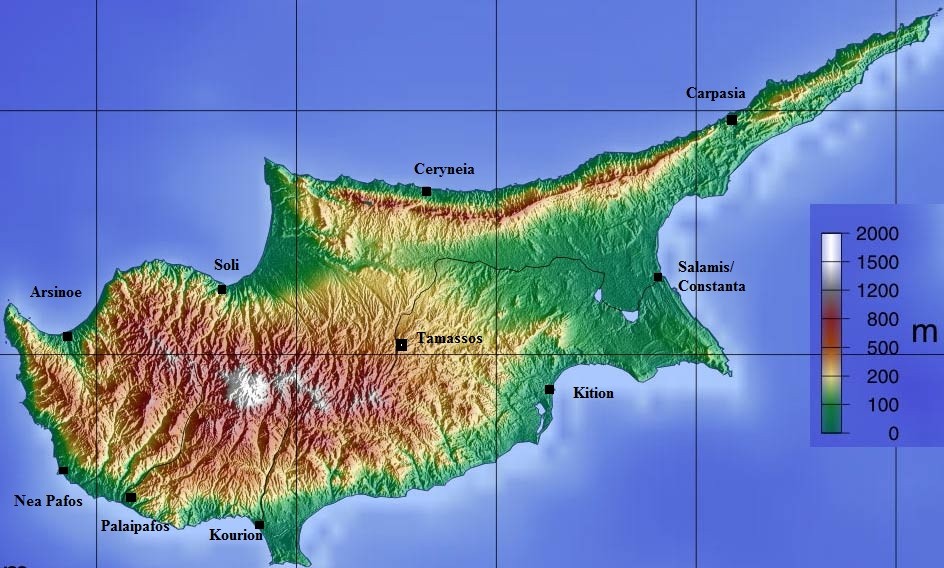
Topographical Map of Cyprus with Roman Cities

== Timeline ==
- 88 BC - Ptolemy X Alexander I bequeathes Egypt and Cyprus to the Roman Republic; the Romans choose not to act on this will and Cyprus passes to the next Ptolemaic heir.
- 88–58 BC - Reign of King Ptolemy of Cyprus
- 58 BC - Cato the Younger implemented the lex Clodia de Cypro making Cyprus part of the Roman province of Cilicia; Cato was proconsul of Cyprus from 58–56 BC.
- 52–51 BC - Cicero, becomes proconsul of Cilicia and Cyprus.
- 47 BC - Cyprus was restored under the Egyptian rule of Cleopatra.
- 31 BC - Battle of Actium, Marc Antony and Cleopatra were defeated by Augustus and Cyprus returns to Roman rule.
- 22 BC - Cyprus became a senatorial province separate from Cilicia with Nea Paphos as its capital.
- 21–12 BC - Cypriot calendar created in honor of Augustus and the imperial family.
- 18, 17 and 15 BC - Sizable earthquakes, the worst being in 15 BC which destroyed most of Paphos.
- 2 BC - Revisions were made to Cypriot calendar.
- 16 AD - Another large earthquake caused damage across the island.
- 45 AD - Christian mission of Paul and Barnabas throughout the island.
- 49 AD - Barnabas visited a second time.
- 65/66 AD - Kourion's Sanctuary of Apollo Hylates rebuilt after earthquake.
- 66 AD - Paphos was given the title Claudian.
- 70 AD - Destruction of Jerusalem and influx of Jews into Cyprus.
- 76/77 AD - Large-scale rebuilding after destructive earthquakes.
- 116 AD - Jewish Revolt at Salamis
- 269 AD - Brief Gothic Invasion
- 293 AD - Diocletian reorganizes the Roman Empire into East and West regions; Cyprus falls under the East.
- 342 AD - Salamis and Paphos were destroyed by a massive earthquake.
- 346 AD - Salamis was refounded as Constantia, the capital of Cyprus.
- 365 AD - Earthquake destroyed Kourion.

== Roman conquest of Cyprus ==
Cyprus had been a part of the Ptolemaic Kingdom prior to becoming a Roman province. Ptolemy X Alexander I bequeathed his kingdom, which at the time included Egypt and Cyprus, to the Roman Republic upon his death in 88 BC. However, the Roman Senate was reluctant to accept the kingdom as it was feared that whoever was sent to conquer the Ptolemaic Kingdom might become too powerful and threaten the democratic principles of the republic. From 88 to 58 BC, Cyprus was ruled by King Ptolemy, son of the King of Egypt, Ptolemy IX Soter, who had succeeded Ptolemy X. After Ptolemy refused to put up ransom when Publius Clodius Pulcher was kidnapped by Cilician pirates, Pulcher accused the king of colluding with pirates. This accusation provided a pretext for the annexation of Cyprus by the Roman Republic. The lex Clodia de Cypro was passed by the plebeian council in 58 BC and Cato the Younger was sent to annex Cyprus and serve as its new governor. Cato sent envoys ahead to offer Ptolemy the distinctive position of the High Priest at the Sanctuary of Aphrodite in Palaepaphos but Ptolemy refused and instead killed himself.

Cyprus was abruptly annexed by Rome and Cyprus was added to the Roman province of Cilicia. Cato sold much of the royal possessions and brought back 7,000 talents to Rome after taking his share of the profits. During this time Cyprus was exploited by the Roman rulers who saw positions in the provinces as a stepping stone in Roman politics.

In 51 BC Cicero was made proconsul in Cilicia, which included Cyprus. His proconsulship was sympathetic to the Cypriots. However, by the end of his proconsulship Rome was engulfed in Caesar's civil war. In 47 BC, after coming to the aid of Cleopatra of Egypt in a civil war against her brother Ptolemy XIII, Julius Caesar agreed to return control of Cyprus to the Ptolemaic Kingdom. Caesar appointed Cleopatra's younger siblings Arsinoe IV and Ptolemy XIV as joint rulers of Cyprus.

Mark Antony and Octavian were struggling for power after Julius Caesar's death and, in 40 BC, Antony reaffirmed that Cleopatra was ruler of Cyprus at the Donations of Alexandria. The Battle of Actium in 31 BC marked the end of the War of Actium, resulting in Octavian gaining control of all of Egypt and Cyprus. Cyprus was left under control of Octavian's legate until it could be further dealt with. In 22 BC Cyprus was separated from the Cilicia and became a senatorial province without a standing army.

== Overview ==
Cyprus was divided into four regions with thirteen known cities with Nea Paphos becoming the capital. Cyprus was allowed a large amount of autonomy remaining mainly Greek in culture while adopting and adapting Roman customs. No Roman colonies were established on the island. During this time period there are very few primary literary sources that mention Cyprus, let alone provide a detailed history. However, epigraphic and archaeological evidence indicates thriving economic, culture and civic life in Cyprus throughout the Roman period.

In 45 AD Saint Paul and Saint Barnabas visited Cyprus as part of Paul's first missionary journey to convert people to Christianity. Barnabas returned for a second visit in 49 AD but the spread of Christianity was slow, especially in the rural areas. After the destruction of Jerusalem in 70 AD by Emperor Vespasian, and his son Titus there was a large influx of Jewish refugees into Cyprus. In 115–117 AD a widespread Jewish revolt (Kitos War) resulted in tens of thousands of deaths in Cyprus and around the eastern empire and in the expulsion of Jews from Cyprus. In 269 AD there was a brief Gothic invasion (Battle of Naissus) throughout the eastern empire including Cyprus. In 293 AD Cyprus became part of the Eastern Empire as the Roman Empire was divided under the Diocletianic reforms.

=== Roman military on Cyprus ===
There was very little significant Roman military presence on Cyprus, with the exception of two notable incidents; a local council was barricaded into their own council house by an equestrian troop and the Jewish massacre at Salamis which required outside military intervention. The proconsul had a legatus subordinate, which points to at least a token military presence, but there is almost no evidence of there being anything larger than the praetorian bodyguards on the island.

Every province of the Roman Empire was required to send men to fill the ranks of the Roman army as conscripts and Cyprus was no exception. The Cypriots contributed some 2,000 men to the foreign auxilia at any one time, but there are no notable military figures from Cyprus. There were two cohorts of auxiliary troops that performed well enough to be given the honor of citizenship before their 25 years of service was up, but other than those there is no other known outstanding Cypriot units.

=== Roman administrative system ===
The Roman administrative system was also fairly light; it seems that only unfavored citizens were sent to govern the island. The basic structure consisted of a proconsul at the top representing the Roman Senate and the emperor with two assistants in the form of a legatus and a quaestor. The proconsul had several duties, including:

- High court judicial duties; if the magistrate and the local council couldn't rule on it, it was brought to the proconsul
- Investing the high priest (of the imperial cult) with his power as the representative for the emperor
- Consecrating imperial statues and buildings in the name of the emperor
- Promoting public and civic (construction) works such as aqueducts, roads, and centers of entertainment (such as theaters)
- Deciding on funding for "extravagant projects" such as honorary equestrian statues or repaving sanctuaries
- Responsible for the internal security of the island

The Cypriots were essentially peaceful; there is no mention of outlaws needing to be dealt with or crimes severe enough to need police intervention, there was no real policing force on the island for the proconsul to oversee. The closest thing to a police force was a hipparch in office in Soli under Hadrian's rule, but this seems to have been a temporary situation.

Under the proconsul and the legate were the local councils; these were led by archons who were elected annually from among the members of the council. There were several other positions associated with the councils, but they were all local officials and not directly part of the Roman administrative structure.

The quaestor handled tax collection on the island; he had a board of ten Cypriots in each city to help him with his duties. In addition to this force, there were publicani who would bid for the right to collect taxes in each region.

The terms of office for the proconsul and the legate were staggered with that of the quaestor, that is to say the proconsul and the legate would see the last six months of the old quaestor's term and the first six months of the new one's term.

=== List of governors ===
This is a list of governors of Roman Cyprus, compiled from known inscriptions and surviving texts both literary and documentary. Until the reign of Diocletian, Cyprus was governed by a pro praetor with proconsular authority.

Date	Name
Before 16 BC	Lucius Tarius Rufus
Before 1 BC	Aulus Plautius
Between 31 BC and 14 AD	P. Paquius Scaeva
Between 22 BC and 14 AD	Aulus Didius Postumus
Before 14 AD	M. Vehilius
Before c. 40	Gaius Ummidius Durmius Quadratus
After 29	L. Axius Naso
Between 14 and 37	M. Verg[ilius ?]
Between 14 and 37	C. Lucretius Rufus
42/43	T. Cominius Proculus
46/48	Sergius Paulus
Middle 1st century	Titius Clodius Eprius Marcellus
65	Q. Julius Cordus
66	Lucius Annius Bassus
Middle 1st century	L. Vilius
Middle 1st century	Vilius Milionius
79/80	[... Ma]rcius [...]tesinus
80/81	Lucius Bruttius Maximus
81/82	L. Plotius P[...]
between 70 and 95	L. Pontius
100/101	Quintus Laberius Justus Cocceius Lepidus
101/102	Quintus Caelius Honoratus
113/114	Quintus Seppius Celer Marcus Titius Sassius Candidus
115/116 or 116/117	[...]gius Pate[rnus ?]
122/123	Gaius Calpurnius Flaccus
125/126	Paulus
Between 118 and 138	Tiberius Claudius Juncus
1st half of 2nd century	Publius Cassius Longinus
Between 138 and 180	Tiberius Claudius Flavianus Titianus Quintus Vilius Proclus Lucius Marcius Celer Marcus Calpurnius Longus
c. 196/197	? D. Plautius Felix Julianus
197/198	Tiberius Claudius Subatianus Proculus
198/199	Audius Bassus
c. 200	Appianus
Between 193 and 211	T. Caesernius Stati[a]nus [Quinc]tianus
c. 217	(C.) Julius Avitus (Alexianus)
Between 193 and 217	? Sex. Clodius [...]nianus
217/218	Tiberius Claudius Attalus Paterculianus
3rd century	Poblicola Priscus
3rd century	Theodorus
Unknown	L. Coelius Tarphinus

== Economy and trade ==
=== Economy ===
The Roman period was one of the most prosperous in Cyprus's history. Evidence of luxury items acquired through trade, impressively large administrative buildings in cities like Salamis, and richly decorated mansion homes like those found in Nea Paphos point to a thriving economy. The island was mostly self-sufficient and prospered through the utilization and trade of natural resources. After the Romans annexed Cyprus in 58 BC, it entered a period of production and widespread trade facilitated by the Pax Romana. This is shown in the archaeological evidence of the coastal cities flourishing, Cypriot markets in Syria and Palestine, and extensive coin circulation.

The city was the basic economic unit of the Roman Empire; it could interact with its surrounding agricultural hinterland in one of two ways. In the first, a sort of symbiotic relationship, the city would act as a redistribution center and manufactured goods needed by the agricultural area supporting it. In the second, a more parasitic relationship, the city center would redistribute agricultural surplus while manufacturing goods to be sold or traded with other centers. The role of the city was determined by its proximity to an important trade route. The major coastal cities of Cyprus which showed this kind of economic growth were Paphos, Amathus, and Salamis.

The Roman emphasis on the importance of cities was indicated by its dedication to constructing a network of roads. Cyprus's first Roman roads were funded by the Emperor, but by the time of the Severan dynasty the island had grown rich enough to finance its own construction.

The great wealth of Cyprus came from its vast system of trade. Cypriot trade economy was based on resources of the island: wine, oil, grain, copper, minerals, timber, glass, and shipbuilding. With the port cities acting as distribution centers, Cyprus had connections with other locations across the Mediterranean, and seafaring was an important aspect of daily life and culture. The extent of trade can be proven archaeologically through the wide array of foreign items found on the island, particularly coins. The Romans introduced walnut trees to Cyprus to further enhance the economy

Despite the destruction caused by six earthquakes that wracked the island in the Roman period, the Cypriot economy remained relatively steady. The role of the port cities in trade were crucial to the Roman administration; after an earthquake in AD 76 destroyed the city of Kourion, Rome sent immense amounts of funding to rebuild the city, as evidenced by a large influx of coins in the following year.

=== Roads ===
Ancient roads can be studied through literary, epigraphic (e.g. milestones), topographical, and archaeological evidence. The division of Cyprus into two, the buffer zone and military occupied areas make many parts of the island unavailable for study. It is estimated that 10% of the island is inaccessible for various reasons. Studying the Roman road system and its milestones helps in partially establishing the boundaries of territories in Cyprus.

There are several sources that can be used to get information about Cyprus' ancient roads. The Geographica of Strabo (23 AD) gives several distances and mentions the highway between Palaiaphos and Nea Paphos. Pliny the Elder, in Natural History (77–79 AD) talks about the size of Cyprus and lists fifteen cities, including three that are no longer extant.

The Tabula Peutingeriana (Peutinger Table) is a 13th-century AD copy of an older map of Roman Cyprus. The exact date of the original Peutinger Table is unknown, but is estimated to be from the 2nd to 4th century BC. It is an illustrated version of an itinerary, which is a list of notable places with descriptions and the distances between each place. The map is distorted, north-south is compressed and east-west is stretched out. The roads on Cyprus are shown as an oval which is bisected by a diagonal section of the road. No other roads are depicted.

The Geography of Ptolemy also talks about Cyprus but the accuracy of this information varies for different areas of Cyprus. For example, some distances are overestimated, underestimated, or come very close to reality. Ptolemy doesn't mention any roads. Another map is the Kitchener map (1885). It is useful because it helps to distinguish older roads from twentieth century roads.

There are also travellers' reports and local informants. Claude D. Cobham compiled travellers' reports and descriptions in Excepta Cypria (1918). There are also the works of Luigi de Palma Cesnola and D. G. Hogarth, both of whom used local informants. Their works are useful because it has information about Cyprus during its late Ottoman stage, before the British changed anything.

Milestones are an important source because they give route information and they can be dated. Thirty Roman milestones have been found and recorded. Most of them were in mountainous regions and all are located in the coastal highway circling the island. In other areas of the island, where building materials were scarce, milestones were reused. Milestone inscriptions included the mileage and the names and titles of the rulers that contributed to the milestone placement. From these inscriptions other types of information can be inferred. For example, it is known that the major road along the southern coast was a part of the imperial network. Mitford uses the inscriptions to describe the emperors' and other government involvement in the roads. He says that three phases of the Roman Cyprus road network emerges from the inscriptions. First, Augustus and Titus are the self-proclaimed creators of the road system. Second, in the Severan period the responsibility of road repairs was given to cities while the proconsul coordinated their activities. The third phase was a century and a half of stagnation and milestones were reused for imperial propaganda or to express loyalty.

Before the Roman period Cyprus already had a system of main roads and during Roman rule secondary roads were added. The roads in Cyprus often did not meet Roman standards and preexisting roads were not changed to meet them. Although, milestone inscriptions indicate renovations in 198 AD, at least in western Cyprus. During the Severan period road maintenance was a civic duty. Throughout the Roman period it is uncertain if the central government paid for the roads completely or shared the costs with nearby cities.

Informal cross-country roads were used in addition to the formal roads. The roads converged on the main economic center, Salamis. Along with the main roads, minor roads radiated from a city. This layout shows the influence of economic forces in creating roads. These minor roads connected the surrounding areas to the urban market. There were also the benefits of ensuring the import of food into cities, thus reducing the risk of famine.

=== Coinage ===
Although the minting and circulation of Cypriot coins has not yet been exhaustively studied, there is sufficient evidence to show widespread trade routes and interaction with other cultures in the Roman world. There are two main types of evidence in coinage: coins minted in or for Cyprus, and all coins circulating within the province during Roman times. After 30 BC the nature of coinage became more "Romanized"; coin type and manufacture did not remain static over time, and styles and imagery of coins changed frequently. Provincial coins were minted at Paphos and Salamis, as well as "regal" coins specific to each reigning emperor. The League of Free Laconians was responsible for the coinage, as well as the emperor cult and organization of festivals.

=== Copper ===
Copper mining in Cyprus has an extensive history which flourished in the Bronze Age. The extent of copper mining in the Roman period was scaled down significantly, and was under direct imperial control. The three important cities that continued copper mining in the classical period were Amathus, Tamassos, and Soli. The well-preserved mining site located near Soli was Skouriotissa, which contains chalcopyrite deposits that were extensively mined during Roman period. Recent analysis and location of slag heaps from Roman mines suggests a shift in the social organization of mining in classical times. Some slag heaps were located almost 3.2 km (2 mi) away from the mining location suggesting that the copper workers transported the copper ore away from the mines before they smelted the copper to work with it. This is a significant change from earlier mining settlements in which the copper was melted on site or very near the place where it was extracted.

== Religion and social history ==
=== Koinon ===
To maintain some degree of autonomy after control of the island shifted to the Roman Empire, the various cities of Cyprus maintained a collective administrative body that reflected Hellenistic values introduced by the Ptolemaic dynasty at the end of the 4th century. Under the Ptolemies, the cities of Cyprus were allowed a degree of autonomy that was unfamiliar and somewhat unexpected. To maintain solidarity throughout the kingdom, the cities formed parliamentary committees with each other. Though the resulting confederation of Cypriot cities does not have an exact date of origin, the term koinon—meaning "common"—began to appear on inscriptions around the middle of the 2nd century BC Little is known about the exact function of the koinon, though it seems to have been grounded in religion due to its initial associations with religious festivals at the Temple of Aphrodite in Palaiaphos. The large number of people that gathered at the temple likely realized a need for religious unity amongst them; thus, the koinon was formed to coordinate pancyprian religious festivals. Soon, the meetings of the koinon began to stray from strictly religious matters and focus more on the social and political aspects of the country, including unifying the various districts and cities in terms of political representation. These assumptions are based on inscriptions on statues and other dedicatory epigraphical evidence around the island that implies that the koinon had a presence all over Cyprus, as well as the money and influence to affect many different cities. Thus, the purpose of the koinon shifted from autonomous parliamentary committees during the Hellenistic period to a religiously motivated pancyprian political body. The administrative privileges of the koinon, by the end of the Roman period, included minting its own coins, participating in political relations with Rome, and bestowing honorary distinctions upon notable individuals. Inscriptions on statues, as previously mentioned, attest to this final function and indicate the fact that the koinon was most likely a funded organization which received its dues in the form of an annual contribution from each city. The koinon therefore maintained a great deal of power because it essentially controlled all forms of religion on Cyprus. This power is later utilized to deify some of the Roman emperors. Known evidence in the form of inscriptions and dedications indicates with certainty that the emperors Augustus, Caracalla, Titus, Tiberius, Trajan, Vespasian, Claudius, Nero, and Septimius Severus and his succeeding dynasty all formed imperial cults that were represented on Cyprus.

=== Religion and imperial cults ===
Around the middle of the 4th century BC, a new ruling dynasty—the Ptolemies—gained power over Cyprus and established an imperial cult over the existing religions on the island. This imperial cult put the king at the head of religious observance on the island, and dictated that he was on an equal footing with other gods. To the average citizen, the king was considered a direct representative or descendant of the gods. The king maintained control over the koinon, an administrative body founded by the various cities scattered across Cyprus for the purpose of coordinating religious activities and festivals. The imperial cult continued to exist throughout Roman occupation of Cyprus, and a number of unique cults emerged from this transition to the Roman period.

After Augustus gained control of Rome—and Cyprus with it—the island's inhabitants seemed perfectly willing to accept the divinity of the new emperor. Much of the information about Roman religion on the island comes from five sources; ancient literature, Cypriot numismatics, excavations and archaeological work, epigraphy, and burials. Through an analysis of these sources, where appropriate, scholars have been able to come up with an idea of how Roman involvement affected Cypriot religion.

One example of epigraphy that illustrates the Roman imperial cult is found on a white marble slab that originated from the Sanctuary of Aphrodite at Palaiaphos. Essentially, this text contains an oath of obedience that the priests at the temple would be forced to abide by. The oath invokes the names of the Roman gods in a manner that suggests that the ruler—in this case Emperor Tiberius—is comparable or equal to the pantheon of other gods. Each god and goddess named represents a different region of Cyprus; thus, the tablet is basically confirming the entire island's allegiance to the Roman Empire. The tablet leaves little doubt that future generations must continue to support the emperor and his family in all regards. Evidence of imperial cult through inscriptions can be found as far back as the earliest Ptolemaic rulers, and continue until 391 AD, when the Roman emperor Theodosius I outlawed all pagan worship in the empire.

The Temple of Aphrodite at Palaiaphos retained its religious importance to the island even after the founding of Nea Paphos at the dawn of the Hellenistic period. Ancient literary sources say that men and women from all over the island would walk from Nea Paphos to Palaiaphos as part of a religious ceremony honoring Aphrodite. It seems that the importance of this religious festival helped maintain the status of the city throughout the Roman period.

The importance of the cult of Aphrodite is unquestionable, along with its wealth. For this reason, the high priest at Palaiaphos was granted far more power than his involvement in mere religious functions; instead, the priesthood became more like a theocracy. Evidence from inscriptions suggests that the high priest may have had a hand in all religious matters across the island.

The temple at Palaiaphos was the leading center for the imperial cult. At the beginning of the 3rd century AD, a statue of Emperor Caracalla was consecrated at Paphos. In the year proceeding, a second statue of the Emperor was erected, this time at Palaiaphos. Inscriptions at the old city suggest that aside from Aphrodite, only Caracalla was worshiped there. Even at the new city, worship was reserved to only a few gods and the Emperor. These gods were most likely Zeus Polieus, Aphrodite, and Hera, while the Emperor was worshiped down to the end of the Severan dynasty, Septimius Severus was the final emperor who enforced the imperial cult. Beginning with Augustus in the early first century, Paphos welcomed the emperor as a living god, and inscriptions prove the promised fidelity of the inhabitants of not only Paphos, but all of Cyprus to the new emperor.

Despite seeming reluctant to acquire the title, Augustus, was treated as a god on Cyprus. Even his daughter, Julia, and his wife, Livia, became "the Goddess Augusta and the Goddess the New Aphrodite", respectively. It seems that there was no shortage of priests and other religious figures more than willing to acknowledge the Emperor's divinity in exchange for recognition from Rome. Titles began to be conferred between Rome and the priesthood to solidify each other's right to authority. As previously mentioned, the main method by which the imperial cult ordained its members was through an oath of allegiance to the emperor. Many statues and other monuments were erected in nearly all of the cities of Cyprus; for instance, a statue of Emperor Vespasian was erected in Salamis by the gymnasiarchs there, but was consecrated by a religious figure. This monument reinforces the idea that there was a strong connection between the activities of the state and the pagan cults.

A number of other pagan cults are known to have existed across the island, centered primarily around the major cities. These cities usually had large temples that were dedicated to a specific patron god of the city: in Amathus as in Palaiaphos, Aphrodite had her own cult; in Salamis, Zeus Olympius; Paphos contained cults for the gods Asclepius, Hygieia, and Apollo; in Curium, Apollo Hylates. Though these are only a few examples of the numerous cults, many gods had temples and dedications in many different locations, but not every god was represented. Because Aphrodite is said to have been born from sea foam around Cyprus, she appears to be consistently worshiped across the island, as evidenced by recurring temples dedicated in her honor. For each of these cults, the method of worship was different; it is hard to say with certainty what each temple did specifically, but numismatic evidence and literary records show that the cult of Aphrodite likely involved prostitution but not blood sacrifice of animals. It is assumed that a majority of these cults followed similar worship services to those found in the corresponding temples in Rome and other locations around the empire. Despite this assumption, there does not seem to be much evidence to pinpoint specific details surrounding the cult procedures.

While the Roman imperial cult maintained significance up until the late 4th century, the ancient pantheon of gods slowly faded out of existence along the way. Following Caracalla's death in 217 AD, inscriptions have nothing more to say about cults such as the Paphian Aphrodite, the Zeus of Salamis, or the Apollo of Hyle at Curium. Each of these cults had enjoyed a long and prosperous history on the island, and, like the imperial cult, seemed to disappear rather suddenly around the 3rd and 4th centuries—the period of Severan rule. All across the island, both imperial cult and the traditional gods began to lack the necessary power to sustain religious faith; after the Roman period, the citizens of Cyprus began to turn to newer, more private gods that were easily accessible and suited to the needs of the individual.

=== Jewish Revolt ===
Under the reign of Ptolemy I, there was a large exodus of Jews from Palestine to other areas of the Mediterranean. Their increasing presence on Cyprus most likely occurred due to the destruction of the Temple of Jerusalem in 70 AD. A large proportion of the Cypriot population, the Jews were also strongly involved in the copper industry. As noted by inscriptions on the construction of a local synagogue, the community of Jews were also possibly on the island to supply wine for the services at the Temple of Jerusalem. With years of building tension with the Romans, in 116 AD, during the reign of Trajan, the Jews revolted at Salamis, as well as in Egypt and Cyrene. The most destruction however occurred at Salamis, where there were no stationed Roman garrisons or troops. Led by Artemion, it is estimated that over 240,000 died in the revolt. Detailed by the writings of Cassius Dio, the Jews brutally massacred every non-Jew in the city. The revolt was quickly quelled by the Roman General Lusius Quietus. All Jews were permanently expelled from the island and even those that were driven there by storm were executed immediately. Although archaeological evidence suggests that in later centuries the Jewish community was re-established.

=== Introduction and spread of Christianity ===
In 45 AD, Saint Paul went on his first missionary journey to Cyprus with Saint Barnabas (a native Cypriot Jew), and John Mark. Starting at Antioch, they traveled to the port of Seleucia and onwards to Salamis to preach Christianity. As noted in the Acts of the Apostles 13:1–14:27, on their journey to Paphos, Paul and Barnabas encountered the Roman Proconsul Sergius Paulus and a Jewish sorcerer, Elymas. Upon hearing Paul's words, Elymas was temporarily blinded, and this act convinced Sergius Paulus to convert to Christianity, the first Roman governor to do so.

After a quarrel with Paul, Barnabas and John Mark traveled back to Cyprus on their second missionary journey. Whilst preaching at Salamis, Barnabas was murdered by a group of Jews. According to tradition, John Mark buried him with a copy of the gospel of St. Matthew, which Barnabas always carried with him. However, Matthew's gospel was most likely written between 80–85 AD. Therefore, it is impossible for Barnabas to have had a copy of Matthew since he would not have been alive when it was produced.

=== Major basilicas and churches ===
The ancient village of Kopetra in the Vasilikos valley contains the remains of three churches dating to the Late Roman period. The first, a small basilica located at the site of Sirmata, dates to around the beginning of the 7th century. The basilica contains a crypt with two tombs. The construction styles of the tombs suggest the second was added later, around the middle of the 7th century. The central courtyard of the basilica was surrounded on three sides by rooms which may have served as domestic spaces for the religious community living there. A cistern had also been cut into one corner of the courtyard. The basilica was close to and yet separate from the nearby village, reflecting the spirit of monasticism in early Christianity. The second church, which was located to the south of Kopetra, was similar in design and proportions to the Sirmata basilica. The remains of a mosaic floor have been found in the sanctuary, although the original subject is unknown. The third and largest of the three churches is northeast of Kopetra. The architectural style is similar to the other two Kopetra churches, yet reflects many characteristics of churches built across the island during the 5th and 6th centuries. The dome covering the sanctuary once held a colorful glass mosaic. All three churches were likely maintained and used until they were abandoned some time in the 7th century.

The basilica of Kourion was built over the remains of the buildings destroyed in the earthquake of 365 AD. Although its proportions were a little longer than other examples, the basilica was internally similar in architecture to other 5th-century churches and basilicas. The ruined buildings provided all the limestone, granite, and marble needed to build the new church. Remains of a mosaic between the windows in the sanctuary have been found among the ruins. A well-preserved mosaic belonging to one of the previous buildings has been found beneath the floor of the diakonikon. A total of forty inscriptions have been found in and around the basilica, although most remain only in fragments and were only preserved by the reuse of materials after the basilica was abandoned. The earliest inscription dates from the 3rd century BC, during the reign of Ptolemy II Philadelphos. The inscriptions dating to the Roman period on Cyprus include one honoring the proconsul Julianus, and another which mentions the gymnasium of Kourion. The basilica was destroyed by an earthquake in the 7th century. Remains suggest that the building was not immediately abandoned, but was still used until the 8th century.

The Late Roman site of Maroni Petrera is located along the south coast of Cyprus in the Maroni Valley near the modern village of Maroni. The remains of a church have been uncovered at this site as part of the Maroni Valley Archaeological Survey Project founded in 1990. The Petrera church was the religious center for the Maroni valley, yet archaeological evidence of a complex of rooms and courtyards separate from the church indicate that the site was also associated with storage and agricultural production. Recovered remains indicate that the decoration of the church was relatively plain; there is almost no evidence of mosaics, wall-paintings, or the use of marble. Otherwise, the Petrera church was architecturally similar to contemporary Christian buildings in Cyprus and the Eastern Mediterranean.

=== Roman Cypriot burials ===
Burial customs are typically slow to change, even during times of social transition and foreign influence. Burial customs on Cyprus during the Hellenistic period were largely retained during the Roman period. Nevertheless, the study of these customs can still provide a great deal of insight into who was living in Cyprus at the time and the extent of their influence.

The tombs of Roman Cyprus typically were cave-like chambers with sloping dromos, the ends of which were sealed with earth and occasionally with stone. The number, size, and ornamentation of these chambers in differed according to wealth, ethnicity, and the dates of construction. Multiple burials, in which all members of a family shared a tomb, continued to be popular into the Roman period. The typical burial chamber was an elongated rectangle, with side niches or accompanying chambers. Loculi, or rectangular bed-like areas for the dead, were often attached to the chambers, radiating in a symmetrical fashion. Plaques next to loculi with inscriptions of the names of the dead or proverbs in honor of the dead were not uncommon. Epitaphs containing ethnic adjectives, or titles indicating rank or status, have proved helpful in determining the context of certain burials. Identification of the dead was also located on cippi, located directly above the tomb. Cippi are carved-stone altars comprising a base, a narrow shaft, and a cap. Inscriptions labeling the tombs were made on the shafts of the cippi, and other forms of ornamentation (such as foliage) were common. The living could honor their dead by placing flowers on the cippus or pouring libations on the cippus. Gifts continued to be incorporated into burial, as seen in early period of Cypriot history. Jewelry, imported Roman pottery, local imitation pottery, gold wreaths, and glass were common burial gifts. Mummy portraits, depicting the deceased wearing gold wreaths and busts or stelae of the dead, began to emerge as a result of Alexandrian influence. Lamps, cookware, and libation vessels have been excavated in these tombs, suggesting the continuation of funerary feasts of the living during the Roman period.

Tomb structures that are unique or scarcely located are assumed to be those of the elite, or foreign. Uncommon burial practices that occurred during Roman Cyprus included cremation, tumulus tombs, sarcophagi, and peristyle tombs. A multitude of tombs in Nea Paphos, excavated by M. Markides in 1915, represent Peristyle tombs. Peristyle tombs typically had a long, stepped dromos, a long rectangular vaulted room with radiating loculi, and several minor chambers (one located directly behind the other). These are attributed to either Egyptian-born individuals, or Cypriot elite who wished to be buried in the Alexandrian fashion, because Nea Paphos was a significant site of contact with Egypt. Luigi palma di Cesnola and others extensively excavated the site of Kourion. The Roman tombs excavator there were elaborate and highly representative of Roman burial outside of Cyprus. Tomb 8, detailed by George McFadden had a stepped dromos with oblong ashars along the sides. The tomb had a saddled roof, and two large chambers with doorways. The doorways were accented by decorated posts and lintels. The interpretation of the complexity of this tomb is under debate. Another example of a tomb likely belonging to a foreign family is tomb 26, found by the Swedish Cyprus Expedition in the early 20th century at Amathus. The tomb is an unusual, large, flat tumulus tomb built upon a rock. The tomb has a circular shaft with a stone pithos in middle. Inside the pithos is an alabastron containing carefully washed, cremated bones. Other rare discoveries of Roman-period cremation remains have been found in cylindrical lead urns.

Cypro-Classical and Hellenistic tombs have been difficult for archaeologists to define because of haphazard excavation of tombs on Cyprus, as with other sites. Looting or treasure-seeking individuals often left tombs in unpreferable conditions, void of archaeological context, making modern research difficult, if not impossible. Additional prime examples of burials during the Roman period on Cyprus can be observed at the sites of Agioi Omologites — Nicosia, the necropolis at Marion, the necropolis near Skouriotissa, and tombs of Paphos, Kourion, Kition, and Salamis.

=== Women in Cyprus ===
During the Roman period, women were restricted mainly to domestic activities. Based on the large amount of epigraphical material from Mesaoria and the southern coast of Cyprus, women did have a part in public life. One-third of these epitaphs are to women. Most of these women mentioned are married to men of status and wealth, or come from wealthy families. This was the most common way for a woman to have a public life. For example, a woman from Salamis, the wife of a Salaminian High Priest of the Augusti, was honored by the League of Free Laconians for her public spirit. In addition, a Claudia Appharion, the High Priestess of Demeter for the entire island, was distinguished publicly as well. A woman belonging to a Senatorial family, and a benefactress of Paphos were also honored for their public spirit. Women were mainly left to household duties, but those of particular wealth, or married to men of political or high social status could make a name for themselves. Religion was really the only other avenue left to women to create a public identity.

== Art and culture ==
=== Glass in Roman Cyprus ===
Before the invention of glassblowing in the mid first-century BC, glass had been a fairly rare and expensive luxury, the use of which was mostly confined to containers for perfume and cosmetics. However, with the invention of glassblowing, glass became much more widely available and affordable and began to be produced on a much larger scale with factories dedicated to the production of glass being established throughout the Roman world, including Cyprus. Though it can sometimes be difficult to distinguish between locally produced Cypriot glass and imported glass, it can be conclusively stated that glass was being manufactured locally within the island. Evidence for this can be found in sites such as Salamis, Tamassos, Limassol and Amathus. A glass workshop was discovered at Tamassos by Ohnefalsch Richter, who was never able to fully publish his findings. He does however mention the discovery of a glass furnace, which points to glass being manufactured at the site. Richter's discoveries were never dated precisely, but many place them in the 2nd to 3rd centuries AD. Blocks of glass discovered at Salamis seem to indicate that this was another production center, though a furnace associated with this site has not yet been discovered. Cypriot glass is thought to have flourished in the Antonine and Severan periods, or from 140 to 240 AD, and indeed most of the glass discovered is dated to this time.

Olaf Vessberg studied the large quantities of glass found in the tombs of Limassol and Amathus and made several discoveries. First was that Cypriot glass is fairly homogeneous. Its function was for the most part limited to daily use, being employed either toward cosmetic purposes or as tableware. The principal shapes being produced by Cypriot glass blowers consisted predominantly of jars, beakers and unguentaria, or flasks that contained oil or perfume. Though it is often difficult to distinguish between beakers and jars, the word beaker is mostly used to describe drinking-vessels while jars are considered to be containers for salves and cosmetics. Distinguishing between the two can often be done through examination of the rim of the vessel which would often be unworked if it was not a drinking vessel. Furthermore, jars often had decorated lids that had a design enamelled on the side facing the interior. Among the unguentaria, there were bell-shaped, candlestick, and tubular. As stated before, many held oil or perfume but some think the tubular unguentaria, named tear-bottles by archeologists, may have contained the tears of relatives or the deceased. Glass was also being used in Cyprus to produce sack-shaped beakers. These are significant as they are only found in Cyprus. This, and the presence of several defective pieces in Cyprus gives further evidence of glass manufacturing in Cyprus.

=== Cypriot sculptures of the Roman period ===
Roman influence can be seen in the use and import of marble as a medium for sculptures, and the display of these sculptures within civic centers and private homes. This use of marble was limited to economically and politically powerful cities located near harbors such as Salamis and Paphos, where there was easier access to imported marble and means to afford and display these statues. It is unknown whether the marble was carved prior to shipment to Cyprus, or if the marble was shipped as blocks and carved on the island. Although marble was a key part of Roman period sculptures on Cyprus, limestone was still being used for sculptures. The use of limestone has been seen to reflect the easy access, and more likely cheaper material from which to carve from, but it has also been viewed as a reflection of Cypriot art style. Limestone may have been a deliberate choice made by the artist, or buyer, to have a Roman style sculpture carve in Cypriot limestone. This is assumed to reflect the idea of a Roman Cyprus, by combining the Roman art style with the Cypriot limestone. The sculptures discovered on the island do not cover the full Roman style; for example, togate figures and busts have not been found. However, many Roman-style portraits, statues, and a few reliefs have been found. Inscribed bases attest to the existence of bronze sculptures during the Roman period. The only surviving statue is of Emperor Septimius Severus.

While earlier Cypriot sculptures were generally reserved for sanctuaries, those of the Roman period appeared in the public eye, sometimes in large urban areas. This allowed the island to show off the grandeur and splendor of Rome, and to honor the Roman emperors.

With the transition to Christianity the older sculptures were modified to reflect Christian values, such as the covering or destruction of nudity, or modification of old Greek gods into Christian figures.

Presently, Salamis is the most important city for Roman period sculptures, but Paphos, Kourion, and Soli are also important archeological sites.

== Earthquakes ==
Cyprus is located at the boundary between the African and Eurasian plates, in which the African plate is colliding with the Eurasian plate. This collision between two plates is the cause for the large magnitude and frequent earthquakes, seen especially in the southern portion of the island where a portion of the African plate is subducting underneath Cyprus. Six earthquakes of note affected Cyprus during the Roman period. In 26 BC an earthquake with an intensity of 7 with an epicenter located southwest of Cyprus caused damage in the city of Paphos. In 15 BC many towns in Cyprus experienced a magnitude 8 earthquake, but at Paphos and Kourion it registered as a magnitude 9. Its epicenter was southwest of Paphos and it left the city in ruins. Paphos was subsequently rebuilt and renamed Augusta by the Romans. The earthquake of 76 AD was among the most destructive earthquakes, with a magnitude between 9 and 10, and it was reported to have created a tsunami. Its epicenter was located southeast of Cyprus. Salamis and Paphos took the brunt of this earthquake, and fell into ruin, with other cities such as Kition and Kourion assumed to have shared the same fate. The destructive nature of the earthquakes can also be recorded in the transfer of Roman mint to Cyprus, as a means to alleviate the island from this disaster. A magnitude 7 earthquake that left Salamis and Paphos in ruins occurred in 332 or 333 AD. Its epicenter was located east of the island. In 342 AD a magnitude 10 earthquake struck Paphos and Salamis, destroying the cities. It may also have changed the course of some small rivers, as well as causing a series of landslides and fault displacements. The final Roman-period earthquake, a magnitude 7 to 8, occurred in 365 AD. The south coast of Cyprus was greatly affected by the quake, especially Akrotiri and Kourion. A series of earthquakes following upon the initial quake laid waste to Kourion, and marked the transition into Christianity.

== Cities ==
=== Nea Paphos ===
Nea Paphos was founded on the western coast of Cyprus in 312 BC under Nikokles, the last monarch of the Pafian city-state. By the 2nd century it had grown in importance and became the capital of Roman Cyprus. Nea Paphos is distinct from Palaiaphos ("Old Paphos"). They were considered to be the same city under Roman rule and were connected by "a sacred way". Under Roman rule Nea Paphos was the main port while Palaiaphos with its Temple of Aphrodite was as a religious center. The Temple of Aphrodite at Palaiaphos was one of the most important temples in Cyprus. At the beginning of the 3rd century AD, a statue of Emperor Caracalla was consecrated at Nea Paphos.

=== Palaiaphos (Old Paphos) ===
In Roman Cyprus, Palaiaphos was known for the Sanctuary of Aphrodite Paphia. Palaiaphos is located on a limestone hill in southwestern Cyprus near the modern village of Kouklia at the mouth of the Diarizos River. Myth claims that the goddess Aphrodite was born here, near a sea stack called Petra tou Rhomiou. The Temple of Aphrodite precinct at Palaiaphos was also the leading center for the imperial cult in Cyprus. It remained a central place of worship in the Mediterranean world until Theodosius I outlawed all pagan practice in 391 AD.

=== Salamis ===
Salamis, located by the modern city of Famagusta, was one of the most important cities in Cyprus and the eastern Mediterranean during the reign of the Ptolemies. It represents a shift of center to the north, which coincided with the opening of the 'south harbor' at the southern end of the protecting reef—a harbor which was to remain in commission until the flooding of the entire coastline, possibly in the 4th century. But Salamis, despite this new harbor, was supplanted by Paphos in the early 2nd century BC as the capital of this island; and this distinction, once lost, was not recovered until AD 346, when the city was re-founded as Constantia.

An inscription of the middle Hellenistic date appears to attest to the existence of four gymnasia, which puts Salamis on par with Ephesus and Pergamum. The largest gymnasium, or panegyrikon, which has been excavated, was enlarged during the early Roman Empire by the addition of a bathing establishment and palaestra. Salamis also contained an amphitheatre, also excavated and partially restored, which had a capacity of no less than 15,000 spectators. The amphitheatre, as well as a Roman Bath House, are attributed to the Flavian Ser. Sulpicius Pancles Veranianus. Also discovered at Salamis was a massive temple to Zeus with a ramp constructed in the late republican or Augustan times and a vast colonnaded agora, which was in use throughout the Roman imperial period. Salamis, if not the political, remained the industrial capital of Cyprus.

In 22 AD, the temple of Zeus Olympius was one of only three temples in all Cyprus to receive confirmation of its right of asylum. However, there are only eight references, Hellenistic and Roman, to Zeus Olympius, and, as compared with the popularity of the Pafian, the god of Salamis was not esteemed by the emperors and their families. Salamis, unlike Paphos, appears to have been ill at ease with Rome and used, up until the time of Epiphanius, the Egyptian rather than the Roman imperial calendar. But inscriptions which honor emperors are by no means uncommon. There are honors accorded to Augustus, to Livia and to his adopted sons; to Tiberius, Nero, Vespasian, Hadrian, Pompeia Plotina, Marcus Aurelius and Commodus. There is particular enthusiasm for Hadrian, who came to the aid of Salamis, devastated in 116 AD by the Jewish insurrection of Artemion. Salamis flourished during the rule of the Severan dynasty, which is attested by numerous Severan inscriptions, one of which records the erection of a tethrippon to carry the statues of Septimius Severus, his wife and sons. Also, during this time, the orchestra of the theatre was converted into a pool for aquatic games. To the west of the city vast cemeteries extended, but, as compared to Archaic and Classical burial, the Roman tombs are conspicuous for their poverty. The imperial cult was prominent in Salamis, together with the very erratic incidence of Roman civitas. The city received water under Nero from the spring at Chytri, some 39 km (24 mi) away, by rock-cut channel and aqueduct.

Salamis was destroyed by repeated earthquakes in the middle of the 4th century AD but was quickly rebuilt as a Christian city by the Emperor of Constantinople, Constantius II—hence its new name, Constantia. This was a much smaller city than it was previously, centered around the harbor and fortified by walls. Some of the pagan public buildings that lay outside the boundaries of the Christian city, such as the gymnasium and even the theatre, were partly rebuilt, the former as baths and the latter to stage mimic productions.

=== Kourion ===
Kourion, located on the southern coast of Cyprus and protected by cliffs on the north and east, was a walled acropolis with a necropolis to the southeast, and a well-preserved stadium and the sanctuary of Apollo Hylates in the west. However, it is said to have made "no palpable impact upon the Roman world of its day". Most of what is known about this city comes from the many inscriptions found on the site and through the excavations of two large residences, the House of Achilles Mosaic and the House of the Gladiators.

Inscriptions found in Kourion have been an invaluable source on Kourion. They provide information the various building projects conducted in Kourion under the Romans and the involvement of various emperors. They also provide a record of several of the proconsuls in Kourion and their achievements. They give insight into the Neronian restoration, repairs done to the Hellenistic theatre under Augustus, the remodeling of the theater into a hunting-theatre under Caracalla, and other important events in the city. Kourion has a fair number of inscriptions on statues of important figures during the Roman period, including Nero, Trajan, and various proconsuls. There are also a few plaques in honor of Caracalla, Septimius Severus, and other important figures. Inscriptions in and around the Sanctuary of Apollo detail the stages of construction and improvements made to the sanctuary. Several defixiones, or curse tablets, have also been found at Kourion, often targeting other citizens over legal disputes and of a sufficient quantity to distinguish Kourion from other sites. Several funerary inscriptions left by relatives of the dead were also found although these were not particularly common in Kourion.

The Sanctuary of Apollo, approximately 1.5 km (1 mi) west of Kourion was a significant feature of the city, being described as the most impressive cult-centre in Cyprus. It is thought to have been built around 65 or 66 AD, during the reign of Nero and would have undoubtedly been destroyed by the massive earthquake of 365 AD. It was first discovered and excavated by Louis Cesnola, whose account of the site proved invaluable as it was later plundered and devastated by stone-seekers. Though Cesnola mentions the presence of columns in his account, none were found by later excavators. The temple would later be rediscovered by George McFadden, who found that the temple had two phases; Hellenistic and Roman. Robert Scranton suggested that the temple was never completely rebuilt but instead had its front remodeled, interior divided, and floor level raised under the Romans. Though there is still some debate regarding the exact dating of the temple, many believe it to have been constructed during the reign of Nero. This is supported by the fact that the Neronian period was a time of relative prosperity in Kourion as attested to by the fact that the Theater of Kourion was rebuilt around 64 or 65 AD, only a year or two before the construction of the temple. Overall, it seems that the temple was modernized under the Romans but no dramatic changes appear to have been made. Flowing water (provided to the temple and the city during the reign of Claudius) and a tighter organization of the space constitute two examples of Roman modernization of the temple. The temple also seems to have had strong Near Eastern connections, evidenced by coins, architecture, and pottery. Because of Kourion's association of Trajan as Apollo Caesar with Apollo Hylates, he contributed to the building of several structures including the curium gate, SE building, the bath house, S building, and the NW building, as indicated by inscriptions bearing his name. However, after his death worship of Apollo Caesar ended.

The House of the Achilles Mosaic, with its open courtyard surrounded by rooms on both sides and colonnaded portico to the northeast, was dated to approximately the first half of the fourth century AD and had a large mosaic depicting the famous Greek myth in which Odysseus, by sounding a false alarm, was able to fool Achilles, then disguised as a woman, to reveal his true identity, thus bringing about his participation in the Trojan War. The building had mosaic floors, one of which, although damaged, seems to portray the Trojan prince Ganymede being abducted by Zeus.

More is known about the House of the Gladiators, which was located in proximity to the city wall and several meters east of the House of Achilles, seems to have been the residence of a fairly affluent patrician. This house is dated to the second half of the third century AD, apparently having been built prior to the House of Achilles. It consisted of a central courtyard with corridors lining all four walls. The rooms open directly into these corridors. The floor was once covered with mosaics, with cisterns underground to collect rainwater. The house did not escape the devastating earthquake of 365 AD unscathed. The walls, roof, and mosaics were all severely damaged. Located in the central courtyard is a mosaic, remarkably preserved, depicting a gladiatorial combat scene, This is significant as such scenes were extremely rare in Cyprus. Only two of the three panels depicting this scene survive.

The theater, which was built in the northern part of the acropolis and excavated by the Pennsylvania University Museum from 1949 to 1950, was renovated under Roman rule sometime around 100 AD and once more around 200 AD. Though the auditorium was originally a fully formed circle, under the Romans it was reduced to a half-circle. Around the second century AD it was enlarged to its current size and several buttresses were added to support it. Around 200 AD, it was remodeled to accommodate hunting and gladiatorial games, only to later be converted back into a traditional theater around 300 AD. It is thought to have accommodated somewhere around 3,500 spectators. The theater appears to have been abandoned sometime during the fourth century. It still stands today but suffered much from stone-seekers.

The stadium, also excavated by the Pennsylvania University Museum, was located in the northwestern region of Kourion with its U-shaped foundation and three entrance gates still standing today and remarkably preserved. It is thought to have been built around the 2nd century AD under the Antonine emperors and remained in use until around 400 AD. It likely accommodated around 6,000 spectators and consisted of a long oval race track for runners and chariot races. An account can be found of its last race and destruction, provided by a Cypriote writing a fictional account of the life of Staint Barnabas in the fifth century.

The necropolis was excavated by Cesnola in 1876, and then more reliably under George McFadden who dug 95 pits and uncovered 9 tombs, only one of which he published. This tomb, named Tomb 8, was likely constructed in the third century BC and used up until the first century AD. The other unpublished tombs also seemed to have had similarly extended periods of use. The knowledge regarding Kourion's tombs is not extensive. They are known to be "extremely large and elaborate".

The fall of Roman Kourion can be attributed to the massive earthquake that occurred on 21 April 365 AD. Based on the descriptions of the quake, it appears to have caused a tsunami and has been tentatively given the measurement of 11 on the Modified Mercalli scale, with other sources state a magnitude 10. This earthquake marks the end of antiquity and the start of the Middle Ages as well as the transition to Christianity.

=== Kition ===
The ancient city of Kition is completely overlaid by the modern city of Larnaca, and is therefore largely unexcavated. It possessed an acropolis at Bamboula; to the southeast of the acropolis lay a large natural harbor, which has since been silted in. It was very important port city for trade and was administered by the Phoenicians prior to the Romans. Under Roman rule, aspects of the old city life remained. For example, the cult of Eshmun continued into the Augustan age through a transition to the worship of Asclepius. Kition was often referred to as "the city" ("e polis" or "o demos"), which was reflective of its old Phoenician name. There is an abundance of inscriptions in Kition, especially funerary inscriptions, many of which show influences of other cultures, such as Semitic names that have been Hellenized. However, Imperial influence is still apparent in the finding of two statues to Emperor Nerva.

Three small areas of the site have been excavated; it was first excavated by the Swedish Cyprus Expedition in 1929; second, by Vassos Karageorghis in 1976; and most recently by Marguerite Yon in 1985.

=== Arsinoe ===
Arsinoe (immediately north of the modern city of Polis) was founded in 270 BC and continued with varying levels of prosperity into Roman times and so it is well recorded by the geographers of the Roman period as being an important regional city. Arsinoe's importance depended on its proximity to the south Anatolian coast and the Aegean for trade as well as being a major center of exportation for the imperial copper mines at Limni through the natural harbor at the site. Arsinoe's civic importance in the Roman world is attested to the mile-markers found in the region, which were measured in distance from the city. A Roman theatre and a gymnasium from the Ptolemaic period are the only major ruins left at the site. However Strabo, the Greek geographer, tells about a sanctuary to Zeus and Aphrodite a short distance outside the Roman city. Although there are a few archaeological remains, there is a surprising lack of epigraphical evidence for a city that played such an important role in Roman Cyprus. Until recently the only major excavations done at the site was a survey in 1960 conducted by the Department of Antiquities. Recent excavations undertaken by Princeton University are still ongoing but a preliminary exhibition of the artifacts found at Arsinoe is available at the Princeton Art Museum.

=== Minor cities ===
==== Amathus ====
The ancient city of Amathus, near modern-day Limassol, was a city of importance before Roman rule. After Nea Paphos was established as the center of Roman administration on Cyprus, Amathus began to decline. Only the granting of asylum for the sanctuary of Aphrodite by the senate in 22 AD preserved its existence. The city remained unexcavated until 1975, when Pierre Aupert and the French School at Athens discovered remains on the acropolis, including the temple to Ahprodite, a Christian basilica, palace storerooms, and explored the port. The temple of Aphrodite was renovated in the first or second century AD to combine both Greek and Near Eastern architectural styles. The new structure included a pronaos, a cella, and an adyton. Systematic destruction of the building by later inhabitants makes any further detail for the interior of the structure unidentifiable. The excavator also cannot determine if there was a cult statue housed in the temple. One distinct feature is the style of capitals used on the columns. They are Nabataean style, which is thought to have originated in Egypt. Unlike the sanctuary to Aphrodite in Palaiaphos, pilgrims did not visit the temple in Amathus. In addition to the temple on the acropolis, remains of a typical Roman style bath house were found. A vast necropolis surrounds the city, the south being largely Hellenistic and Roman burials, and the east being strictly imperial burials. Hundreds of cippi were found widespread throughout the city that suggest "a vigorous village life, seemingly less dependent on the polis then elsewhere in Cyprus". Other structures that have been attested to, but not yet discovered, in Amathus are the temple to Hera and the temple to the mysterious Seven within the Stelae.

==== Karpasia ====
Karpasia, near modern Rizokarpaso, remains mostly unexcavated. The site itself consists of about 3 square kilometres (1.2 sq mi) on the Karpas Peninsula next to a natural harbor. The remains of walls which surrounded the entirety of the city can still be seen. An aqueduct, built in Roman times, brought water to the city from natural springs. The remains of columns suggest the presence of a temple near the city's harbor. The chief deity of the Karpas Peninsula was Aphrodite Acraea, whose temple was located at the tip of Cape Apostolos Andreas, and farmlands near modern Rizokarpaso were dedicated to her. Karpasia is mentioned by historians in the Classical era, and in inscriptions dating to the Julio-Claudian and Hadrianic eras.

==== Ceryneia ====
Ceryneia, now overlaid by modern-day Kyrenia, was a port city on the northern coast of Cyprus. There is much evidence for the ancient city but epigraphic and archaeological evidence from the Roman era is inconclusive. Although it remains unexcavated, the ancient harbor still stands and occasional finds are made and reported. Three inscription were found that dated the city to the Roman period; an oath of allegiance to Tiberius the "Apollo of Ceryneia," a dedication to the "demos of Ceryneia" on a statue, and one mentioning the construction of a water-system during Claudius' reign.

==== Chytri ====
Chytri (east of modern Kythrea) was one of only two inland cities on Roman Cyprus (the other was Tamassus). Chytri's most important topographical feature — and the reason for its continued existence — was its bounteous spring. The site has not been excavated, though an acropolis and extensive cemetery have been identified. Geographers and a single inscription attest to Chytri's independence during the Roman period. Inscriptions indicate a close relationship with Salamis, Chytri's most convenient access to the Mediterranean. Salamis, on the other hand, valued access to Chytri's springwater and under Nero a rock-cut channel and aqueduct was built to bring water to the coastal site. By the time of Caracalla, Chytri may have been subordinate to Salamis. Source: Mitford 1980, 1329–1330.

==== Lapethus ====
Lapethus was a harbor town located along the northern coast of Cyprus near modern-day Karavas. It was most famous for its copper and earthenware processing, though it was an important commercial site regardless. Copious springs nearby provided the city with a constant supply of freshwater. Remains of the harbor's breakwater and city walls are still visible today, though no other ancient structures can be identified. The city had long been Phoenician in culture, and maintained Semitic speech for a long time before Hellenization kicked in. Although the site still remains unexcavated (due to its location in the north), the few inscriptions that originated from this area indicate that the city was extremely important from an economical standpoint; so much so, that Ptolemy says that it is one of the four conventi that divided the island. Neither temples nor theatres can be found at the site, but it is obvious that the city was accepting of Roman influence because of inscriptions suggesting a gymnasium where the Actaean games were performed in honor of Augustus's victory. Other inscriptions suggest statues of Augustus, Tiberius, Trajan, and Hadrian within the city walls. The consular of the island during the mid third century, Cl. Leontichus Illyrius, is the first example of imperial distinction bestowed upon a family native to Cyprus.

==== Soli ====
Soli was the most important city of north-western Cyprus and the ruins cover a wide area with a low hill that supported the acropolis that is covered by a modern village. This city had great importance to agriculture on the Morphau plain the copper mines in Skouriotissa. The acropolis boasted a large cavea that could hold up to 3,500 spectators. The site had a broad paved and colonnaded street that ran from east to west across the city. There was also an excavated temple to an unidentified deity as well as an attested gymnasium and temple of Zeus that was once at the site. Statues of important Roman figures such as Emperor Trajan and Marcus Aurelius were erected at the site as well as dedications to Nero, Augustus, and Trajan. The city had great economic importance in Roman Cyprus due to the attested presence of a curator civitatis and a public records office.

==== Tamassos ====
Tamassos (covered in part by modern Politiko) is an extensive and unexcavated site named in the 2nd century BC. The major topographical features is an outline of the walls to the city, a probable acropolis, and necropolis. The evidence for civic status of the city is determined from geographers. Under Roman rule cities and villages located in the hinterland with no viable economic assets tended to decay, however the copper mine of Tamassos allowed the city to maintain itself, albeit only modestly as seen in only one valuable funerary inscription was found. The mine was the most important aspect of the city, with the copper transported to the port of Soli for trade.

== Episcopal sees ==
Ancient episcopal sees of the Roman province of Cyprus listed in the Annuario Pontificio as titular sees:

- Amathus in Cypro
- Arsinoë in Cypro (Polis)
- Carpasia
- Cerynia
- Chytri
- Citium
- Curium
- Famagusta
- Lapithus
- Neapolis in Cypro
- Paphus
- Salamis
- Soli
- Tamasus
- Tremithus

== See also ==
- List of Roman governors of Roman Cyprus
