= Karpasia =

Karpasia may refer to:

- Karpas Peninsula, in northeastern Cyprus
- Karpasia (town), an ancient town on the peninsula
