= Ersin Paşa, İskele =

Ersin Paşa
- Country (de jure): Cyprus
  - District: Famagusta District
- Country (de facto): Northern Cyprus
  - District: İskele District

Population (2011)
  - Total: 861
- Time zone: UTC+2 (EET)
  - Summer (DST): UTC+3 (EEST)

Ersin Paşa is a quarter (mahalle) of Rizokarpaso in Northern Cyprus. De jure, Rizokarpaso is part of Cyprus.
