= Vokolida =

Vokolida Βοκολίδα Bafra
- Village
- Nickname: Bafra Beach
- Location in Cyprus
- Coordinates: 35°22′44″N 34°4′15″E
- Country (de jure): Cyprus
  - District: Famagusta District
- Country (de facto): Northern Cyprus
  - District: İskele District

Government
  - Mukhtar: Selim Çetil

Population (2011)
  - Total: 1,019
- Time zone: UTC+2 (EET)
  - Summer (DST): UTC+3 (EEST)
- Website: bafrabeach.com

Vokolida (Greek: Βοκολίδα, Turkish: Bafra) is a village in the Famagusta District of Cyprus, located on the Karpas Peninsula. It is under the de facto control of Northern Cyprus.

The Bafra region has been designated a holiday resort with luxury hotels "Bafra Beach" for tourist expansion by the North Cyprus government.
