= Golden Beach =

Golden Beach may refer to:

- Golden Beach, Queensland, Australia, a suburb
- Golden Beach, Victoria, Australia, a settlement
- Golden Beach (Paros), Greece, a beach
- Golden Beach, Cyprus, Cyprus, a wide remote sand beach
- Golden Beach (Hong Kong), a public beach
- Golden Beach, Chennai, India, a beach
- Puri Beach, or the Golden beach, a beach in Puri, Odisha, India
- Golden Beach, Florida, United States, a town
- Golden Beach, Maryland, United States, a census-designated place

== See also ==
- Golden Sands, Bulgaria
