= Ayios Theodoros Karpasias =

Ayios Theodoros Karpasias is a village at the base of the Karpas peninsula of Cyprus, which dates back, in the 2nd century B.C. It is built in an area rich in archaeological sites of the earliest periods in history and attesting to a highly developed civilization in the area from the time of the Cretan Mycean civilisation. Many ancient Greek tombs, one inscription dated in the 2nd century B.C. and a milestone of the 1st century AD indicate that people formed a community at the very same location for over 2000 years. Nearby is the famous Cape Elea covered with low forest and thousands of olive trees. At the seashore the remains exist of an ancient city, Elea, destroyed by earthquakes in 343 A.D. After the city's destruction, the surviving inhabitants moved towards the site which is now Ayios Theodoros.

During the 4th century A.D. the village has taken its modem Christian name after the Roman soldier Theodoros who became a martyr, Saint Theodore of Christianity.

During the Byzantine era and the Arab attacks against Cyprus (600 - 900 A.D.) the village, well hidden from the sea, became the refuge for the people who lived near the seashore and moved inland to escape the attacks. At that time many of the people of Ayia Theodora (a nearby town destroyed during the attacks) moved to Ayios Theodoros. During the Venetian period (1489–1570) the village became the agricultural centre of the area and rich landowners were established here.

After the Ottoman occupation of Cyprus in 1571 the village suffered destruction and for almost 200 years it disappeared from the maps. It has emerged during the 18th century with very few inhabitants, many of which were forced to change religion from Christian to Muslim. They remained however "cryptochristians" until modern times.

The population of Ayios Theodoros has risen sharply during the 20th century and the village became a local centre maintaining a police station, courtrooms and forestry station. The first telegraph station in Cyprus connecting the island with Syria opened here at the beginning of the century. Kyriakos Rossides, a well-known politician and intellectual lived in Ayios Theodoros. He was one of the twelve members of the Legislative Council during the British rule of the island. His daughter, Thraki Rossidou-Jones has been established as the naive art painter of Cyprus. Kikis Photiatis is also a well-known artist from Ayios Theodoros and many of the themes of his paintings stem from his village life. Two other intellectuals, Constantinos Kentis and Antonis Dhiglis have played a major educational role at the beginning of this century.

Ayios Theodoros & The Turkish invasion

The happiness and peaceful life of this village was suddenly disrupted in 1974 by the Turkish invasion. During the second phase of the Turkish military attack, in the afternoon of 14 August 1974 after hearing about the atrocities of the advancing Turkish army most of the inhabitants of Ayios Theodoros fled towards the British base of Dhekelia in the south, in order to escape humiliation and save their lives. Those who stayed behind, mostly the elderly and the sick, were forced to leave in the following months. Two youth from the village, Tasos Anastasi and Yiannos Koumi, were killed in action on 20 July 1974, the first day of the invasion.

In the aftermath of the invasion the Turkish army looted the village. The Byzantine icon of St. Theodoros and other church ornaments were stolen. Soon after settlers from Anatolia and Turkish Cypriots occupied and live in Greek properties until now. The three main churches are reduced into ruins and the once well looked after houses and other village buildings are now falling apart.

The village is now still occupied by the Turkish Army. Its churches have been destroyed and their old and rare icons have been stolen. The graves in the Cemetery were opened and their crosses smashed to pieces. All houses and shops were looted. Illegal Turkish settlers form Anatolia were brought in to live in the Greek properties of Ayios Theodoros. The village name, dating back to 300 AD was changed to a Turkish name.

The Greek inhabitants of Ayios Theodoros have been dispersed. The majority live in free Cyprus, but a considerable number immigrated to United Kingdom, Australia and the United States. Today approximately 150 families from the village live in the United Kingdom.
