= Bogazi =

Bogazi: Μπογάζι (Greek); Boğaz (Turkish)
- Village
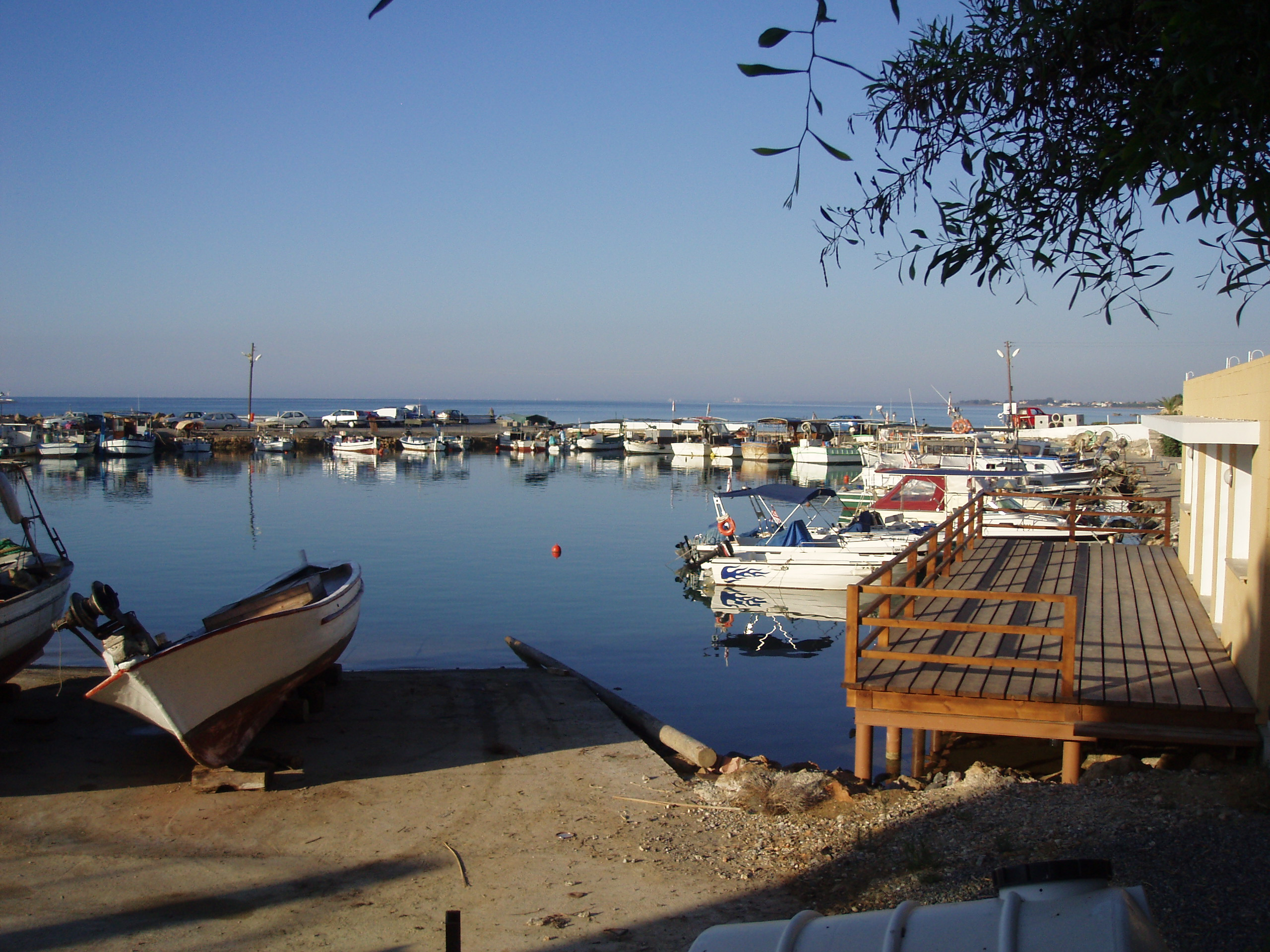
- Bogazi - port

- Location in Cyprus
- Coordinates: 35°18′43″N 33°56′58″E
- Country (de jure): Cyprus
  - District: Famagusta District
- Country (de facto): Northern Cyprus
  - District: İskele District

Government
  - Mukhtar: Nevzat Çakır

Population (2011)
  - Total: 157
- Time zone: UTC+2 (EET)
  - Summer (DST): UTC+3 (EEST)

Bogazi (Greek: Μπογάζι; Turkish: Boğaz) is a village in Cyprus, located 7 km northeast of Trikomo in the Karpaz Peninsula. It is under the de facto control of Northern Cyprus.

There is Turkish navy installation in the village, a former Cyprus Navy base, "Bogazi Naval Base".
