= Apostolos Andreas Monastery =

Holy building in Cyprus

Apostolos Andreas
- Απόστολος Ανδρέας / Apostolos Andreas Manastırı
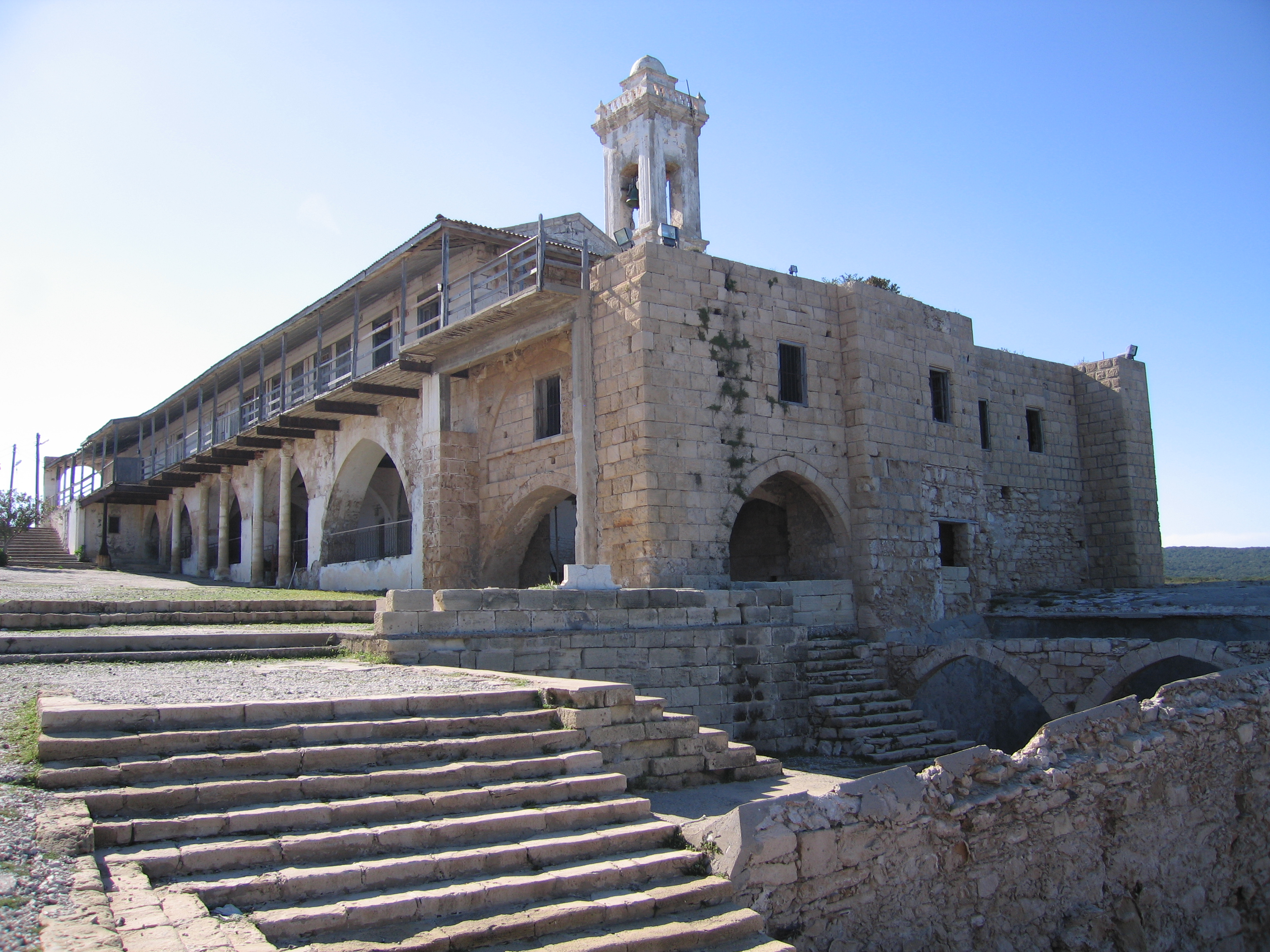

- The location of Apostolos Andreas Monastery

Religion
- Affiliation: Greek Orthodox Church
- District: Famagusta District
- Rite: Byzantine Rite
- Ecclesiastical or organisational status: Monastery
- Patron: Andrew the Apostle
- Status: Active

Location
- Location: Karpas Peninsula, Cape Apostolos Andreas
- Country: Cyprus (de jure); Northern Cyprus (de facto)
- Coordinates: 35.6593°N 34.5738°E

Apostolos Andreas Monastery (Greek: Απόστολος Ανδρέας; Turkish: Apostolos Andreas Manastırı) is a monastery situated just south of Cape Apostolos Andreas, the north-easternmost point of the island of Cyprus, in Rizokarpaso in the Karpas Peninsula. The monastery is dedicated to Saint Andrew and is an important site for the Cypriot Orthodox Church. It was once known as "the Lourdes of Cyprus", served not by an organized community of monks but by a changing group of volunteer priests and laymen. Both Greek Cypriot and Turkish Cypriot communities consider the monastery a holy place. As such, it is visited by many people for votive prayers. The contents of the monastery are also noteworthy.

== History ==
The traditional story of the monastery's founding says that, during a journey to the Holy Land, the ship transporting Saint Andrew went off course and struck rocks here. On coming ashore, Andrew hit the rocks with his staff, at which point a spring gushed forth. The waters proved to have healing powers and restored the sight of the ship's captain, who had been blind in one eye. Thereafter, the site became a place of pilgrimage. A fortified monastery stood here in the 12th century, from which Isaac Komnenos negotiated his surrender to Richard the Lionheart. In the 15th century, a small chapel was built close to the shore. The church of the main monastery dates to the 18th century, while the main buildings are 100 years later.

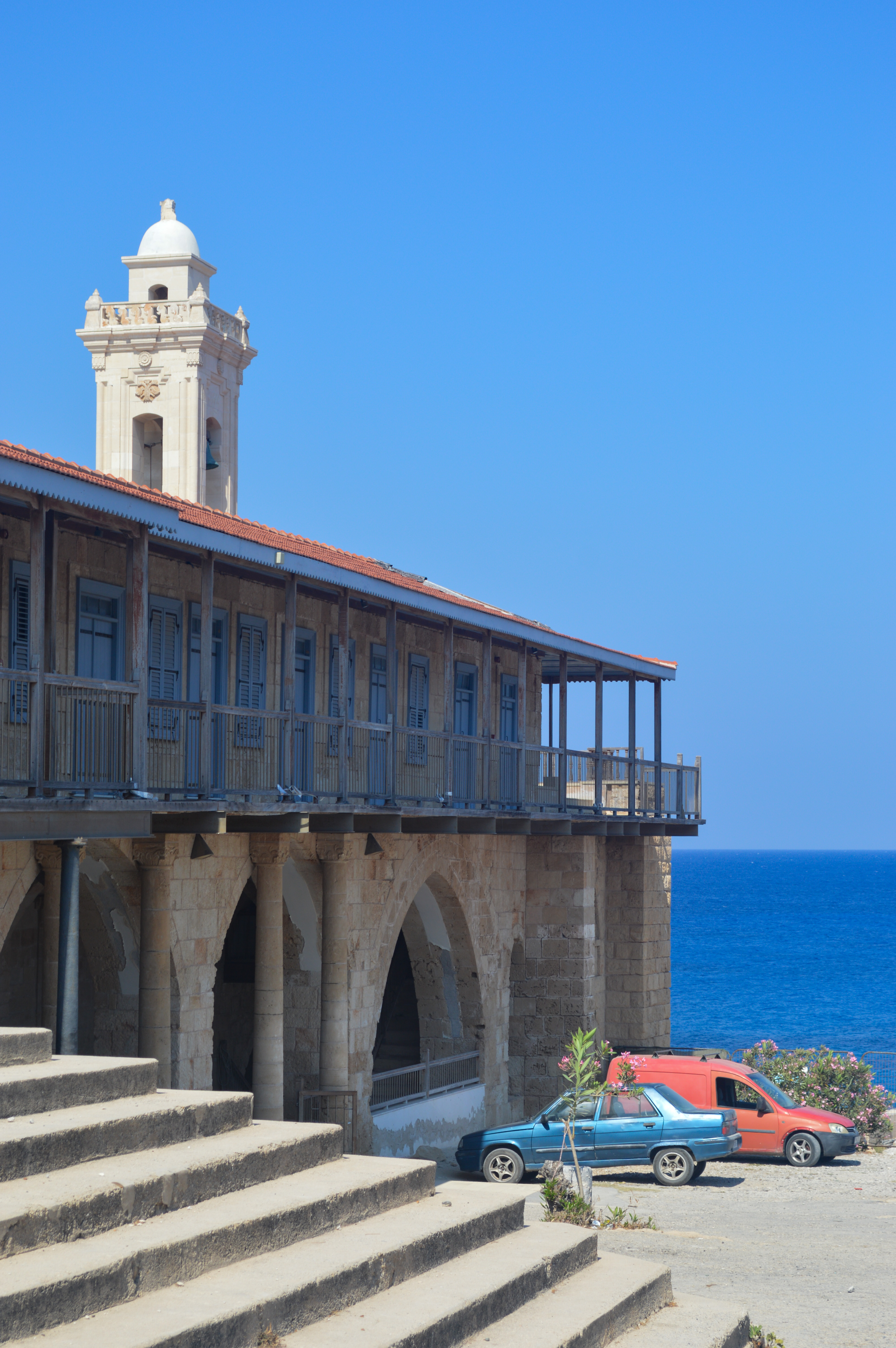
Bell tower and pilgrim accommodation wings of the monastery

Mass pilgrimage, however, is only comparatively recent, dating back to the 20th century. The story is told that in 1895 the son of Maria Georgiou was kidnapped. Seventeen years later, Saint Andrew appeared to her in a dream, telling her to pray for her son's return at the monastery. Living in Anatolia, she embarked on the crossing to Cyprus on a very crowded boat. Telling her story during the journey, one of the passengers, a young Dervish priest, became more and more interested. Asking if her son had any distinguishing marks, and on hearing of a pair of birthmarks, he stripped off his clothes to reveal the same marks, and mother and son were reunited.

After the Turkish intervention of Cyprus in 1974, the number of pilgrims to the monastery dwindled, but with the opening of crossing points in 2004 more pilgrims have begun to visit the monastery. The monastery has fallen into a state of disrepair in recent years, and UN funding is in place to pay for refurbishment.

== Restoration ==
A bi-communal technical committee was created in 2008 to be responsible for protecting the island's cultural heritage. The committee has been coordinating Apostolos Andreas' restoration efforts for the past year. Initially the Church of Cyprus refused to co-operate because a document prepared by the United Nations Development Programme did not name it as the owner of the monastery, but merely donors, with Archbishop Chrysostomos II saying he was willing to let the historic monastery collapse rather than sign up to a plan that did not recognize the Church of Cyprus as the owner. However, this position was reconsidered, in late January 2013, when the United Nations formulated a proposal that the project would go ahead on a "multi-donor partnership" allowing more than one donor to fund the project. The UNDP signed separate protocol agreements with the Church of Cyprus and Turkish Cypriot EVKAF's religious foundation EVKA.

On 12 January 2013, authorities in Northern Cyprus stated that the monastery will undergo extensive restoration costing more than 5 million euros. The restoration work is currently being conducted by an international team of experts and is being funded by the Church of Cyprus (€2,500,000), EVKAF Administration (€2,500,000) and the United States Agency for International Development (USAID) (€25,000).
