= Cyprus donkey =

Breed of donkey

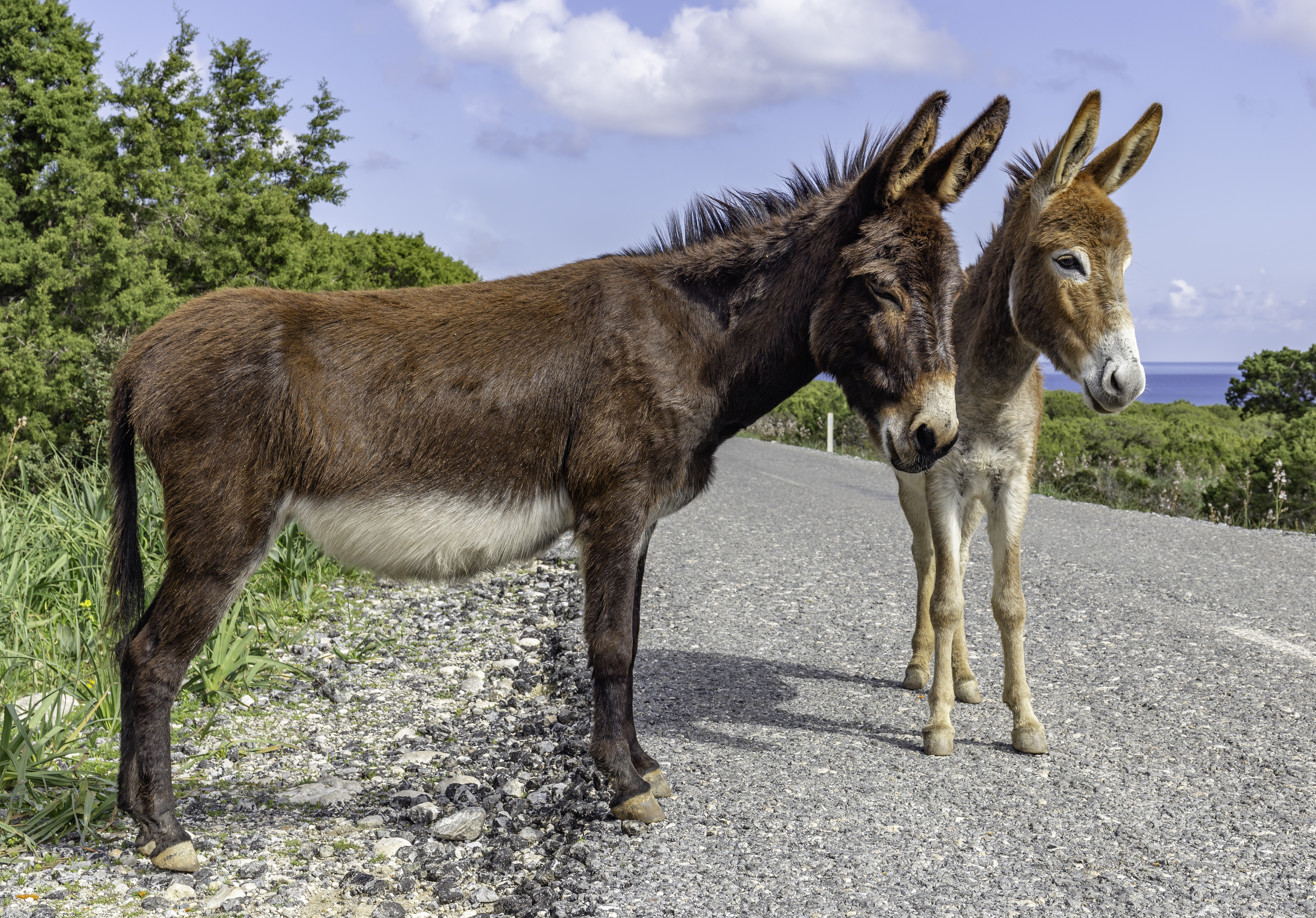
- Cyprus donkeys
- Country of origin: Cyprus

The Cyprus donkey is the donkey breed of the Mediterranean island of Cyprus. There are two principal strains: a large dark-coloured type with a pale belly, probably of European origin; and a small grey African type which represents about 20% of the total population, which in 2002 was estimated at 2200–2700.

The Cypriot donkey was an integral component of rural life from prehistoric times until the 20th century. Archimandrite Kyprianos In 1788 records that feral donkeys existed in the mountainous regions of Akamas and Karpasia.

Some hundreds of Cyprus donkeys live in a feral state on the Karpass Peninsula in the Turkish-controlled northern part of Cyprus. They were abandoned there by Greek Cypriot farmers during the Turkish invasion in 1974. In 2008, a group of Greek and Turkish Cypriots organized to save the animals from extinction after ten of them were found shot dead.
