= Rizokarpaso =

Town in northeastern Cyprus

Rizokarpaso: Ριζοκάρπασο (Greek); Dipkarpaz (Turkish)
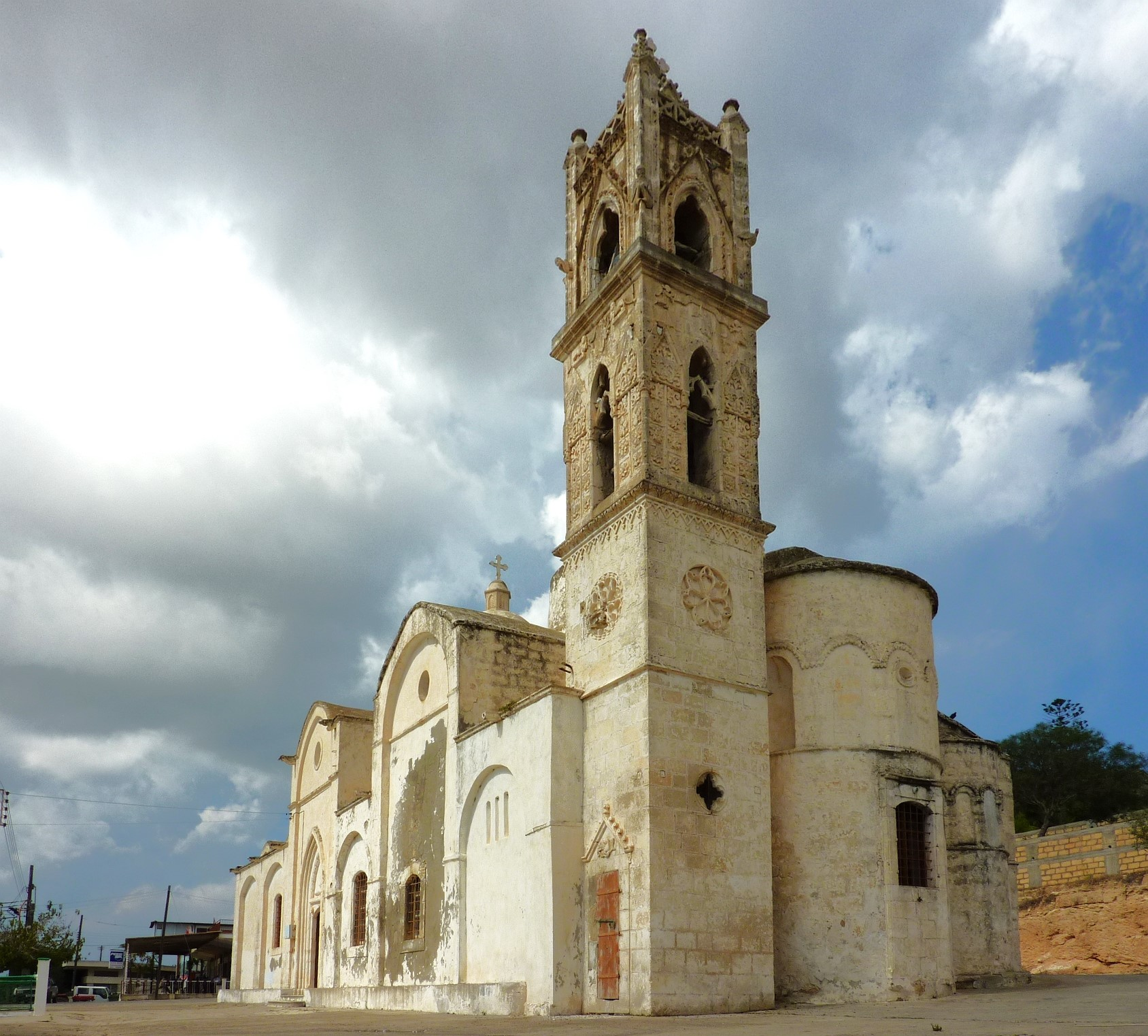
- Ayios Synesios Church

- Rizokarpaso in Cyprus.
- Coordinates: 35°35′55″N 34°22′50″E
- Country (de jure): Cyprus
  - District: Famagusta District
- Country (de facto): Northern Cyprus
  - District: İskele District

Government
  - Mayor: Suphi Coşkun (CTP)

Population (2011)
  - Total: 2,349
- Time zone: UTC+2 (EET)
  - Summer (DST): UTC+3 (EEST)

Rizokarpaso (Greek: Ριζοκάρπασο [locally [rizˑoˈkar̥paso]]; Turkish: Dipkarpaz) is a town on the Karpas Peninsula in the northeastern part of Cyprus. While nominally part of the Famagusta District of the Republic of Cyprus, it has been under the control of Northern Cyprus since the Turkish invasion of the island in 1974, being administered as part of the İskele District.

Rizokarpaso is one of the largest towns on the peninsula. Soil near the town consists of terra fusca, which is very fertile. Local crops include carob, cotton, tobacco, and grain. The municipality's territory features the Karpaz National Park, home to the Karpass donkey and some of the finest beaches of the island.

The economy is primarily based on agriculture, husbandry, and fisheries. Since 2000, the town has embraced the concept of eco-tourism, and converted old traditional village houses into guesthouses in traditional styles. The area has no industrial plants.

== Geography ==
Two kilometres (1.2 mi) north of the town of Rizokarpaso lies the Ayfilon Beach, administered by the municipality as a public beach. The beach takes its name from the Ayios Philon Church in the ancient town of Karpasia, which is 500 metres (1,600 ft) away. The beach is a breeding ground for loggerhead sea turtles, and as such is a center of attention for conservationists. It is also billed in tourist guides as a "spot to watch sunsets". It hosts an annual festival dedicated to sea turtles in August featuring concerts, release of turtle hatchlings, beach clean-ups, and other environmental awareness activities on the beach.

=== Climate ===
Climate data for Rizokarpaso, Cyprus
Month	Jan	Feb	Mar	Apr	May	Jun	Jul	Aug	Sep	Oct	Nov	Dec	Year
Mean daily maximum °C (°F)	16 (61)	16 (61)	18 (64)	21 (70)	25 (77)	28 (82)	31 (88)	32 (90)	30 (86)	27 (81)	22 (72)	18 (64)	24 (75)
Mean daily minimum °C (°F)	13 (55)	13 (55)	14 (57)	16 (61)	20 (68)	24 (75)	27 (81)	27 (81)	26 (79)	23 (73)	19 (66)	15 (59)	20 (68)
Source: "Dipkarpaz Monthly Climate Averages". Dipkarpaz Monthly Climate Average, Cyprus. World Weather Online. 2021.

== History ==
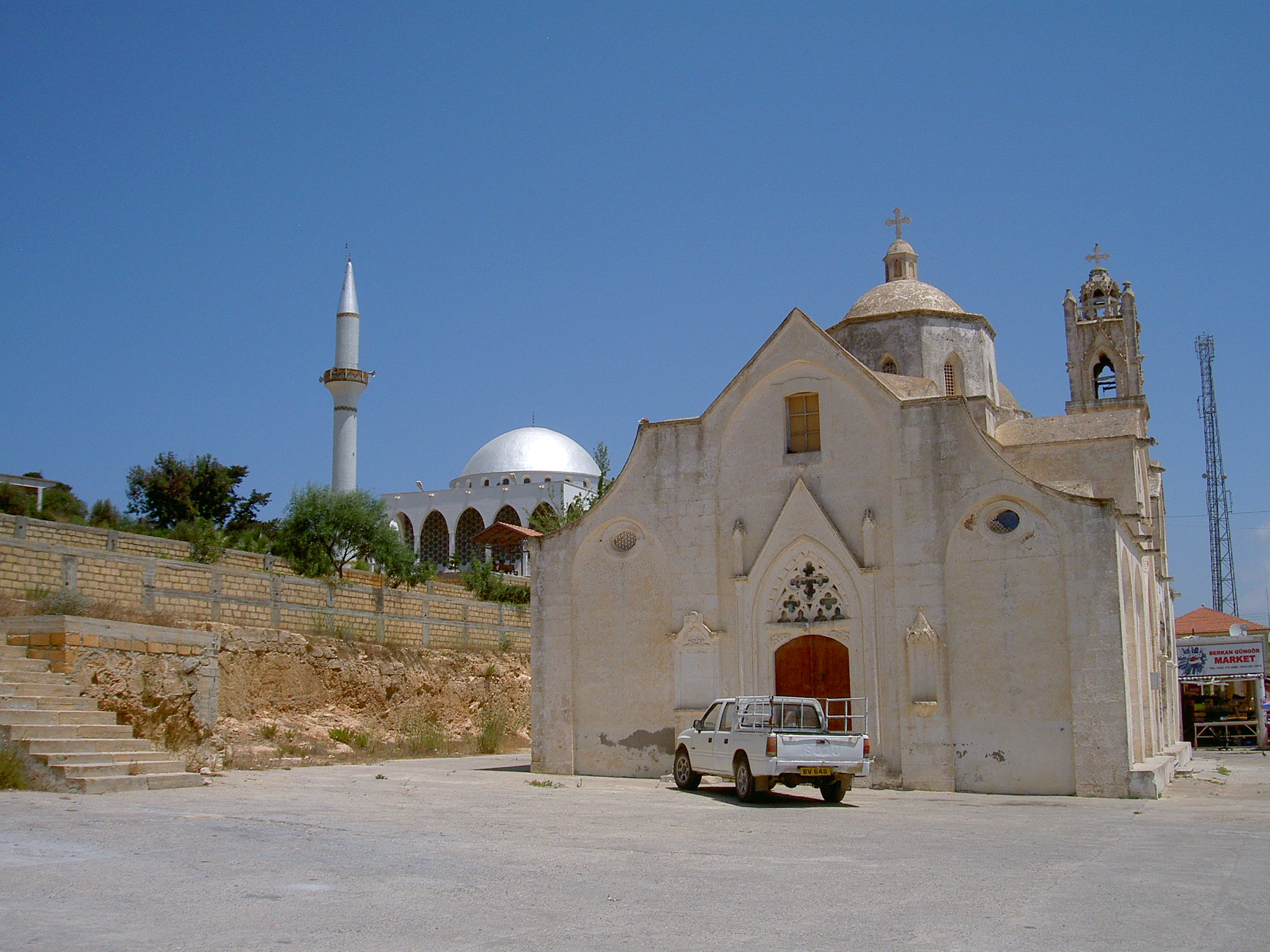
St. Synesius Orthodox church with mosque in background in Dipkarpaz (Rizokarpaso)

The Rizokarpaso area contains some of the earliest inhabited places in the island. These include the ancient cities of Karpasia and Aphendrika. It was the seat of one of the largest Lusignan baronies.

In 1222, the Lusignan dynasty ruling the Kingdom of Cyprus, together with the Latin nobility, decided that the traditional Greek Cypriot bishoprics in the urban centres would be abolished. Karpasia was one of the only four Greek bishoprics in the island that were allowed to continue to function (together with Soli, Arsinoe and Lefkara), and in practice subsumed the Bishopric of Famagusta, as the Bishop of Famagusta was sent to Rizokarpaso and continued his work in St. Synesios, the main Orthodox church in the region. This arrangement was formalised by the Bulla Cypria, a papal bull issued by Pope Alexander IV in 1260. Despite the official assignment of the bishopric to Karpasia, by then the town had lost the importance it held in the late antique period, and it is "probable" that by 1260 the bishops did not really reside in Karpasia but kept operating from Famagusta. According to Stefano Lusignan, the town of Rizokarpaso became a part of the feudal estate of the de Nores family, until James II of Cyprus revoked Gauthier de Nores's rights due to his support of Queen Charlotte, James's opponent.

The town has two churches: St. Synesios and the church of the Holy Trinity. They are examples of the typical Cypriot mixed style, combining features of the late Gothic introduced by the Lusignans with the late Byzantine style of the Orthodox tradition. These are two of the few Christian churches to operate in the northern part of Cyprus, and has allegedly had services stopped by the Turkish Cypriot police.

== Demographics ==
Before 1974, the town was predominantly inhabited by Greek Cypriots. During the 1974 Turkish invasion of Cyprus, the peninsula was cut off by Turkish troops, preventing the town's Greek Cypriot inhabitants from fleeing to the south. As a result, with 250 Greek Cypriot inhabitants, Rizokarpaso is the home of the largest Greek population in Northern Cyprus. Between 1974 and 1985, around 2,500 Greek Cypriots left the village. Although the Greek Cypriot population is now mainly elderly and shrinking in size, they are still supplied by the UN, and Greek Cypriot products are consequently available in some places.

In 1977, Turkish settlers were brought from different areas of Turkey, including Kars, Muş, Diyarbakır and Ağrı in the Eastern Anatolia region, Mersin and Adana in the Mediterranean Region and Akkuş, Çarşamba, Akçaabat, Sürmene, Araklı and Trabzon in the Black Sea Region. In the 21st century, some Turkish Cypriots and Europeans also bought properties in the village and are now its residents.

== Politics ==
The town has a Turkish Cypriot municipality, whose current mayor is Suphi Coşkun from the Republican Turkish Party. Coşkun won the post in 2014, with over 50% of the votes, beating his predecessor, Mehmet Demirci of the National Unity Party.

== Culture and tourism ==
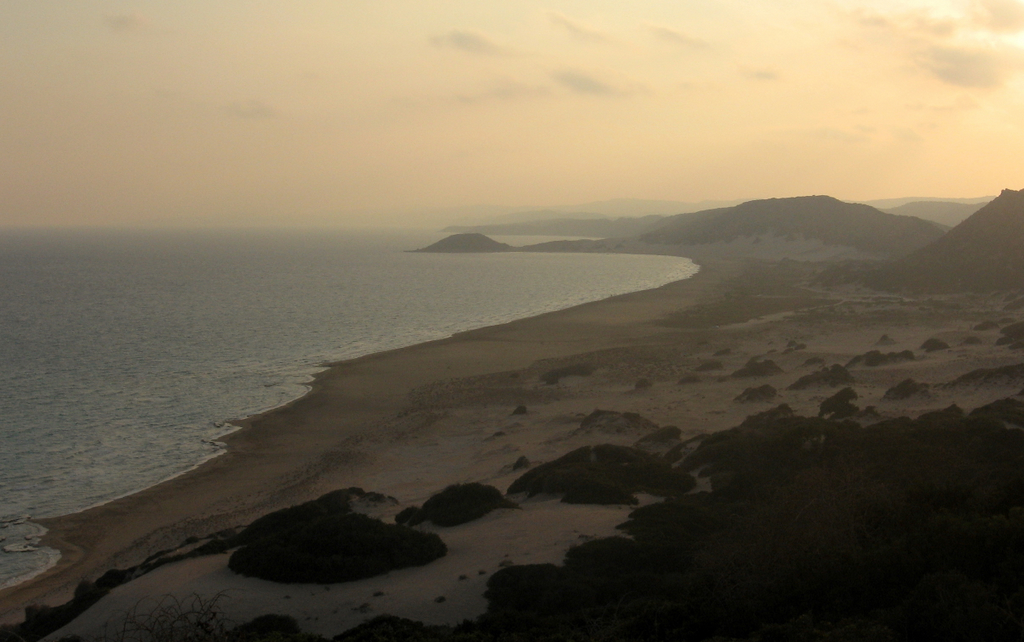
The Golden Beach at sunset

Turkish Cypriot Dipkarpaz Sports Club was founded in 1978; its football team in 2015 played in Cyprus Turkish Football Association (CTFA) K-PET 2nd League. Education in the town includes a primary school and the Recep Tayyip Erdogan Secondary School. The town hosts some small tourist facilities. Twenty kilometres (12 mi) east lies Golden Beach, a pristine 4 km (2.5 mi) long beach, and the Apostolos Andreas Monastery.

== International relations ==
=== Twin towns – sister cities ===
Rizokarpaso is twinned with:

- Ankara, Turkey (since 1986)
- Pendik, Istanbul, Turkey (since 1986)
- Yasamal, Baku, Azerbaijan (since 2005)
- Ardeşen, Rize, Turkey
- Tatvan, Bitlis, Turkey

== See also ==
- Rizokarpaso Primary School
- Kormakitis
