= Karpasia (town) =

Ancient town in Cyprus

Coordinates: 35°35′47″N 34°22′41″E

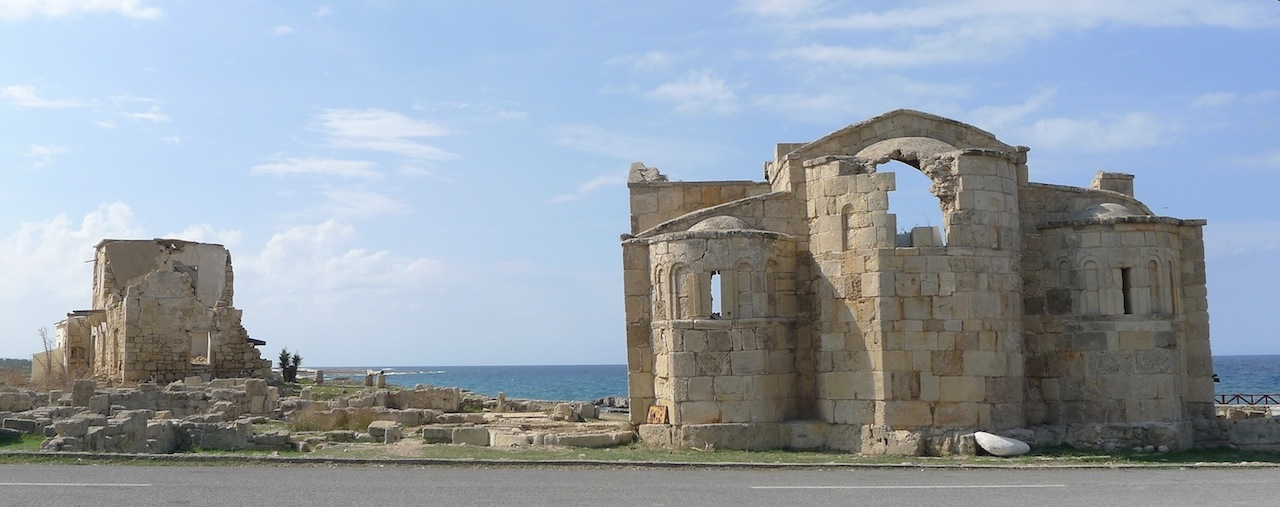
Ayios Philon Church, situated at the site of Karpasia. The remains of the 5th century basilica can be seen as stones (not the building) to the left of this picture.

Karpasia (Ancient Greek: Καρπάσεια and Καρπασία), Latinized as Carpasia, and also known as Karpasion (sometimes mistaken for Karpathos), was an ancient town in Cyprus, situated on the northern shore of the Karpas Peninsula, 3 km (1.9 mi) from the modern town of Rizokarpaso. Dionysius, the epic poet who composed the Bassarica, gives the name as Krapaseia (Κραπάσεια).

According to tradition, Karpasia was founded by Pygmalion, as reported by Hellanicus of Lesbos in his Cypriaca. It had a harbour, whose moles remain visible to this day.

According to archaeological evidence, the earliest possible date for the foundation of the town is the 7th century BC. It was first mentioned in literature in 399 BC. The town was mentioned by the writers of antiquity, including Strabo. The city is also mentioned in the Hellenica Oxyrhynchia, which is a history of ancient Greece known from papyrus fragments. In 306 BC, the town was the site of landing for Demetrius I of Macedon, whose forces stormed Karpasia and the neighbouring town of Urania, before proceeding to Salamis.

The architectural style as well as the techniques used in building the stone houses of the town incorporated elements of Phoenician influence.

In the Delphic Theorodochoi inscription (230 BC), which was published by André Plassart, there is a mention of a Karpasian man who was named Aristostratos (Ancient Greek: Ἀριστόστρατος).

Its first known bishop, Philo of Carpasia, was ordained by Epiphanius of Salamis in the 4th century; he left a commentary on the Song of Songs, a letter to a monk Eucarpios (also found as Bail, Letter 42), and some fragments. Another bishop of the see, Hermolaus, was present at the Council of Chalcedon in 451 AD. The chroniclers mention the names of three other bishops, and a fourth occurs on a seal, all without dates. Another is quoted in the "Constitutio Cypria" of Pope Alexander IV (1260). No longer a residential bishopric, Karpasia is today used by the Roman Catholic Church as a titular see.
