= Golden Beach, Cyprus =

Beach at Karpaz peninsula, Cyprus

Golden Beach (Cyprus)
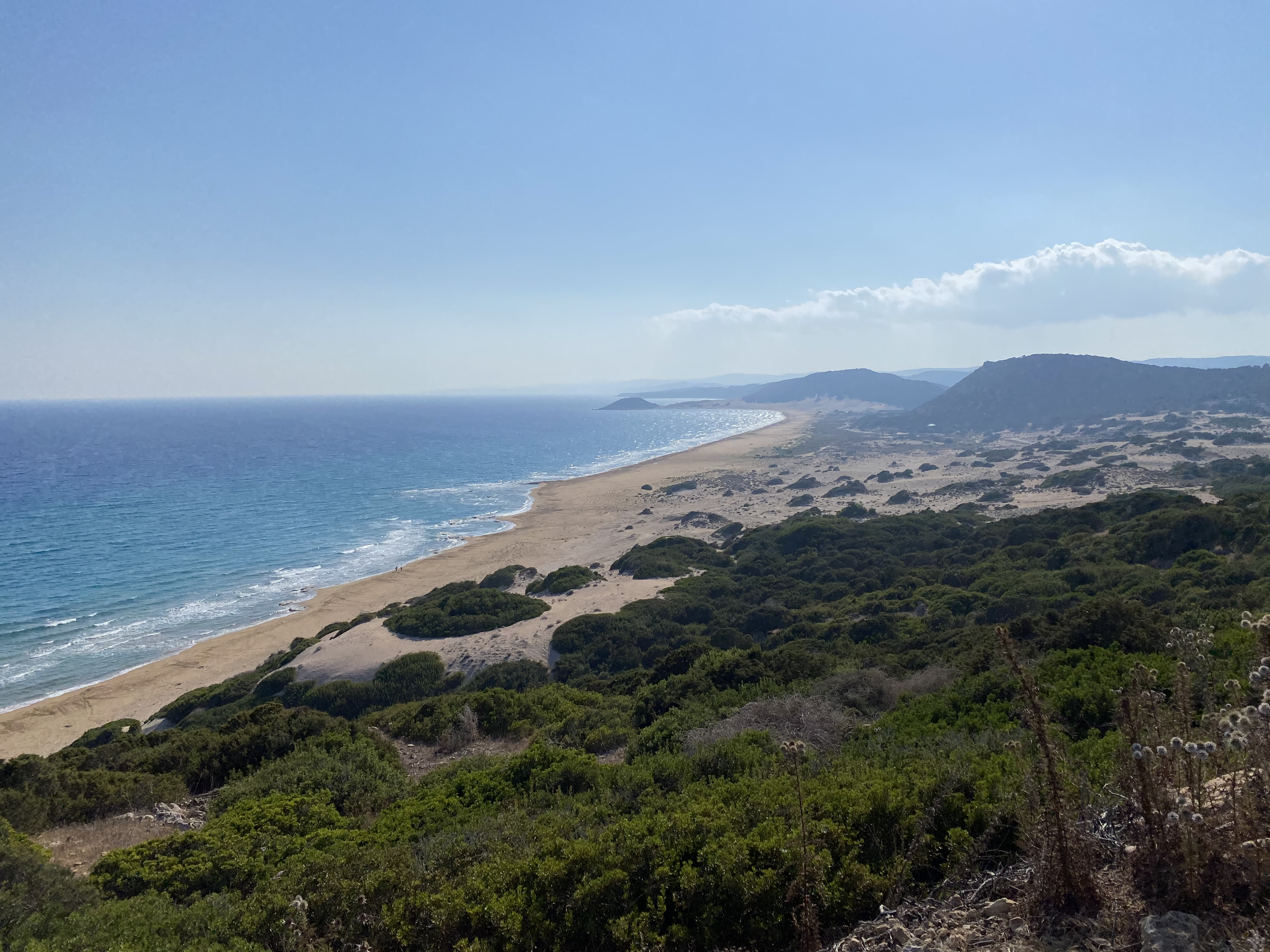
- Golden Beach, seen from Galunopetra top

- Location within Cyprus
- Coordinates: 35.64108°N 34.54402°E
- Ocean/sea sources: Mediterranean Sea
- Basin countries: Cyprus (de jure); Northern Cyprus (de facto)

The Golden Beach (Turkish: Altın Kumsal; Greek: Ναγγομὶ, romanized: Nangomi, also known as Greek: Χρυσή Ακτή, romanized: Chrysí Actí (ellenization of the Turkish name), and Pashi Amos ("Fat Sand Beach")) is a wide sand beach, located near Rizokarpaso in the Karpass Peninsula

It stretches about four kilometers from Galunopetra (Iyitaş) cape on the east to Jyles cape on the south-west. On the eastern part, the dunes extend up to 500m towards the inland. The beach area is separated into two sections by a small hill, Adatepe, and by a large light colored sand dune without vegetation.

The Golden Beach is, along with other sand beaches in Karpaz, an important nesting area for sea turtles. Camping on the beach and the surrounding protection areas is strictly forbidden. The Golden Beach is also known as an unofficial nudist beach (areas on the west of the beach)

== History ==
In the first years after the Turkish Invasion of Cyprus in 1974 the Golden Beach and the tip of the Karpaz peninsular were under Turkish military control and access was restricted. After the unilateral independence declaration in 1983, the area became a natural park and protection was further strengthened in 1997 and 1998 TRNC Environment Law

Since 1990, the forestry department of the TRNC allowed small restaurants and wooden chalets for overnight stays in a few areas around Golden Beach. With growing environmental awareness and protection zones following Natura 2000 standards, the rental contracts were revoked and operators were brought to court in 2013 for failing to clean the area. In 2016 the TRNC supreme court confirmed previous court decisions and ordered the bungalows, restaurants and sanitary facilities to be demolished by June 2016, which finally happened only a year later. The move was applauded by environmentalists; however the former operators criticised the decision and argued that without them, nobody would clean the beach and the lack of sanitation facilities would cause issues for beachgoers and the nature. Currently, there is no construction left on the beach itself, although there is still one restaurant on the eastern side on the hill overseeing the beach area.

== Access ==
The Golden Beach is located next to a coastal road that leads from the village of Rizokarpaso/Dipkarpaz to Apostolos Andreas Monastery and the tip of the peninsular. The beach is about 20 km from the village centre and 9 km from the monastery. The road is paved, however in bad condition with occasional potholes; the last hundred meters on the way to the parking space are unpaved. During the high season the Golden Beach has been one of the stops of a regular bus connection (Karpaz-Express) which serves Kyrenia and several sights-seeing spots in the Karpaz area. This bus connection is currently discontinued, though. Tourist busses used to stop for one or two hours at the beach.
