= Cape Apostolos Andreas =

Northeasternmost point of Cyprus

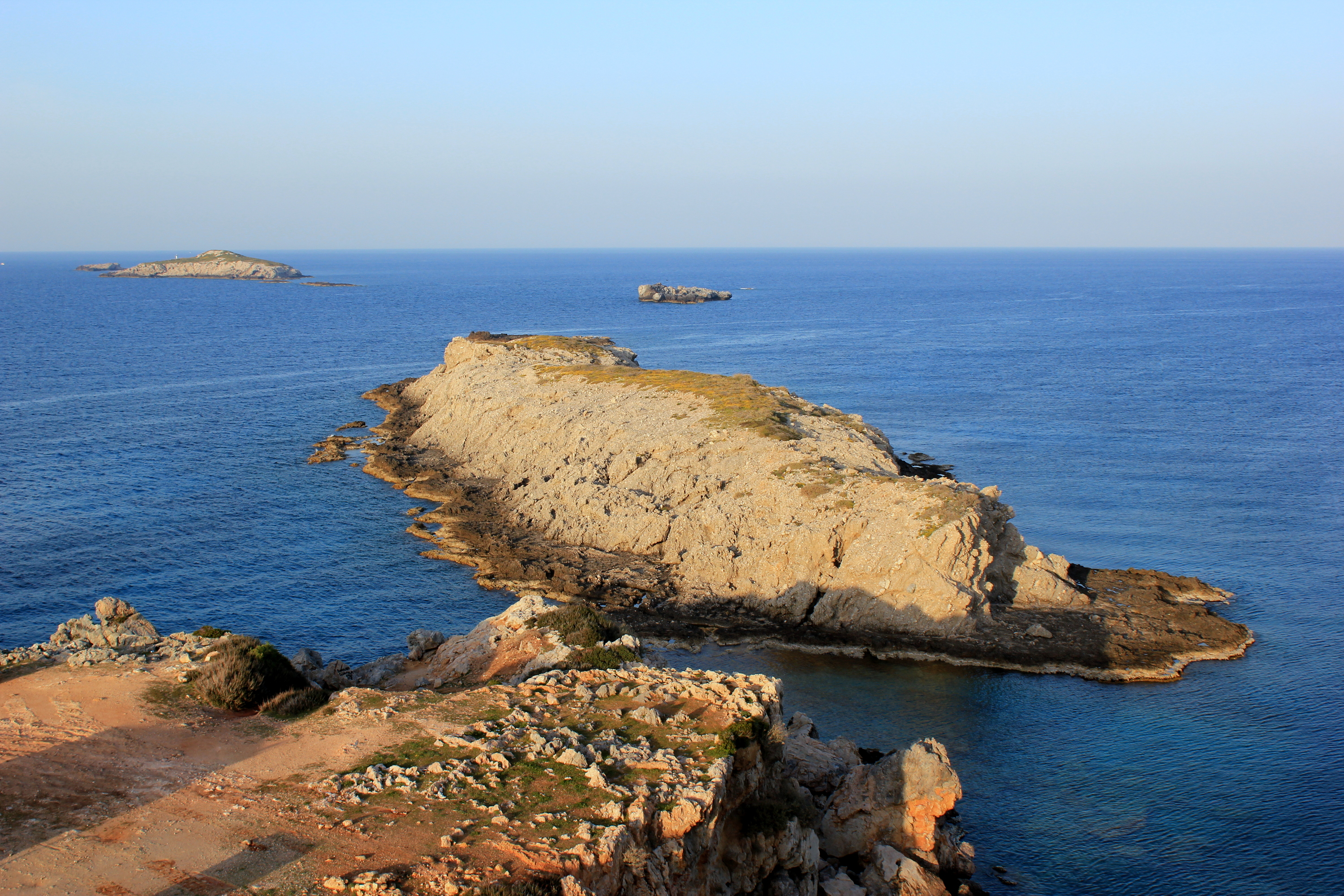
Cape Apostolos Andreas

Cape Apostolos Andreas (Greek: Ακρωτήριο Αποστόλου Ανδρέα, "Cape Saint Andrew"; Turkish: Zafer Burnu, "Cape Victory") is the north-easternmost point (promontory) of the Mediterranean island of Cyprus (35°41.70′N 34°35.20′E). It lies at the tip of the finger-like Karpas Peninsula.

The Apostolos Andreas Monastery is located 5 km southwest of the promontory itself.

The city of Latakia in Syria is located about 68 miles (109 km) to the east.

Herodotus mentions it as "Keys of Cyprus", where the Phoenicians were sailing with their ships in a war between Darius I and the Ionians.
