= Karpas Peninsula =

Peninsula on the island of Cyprus

Coordinates: 35°31′40″N 34°16′38″E

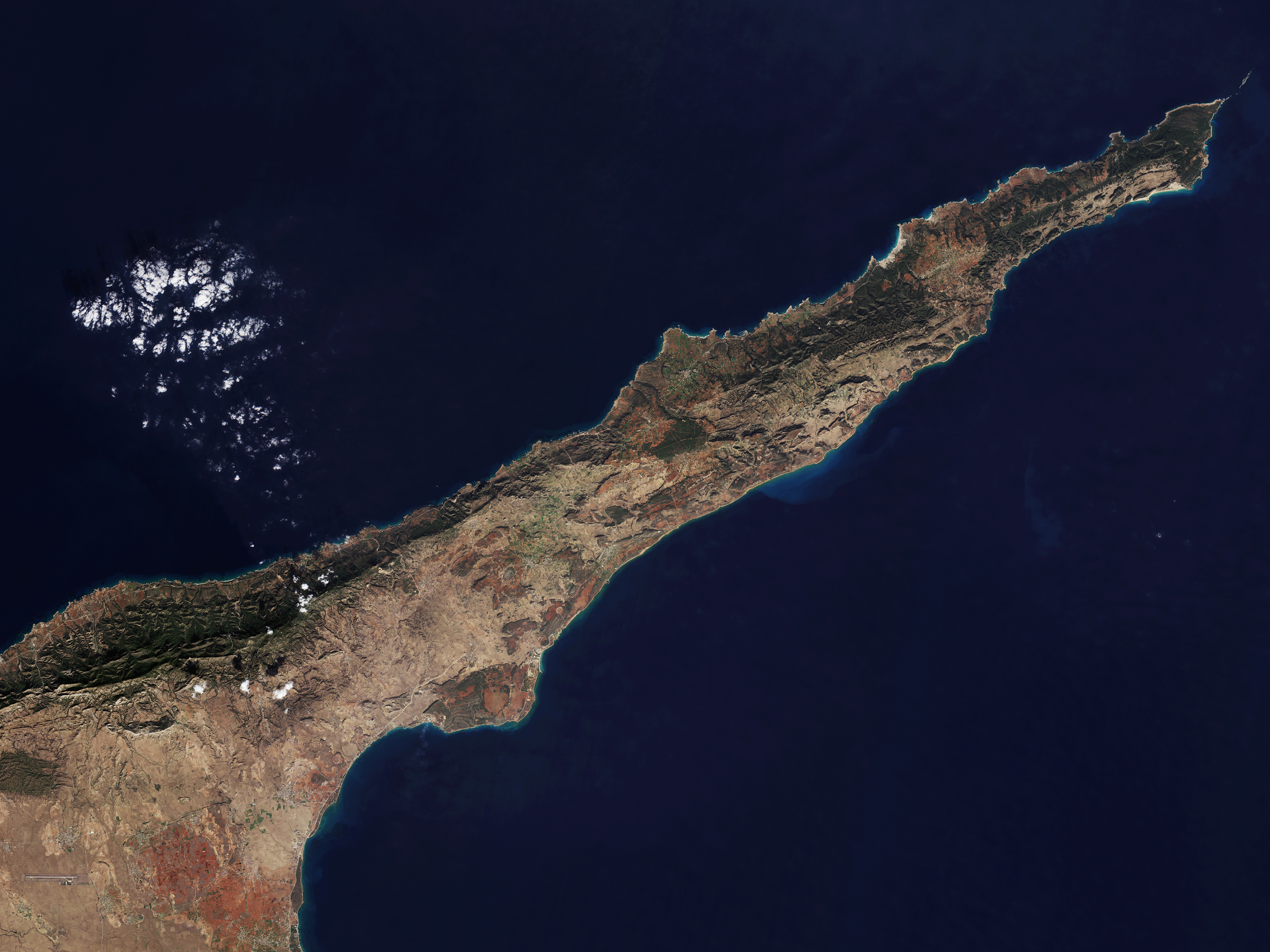
The Karpas Peninsula as seen from space.

The Karpas Peninsula (Greek: Καρπασία, romanized: Karpasía; Turkish: Karpaz), also known as the Karpass, Karpaz or Karpasia, is a long, finger-like peninsula that is one of the most prominent geographical features of the island of Cyprus. Its farthest extent is Cape Apostolos Andreas, and its major population centre is the town of Rizokarpaso (Greek: Ριζοκάρπασο; Turkish: Dipkarpaz). It is currently under the de facto control of the internationally-unrecognised state of Northern Cyprus.

== Mythology ==
Teucer first landed on a beach in the Karpas Peninsula known as the "Beach of the Achaeans" (Ἀχαιῶν ἀκτή; Achaion Akte), after being banished by his father, Telamon. He subsequently settled in Cyprus, where he founded the city of Salamis. The beach is also mentioned in the geographical works Stadiasmus of the Great Sea and Geography (Ptolemy).

== Geography ==
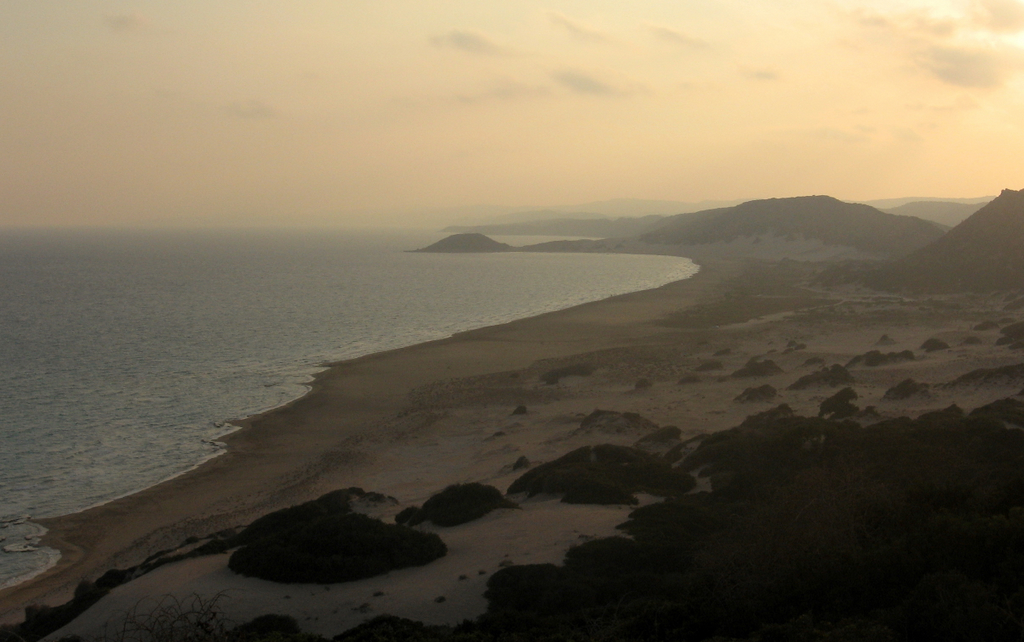
Golden Beach on the Karpas Peninsula, at sunset

It covers an area of 898 km^{2}, making up 27% of the territory of Northern Cyprus. It is much less densely populated than the average of Northern Cyprus, with a population density of 26 people per km^{2} in 2010. The town of Trikomo (İskele), the district capital, is considered to be the "gateway" and the geographical starting point of the peninsula, along with the neighboring village of Bogazi (Boğaz). Apart from Trikomo, the most important towns and municipalities in the area are Yialousa, Galateia, Rizokarpaso, Komi Kebir and Akanthou.

The peninsula hosts a number of historical sites such as Kantara Castle and Apostolos Andreas Monastery, as well as the ruins of Agia Trias Basilica and the ancient cities of Karpasia and Aphendrika among numerous others.

There are more than 46 sandy beaches in the peninsula, which are the primary Eastern Mediterranean nesting grounds for the loggerhead (Caretta caretta) and green sea turtles (Chelonia mydas). The Golden Beach is situated around 15 km from the town of Rizokarpaso and is considered one of the finest and most remote beaches of Cyprus. It is one of the least tourist-frequented beaches in the island. The Karpas Peninsula is home to the Karpas donkey, known as a symbol of Cyprus; there are campaigns carried out jointly by Turkish and Greek Cypriots to conserve the rare donkeys of the peninsula.

== Activities ==
Most of the activities in the Karpas Peninsula are related to agriculture, fishing, hunting, and some to micro-tourism. Local farmers take advantage of this natural environment to grow different fruits and vegetables mostly as sub-subsistence farming (although for local commerce too). The region is mostly known for its karpuz (Turkish for "watermelon"). Several tourist businesses can be found in the town of Rizokarpaso. These are generally restaurants serving traditional Turkish-Cypriot Cuisine, including meze.

Due to its geographical position, the Karpas Peninsula is somewhat protected from human interference. This makes it a pristine natural environment, home to many inland and marine species. When hunting season starts, the Karpas's forests are a popular location to go hunting for partridges. Meanwhile, the coastal region, with its clear waters, moderate northern currents, and rocky bottom with cave-like structures, is home to two of the most highly valued fish species: the orfoz (dusky grouper) and lahos (Epinepheluses). The price per kilogram of each species ranges from 35-80 Turkish lira, depending on the location and the season. However, fishing rates in the Karpas region and most of North Cyprus dramatically decreased last century because of the use of dynamite. This is why the Zafer Burunu (the tip of the peninsula) is now a protected natural heritage area, where marine species are slowly recovering to healthy population parameters.

== Gallery ==
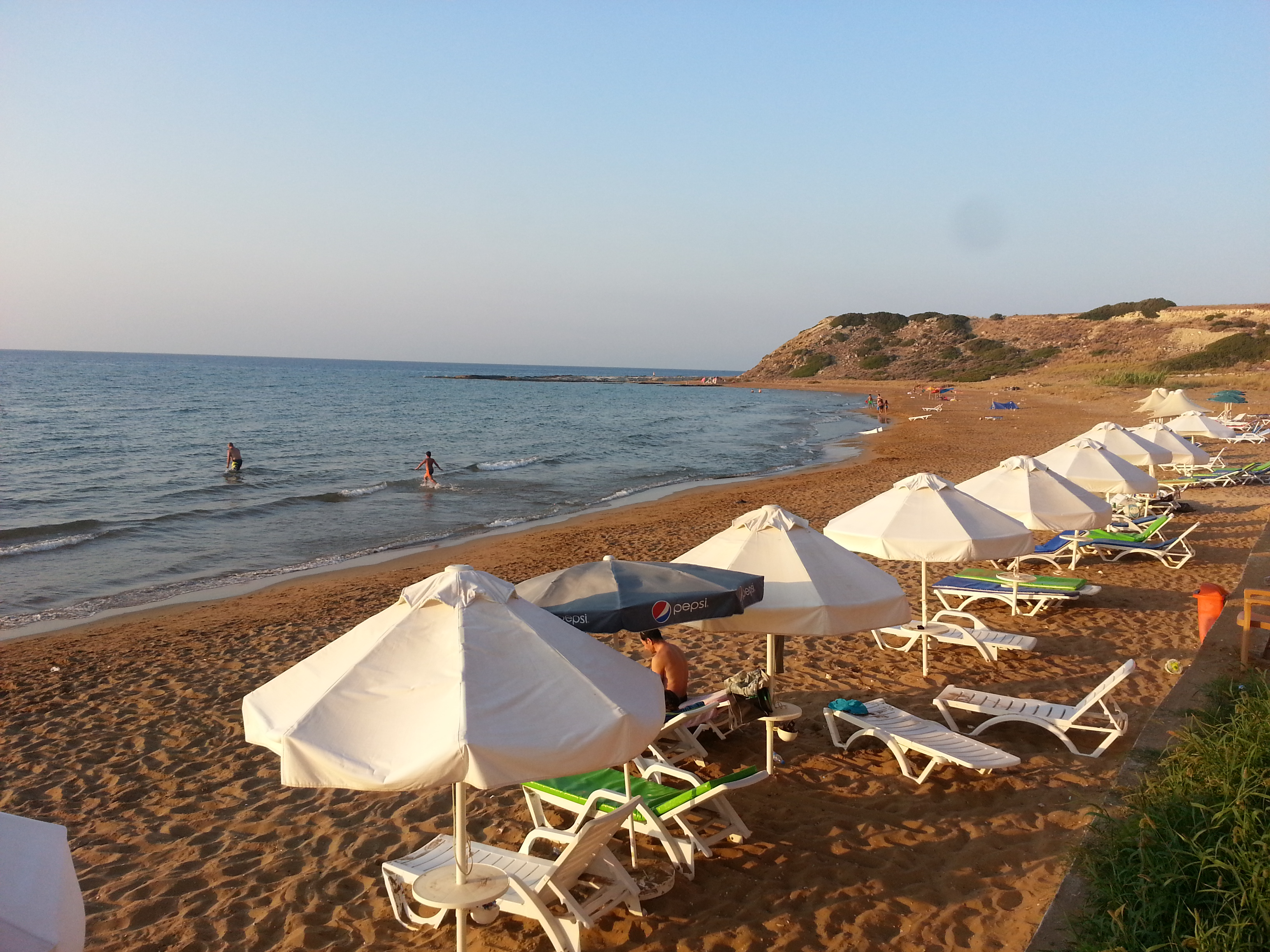
A beach in Davlos

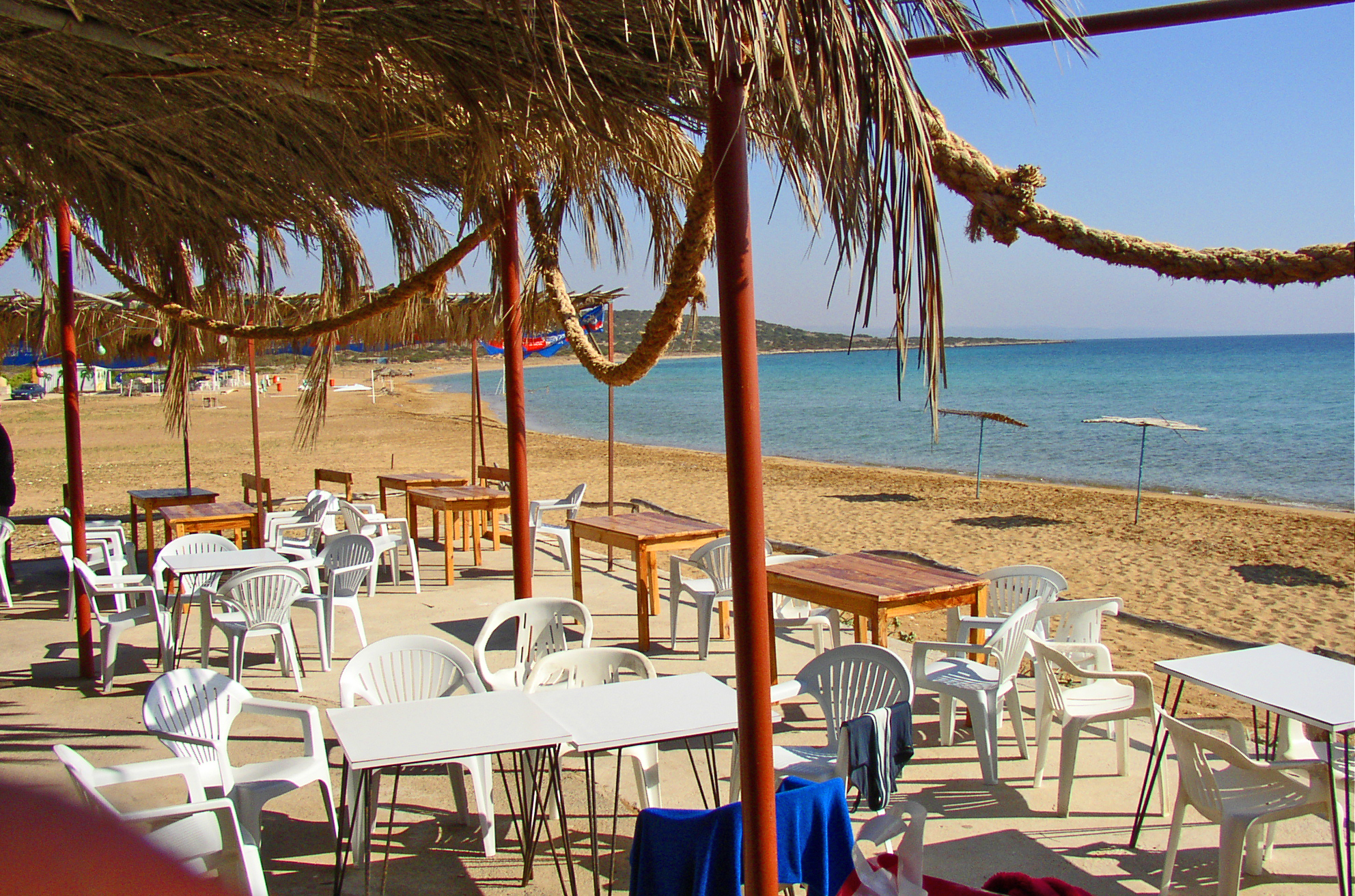
A beach in Galateia

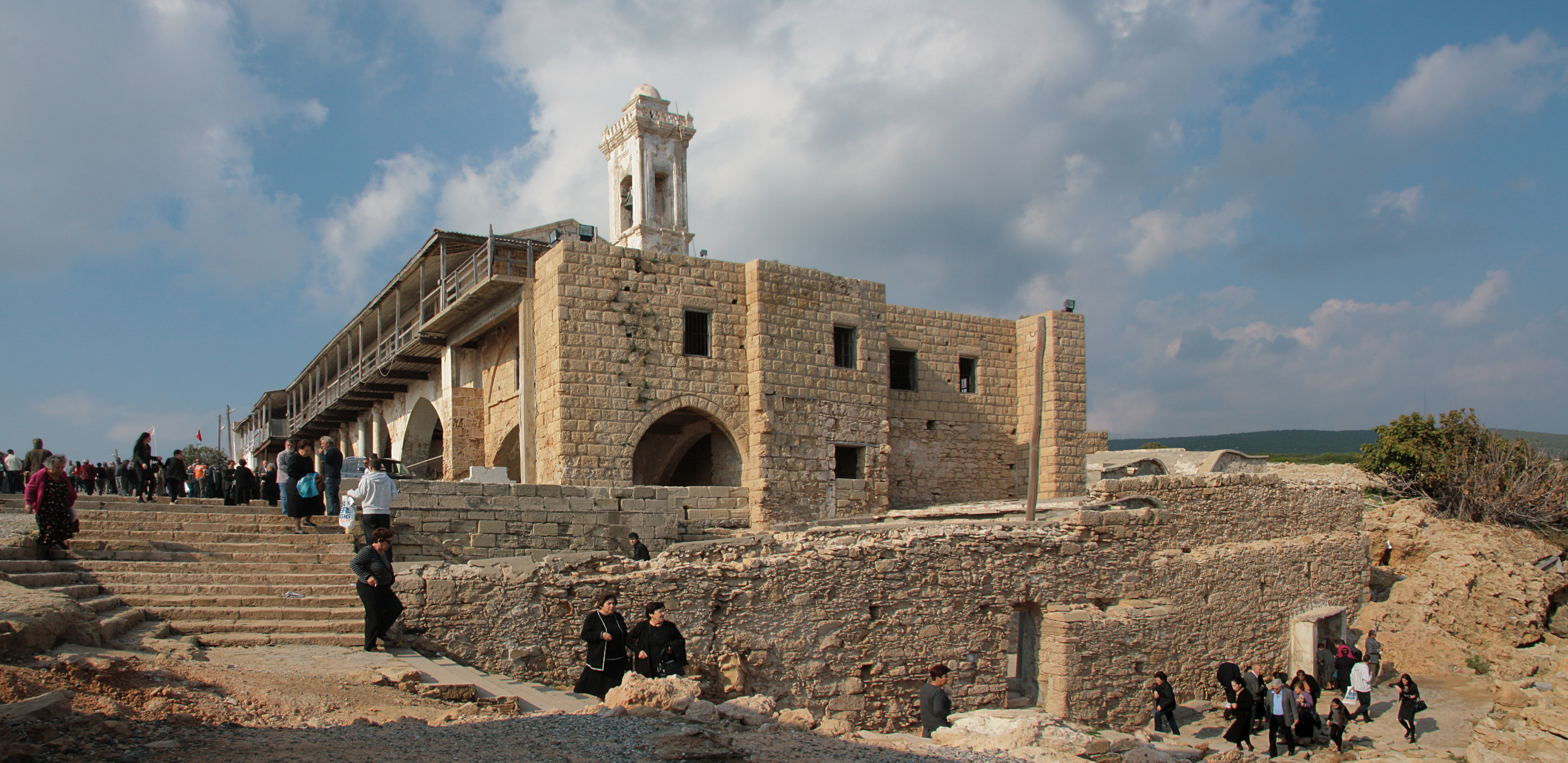
Apostolos Andreas Monastery

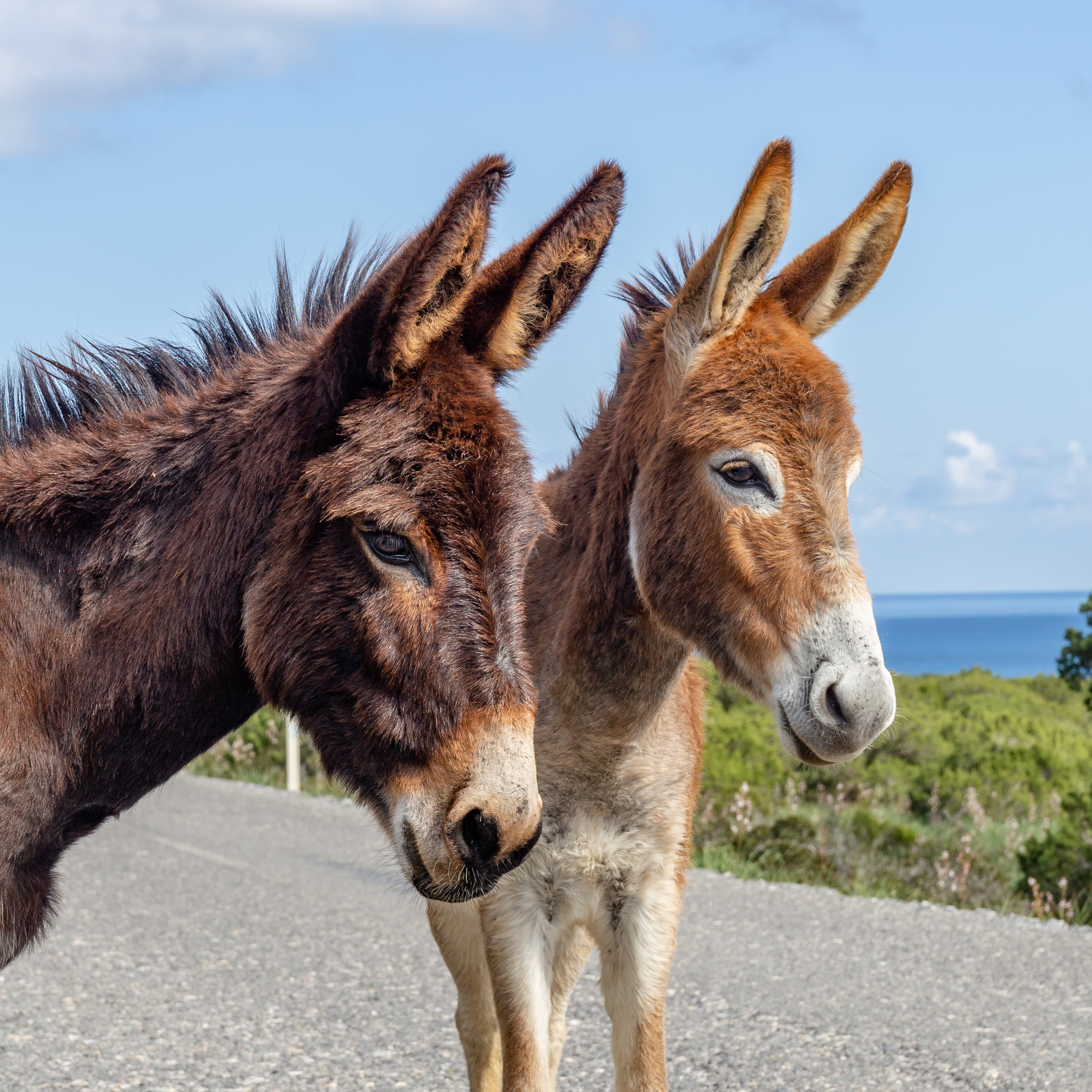
Two Karpas donkeys

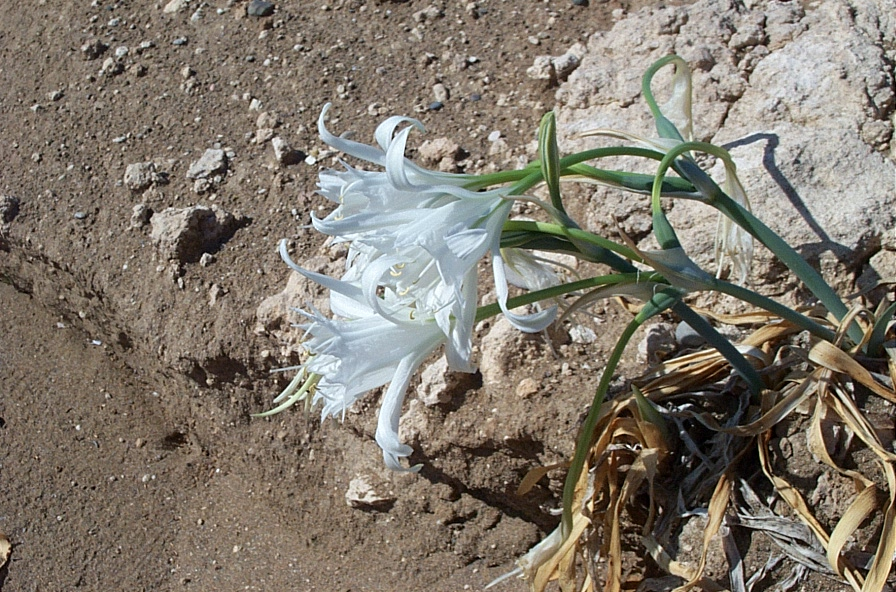
A sand lily on the Karpas Peninsula

== See also ==
- Ayios Theodoros Karpasias
- List of peninsulas
