= İskele District =

District of Northern Cyprus

Coordinates: 35.2875°N 33.8917°E

Location of İskele district within Northern Cyprus.

İskele District (Turkish: İskele İlçesi) is a district in Northern Cyprus. It is divided into three sub-districts: İskele Sub-district, Mehmetçik Sub-district and Yialousa Sub-district. Its capital is Trikomo, also known by its Turkish name, İskele. Its population was 23,098 in the 2011 census. Its Governor is Bünyamin Merhametsiz.

The district was separated from Gazimağusa District in 1998.

== Gallery ==
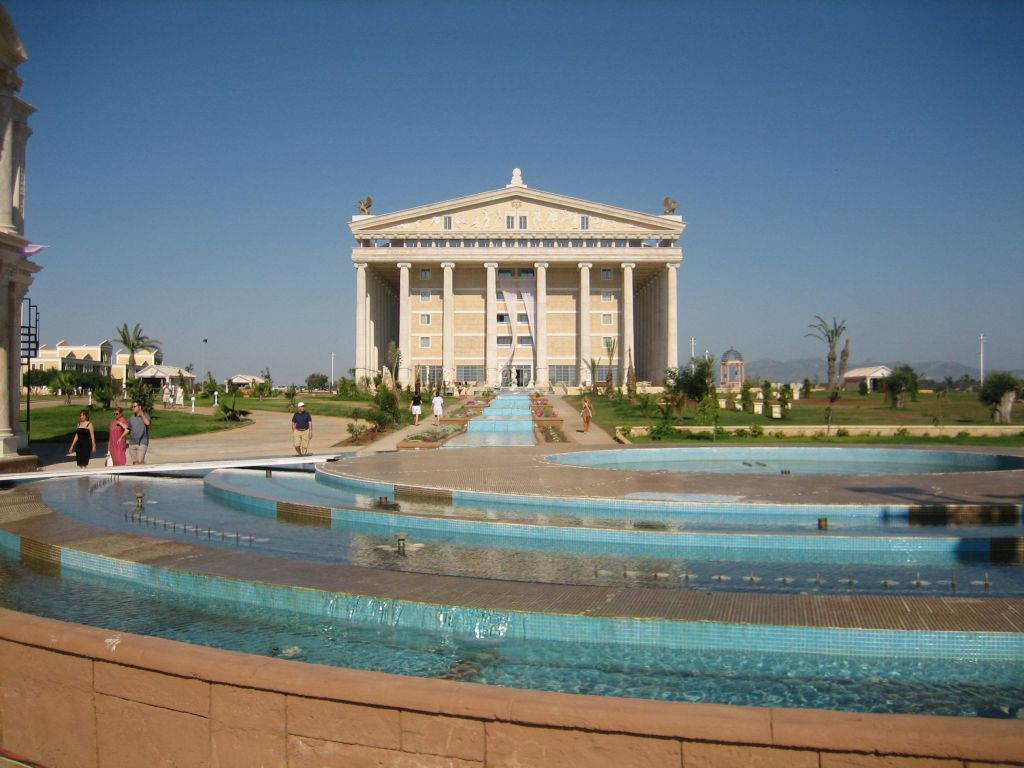
Kaya Artemis Hotel in Bafra Tourism Region

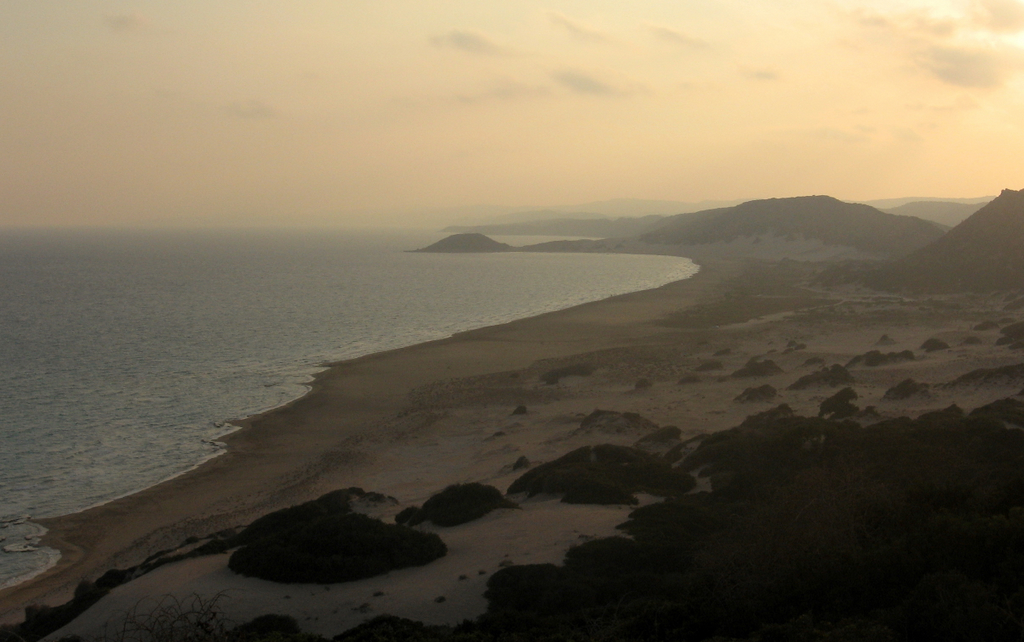
Golden Beach at Karpasia Peninsula, at sunset
