= Agios Theodoros =

Agios Theodoros may refer to:

- Agios Theodoros, Famagusta, Cyprus
- Agios Theodoros, Kozani, Greece
- Agios Theodoros, Larnaca, Cyprus
- Agios Theodoros, Limassol, Cyprus
- Agios Theodoros, Nicosia, Cyprus
- Ayios Theodoros Karpasias, Cyprus
- Agios Theodoros Tilliria, Cyprus
