= Koutrafas =

Koutrafas may refer to:

- Kato Koutrafas, Cyprus
- Pano Koutrafas, Cyprus
