= Xyliatos =

Xyliatos: Ξυλιάτος (Greek); Ksilyatos (Turkish)
- Village
- Location in Cyprus
- Coordinates: 35°1′44″N 33°2′29″E
- Country: Cyprus
- District: Nicosia District

Population (2001)
  - Total: 123
- Time zone: UTC+2 (EET)
  - Summer (DST): UTC+3 (EEST)

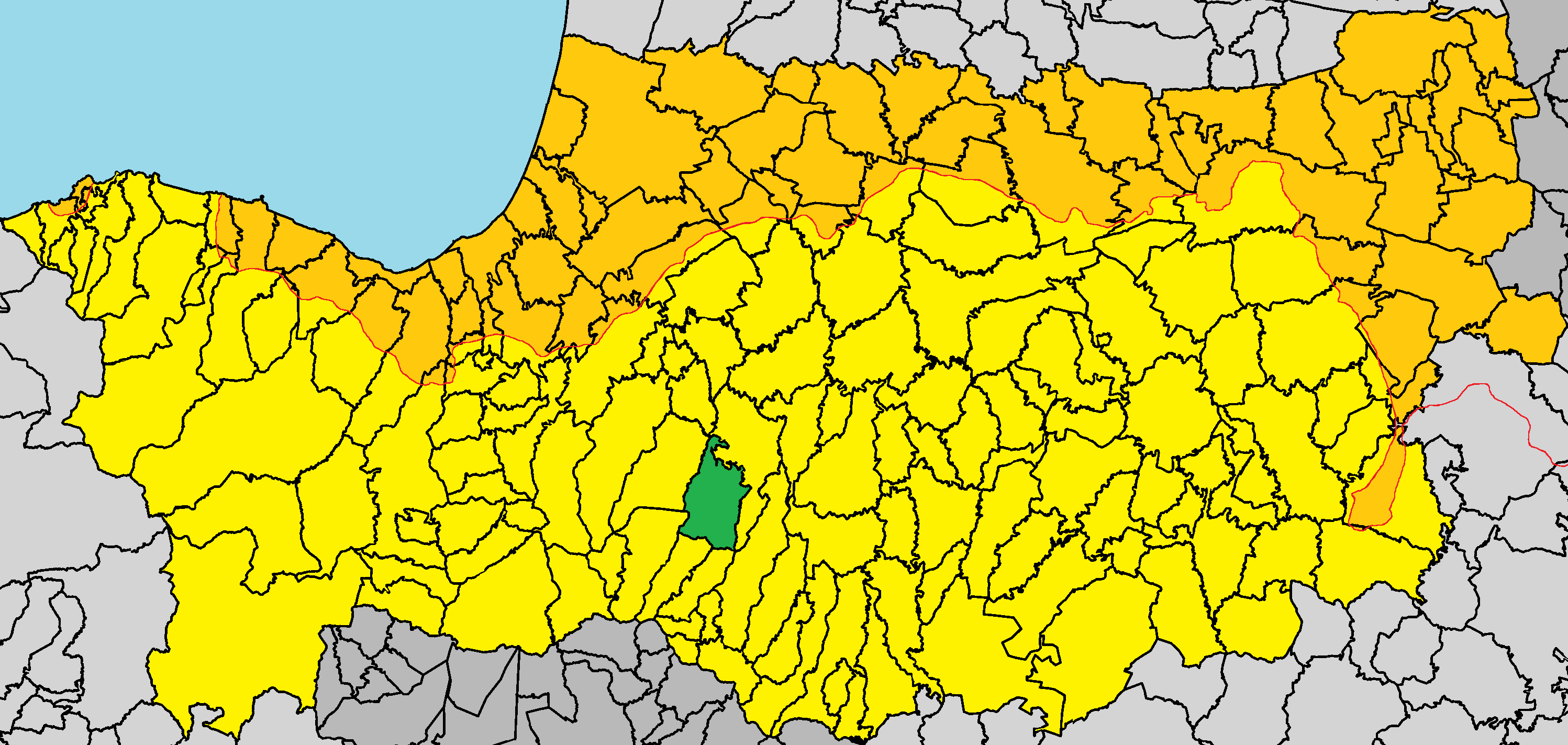

Xyliatos (Greek: Ξυλιάτος; Turkish: Ksilyatos) is a village in the Nicosia District of Cyprus, located 4 km southwest of Agia Marina.
