= Mosfileri =

Mosfileri: Μοσφιλερή (Greek); Mosfili (Turkish)
- Village
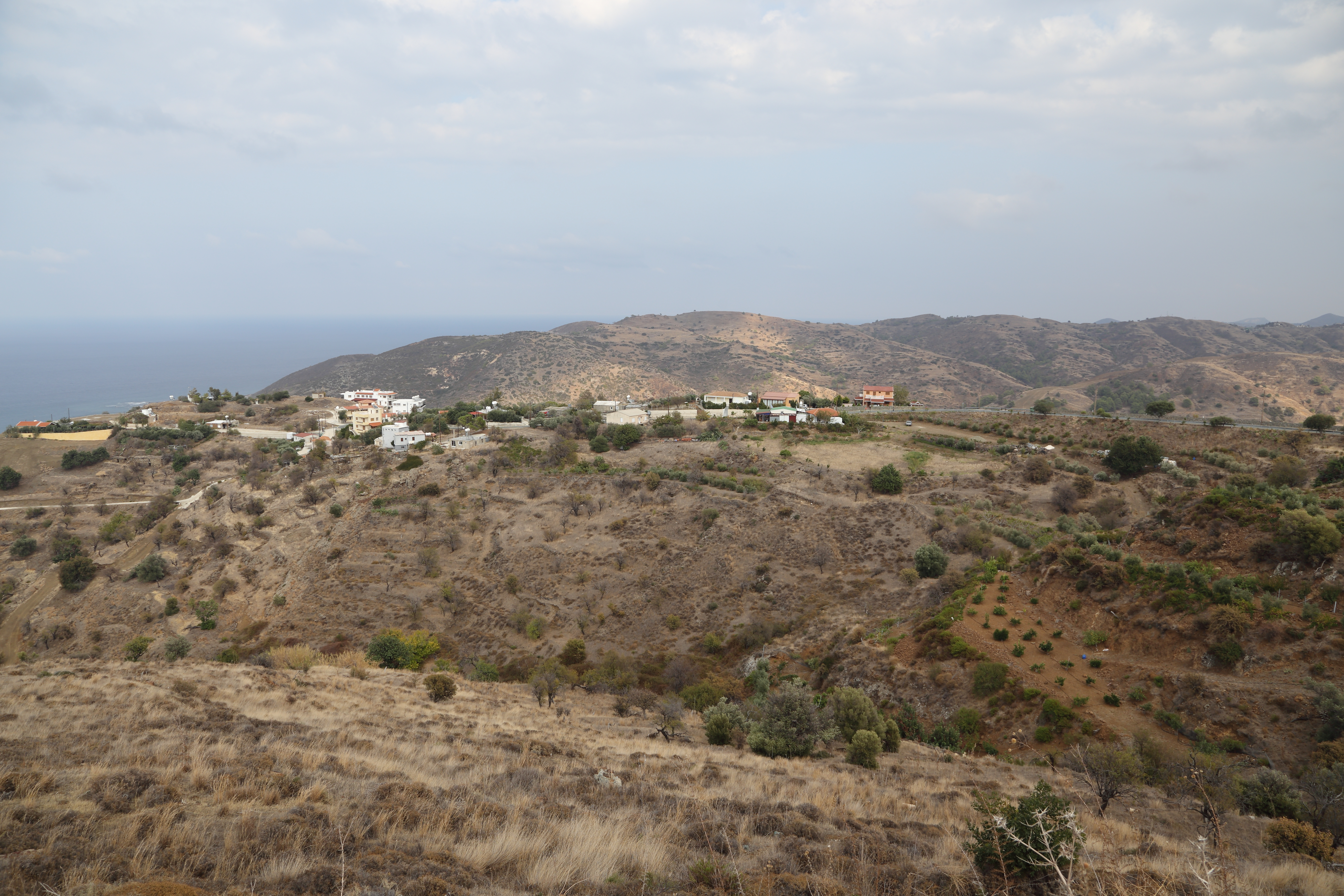

- Location in Cyprus
- Coordinates: 35°10′48″N 32°37′55″E
- Country: Cyprus
- District: Nicosia District
- Time zone: UTC+2 (EET)
  - Summer (DST): UTC+3 (EEST)

Mosfileri (Greek: Μοσφιλερή; Turkish: Mosfili) is a small village in the Nicosia District of Cyprus, just east of the Kokkina exclave. It is part of the Pigenia municipality. It is also known as Mosfili (Greek: Μοσφίλι).
