= Agios Georgios, Nicosia =

Agios Georgios: Άγιος Γεώργιος (Greek); Aya Yeoryos (Turkish)
- Village
- Location in Cyprus
- Coordinates: 35°6′N 33°5′E
- Country: Cyprus
- District: Nicosia District
- Time zone: UTC+2 (EET)
  - Summer (DST): UTC+3 (EEST)

Agios Georgios (Greek: Άγιος Γεώργιος; Turkish: Aya Yeoryos) is a village located in the Nicosia District of Cyprus, near the town of Agia Marina.
