= Kaliana =

Kaliana: Καλλιάνα (Greek); Kalyana (Turkish)
- Village
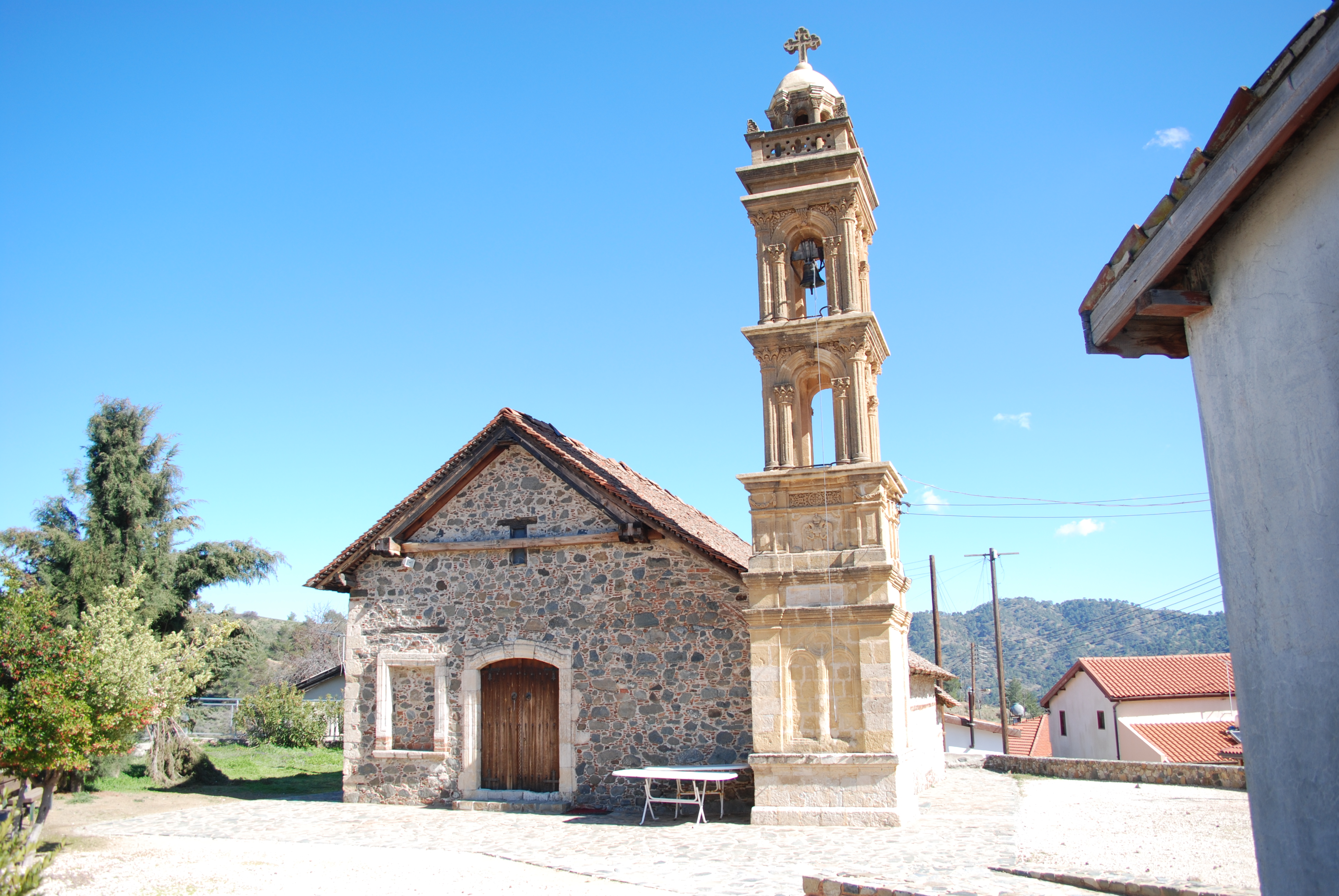
- Church of Ioakim and Anna

- Location in Cyprus
- Coordinates: 35°0′41″N 32°53′1″E
- Country: Cyprus
- District: Nicosia District

Population (2001)
  - Total: 177
- Time zone: UTC+2 (EET)
  - Summer (DST): UTC+3 (EEST)
- Website: www.kaliana.org.cy

Kaliana (Greek: Καλλιάνα; Turkish: Kalyana) is a village in the Nicosia District of Cyprus, located 3 km south of Temvria.
