= Agios Epifanios Soleas =

Agios Epifanios: Άγιος Επιφάνιος Σολέας (Greek); Aybifan (Turkish)
- Village
- Location in Cyprus
- Coordinates: 35°03′56″N 32°52′51″E
- Country: Cyprus
- District: Nicosia District

Population (2001)
  - Total: 207 (together with Linou)
- Time zone: UTC+2 (EET)
  - Summer (DST): UTC+3 (EEST)

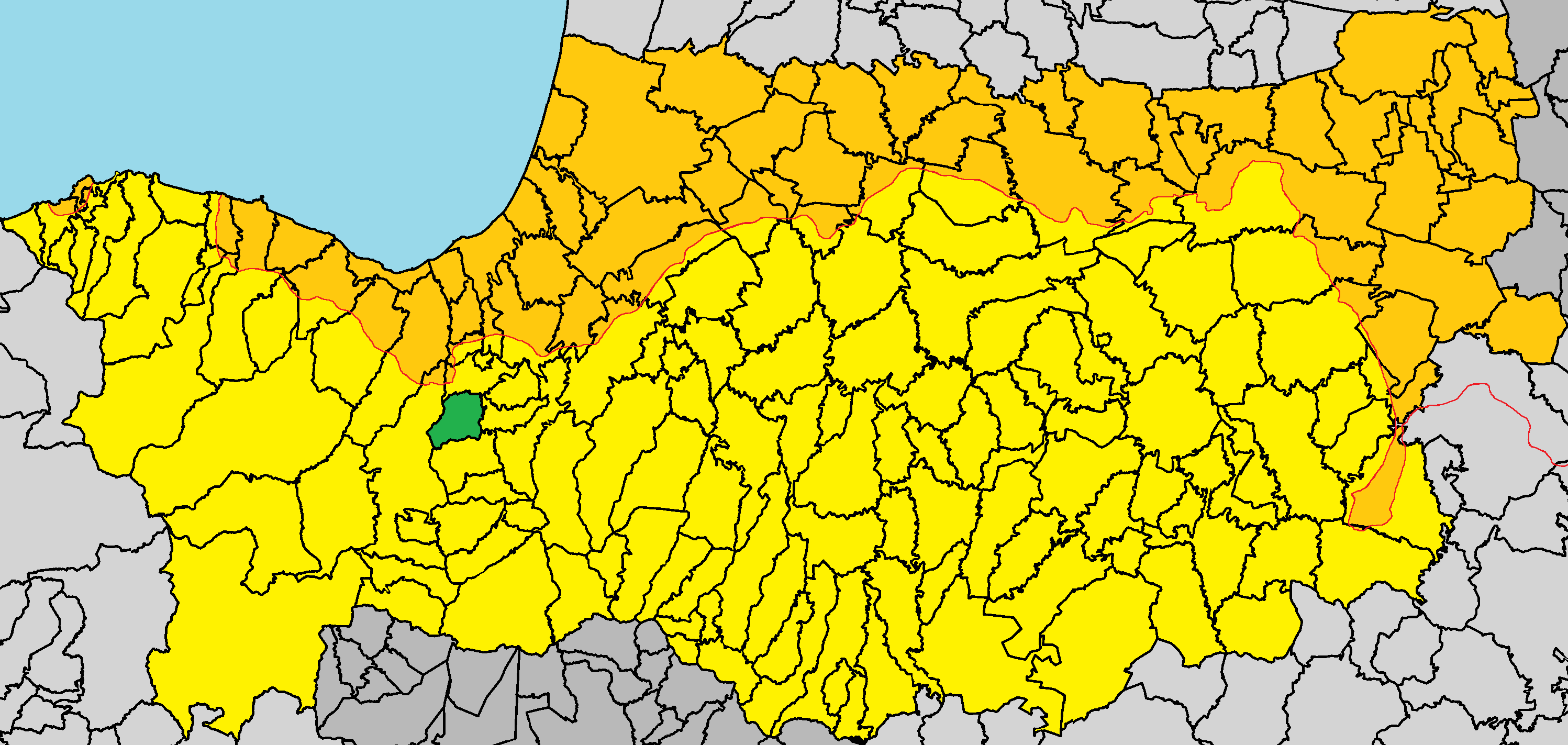
Location of Agios Epifanios Soleas within the Nicosia District

Agios Epifanios (Greek: Άγιος Επιφάνιος Σολέας, Turkish: Aybifan) is a village in the Nicosia District of Cyprus, located 3 km west of Linou. Prior to 1974, the village was inhabited primarily by Turkish Cypriots. Today the village is very insignificantly populated.
