= Tsakistra =

Tsakistras: Τσακίστρα (Greek); Çakistra (Turkish)
- Village
- Location in Cyprus
- Coordinates: 35°1′1″N 32°43′22″E
- Country: Cyprus
- District: Nicosia District

Government
  - Type: Κοινοτικό Συμβούλιο Τσακίτσρας
  - Κοινοτάρχης: Χριστόδουλος Ορφανίδης

Population (2011)
  - Total: 79
- Time zone: UTC+2 (EET)
  - Summer (DST): UTC+3 (EEST)

Tsakistra (Greek: Τσακίστρα; Turkish: Çakistra) is a village in the Nicosia District of Cyprus, located 3 km south of Kampos.
