= Agios Epifanios Oreinis =

Agios Epifanios: Αγιος Επιφάνιος (Greek); Aybifan (Turkish)
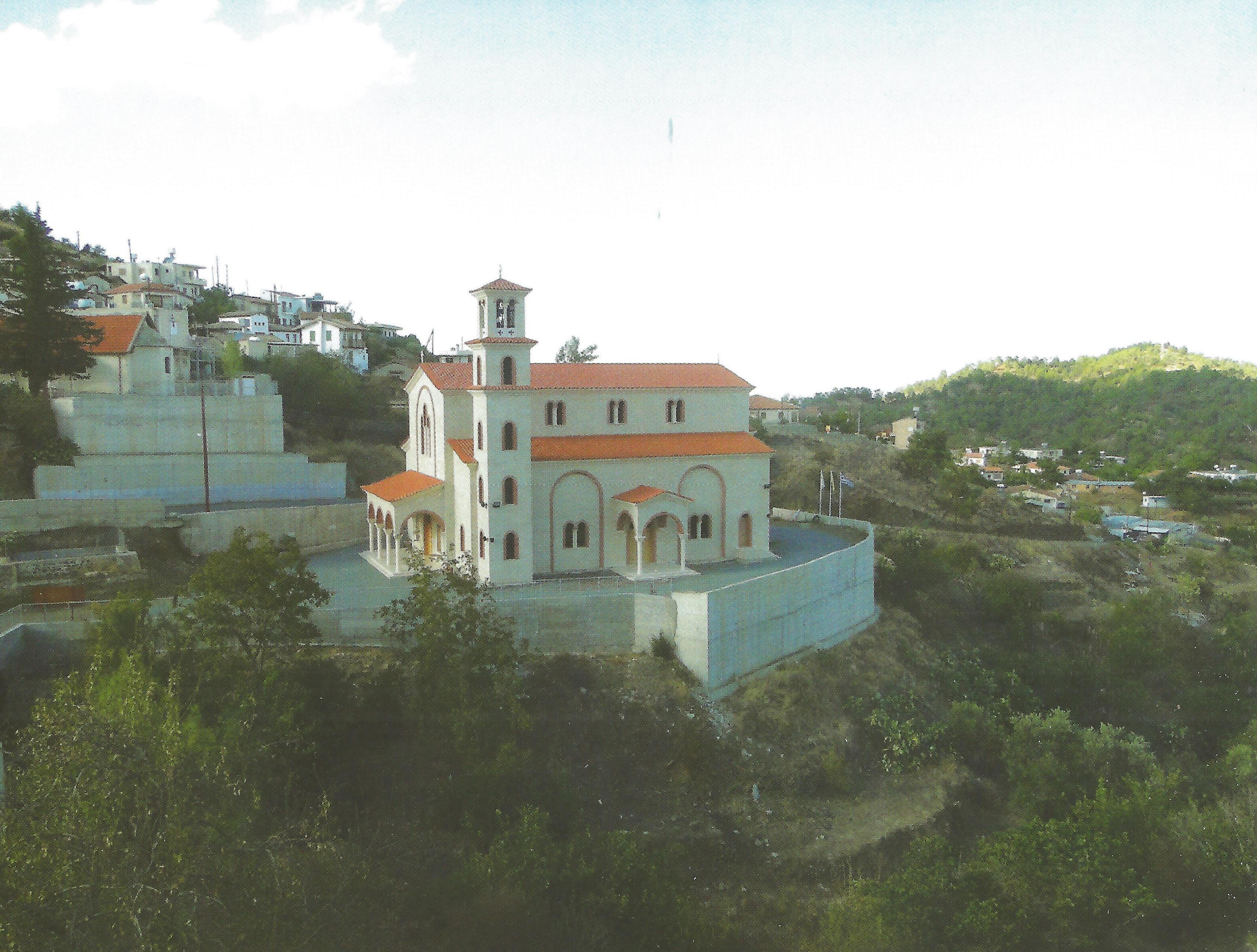
- Ayios Epifanios new church

- Location in Cyprus
- Coordinates: 34°59′43″N 33°7′12″E
- Country: Cyprus
- District: Nicosia District

Population (2001)
  - Total: 338
- Time zone: UTC+2 (EET)
  - Summer (DST): UTC+3 (EEST)

Agios Epifanios (Greek: Άγιος Επιφάνιος; Turkish: Aybifan) is a village in the Nicosia District of Cyprus, located 5 km southwest of Klirou.

== History ==
The village of Agios Epifanios was initially created by the unification of ostracized groups that moved during the critical period of transition to Christianity. Many pagans took refuge to the mountains in order to avoid oppressions. In a move to end the destruction and political chaos, Epiphanius of Salamis amended protective areas for those who choose not to convert to Christianity. These areas were marked for believers and not believers. At the time, the non-believers territory was called the "Apistilia" in (Greek: η περιοχή των απίστων). Most of these protective zones were in the mountains. The region now known as Pitsilia region and those who chose not to convert to Christianity were ostracized there.

According to legend among the earliest inhabitants of this village were a mother and three daughters (family of a pagan high priest) within the vicinity.

During the Bloody Christmas, 66 Turks left the village.
