= Mora, Cyprus =

Mora: Μόρα (Greek); Meriç (Turkish)
- Village
- Location in Cyprus
- Coordinates: 35°10′27″N 33°32′43″E
- Country (de jure): Cyprus
  - District: Nicosia District
- Country (de facto): Northern Cyprus
  - District: Lefkoşa District

Population (2006)
  - Total: 522
- Time zone: UTC+2 (EET)
  - Summer (DST): UTC+3 (EEST)

Mora (Greek: Μόρα; Turkish: Meriç) is a village in the Nicosia District of Cyprus.

== History ==
The village is de facto under the control of Northern Cyprus. Before the Turkish invasion of Cyprus in 1974 it was inhabited almost exclusively by Turkish Cypriots
