= Selladi tou Appi =

Selladi tou Appi: Σελλάδι του 'Αππη (Greek); Selçuklu (Turkish)
- Location in Cyprus
- Coordinates: 35°9′17″N 32°37′3″E
- Country: Cyprus
- District: Nicosia District

Population (2001)
  - Total: 0
- Time zone: UTC+2 (EET)
  - Summer (DST): UTC+3 (EEST)

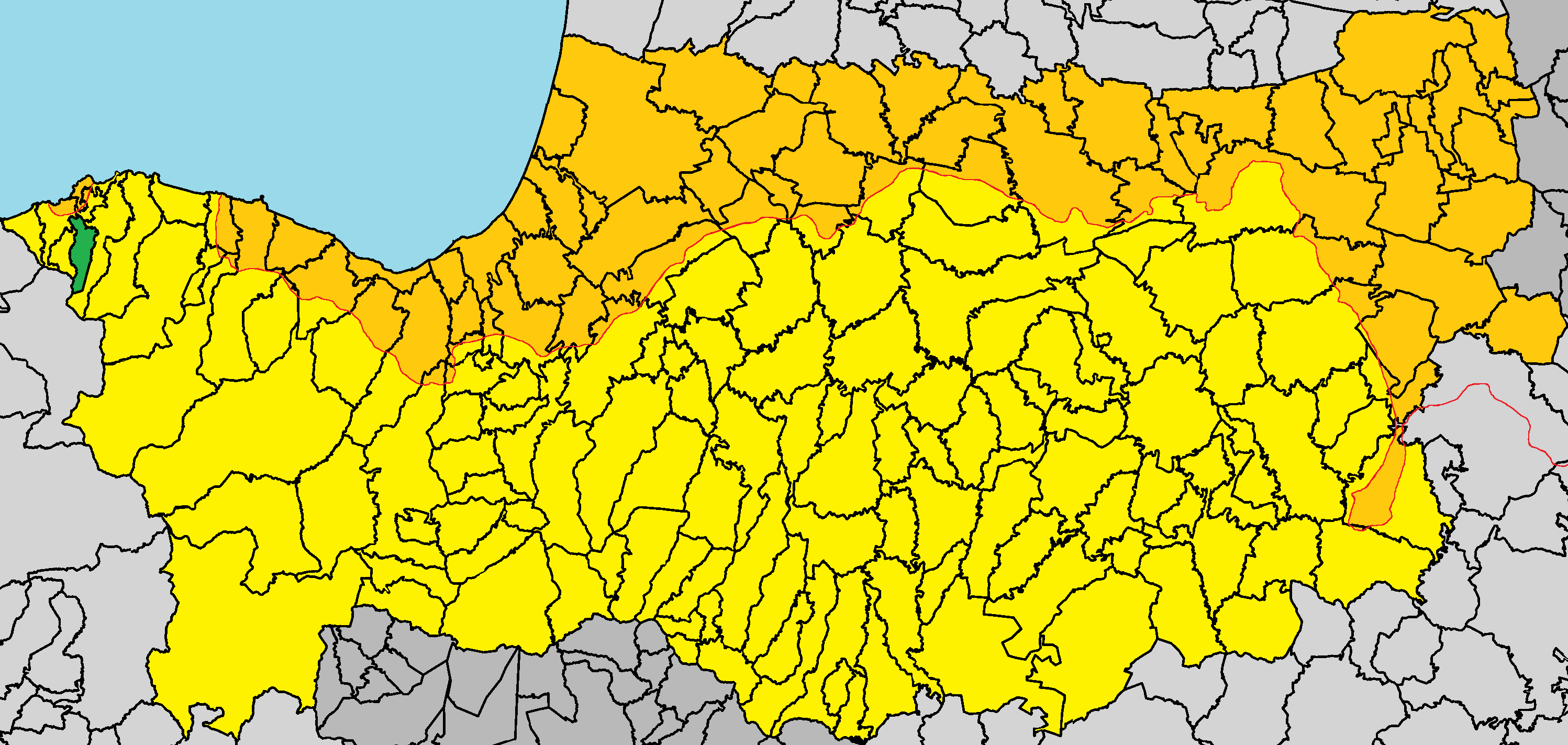
Selladi tou Appi in Nicosia District

Selladi tou Appi (Greek: Σελλάδι του 'Αππη; Turkish: Selçuklu) is a deserted village in the Nicosia District of Cyprus, near the Kokkina exclave but within the area controlled by the Cypriot government. Prior to 1974 the village was exclusively inhabited by Turkish Cypriots.
