= Oikos, Cyprus =

Oikos: Οίκος (Greek); İkos (Turkish)
- Village
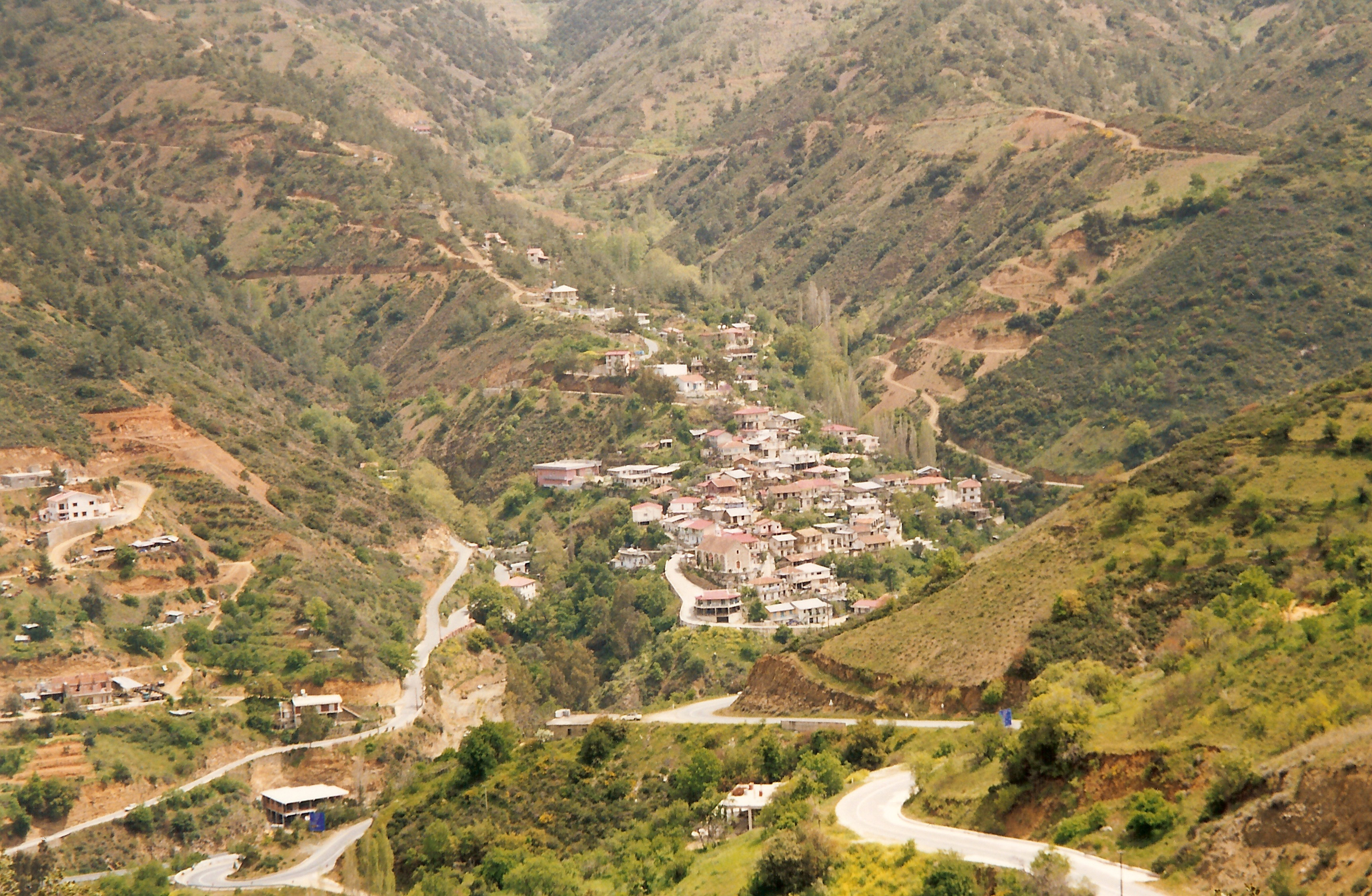
- 300

- Location in Cyprus
- Coordinates: 34°59′58″N 32°49′49″E
- Country: Cyprus
- District: Nicosia District

Population (2001)
  - Total: 186
- Time zone: UTC+2 (EET)
  - Summer (DST): UTC+3 (EEST)
- Postal code: 2867

Oikos (Greek: Οίκος; Turkish: İkos) is a village in the Nicosia District of Cyprus.
