= Petra tou Digeni =

Petra tou Digeni: Πέτρα του Διγενή (Greek); Yeniceköy (Turkish)
- Village
- Location in Cyprus
- Coordinates: 35°14′14″N 33°32′48″E
- Country (de jure): Cyprus
  - District: Nicosia District
- Country (de facto): Northern Cyprus
  - District: Lefkoşa District

Population (2011)
  - Total: 399
- Time zone: UTC+2 (EET)
  - Summer (DST): UTC+3 (EEST)

Petra tou Digeni (Greek: Πέτρα του Διγενή, romanized: Petra tou Digeni; Turkish: Yeniceköy) is a village in the Nicosia District of Cyprus, located 7 km east of Kythrea. The village is under de facto control of Northern Cyprus. Even before 1974, the town was almost exclusively inhabited by Turkish Cypriots.
