= Gerakies =

Gerakies: Γερακιές (Greek); Yeracez (Turkish)
- Village
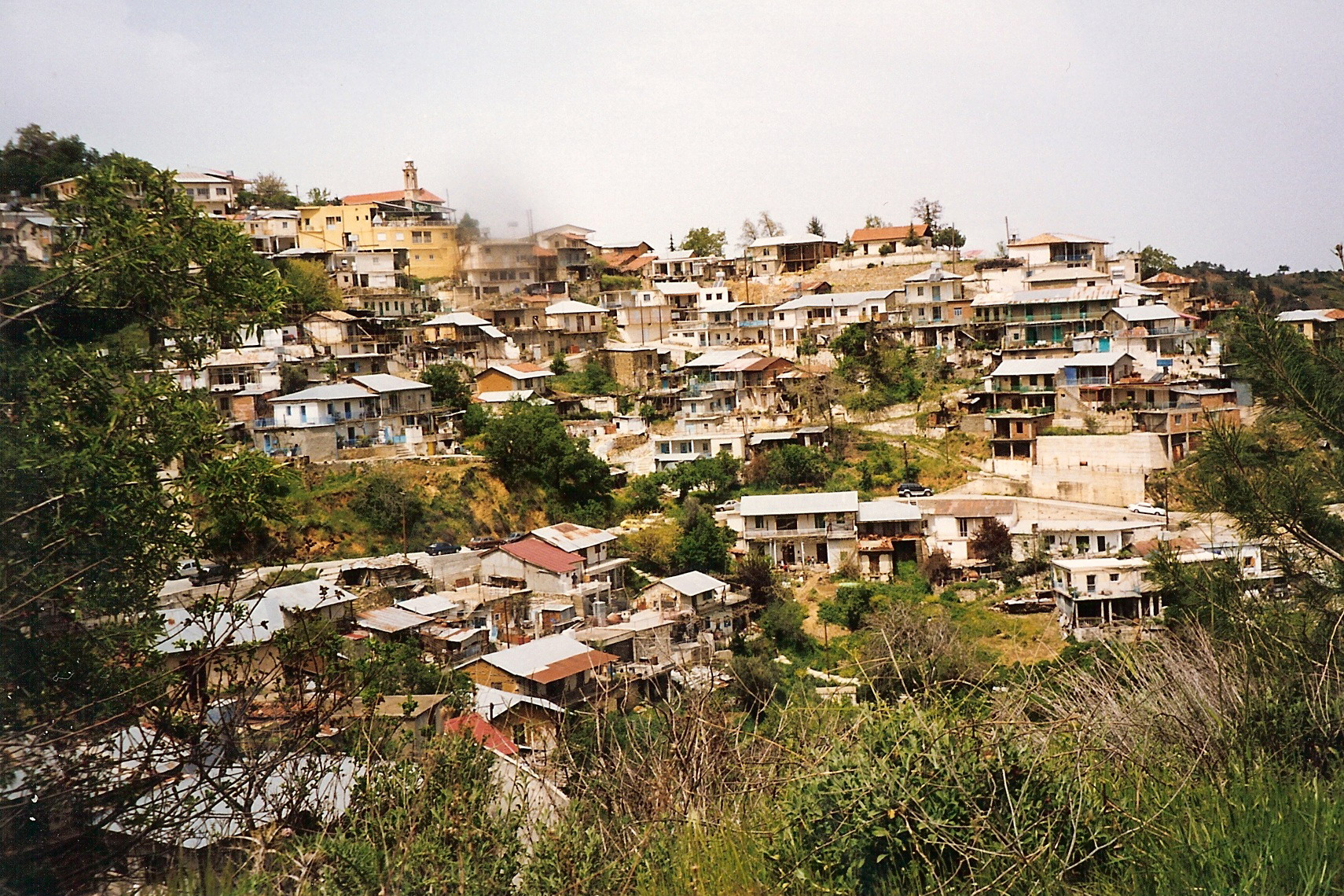

- Location in Cyprus
- Coordinates: 34°59′59″N 32°48′17″E
- Country: Cyprus
- District: Nicosia District

Population (2001)
  - Total: 123
- Time zone: UTC+2 (EET)
  - Summer (DST): UTC+3 (EEST)

Gerakies (Greek: Γερακιές; Turkish: Yeracez) is a village in the Nicosia District of Cyprus, located 4 km (2.5 mi) west of Moutoullas.
