= Agios Ioannis (Pyrgos) =

Agios Ioannis Selemani: Άγιος Ιωάννης Σελέμανη (Greek); Süleymaniye (Turkish)
- Village
- Location in Cyprus
- Coordinates: 35°8′0″N 32°42′0″E
- Country: Cyprus
- District: Nicosia District

Population
  - Total: 0
- Time zone: UTC+2 (EET)
  - Summer (DST): UTC+3 (EEST)

Agios Ioannis Selemani (Greek: Άγιος Ιωάννης Σελέμανη, Turkish: Süleymaniye) is a deserted village in the Nicosia District of Cyprus, located within the UN Buffer Zone close to Kato Pyrgos.

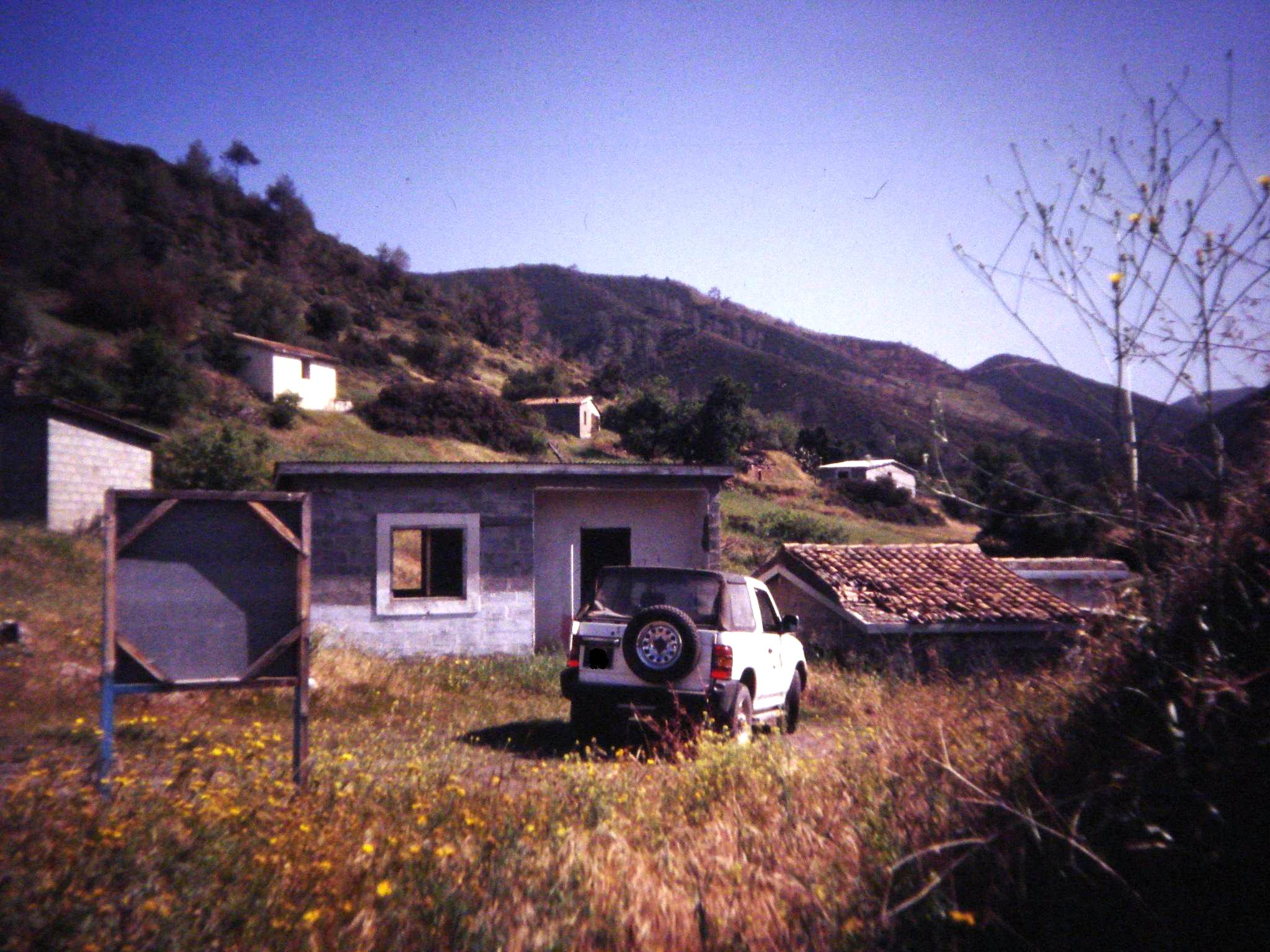
Selemani
