= Kourou Monastiri =

Kourou Monastiri: Κουρού Μοναστήρι (Greek); Çukurova (Turkish)
- Location within Cyprus
- Coordinates: 35°13′27″N 33°33′19″E
- Country (de jure): Cyprus
  - District: Nicosia District
- Country (de facto): Northern Cyprus
  - District: Lefkoşa District

Population (2011)
  - Total: 208

Kourou Monastiri (Greek: Κουρού Μοναστήρι; Turkish: Çukurova, previously Kuru Manastır) is a Turkish Cypriot village in the Nicosia District of Cyprus, located 8 kilometres (5.0 mi) east of Kythrea. Kourou Monastiri is under the de facto control of Northern Cyprus. As of 2011, it had a population of 208.
