= Alevga =

Alevga: Αλεύγα Βασίλειος (Greek); Alevkaya (Turkish)
- Location in Cyprus
- Coordinates: 35°9′20″N 32°36′20″E
- Country: Cyprus
- District: Nicosia District

Population (2001)
  - Total: 0
- Time zone: UTC+2 (EET)
  - Summer (DST): UTC+3 (EEST)

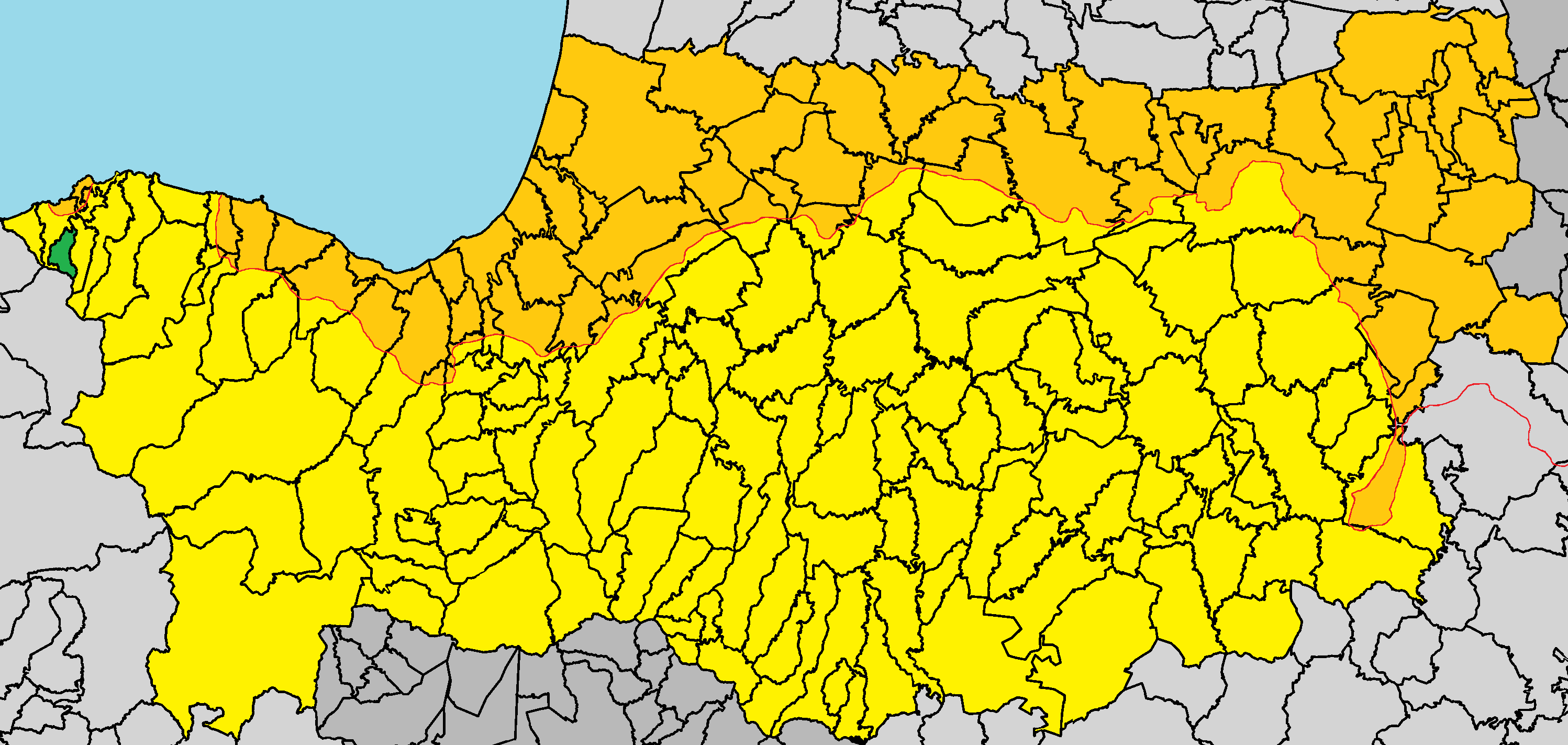
Geography of Alevga

Alevga (Greek: Αλεύγα; Turkish: Alevkaya) is an abandoned village in the Nicosia District of Cyprus, south of the Kokkina exclave but in an area still controlled by the Cypriot government. The village was almost exclusively inhabited by Turkish Cypriots prior to 1960.
