= Agios Georgios Lefkas =

Agios Georgios Soleas: Άγιος Γεώργιος Σολέας (Greek); Madenliköy (Turkish)
- Location in Cyprus
- Coordinates: 35°5′28″N 32°53′5″E
- Country: Cyprus
- District: Nicosia District

Population
  - Total: 0
- Time zone: UTC+2 (EET)
  - Summer (DST): UTC+3 (EEST)

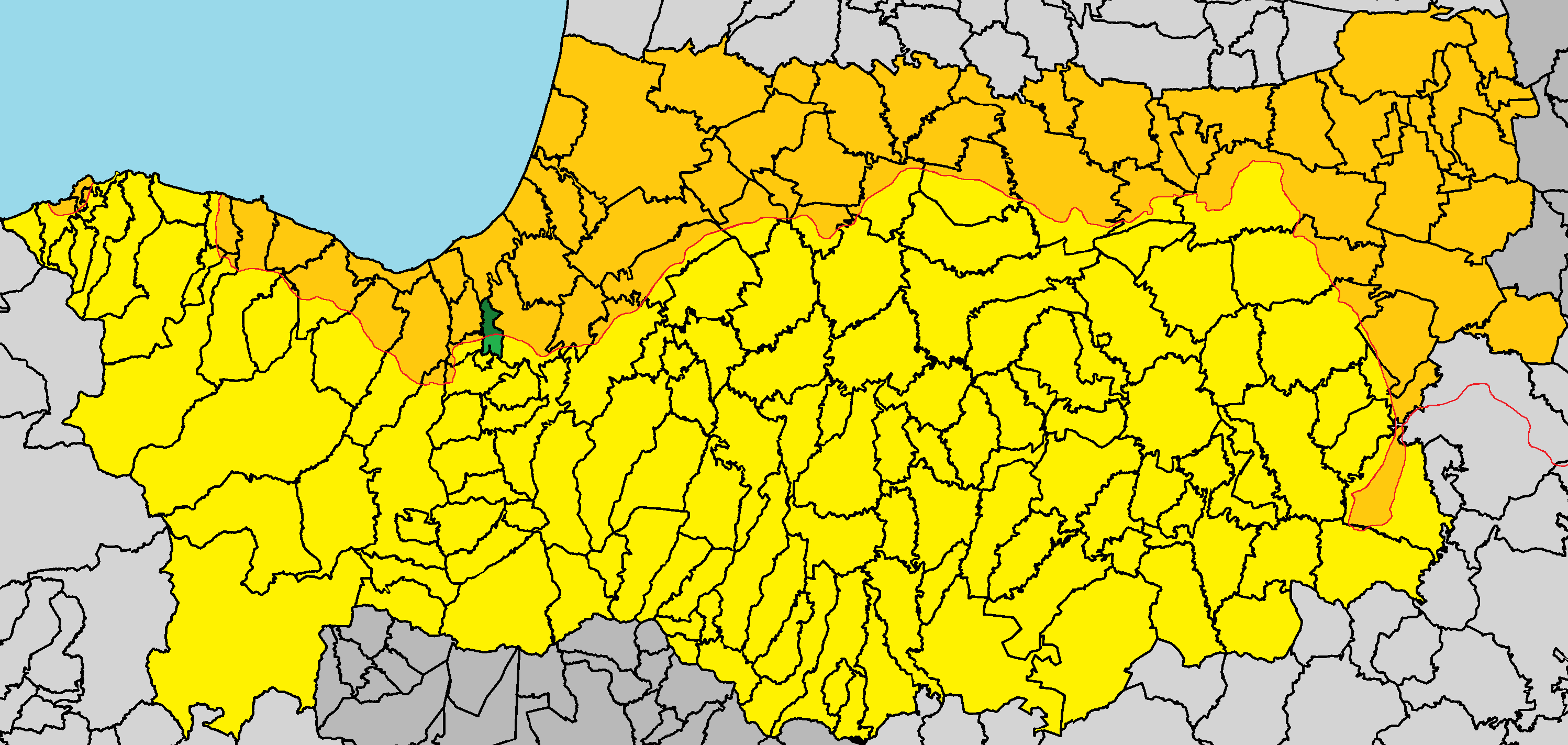
Agios Georgios Lefkas in Nicosia District (de jure).

Agios Georgios Soleas (Greek: Άγιος Γεώργιος Σολέας; Turkish: Madenliköy) is an abandoned village due to the Turkish invasion in Cyprus in 1974 in the Nicosia District of Cyprus, and it lies within the UN Buffer Zone. In 1960, the village had a population of 460; 312 identifying themselves as Greeks, 143 identifying themselves as Turks, and the other 5 not indicating an ethnicity or of mixed heritage. The population declined to zero by 1980 due to the placement of the Buffer Zone and the village was still abandoned at the time of the 2001 census.
