= Kalyvakia, Cyprus =

Kalyvakia: Καλυβάκια (Greek); Kalavaç (Turkish)
- Village
- Location in Cyprus
- Coordinates: 35°15′28″N 33°32′56″E
- Country (de jure): Cyprus
  - District: Nicosia District
- Country (de facto): Northern Cyprus
  - District: Lefkoşa District

Population (2006)
  - Total: 248
- Time zone: UTC+2 (EET)
  - Summer (DST): UTC+3 (EEST)

Kalyvakia (Greek: Καλυβάκια, Turkish: Kalavaç) is a village located in the Nicosia District of Cyprus, east of the town of Kythrea. The village is de facto under the control of Northern Cyprus.
