= Potami =

Potami: Ποτάμι (Greek); Potami (Turkish)
- Location in Cyprus
- Coordinates: 35°6′17″N 33°1′42″E
- Country: Cyprus
- District: Nicosia District

Population (2001)
  - Total: 558
- Time zone: UTC+2 (EET)
  - Summer (DST): UTC+3 (EEST)

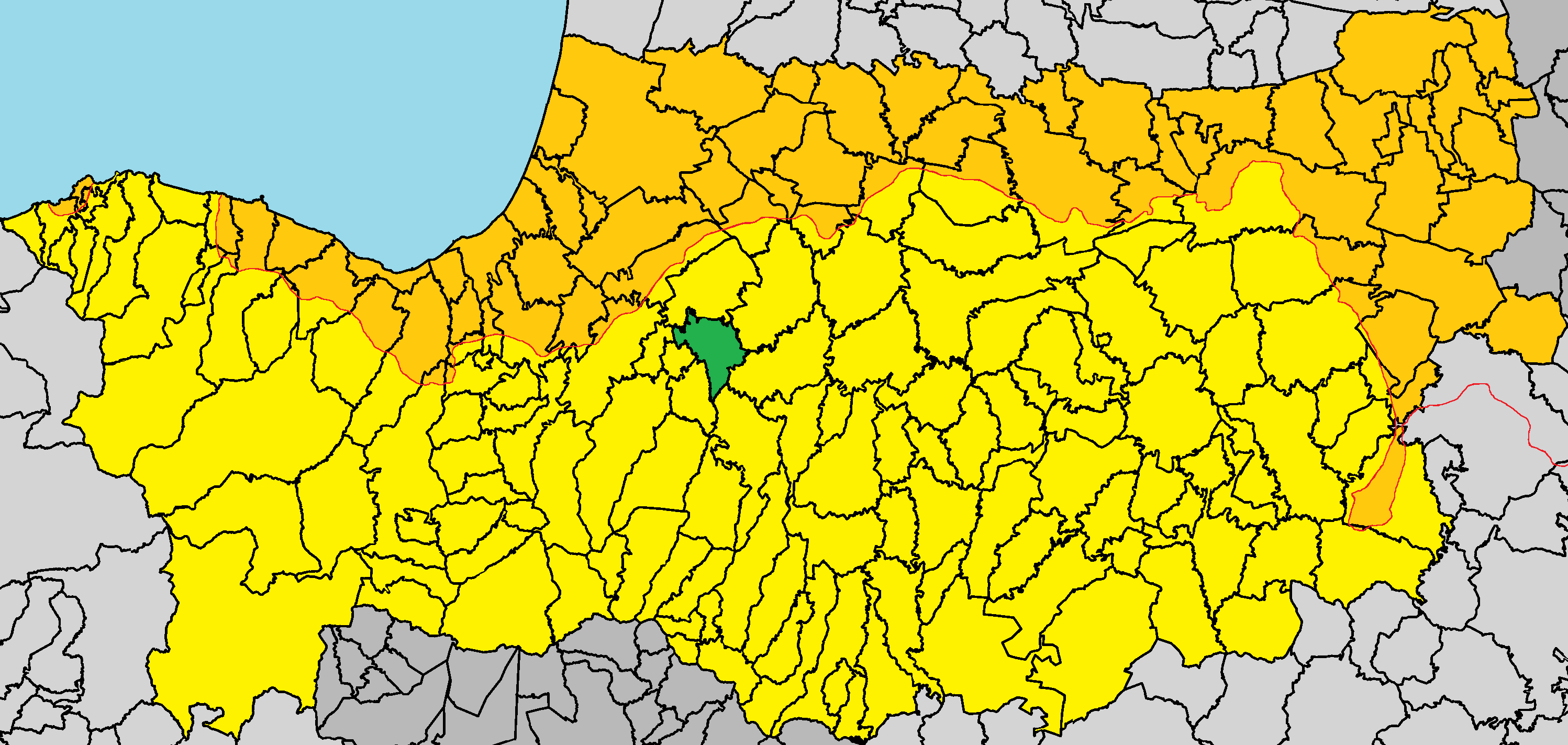
Potami in Nicosia District.

Potami(Greek: Ποτάμι; Turkish: Potami) is a small village near Nicosia with a population of approximately 558. According to local legend, the village was founded by a king who was buried there in a golden carriage. The village's name is thought to derive from its location between two rivers.
