= Agios Ioannis Malountas =

Agios Ioannis: Άγιος Ιωάννης (Greek); Aya Yoannis Maluntas (Turkish)
- Village
- Location in Cyprus
- Coordinates: 35°3′59″N 33°11′7″E
- Country: Cyprus
- District: Nicosia District

Population (2001)
  - Total: 445
- Time zone: UTC+2 (EET)
  - Summer (DST): UTC+3 (EEST)

Agios Ioannis Malountas (Greek: Άγιος Ιωάννης Μαλούντας; Turkish: Aya Yoannis Maluntas) is a village in the Nicosia District of Cyprus, located 5 km north of Malounta.
