= Pachyammos =

Pachyammos: Παχύαμμος (Greek); Paşiyammu (Turkish)
- Village
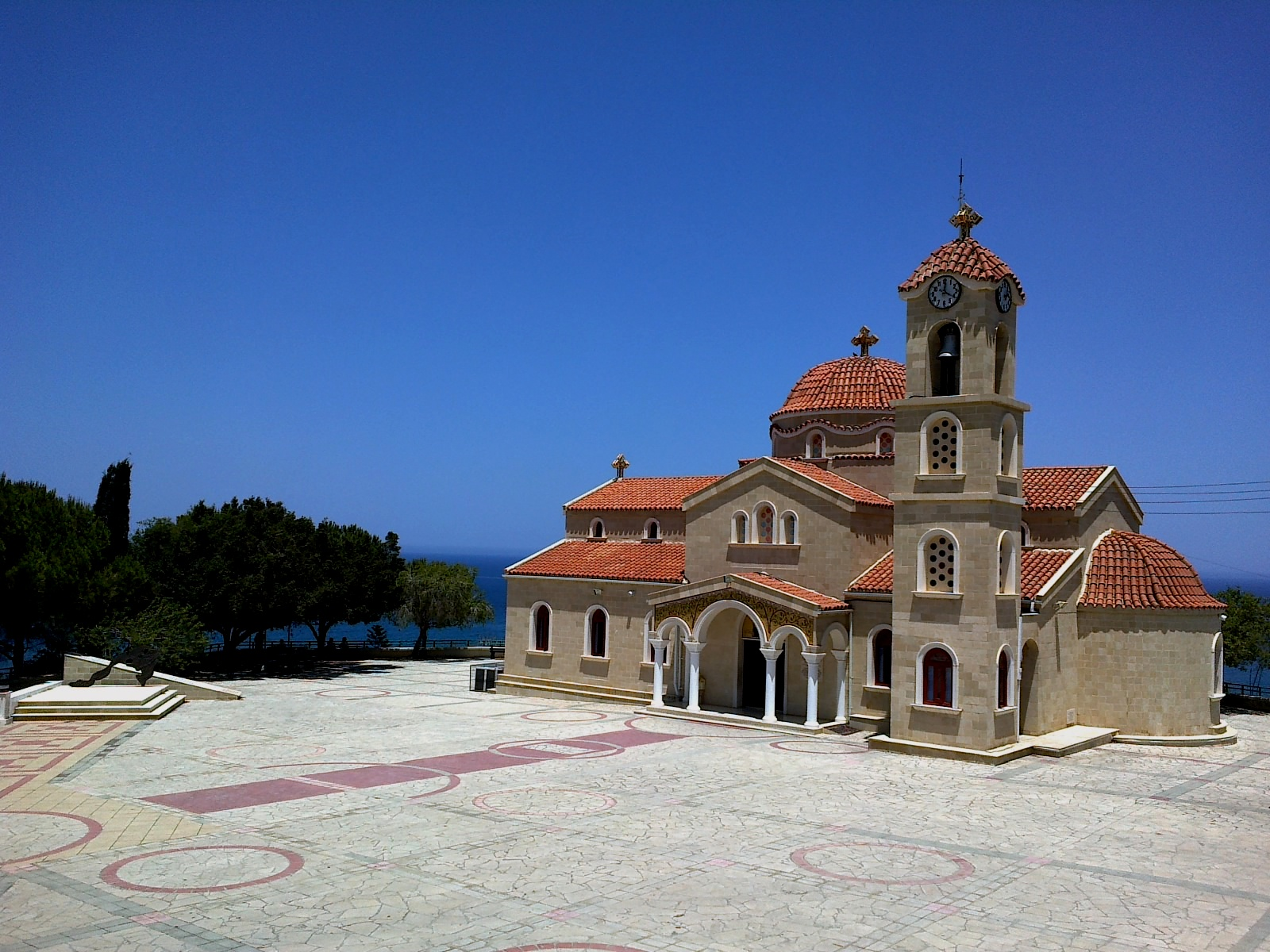
- Agios Raphael in Pacchyammos

- Location in Cyprus
- Coordinates: 35°10′18″N 32°35′0″E
- Country: Cyprus
- District: Nicosia District

Population (2001)
  - Total: 97
- Time zone: UTC+2 (EET)
  - Summer (DST): UTC+3 (EEST)

Pachyammos (Greek: Παχύαμμος, pronounced [pa̠ˈçʲi.a̠mːo̞s]; Turkish: Paşiyammu) is a village in the Nicosia District of Cyprus, located in Tillyria area just west of the Kokkina exclave.
