= Kampi =

Village in Nicosia District, Cyprus

Kampi: Καμπί (Greek); Kampi (Turkish)
- Village
- Location in Cyprus
- Coordinates: 34°54′28″N 33°7′46″E
- Country: (Cyprus)
- District: Nicosia District

Population (2001)
  - Total: 104
- Time zone: UTC+2 (EET)
  - Summer (DST): UTC+3 (EEST)

Kampi (Greek: Καμπί; Turkish: Kampi) is a small village located in the Nicosia District of Cyprus, east of the town of Palaichori Oreinis.
