= Nicosia District =

District of Cyprus

Coordinates: 35°04′N 33°12′E

Nicosia District Επαρχία Λευκωσίας (Greek) Lefkoşa Kazası (Turkish)
- District
- Location of the district in Cyprus
- Country: Cyprus
- Capital: Nicosia

Area
  - District: 2,710.0 km^{2} (1,046.3 sq mi)
- (Note: Including de facto Northern Cyprus and UN buffer zone.)

Population (2021)
  - District: 350,824
  - Rank: 1st
  - Density: 129.46/km^{2} (335.29/sq mi)
  - Urban: 244,200
  - Rural: ~82,780
- Time zone: UTC+2 (EET)
  - Summer (DST): UTC+3 (EEST)
- Post code: 1000-2999
- Area code: +357 22

The Nicosia District, (Note: Greek: Επαρχία Λευκωσίας, romanized: Eparkhía Lefkosías [/éparxía lefkosías/]; Turkish: Lefkoşa Kazası) or simply Nicosia (Note: /ˌnɪkəˈsiːə/) (also Lefkosia (Note: Greek: Λευκωσία, romanized: Lefkosía; pronounced [lɛfko'siɐ]) and Lefkoşa (Note: Turkish: pronounced [lefkoʃa])), is one of the six districts of Cyprus. Its main town is the island country's capital city, Nicosia. The de facto TRNC-controlled northern part of the district is the Lefkoşa District of the Turkish Republic of Northern Cyprus.

TRNC-controlled areas of the Larnaca District of the Republic of Cyprus are administered as part of Nicosia District, while western parts of the Nicosia District under de facto TRNC control are administered as part of the new Güzelyurt and Lefke Districts.

== History ==
Under Lusignan rule, at least the latter part and then during the Venetian period, the Kingdom of Cyprus was divided into eleven provinces called in French contrées and in Italian contrade. The area around Nicosia was the province of Vicomté (literally the domain of a Viscount). It covered the eastern half of the present District of Nicosia, what would later become the Nahiehs of Dagh and Deyirmenlik (orange on map). The western half of the present district formed the province of Pendaïa (Pendagia). One significant difference in the borders was that Vicomté extended closer to the sea, encroaching upon the Pentadaktylos foothills in the present Kyrenia District.

Nicosia District 1878 - 1881 Nahiehs of Lefka and Morphou in green. Nahiehs of Dagh and Kythrea/Deyirmenlik in orange

Under Ottoman Turkish rule, Nicosia was one of the six cazas into which the island was divided. The Caza of Nicosia, also known as the Caza of Deyirmenlik, was divided into two nahiehs - Dagh (Orini) and Deyirmenlik (Kythrea). The caza was headed by a Kaimakan. When the British took control of Cyprus in 1878, these administrative units were retained. A British officer styled a Commissioner (later District Officer) was appointed for the caza of Nicosia, while the Turkish Kaimakan was initially retained with certain of his functions.

The Nahiehs of Lefka and Morphou were previously in the Caza of Kyrenia. But by 1881, the Nahiehs of the Caza of Nicosia were:

- Lefka
- Morphou
- Dagh
- Deyirmenlik

The town of Nicosia, previously separate, came under the Nahieh of Deyirmenlik (Greek: Kythrea) in the British period.

== Population ==
The population of Nicosia Caza or District in 1881 was as follows:

Nahieh	Population 1881
Morphou	11306
Kythrea	24043
Dagh	10446
Lefka	10505
TOTAL	56300

At the most recent census the population of the district was as follows:

Area	Population 2011
Nicosia District (Cyprus government sector)	326980
Nicosia District (Turkish occupied sector)	94824
Morphou District (Turkish occupied sector)	30037
TOTAL	451841

The total figure above includes 1,599 for the communities of Melouseia, Tremetousia and Arsos in Larnaca District and Afania in Famagusta District.

Thus, the population of Nicosia District has increased eight-fold since 1881.

== Settlements ==
According to Statistical Codes of Municipalities, Communities and Quarters of Cyprus per the Statistical Service of Cyprus (2015), Nicosia District has 12 municipalities and 162 communities. Municipalities are written with bold.

- Agia
- Agia Eirini
- Agia Marina
- Agia Marina (Skylloura)
- Agia Varvara
- Agioi Iliofotoi
- Agioi Trimithias
- Agios Dometios
- Agios Epifanios Oreinis
- Agios Epifanios Soleas
- Agios Georgios
- Agios Georgios Lefkas
- Agios Ioannis (Selemani)
- Agios Ioannis Malountas
- Agios Nikolaos Lefkas
- Agios Sozomenos
- Agios Theodoros, Nicosia
- Agios Theodoros Tilliria
- Agios Vasileios
- Aglandjia
- Agrokipia
- Akaki
- Alampra
- Alevga
- Alithinou
- Alona
- Ammadies
- Ampelikou
- Analiontas
- Anageia
- Angolemi
- Anthoupolis
- Apliki
- Arediou
- Argaki
- Askas
- Astromeritis
- Avlona
- Beykeuy
- Dali
- Deneia
- Dyo Potamoi
- Elia
- Engomi
- Epicho
- Episkopeio
- Ergates
- Evrychou
- Exometochi
- Farmakas
- Fikardou
- Flasou
- Fterikoudi
- Fyllia
- Galata
- Galini
- Gerakies
- Geri
- Gerolakkos
- Gönyeli
- Gourri
- Kakopetria
- Kaliana
- Kalo Chorio Kapouti
- Kalo Chorio Oreinis
- Kalo Chorio Soleas
- Kalopanagiotis
- Kalyvakia
- Kampi
- Kampia
- Kampos
- Kanli
- Kannavia
- Kapedes
- Karavostasi
- Kataliontas
- Kato Deftera
- Katokopia
- Kato Koutrafas
- Kato Moni
- Kato Pyrgos
- Kato Zodeia
- Katydata
- Kazivera
- Klirou
- Kokkina
- Kokkinotrimithia
- Korakou
- Kotsiatis
- Kourou Monastiri
- Kyra
- Kythrea
- Lagoudera
- Lakatamia
- Latsia
- Lazanias
- Lefka
- Linou
- Livadia
- Louroujina
- Loutros
- Lympia
- Lythrodontas
- Malounta
- Mammari
- Mandres
- Mansoura
- Margi
- Margo
- Masari
- Mathiatis
- Meniko
- Mia Milia
- Mylikouri
- Mitsero
- Mora
- Morphou
- Mosfileri
- Moutoullas
- Neo Chorio
- Nicosia
- Nikitari
- Nikitas
- Nisou
- Oikos
- Orounta
- Ortaköy
- Pachyammos
- Palaichori Morphou
- Palaichori Oreinis
- Palaikythro
- Paliometocho
- Pano Deftera
- Pano Koutrafas
- Pano Pyrgos
- Pano Zodeia
- Pedoulas
- Pentageia
- Pera
- Pera Chorio
- Peristerona
- Peristeronari
- Petra
- Petra tou Digeni
- Pigenia
- Platanistasa
- Politiko
- Polystypos
- Potami
- Potamia
- Prastio
- Psimolofou
- Pyrogi
- Saranti
- Selladi tou Appi
- Sia
- Sinaoros
- Skouriotissa
- Skylloura
- Spilia
- Strovolos
- Syrianochori
- Temvria
- Trachoni
- Trachonas
- Tsakistra
- Tseri
- Tymbou
- Variseia
- Voni
- Vroisha
- Vyzakia
- Xerovounos
- Xyliatos
