= Agrokipia =

Agrokipia: Αγροκηπιά (Greek); Agrokipya (Turkish)
- Village
- Location in Cyprus
- Coordinates: 35°2′40″N 33°9′18″E
- Country: Cyprus
- District: Nicosia District

Population (2001)
  - Total: 431
- Time zone: UTC+2 (EET)
  - Summer (DST): UTC+3 (EEST)

Agrokipia (Greek: Αγροκηπιά; Turkish: Agrokipya) is a village in the Nicosia District of Cyprus, located 3 km west of Klirou.
