= Sinaoros =

Sinaoros: Σινάoρος (Greek); Sinaoros (Turkish)
- Village
- Location in Cyprus
- Coordinates: 35°0′30″N 32°53′57″E
- Country: Cyprus
- District: Nicosia District

Population (2001)
  - Total: 233
- Time zone: UTC+2 (EET)
  - Summer (DST): UTC+3 (EEST)

Sinaoros (Greek: Σινάoρος; Turkish: Sinaoros), also known as Sina Oros, is a village in the Nicosia District of Cyprus. It is situated approximately 3 km north of the town of Kakopetria.
