= Saranti =

Saranti: Σαράντη (Greek); Saranti (Turkish)
- Village
- Location in Cyprus
- Coordinates: 34°58′7″N 33°0′7″E
- Country: Cyprus
- District: Nicosia District

Population (2001)
  - Total: 57
- Time zone: UTC+2 (EET)
  - Summer (DST): UTC+3 (EEST)

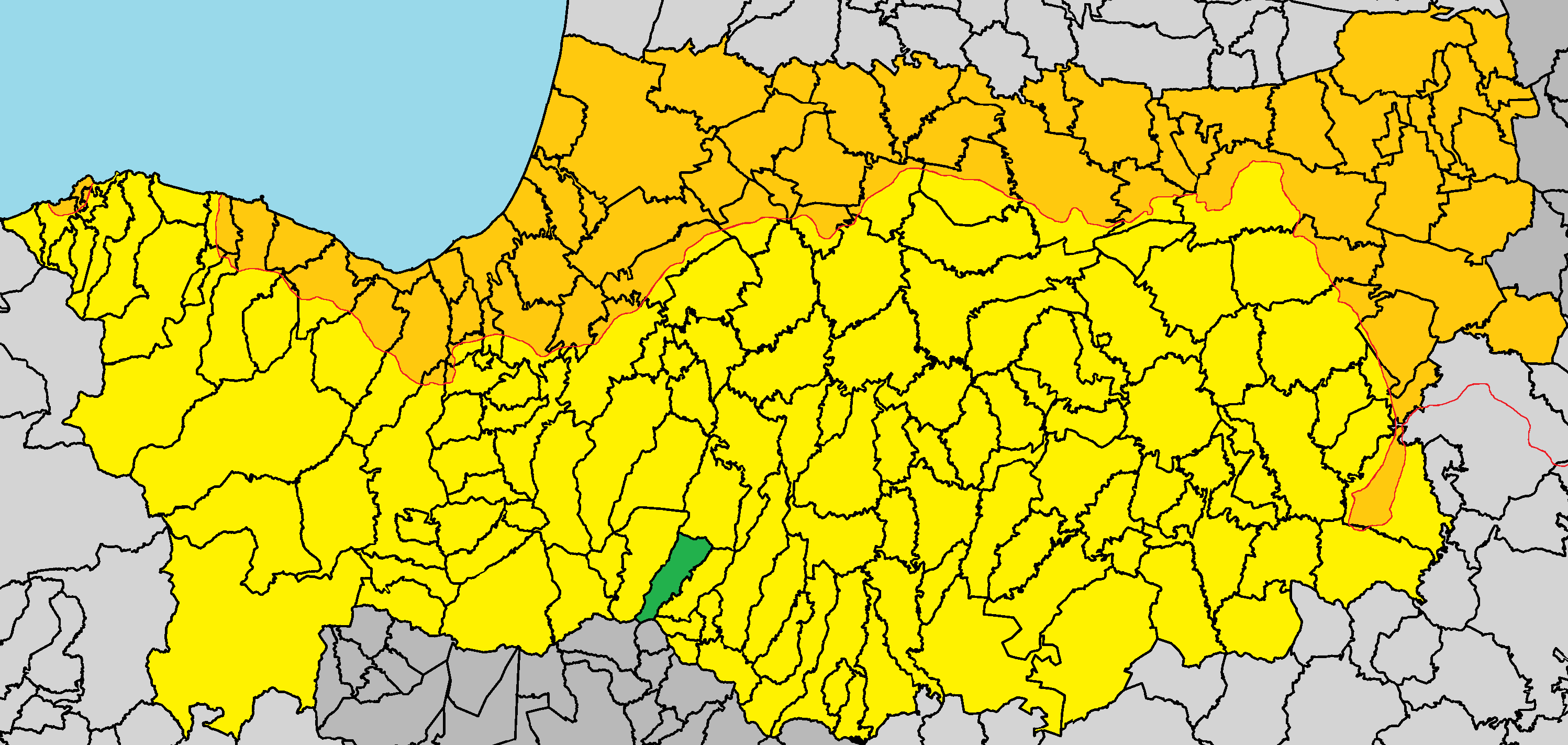

Saranti (Greek: Σαράντη; Turkish: Saranti) is a small village in the Nicosia District of Cyprus, located near Lagoudera.
