= Agios Nikolaos Lefkas =

Agios Nikolaos Lefkas: Άγιος Νικόλαος Λεύκας (Greek); Yamaç (Turkish)
- Village
- Location in Cyprus
- Coordinates: 35°5′28″N 32°53′5″E
- Country: Cyprus
- District: Nicosia District

Population (2001)
  - Total: 0
- Time zone: UTC+2 (EET)
  - Summer (DST): UTC+3 (EEST)

Agios Nikolaos Lefkas (Greek: Άγιος Νικόλαος Λεύκας; Turkish: Yamaç) is an abandoned village in the Nicosia District of Cyprus, and it lies within the UN Buffer Zone. In 1946, the village had a population of 132. This declined to 67 by the time of the 1960 census and the village was abandoned altogether with the creation of the UN Buffer Zone.
