= Episkopeio =

Episkopeio: Επισκοπειό (Greek); Episkopio (Turkish)
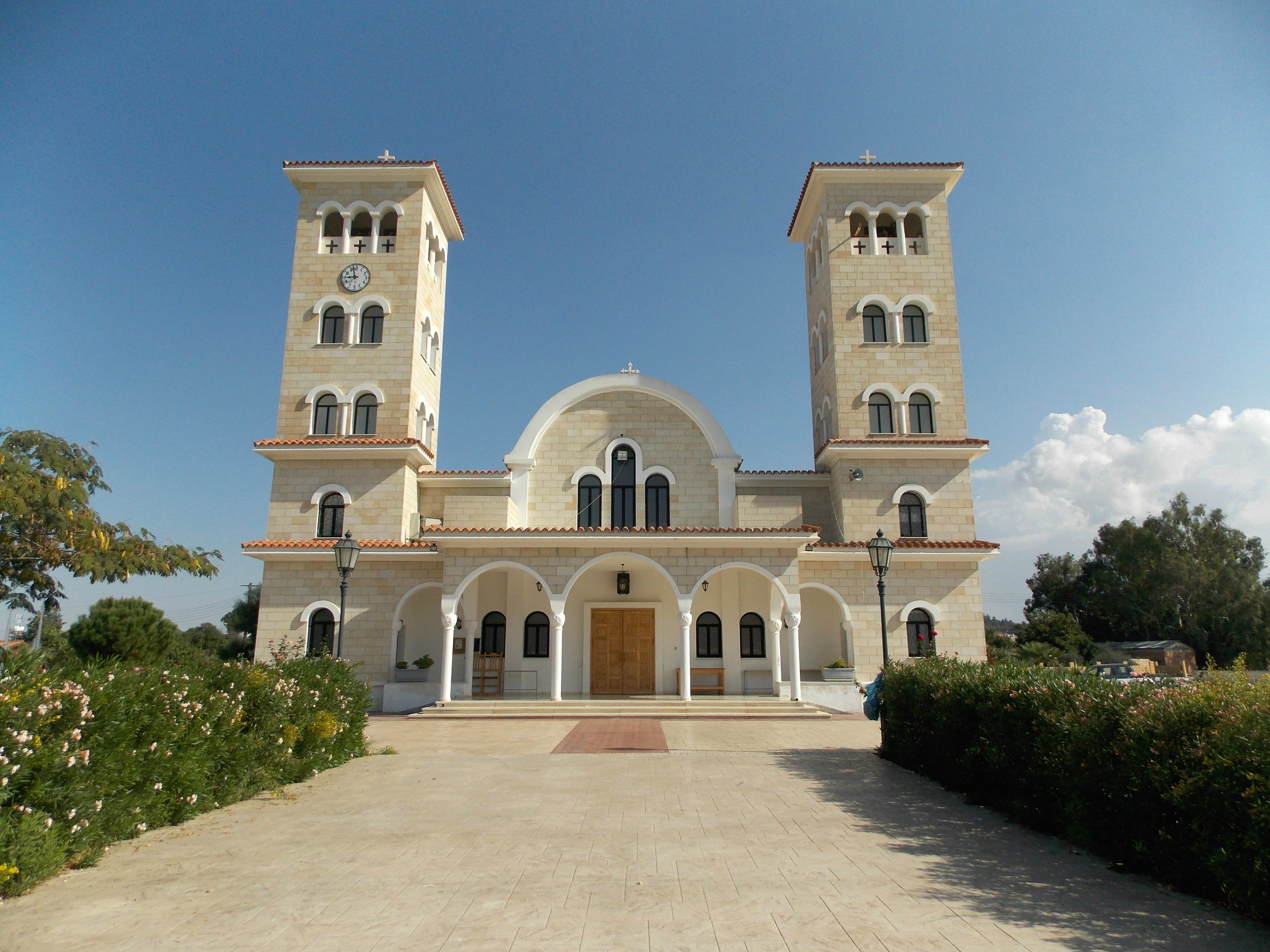

- Location in Cyprus
- Coordinates: 35°2′30″N 33°14′43″E
- Country: Cyprus
- District: Nicosia District

Population (2001)
  - Total: 511
- Time zone: UTC+2 (EET)
  - Summer (DST): UTC+3 (EEST)

Episkopeio (Greek: Επισκοπειό; Turkish: Episkopio) is a village located in the Nicosia District of Cyprus.

The church of the Apostle Andrew and all Russian saints is located near the village. The church is constructed in traditional Russian orthodox style. The construction of the church began in October 2015 and was finished on 7 July 2016 as it was performed in short terms. Its 5 domes, including the central one that weights 7 tons, were made in Saint Petersburg and were installed by Russian specialists. The church is the first and only Russian church in Cyprus that has gilded domes.

== Sources ==
- The church of the Apostle Andrew and all Russian saints (in Russian)
- Official website of the church of the Apostle Andrew and all Russian saints (in Russian)
