= Polystypos =

Polystypos: Πολύστυπος (Greek); Bolistibo (Turkish); Απόστολος Ανδρέας ο Πολύστυπος
- Village
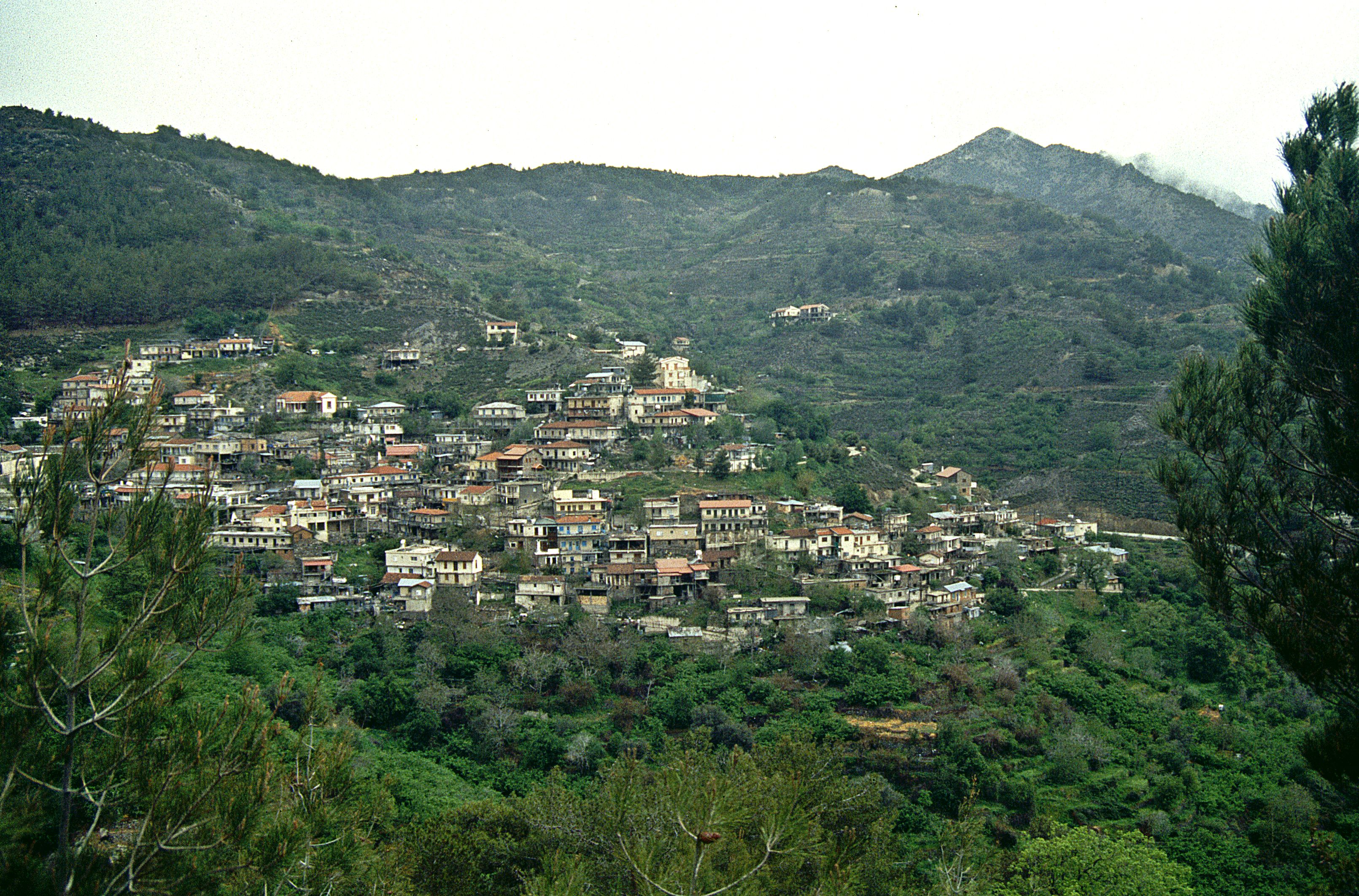

- Location in Cyprus
- Coordinates: 34°56′22″N 33°1′10″E
- Country: Cyprus
- District: Nicosia District

Population (2001)
  - Total: 173
- Time zone: UTC+2 (EET)
  - Summer (DST): UTC+3 (EEST)
- Website: http://www.polystipos.org/

Polystypos (Greek: Πολύστυπος; Turkish: Bolistibo), sometimes also spelled Polystipos, is a village in the Nicosia District of Cyprus, located near Chandria. The origin of the name comes from "Poly" meaning "very" and “stypes” meaning "vines". Therefore, Polystypos means a location with many vineyards.

== History ==
Polystypos's name means "a location with many vines", referring to the many vineyards that it used to be home to. The number of vineyards in the area decreased significantly in the 18th century after a tax was imposed on wine production.
