= Margi =

Margi: Μαργι (Greek); Küçükköy (Turkish)
- Location in Cyprus
- Coordinates: 35°1′26″N 33°19′33″E
- Country: Cyprus
- District: Nicosia District

Population (2001)
  - Total: 100
- Time zone: UTC+2 (EET)
  - Summer (DST): UTC+3 (EEST)

Margi (Greek: Μαργί; Turkish: Küçükköy) is a village located in the Nicosia District of Cyprus. Before 1960, the village population was made up almost exclusively of Turkish Cypriots.
