= Fterikoudi =

Fterikoudi: Φτερικούδι (Greek); Fterikudi (Turkish)
- Village
- Location in Cyprus
- Coordinates: 34°56′32″N 33°4′9″E
- Country: Cyprus
- District: Nicosia District

Population (2001)
  - Total: 142
- Time zone: UTC+2 (EET)
  - Summer (DST): UTC+3 (EEST)

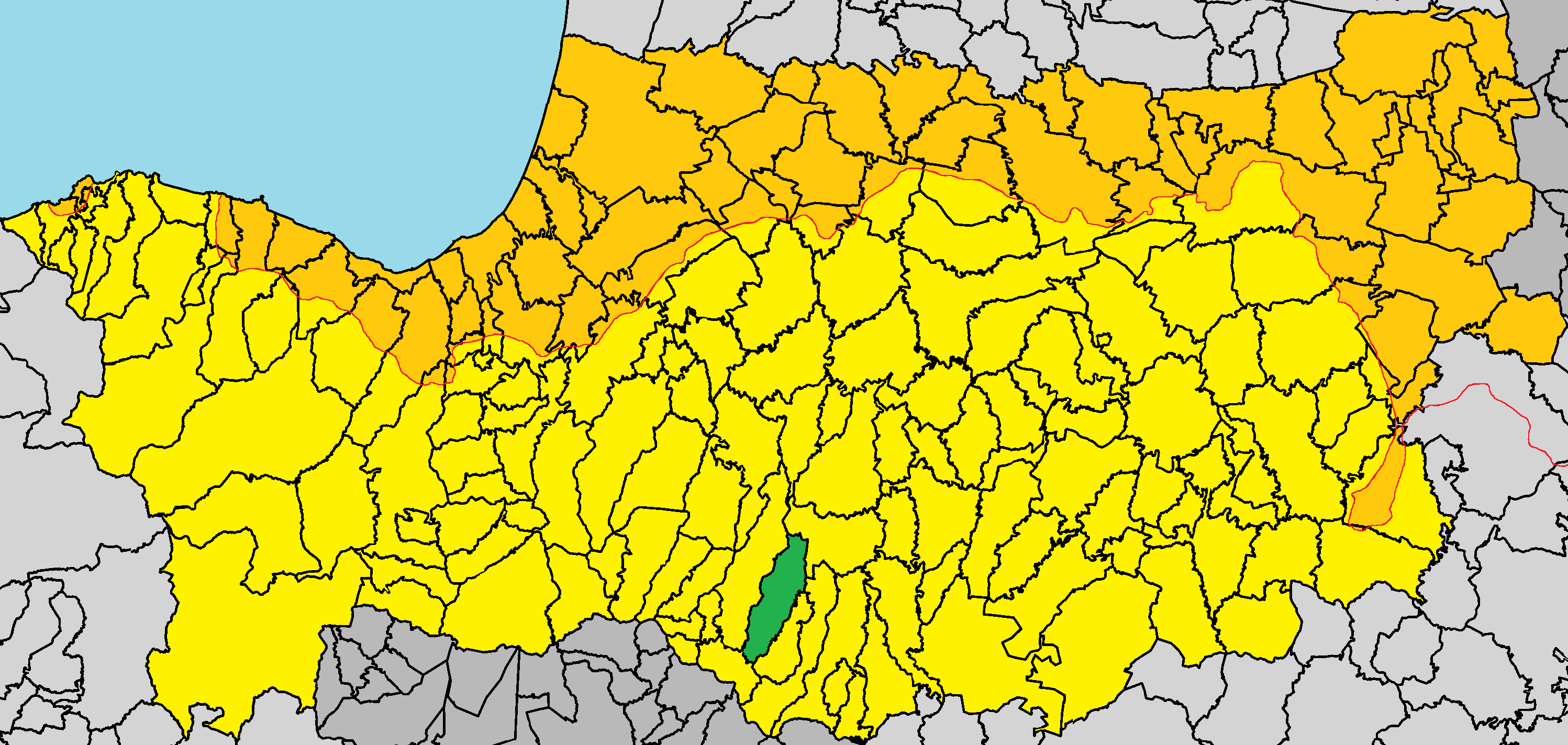
Fterikoudi in Nicosia District.

Fterikoudi (Greek: Φτερικούδι; Turkish: Fterikudi) is a village in the Nicosia District of Cyprus, located 4 km north of Palaichori Morphou. Fterikoudi is built on the green slope of Troodos, approximately 48 km southwest of the capital city. It is one of the highest villages of Cyprus, at an altitude of 1050 metres.
