= Variseia =

Variseia: Βαρίσεια (Greek); Şirinköy (Turkish)
- Village
- Location in Cyprus
- Coordinates: 35°7′50″N 32°44′57″E
- Country: Cyprus
- District: Nicosia District
- Time zone: UTC+2 (EET)
  - Summer (DST): UTC+3 (EEST)

Variseia or Varisha (Greek: Βαρίσεια; Turkish: Şirinköy) is an abandoned village inside the Buffer Zone, near Gailini, Cyprus.
