= Vroisha =

Frodisia: Βροΐσια (Greek); Yağmuralan (Turkish)
- Village
- Location in Cyprus
- Coordinates: 35°3′54″N 32°39′29″E
- Country: Cyprus
- District: Nicosia District

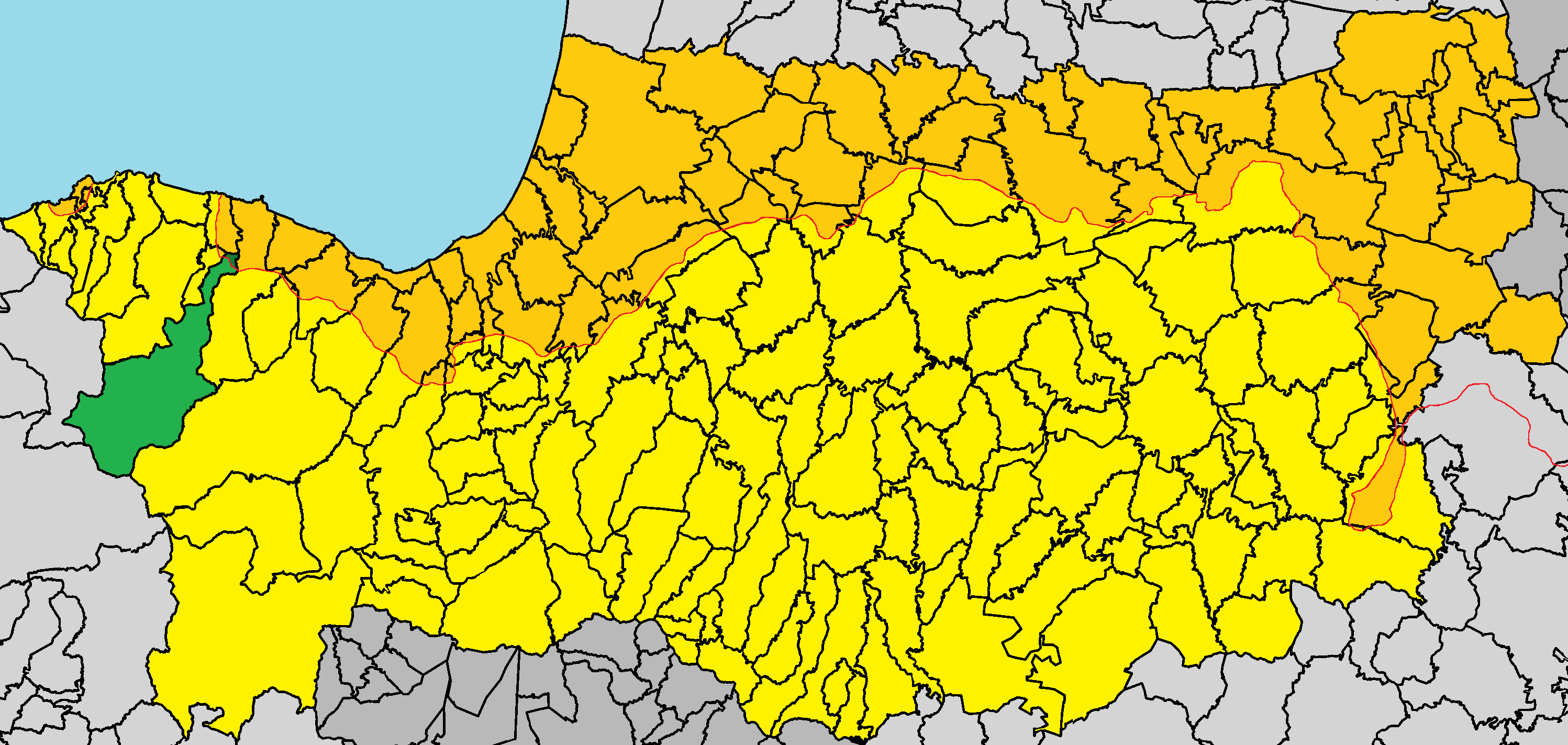

Vroisha or Frodisia or Vroisia (Greek: Βροΐσια Greek pronunciation: [ˈvro.iʃa] or Φρόδισια; Turkish: Vroişa or Yağmuralan - This alternative name was adopted by the Turkish Cypriots in 1959, literally meaning: "place that receives rain").

Although in 1891 there were some Greek Cypriots living in Vroisha, from 1901 to 1960 the village was almost solely inhabited by Turkish Cypriots. During the period of British Colonial Rule the population of the village increased steadily from 48 in 1891 to 235 in 1960. Just before the evacuation in 1964, the population of the village was 254.

Vroisha is a deserted village in the Tylliria Region, Nicosia District of Cyprus, in the Paphos Forest. Until 15 March 1964, it was inhabited exclusively by Turkish Cypriots.

This Turkish Cypriot village was deserted between 15 and 18 March 1964 and all the displaced inhabitants of Vroisha sought refuge in the Turkish Cypriot enclaves of Limnitis/Yeşilırmak and Amadies/Günebakan and those who sought refuge in Selemani/Süleymaniye village were displaced again in August 1964, when the area came under heavy military attack by General Grivas and his Greek Cypriot militias. Many refugees remained in those Turkish Cypriot enclaves until 1975, when they were once again resettled in the villages of Potamos tou Kambos/Yedidalga, Karavostasi and Xeros/Gemikonağı. However, as a result of losing their village, many of the former inhabitants of Vroisha immigrated to other countries such as the United Kingdom and Australia, in search of a new life for themselves and their families.

The village has been known as Vroişa (Vroisha in English) for hundreds of years by both Turkish and Greek Cypriots but sometime after 1974, the Cyprus Government changed its official name to "Frodisia".
