= Arediou =

Arediou: Αρεδιού (Greek); Arediu (Turkish)
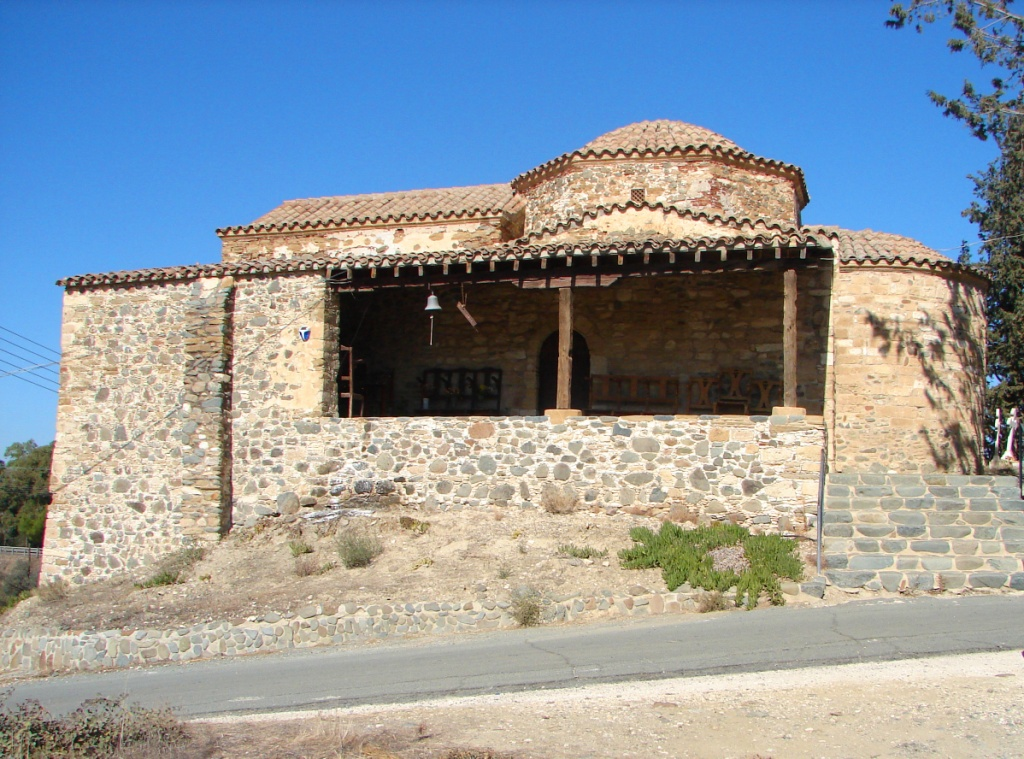
- Panagia Odigitria

- Location in Cyprus
- Coordinates: 35°2′51″N 33°11′41″E
- Country: Cyprus
- District: Nicosia District

Population (2001)
  - Total: 1,084
- Time zone: UTC+2 (EET)
  - Summer (DST): UTC+3 (EEST)

Arediou (Greek: Αρεδιού; Turkish: Arediu) is a village located in the Nicosia District of Cyprus. The "Arediou intercity Bus Station" connects the village with the suburbs of Nicosia.

== History ==
Although the area has been inhabited since ancient times, the present Arediou founded by residents of nearby old settlements and agricultural land tenants during Frankish-rule (1200–1490).

It is estimated that about three-quarters of the population of nearby old settlements were lost and whole villages were burned when the Black Death struck in the decades of 1340 and 1370, thus changing the demographic character of the area.

The village's name is associated with the name of Arras-Du-Joan's. Arras-Du was a middleman for the nobles and peasants, and seasonal workers agent. The name was established for the reason that the location was called the manor of Arras Du. In Turkish, the name of the village was pronounced Arradiou. Finally, the name came to be Arediou.

With the Ottoman conquest of the island in 1570, began the process of Islamization, "designed to reduce the Christian population". In 1591, a few Christian families from Kouloupades hamlets converted to Islam (Turkish Cypriots), in exchange for the privilege of the Koutis river waters and Lord Arras estates. They settled in Arediou.

All Turkish Cypriot residents are reported to have abandoned the village during the outbreak of hostilities between the Greek and Turkish residents in 1964.

== Bibliography ==
- De Mas Latrie, Louis: Histoire de l'île de Chypre
- Boustronios, Georgios: Chronicle Cyprus
- Menardos, Simos: Topographical and Folkloric Studies
