= Ammadies =

Ammadies: Αμμαδιές (Greek); Günebakan (Turkish)
- Location within Cyprus
- Coordinates: 35°10′05″N 32°42′42″E
- Country (de jure): Cyprus
  - District: Nicosia District
- Country (de facto): Northern Cyprus
  - District: Lefke District
- Time zone: UTC+2 (EET)
  - Summer (DST): UTC+3 (EEST)

Ammadies (Greek: Αμμαδιές; Turkish: Günebakan) is an abandoned village in the Tilliria region of north-western Cyprus. De facto, Ammadies is under the control of Northern Cyprus.
