= Kannavia =

Kannavia: Καννάβια (Greek); Kannavya (Turkish)
- Village
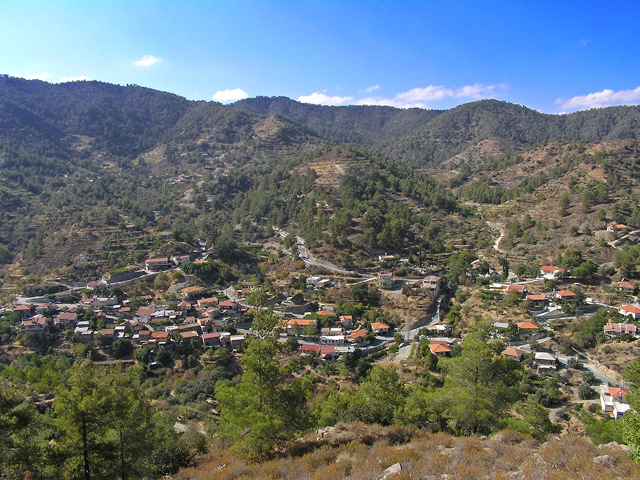

- Location in Cyprus
- Coordinates: 34°58′56″N 32°58′34″E
- Country: Cyprus
- District: Nicosia District

Population (2001)
  - Total: 186
- Time zone: UTC+2 (EET)
  - Summer (DST): UTC+3 (EEST)

Kannavia (Greek: Καννάβια; Turkish: Kannavya) is a village in the Nicosia District of Cyprus, located near Spilia. The small hamlet Kapoura is part of the Kannavia municipality.
