= Syrianochori =

Syrianochori: Συριανοχώρι (Greek); Yayla (Turkish)
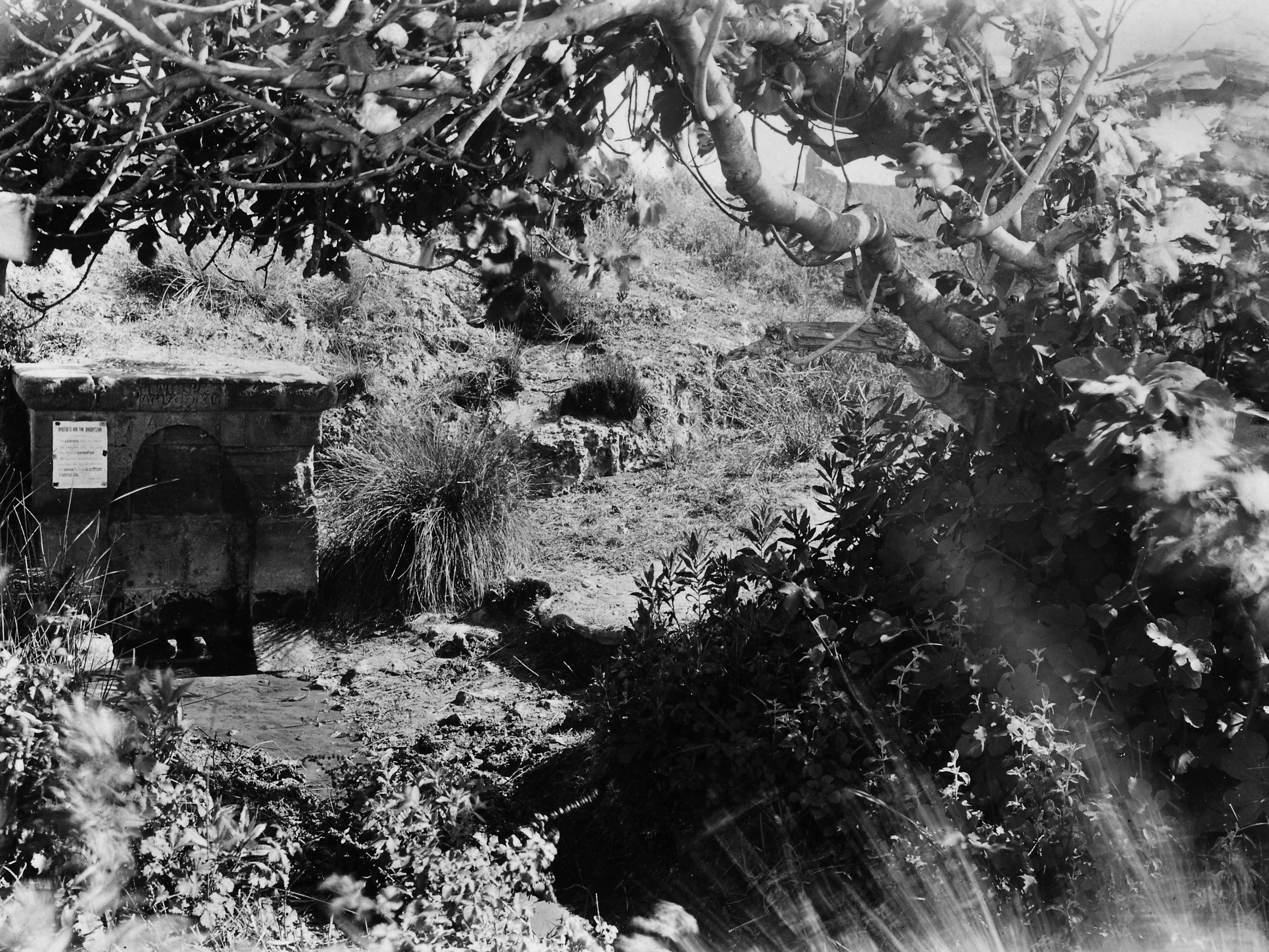
- The Swedish Cyprus expedition 1927–1931

- Location within Cyprus
- Coordinates: 35°13′27″N 32°56′23″E
- Country (de jure): Cyprus
  - District: Nicosia District
- Country (de facto): Northern Cyprus
  - District: Güzelyurt District

Population (2011)
  - Total: 850
- Time zone: UTC+2 (EET)
  - Summer (DST): UTC+3 (EEST)

Syrianochori (Greek: Συριανοχώρι; Turkish: Yayla) is a village located in the Nicosia District of Cyprus. On a De facto basis, it is under the control of Northern Cyprus.
