= Apliki =

Apliki: Απλίκι (Greek); Aplıç (Turkish)
- Village
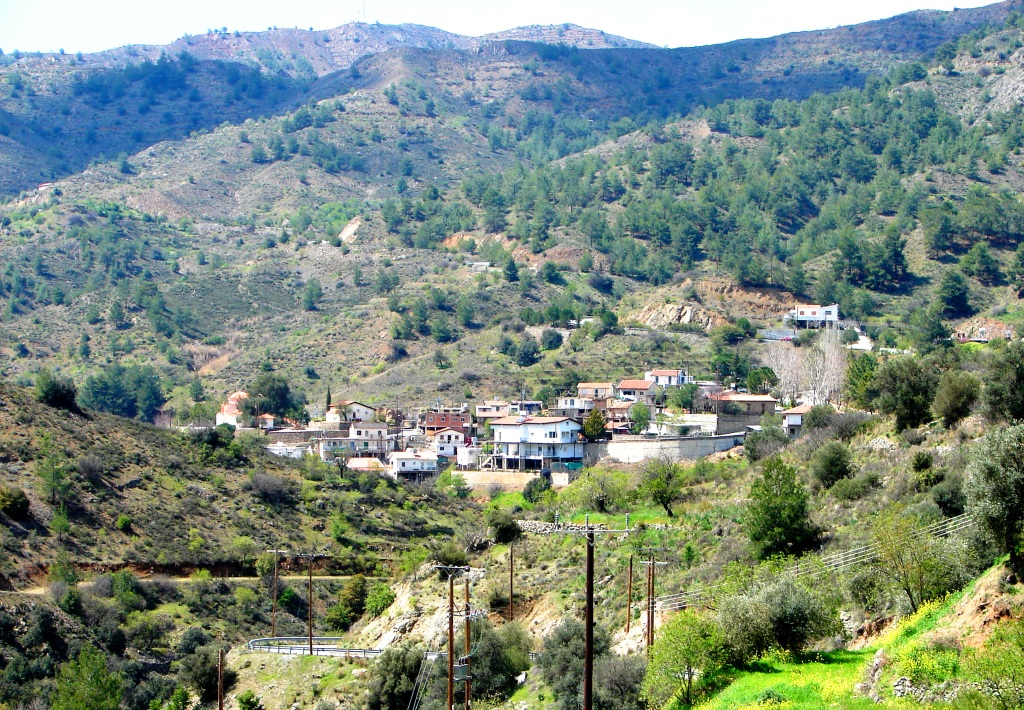

- Location in Cyprus
- Coordinates: 34°55′51″N 33°7′1″E
- Country: Cyprus
- District: Nicosia District

Population (2001)
  - Total: 80
- Time zone: UTC+2 (EET)
  - Summer (DST): UTC+3 (EEST)

Apliki (Greek: Απλίκι; Turkish: Aplıç) is a small village in the Nicosia District of Cyprus, located 2.5 km North-East of Palaichori Oreinis and is at an altitude of 720 meters above sea level.

Apliki is located west of the small “Maroullenas” river, which flows into the river of Akaki. It is exactly in the south and east of the settlement, where first the stream of Apliki flows into the river of “Maroullenas” and then the stream of Kampi flows into the same river.

Apliki was a copper mining region dating from the late 14th Century BC. Excavations show it to have been a smelter site, built on rocky terraces. Four houses were excavated, with rich findings, including an ivory cylinder, a cylinder seal of steatite and a gold earring.

== Literature ==
- Joan du Plat Taylor 1952. A Late Bronze Age Settlement at Apliki, Cyprus. Ant Journal 32, 133–167.
- A. Bernard Knapp 2003, The Archaeology of Community on Bronze Age Cyprus: Politiko Phorades in Context. American Journal of Archaeology 107, 574.
- J. D. Muhly 1989, The Organisation of the Copper Industry in Late Bronze Age Cyprus. In E. Peltenburg (Ed.), Early Society in Cyprus. Edinburgh: Edinburgh University Press, 307.
- J. D. Muhly 1991, The Development of Copper Metallurgy in Late Bronze Age Cyprus. In: N. H. Gale (Ed.), Bronze Age Trade in the Mediterranean. Jonsered, Paul Åströms Förlag, 183.
- Rodney Tylecote 1981, From Pot Bellows to Tuyeres. Levant 13, 111, 116.
