= Dyo Potamoi =

Dyo Potamoi: Δυο Ποταμοί (Greek); İkidere (Turkish)
- Location within Cyprus
- Coordinates: 35°14′47″N 33°05′27″E
- Country (de jure): Cyprus
  - District: Nicosia District
- Country (de facto): Northern Cyprus
  - District: Güzelyurt District
- Time zone: UTC+2 (EET)
  - Summer (DST): UTC+3 (EEST)

Dyo Potamoi (Greek: Δυο Ποταμοί or Δύο Ποταμοί, literally 'Two Rivers'; Turkish: İkidere or İki Dere) is an abandoned hamlet in Cyprus, east of Kapouti. De facto, it is under the control of Northern Cyprus.

Dyo Potamoi has been abandoned since 1964. In 1960, it had 40 inhabitants, all of them Turkish Cypriots.
