= Pano Koutrafas =

Pano Koutrafas: Πάνω Κουτραφάς (Greek); Yukarı Kurtboğan (Turkish)
- Village
- Location in Cyprus
- Coordinates: 35°5′34″N 32°59′57″E
- Country: Cyprus
- District: Nicosia District

Population (2001)
  - Total: 0
- Time zone: UTC+2 (EET)
  - Summer (DST): UTC+3 (EEST)

Pano Koutrafas (Greek: Πάνω Κουτραφάς, Turkish: Yukarı Kurtboğan) is a small village in the Nicosia District of Cyprus, 3 km south of Kato Koutrafas. Before 1974, the village was inhabited almost exclusively by Turkish Cypriots. Today the village is largely uninhabited.
