= Flasou =

Flasou: Φλάσου (Greek); Flasu (Turkish)
- Village
- Location in Cyprus
- Coordinates: 35°3′39″N 32°53′14″E
- Country: Cyprus
- District: Nicosia District

Population (2001)
  - Total: 261
- Time zone: UTC+2 (EET)
  - Summer (DST): UTC+3 (EEST)

Flasou (Greek: Φλάσου, Turkish: Flasu) is a village in the Nicosia District of Cyprus. The village is located 2 km north of Evrychou.
