= Livadia, Nicosia =

Livadia Λιβάδια
- Village
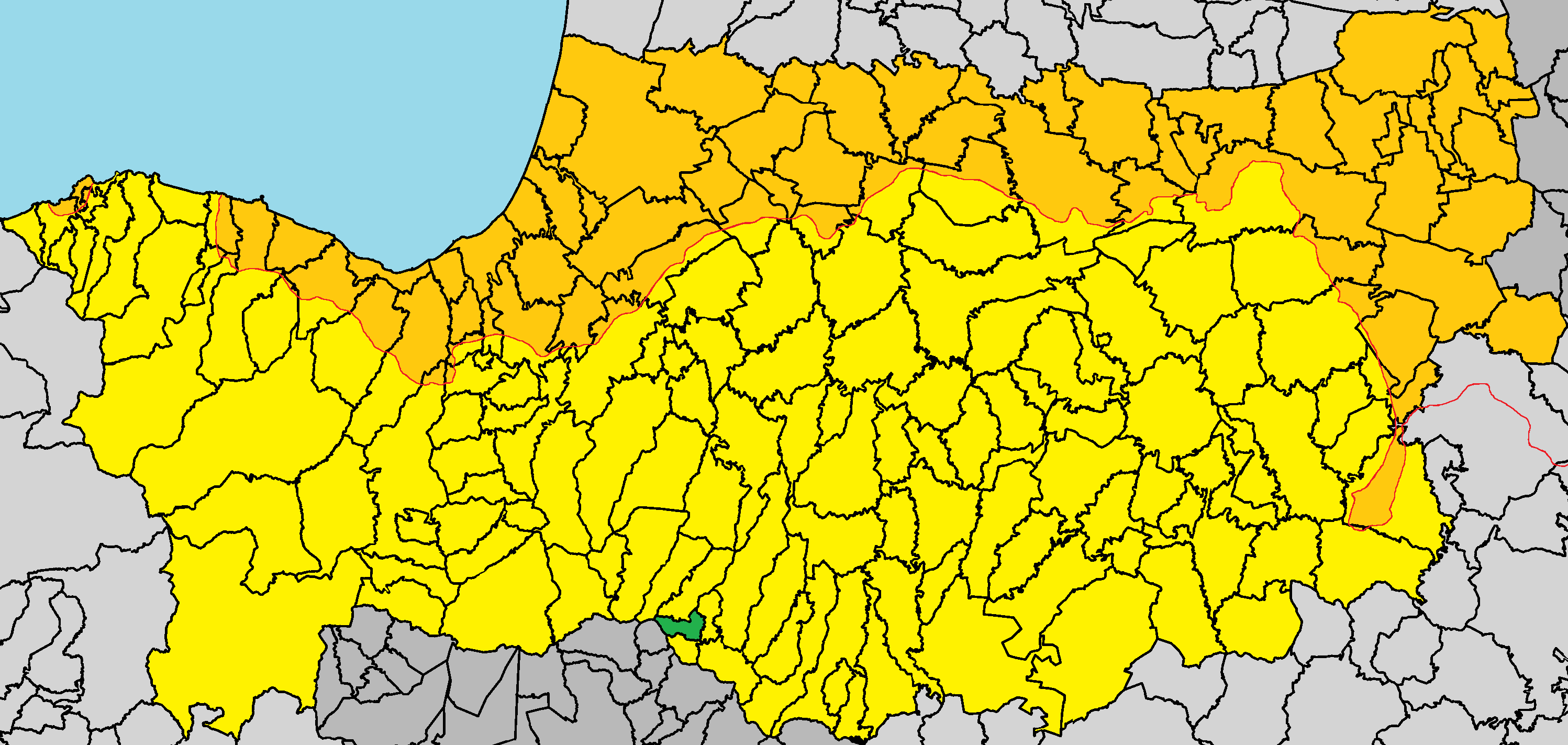
- Livadia, Nicosia in Nicosia District.

- Location in Cyprus
- Coordinates: 34°56′45″N 33°1′18″E
- Country: Cyprus
- District: Nicosia District

Population (2001)
  - Total: 20
- Time zone: UTC+2 (EET)
  - Summer (DST): UTC+3 (EEST)

Livadia (Greek: Λιβάδια) is a small village in the Nicosia District of Cyprus, near Chandria.
