= Agia Eirini, Nicosia =

Agia Eirini: Άγια Ειρήνη (Greek); Aya İrini (Turkish)
- Village
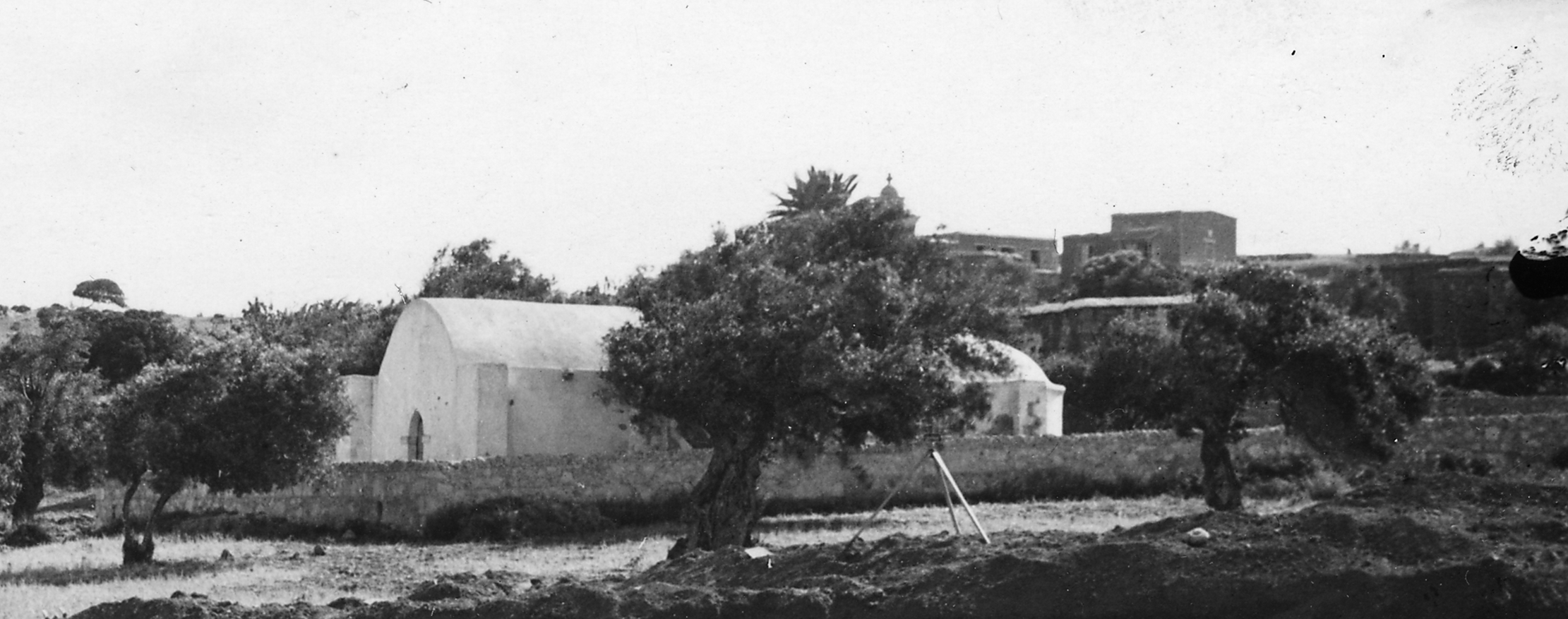
- Village between 1927 and 1931

- Location in Cyprus
- Coordinates: 34°59′0″N 32°58′0″E
- Country: Cyprus
- District: Nicosia District
- Time zone: UTC+2 (EET)
  - Summer (DST): UTC+3 (EEST)

Agia Eirini or Agia Irini (Greek: Άγια Ειρήνη; Turkish: Aya İrini) is a village located in Nicosia District, approximately 5 km east of Kakopetria in the Troodos mountains.

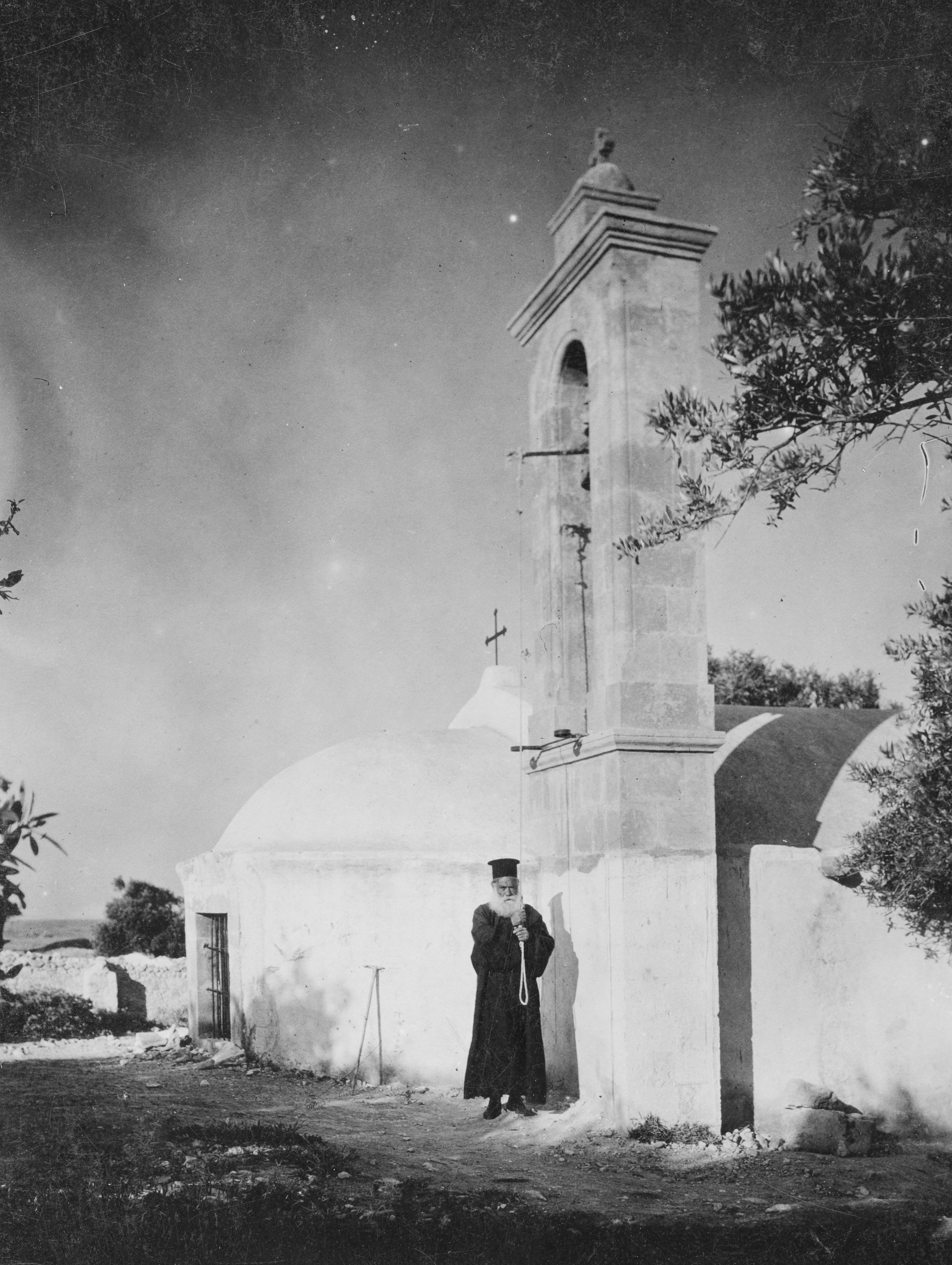
Church in Ayia Erini between 1927 and 1931
