= Tseri =

Tseri: Tσέρι (Greek); Çeri (Turkish)
- Municipality
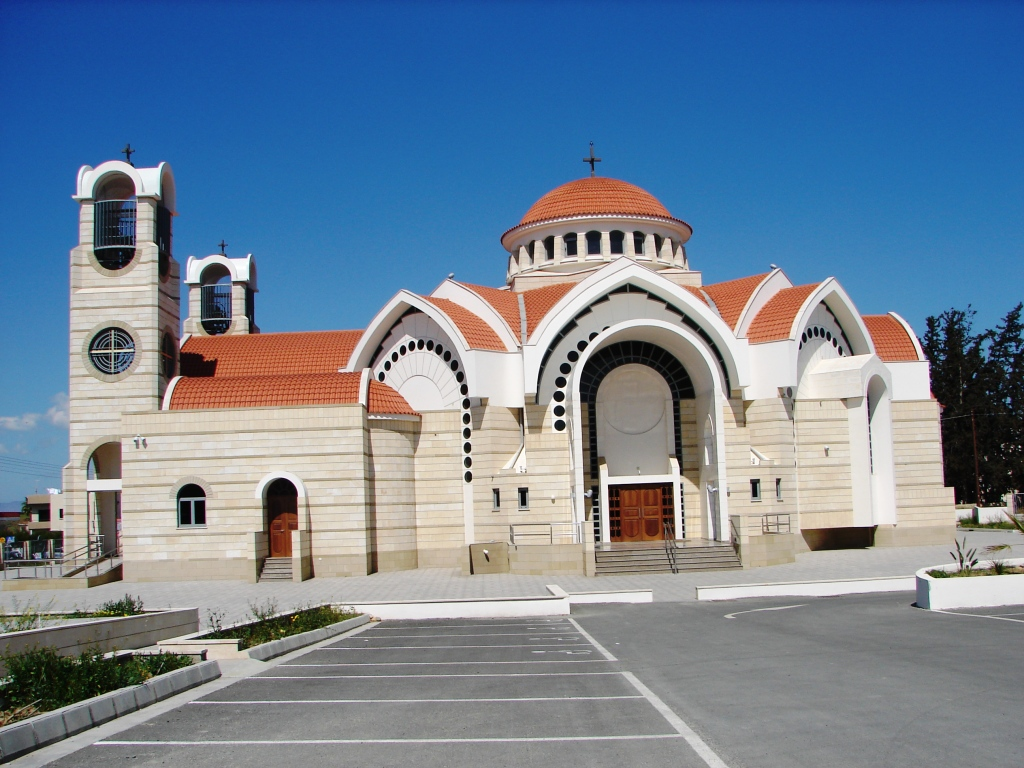
- Village church in March 2011

- Location in Cyprus
- Coordinates: 35.066871°N 33.316661°E
- Country: Cyprus
- District: Nicosia District

Government
  - Mayor: Stavros Michael
- Elevation: 909 ft (277 m)

Population (2021)
  - Total: 8,304
- Time zone: UTC+2 (EET)
  - Summer (DST): UTC+3 (EEST)
- Postal code: 2480
- Website: www.tseri.org.cy

Tseri (Greek: Tσέρι; Turkish: Çeri), also known as Seri or Xeri, is a south suburb of Nicosia, Cyprus.

== Overview ==
The region had a population of about of 300 people before 1974. In 2011, it had a population of 7,035. Its inhabitants are known as "Tseriotis" or "Tserkotis" for males and "Tseriotissa" or "Tserkotissa" for females. Following a referendum in 2011, Tseri became a municipality.

== Notable residents ==
- Theodosis Pierides (1908–1968), poet
