= Mylikouri =

Mylikouri: Μηλικούρι (Greek); Milikur (Turkish)
- Village
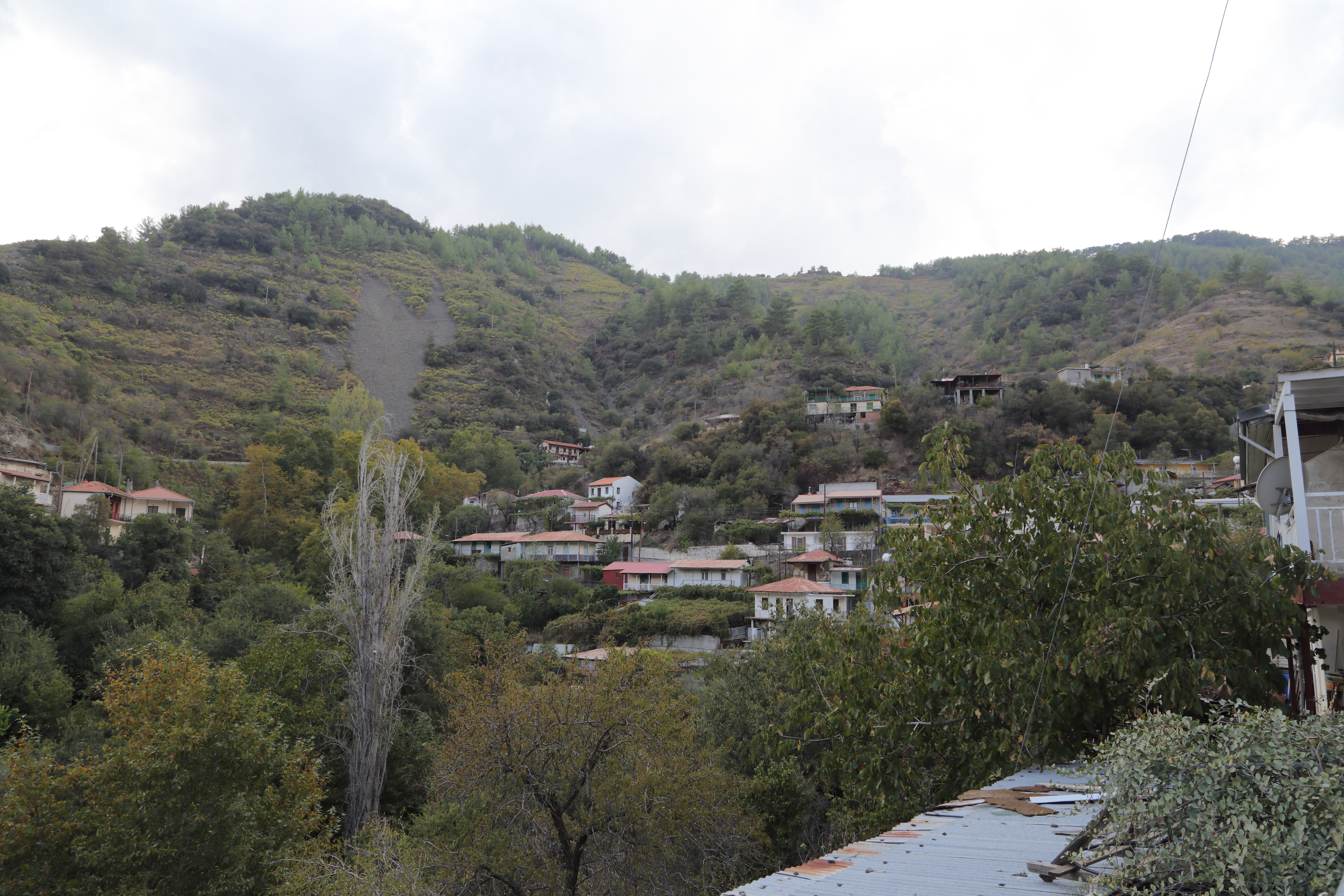

- Location in Cyprus
- Coordinates: 34°57′43″N 32°45′2″E
- Country: Cyprus
- District: Nicosia District
- Elevation: 2,838 ft (865 m)

Population (2001)
  - Total: 39
- Time zone: UTC+2 (EET)
  - Summer (DST): UTC+3 (EEST)

Mylikouri (Greek: Μηλικούρι; Turkish: Milikur) is a small village in the Nicosia District of Cyprus, located just south of Kykkos Monastery.
