= Alithinou =

Alithinou: Αληθινού (Greek); Alitinu (Turkish)
- Village
- Location in Cyprus
- Coordinates: 34°56′50″N 33°1′48″E
- Country: Cyprus
- District: Nicosia District

Population (2001)
  - Total: 9
- Time zone: UTC+2 (EET)
  - Summer (DST): UTC+3 (EEST)

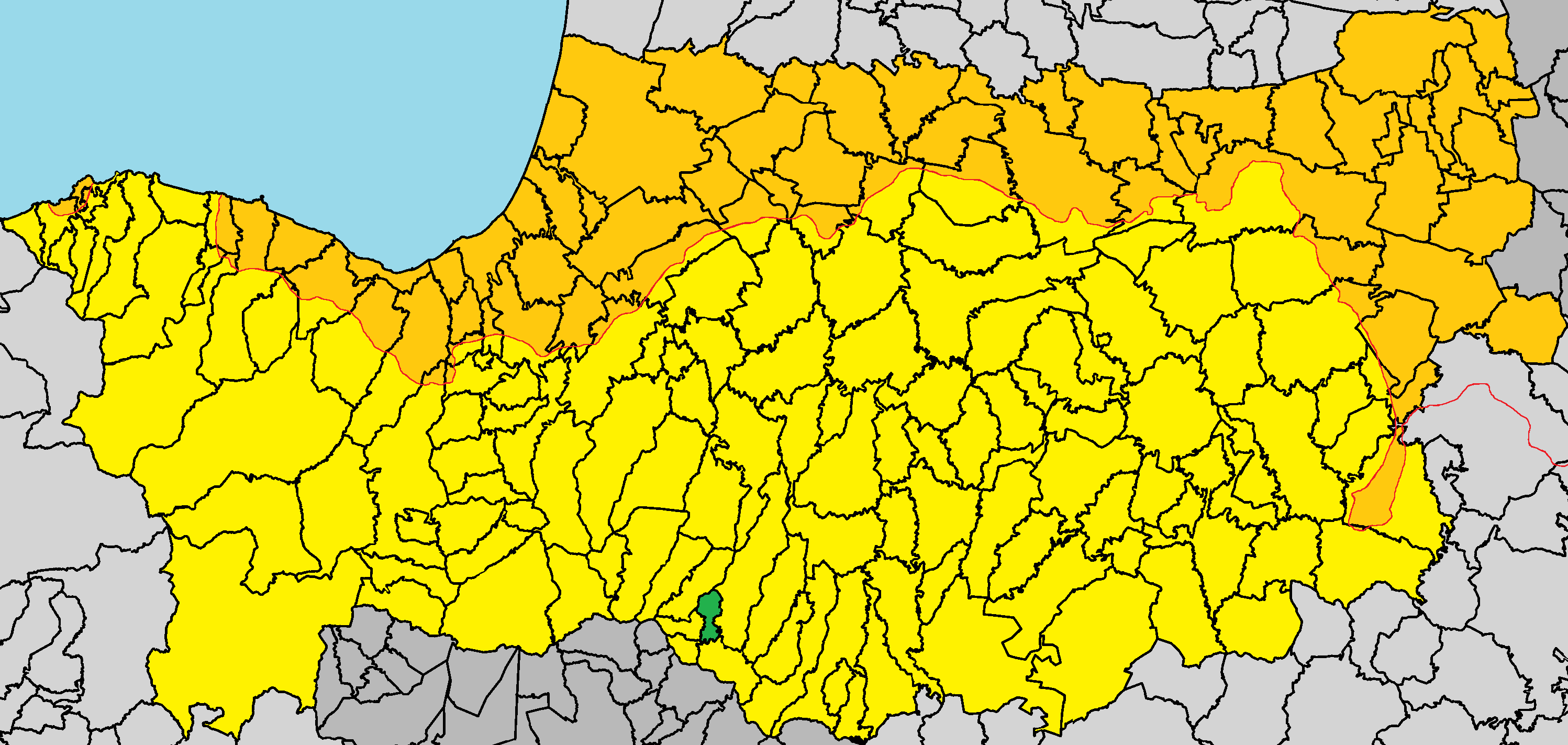
Alithinou in Nicosia District

Alithinou (Greek: Αληθινού; Turkish: Alitinu) is a small village in the Nicosia District of Cyprus, located near Platanistasa.
