= Kampos, Cyprus =

Kambos: Κάμπος (Greek); Gambo (Turkish)
- Village
- Location in Cyprus
- Coordinates: 35°2′26″N 32°43′56″E
- Country: Cyprus
- District: Nicosia District

Population (2001)
  - Total: 426
- Time zone: UTC+2 (EET)
  - Summer (DST): UTC+3 (EEST)

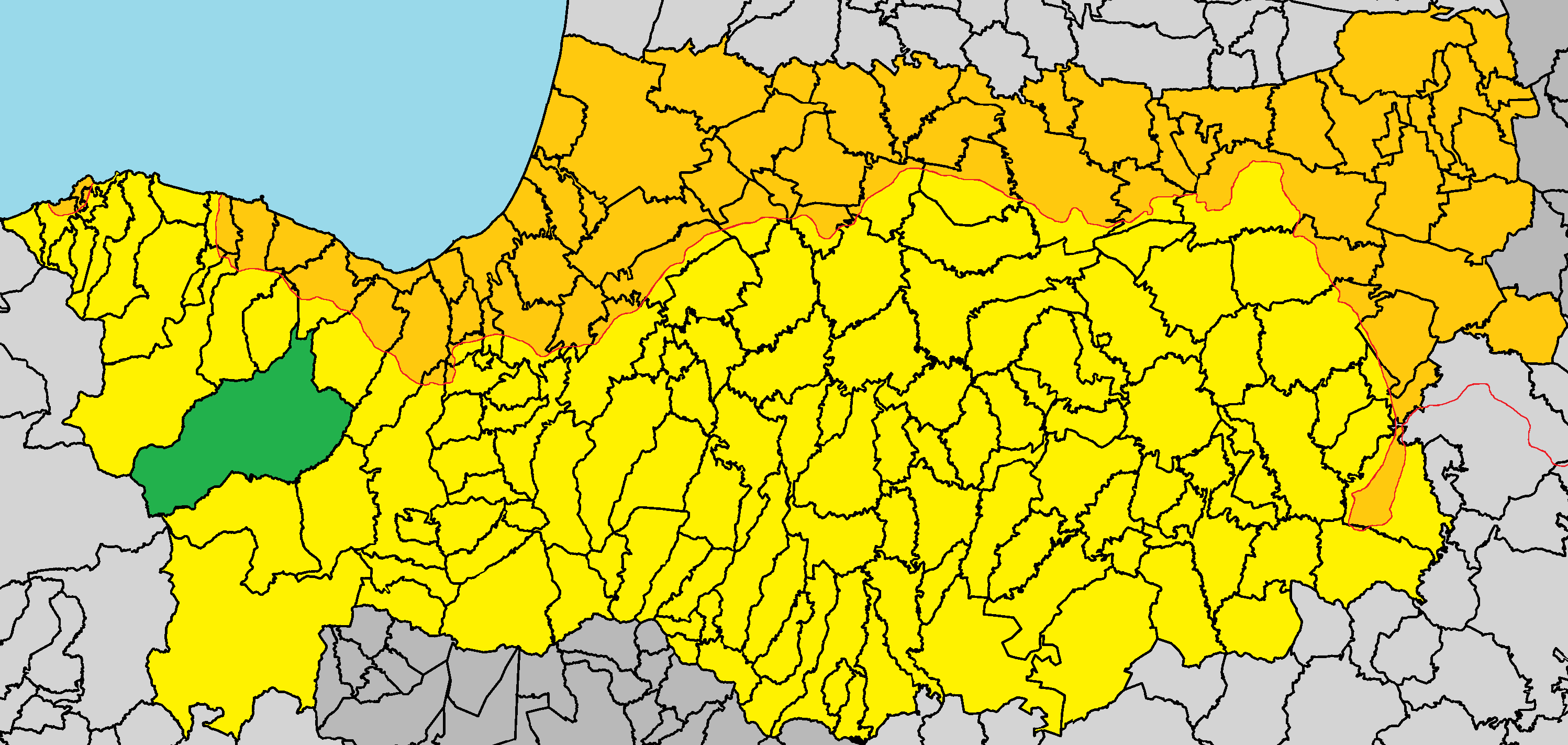
Kampos, Nicosia District

Kampos (Greek: Κάμπος; Turkish: Gambo) is a village in the Nicosia District of Cyprus, located in the Paphos Forest.
