= Agios Theodoros Tilliria =

Agios Theodoros Tilliria: Ayios Theodhoros Τηλλυρίας (Greek); Bozdağ (Turkish)
- Location in Cyprus
- Coordinates: 35°10′28″N 32°38′32″E
- Country: Cyprus
- District: Nicosia District
- Time zone: UTC+2 (EET)
  - Summer (DST): UTC+3 (EEST)

Agios Theodoros Tilliria (Greek: Αγίος Θεοδώρος Τηλλυρίας; Turkish: Bozdağ) is a village located in the Nicosia District of Cyprus, west of Kato Pyrgos.
