= Temvria =

Temvria: Τεμβρια (Greek); Temvria (Turkish)
- Village
- Location in Cyprus
- Coordinates: 35°1′42″N 32°53′25″E
- Country: Cyprus
- District: Nicosia District
- Municipality: Youth President: Savva Andreas

Population (2001)
  - Total: 540
- Time zone: UTC+2 (EET)
  - Summer (DST): UTC+3 (EEST)

Temvria (Greek: Τεμβρια; Turkish: Temvria) is a village in the Nicosia District of Cyprus, located 2 km south of Evrychou.
