= Pigenia =

Pigenia: Πηγαίνια (Greek); Piyenya (Turkish)
- Village
- Location in Cyprus
- Coordinates: 35°10′9″N 32°39′24″E
- Country: Cyprus
- District: Nicosia District

Population (2001)
  - Total: 123
- Time zone: UTC+2 (EET)
  - Summer (DST): UTC+3 (EEST)

Pigenia (Greek: Πηγαίνια; Turkish: Piyenya) is a small village in the Nicosia District of Cyprus, southwest of Kato Pyrgos. The hamlet of Challeri (Χαλλερι) is a part of the municipality.
