= Linou =

Linou: Λινού (Greek); Linu (Turkish)
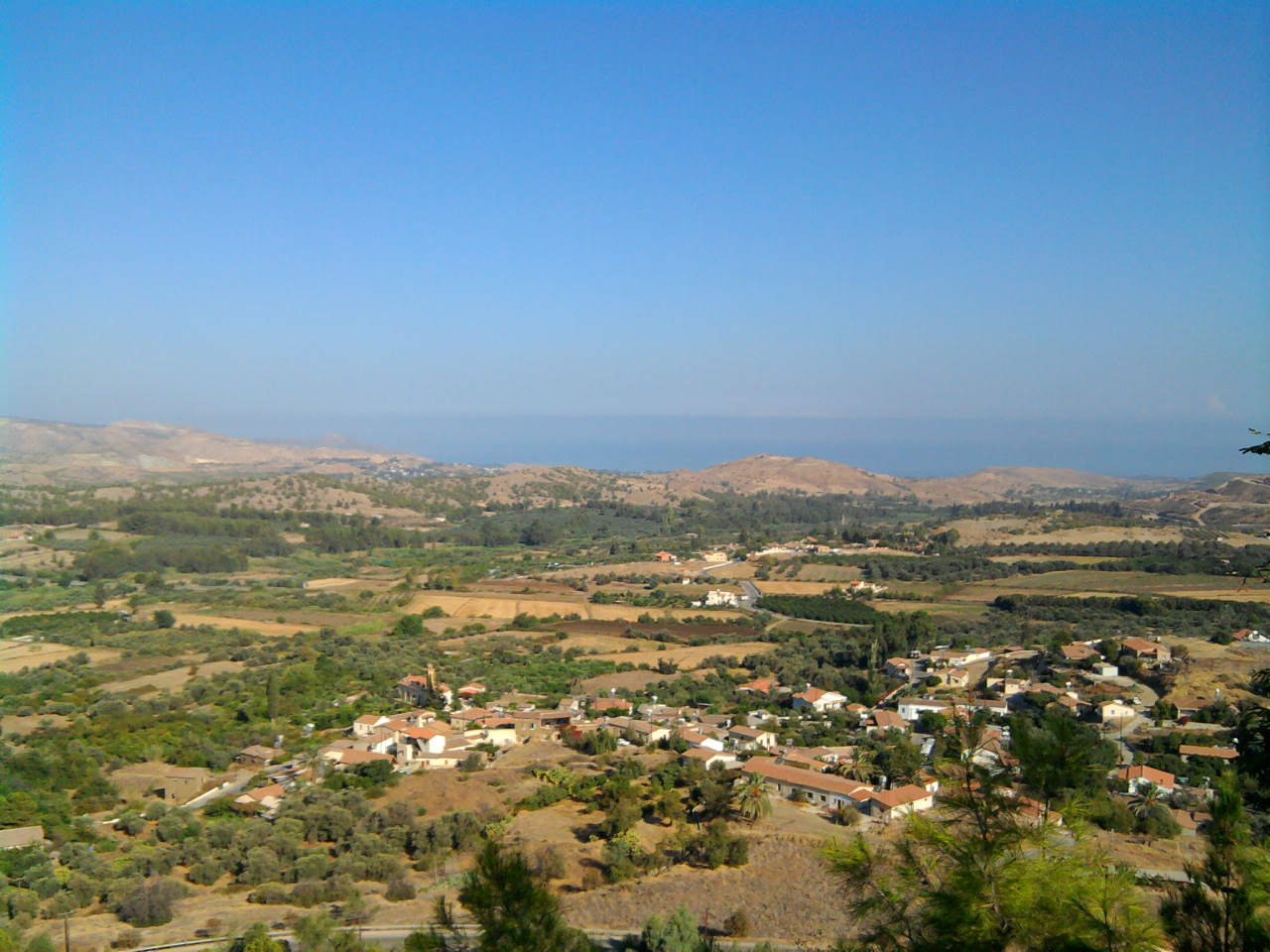

- Location in Cyprus
- Coordinates: 35°4′23″N 32°53′33″E
- Country: Cyprus
- District: Nicosia District

Population (2001)
  - Total: 207
- Time zone: UTC+2 (EET)
  - Summer (DST): UTC+3 (EEST)
- Website: www.linou.org.cy

Linou (Greek: Λινού; Turkish: Linu) is a remote village in the Nicosia District of Cyprus, located south of the Skouriotissa mines and 5 km north of Evrychou with a population of 207, 25% of them refugees.

Linou's earliest evidence of habitation dates back to the Middle Ages. The name of the village, however, appears to have ancient Greek roots, suggesting life in the region since antiquity; on old maps it is marked as Linu. Linou – often shown on local maps as Linou-Flasou – is built on the right of the river valley Karkoti at an approximate altitude of 310 meters above sea level. The village receives an average annual rainfall of about 360 millimeters. In the village, some of the older residents own plots of farmland where they cultivate olives, citrus fruits, some vegetables (peas and tomatoes), wheat, legumes and a few types of fruit tree (apple, pear, plum and mespilies). There are also large areas of uncultivated land, occupied by wild natural vegetation, mostly pine, together with thyme, rosemary, and hawthorn.

Linou has population fluctuations. In 1881 the standing population was 214, which increased to 226 in 1891. This later decreased to 184 in 1901, but a decade later, increased to 189, to 201 in 1921 and 252 in 1931. In 1946, occupants of Linou numbered 311 (272 Greek Cypriots and 39 Turkish Cypriots), which later increased to 338 in 1960 (320 Greek Cypriots and 18 Turkish Cypriots). After 1964, as a result of intercommunal riots that followed the rebellion of the Turkish Cypriots, the few Turkish Cypriot inhabitants of Linou left the village and moved to the adjacent mixed Turkish Cypriot villages. In 1973, the population of the village was 300 (all Greek Cypriots), which then increased to 349 in 1976, but decreased to 332 in 1982. The last census, in 2001, showed 207, all Cypriot inhabitants.
