= Agios Theodoros, Nicosia =

Agios Theodoros: Αγίος Θεοδώρος (Greek); Aytotoro (Turkish)
- Village
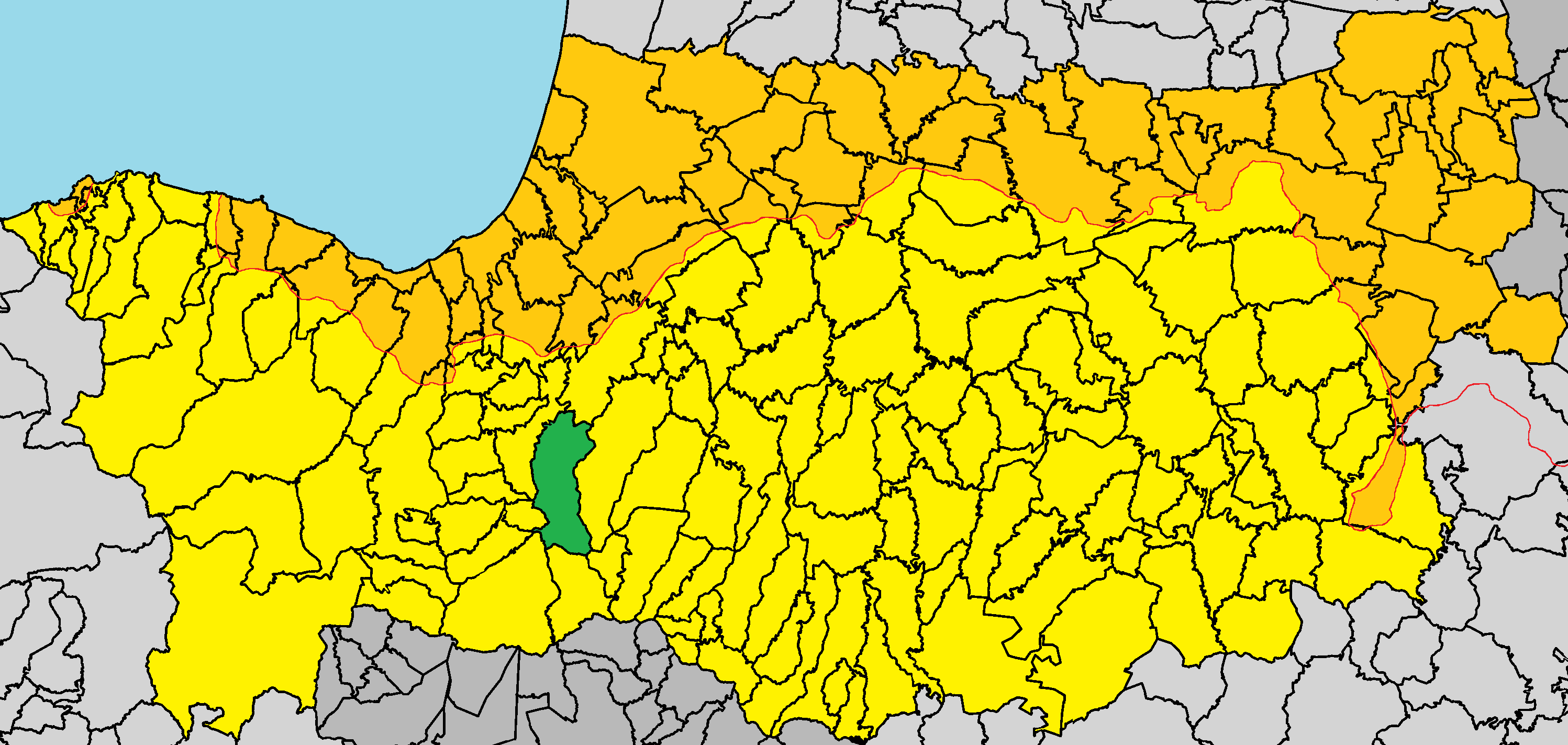

- Location in Cyprus
- Coordinates: 35°2′29″N 32°55′43″E
- Country: Cyprus
- District: Nicosia District

Population (2001)
  - Total: 67
- Time zone: UTC+2 (EET)
  - Summer (DST): UTC+3 (EEST)

Agios Theodoros (Greek: Αγίος Θεοδώρος; Turkish: Aytotoro) is a village located in the Nicosia District of Cyprus, east of the town of Evrychou.
