= Agia Marina, Nicosia =

Agia Marina: Άγια Μαρίνα (Greek); Aymarina (Turkish)
- Location in Cyprus
- Coordinates: 35°03′00″N 33°03′0″E
- Country: Cyprus
- District: Nicosia District

Population
  - Total: 628
- Time zone: UTC+2 (EET)
  - Summer (DST): UTC+3 (EEST)

Agia Marina (Greek: Άγια Μαρίνα; Turkish: Aymarina) is a village located in the Nicosia District of Cyprus, around 40 km (25 mi) west of Nicosia.
