= Kato Koutrafas =

Kato Koutrafas: Κάτω Κουτραφάς (Greek); Aşağı Kutrafa (Turkish)
- Village
- Location in Cyprus
- Coordinates: 35°6′8″N 32°58′40″E
- Country: Cyprus
- District: Nicosia District
- Municipality: Costas Ploutarchou

Population (2001)
  - Total: 14
- Time zone: UTC+2 (EET)
  - Summer (DST): UTC+3 (EEST)

Kato Koutrafas (Greek: Κάτω Κουτραφάς; Turkish: Aşağı Kutrafa) is a small village in the Nicosia District of Cyprus, just off the main road linking Astromeritis and Kakopetria.
