= List of endemic plants of Cyprus =

Cyprus is home to several dozen endemic species and subspecies of plants. The World Geographical Scheme for Recording Plant Distributions treats Cyprus as a botanical country.

Plants are listed alphabetically by plant family.

== Amaranthaceae ==
- Bosea cypria Boiss. ex Hook.f.

== Amaryllidaceae ==
- Allium autumnale P.H.Davis
- Allium cupani subsp. cyprium Meikle
- Allium cyprium Brullo
  - Allium cyprium subsp. cyprium – Troödos Mts.
  - Allium cyprium subsp. lefkarense (Brullo, Pavone & Salmeri) Christodoulou & Hand
- Allium exaltatum (Meikle) Brullo, Pavone, Salmeri & Venora
- Allium marathasicum Brullo, Pavone & Salmeri
- Allium meikleanum Brullo, Pavone & Salmeri
- Allium willeanum Holmboe

== Apicaceae ==
- Bupleurum sintenisii Asch. & Urb. ex Huter – east-central and southeastern Cyprus
- Dichoropetalum kyriakae (Hadjik. & Alziar) Hand & Hadjik
- Pimpinella cypria Boiss.
- Scaligeria alziarii Hand, Hadjik. & Zetzsche

== Araceae ==
- Arum cylindraceum subsp. pitsyllianum Hadjik.

== Araliaceae ==
- Hedera cypria McAll. – Troödos Mts.

== Asparagaceae ==
- Ornithogalum chionophilum Holmboe – Troödos Mts.
- Ornithogalum pedicellare Boiss. & Kotschy
- Scilla lochiae (Meikle) Speta – Troödos Mts.
- Scilla morrisii Meikle – Troödos Mts.

== Asteraceae ==
- Anthemis plutonia Meikle
  - Anthemis plutonia var. artemisioides (Holmboe) Oberpr. & Vogt
  - Anthemis plutonia var. plutonia
- Anthemis tricolor Boiss.
- Carlina pygmaea Holmboe
- Centaurea akamantis T.Georgiadis & Hadjik
- Centaurea calcitrapa subsp. angusticeps (H.Lindb.) Meikle
- Centaurea cyprensis (Holub) T.Georgiadis
- Cicerbita cyprica (Rech.f.) M.Güzel – Troodos Mts.
- Cynara makrisii Hand & Hadjik
- Lactuca tetrantha B.L.Burtt & P.H.Davis – Troodos Mts.
- Onopordum cyprium Eig
- Pseudopodospermum troodeum (Boiss.) Zaika, Sukhor. & N.Kilian
- Ptilostemon chamaepeuce var. cyprius Greuter
- Senecio glaucus subsp. cyprius – western and southwestern Cyprus
- Taraxacum aphrogenes Meikle – southwestern Cyprus
- Taraxacum holmboei H.Lindb. – Troodos Mts.

== Boraginaceae ==
- Onosma caespitosa Kotschy
- Onosma fruticosa Sm.
- Onosma troodi Kotschy

== Brassicaceae ==
- Arabis cypria Holmboe – northern and northeastern Cyprus
- Arabis kennedyae Meilke – western Cyprus
- Arabis purpurea Sm. – Troödos Mts.
- Erysimum kykkoticum Hadjik. & Alziar
- Noccaea cypria (Bornm.) F.K.Mey. – western Cyprus
- Odontarrhena akamasica (B.L.Burtt) Španiel, Al-Shehbaz, D.A.German & Marhold – western Cyprus
- Odontarrhena chondrogyna (B.L.Burtt) Španiel, Al-Shehbaz, D.A.German & Marhold – southwestern Cyprus
- Odontarrhena troodi (Boiss.) Španiel, Al-Shehbaz, D.A.German & Marhold – western Cyprus

== Campanulaceae ==
- Campanula veneris Carlström
- Solenopsis antiphonitis Hadjik. & Hand
- Solenopsis meikleana Brullo, C.Brullo, Cambria, V.Tomas.

== Caprifoliaceae ==
- Lomelosia cyprica (Post) Greuter & Burdet
- Pterocephalus multiflorus Poech
  - Pterocephalus multiflorus subsp. multiflorus
  - Pterocephalus multiflorus subsp. obtusifolius Holmboe
- Valeriana orbiculata Sm.

== Caryophyllaceae ==
- Arenaria rhodia subsp. cypria (Holmboe) McNeill – western Cyprus
- Dianthus cyprius A.K.Jacks. & Turrill – northern and northeastern Cyprus
- Dianthus strictus subsp. troodi (Post) B.F.Osoriol & Seraphim ex Greuter & Burdet – western Cyprus
- Minuartia sintenisii (H.Lindb.) Rech.f. – western Cyprus
- Petrorhagia kennedyae (A.K.Jacks. & Turrill) P.W.Ball & Heywood
- Sabulina subtilis subsp. filicaulis (H.Lindb.) Dillenb. & Kadereit
- Saponaria cypria Boiss.
- Silene fraudatrix Meikle
- Silene galataea Boiss.
- Silene gemmata Meikle
- Silene laevigata Sm.
- Silene microsperma subsp. cypria Eggens, F.Jafari & Oxelman – Famagusta

== Cistaceae ==
- Cistus × akamantis Demoly (C. monspeliensis × C. parviflorus × C. salviifolius)
- Helianthemum obtusifolium Dunal
- Helianthemum salicifolium var. glabrum Meikle – north-central Cyprus

== Colchicaceae ==
- Colchicum troodi Kotschy

== Convolvulaceae ==
- Convolvulus × cyprius Boiss. (C. lineatus × C. oleifolius)

== Crassulaceae ==
- Rosularia globulariifolia subsp. pallidiflora (Holmboe) Yıld.
- Sedum cyprium A.K.Jacks. & Turrill
- Sedum eriocarpum subsp. porphyreum (Kotschy) 't Hart
- Sedum lampusae (Kotschy) Boiss.
- Sedum microstachyum (Kotschy) Boiss.

== Cyperaceae ==
- Carex cyprica Molina Gonz., Acedo & Llamas
- Carex troodi Turrill – western Cyprus
- Cyperus cyprius Post – western Cyprus

== Euphorbiaceae ==
- Euphorbia cassia subsp. rigoi (Boiss. ex Freyn) Holmboe
- Euphorbia lemesian Hadjik., Hand, Christodoulou & Frajman
- Euphorbia veneris M.L.S.Khan – western Cyprus

== Fabaceae ==
- Astragalus cyprius Boiss.
- Astragalus macrocarpus subsp. lefkarensis Meikle & Kirchhoff – western Cyprus, above Pano Lefkara
- Bituminaria kyreniae Giusso, C.Brullo, Brullo, Cambria & Miniss.
- Genista fasselata subsp. crudelis (Meikle) Chrtek & B.Slavík
- Hedysarum cyprium Boiss.
- Trifolium campestre subsp. paphium Meikle

== Fagaceae ==
- Quercus alnifolia Poech – Troödos Mts.
- Quercus × campitica Hadjik. & Hand (Q. alnifolia × Q. coccifera)

== Hypericaceae ==
- Hypericum repens L.

== Iridaceae ==
- Crocus cyprius Boiss. & Kotschy – western Troödos Mts.
- Crocus hartmannianus Holmboe – N. & EC. Cyprus
- Crocus veneris Tapp. ex Poech
- Gladiolus triphyllus (Sm.) Ker Gawl

== Lamiaceae ==
- Acanthoprasium integrifolium (Benth.) Ryding
- Clinopodium troodi subsp. troodi – Troödos Mts.
- Micromeria chionistrae Meikle – western Cyprus
- Nepeta italica subsp. troodi (Holmboe) A.L.Budantzev
- Origanum cordifolium (Montbret & Aucher ex Benth.) Vogel – western Cyprus
- Phlomis brevibracteata Turrill
- Phlomis cypria Post
  - Phlomis cypria var. cypria
  - Phlomis cypria var. occidentalis Meikle – southwestern Cyprus
- Salvia veneris Hedge
- Salvia willeana (Holmboe) Hedge – western Cyprus
- Scutellaria cypria Rech.f. – western Cyprus
  - Scutellaria cypria subsp. cypria – western Cyprus
  - Scutellaria cypria subsp. elatior (Meikle) Hand – western Cyprus
- Scutellaria sibthorpii (Benth.) Halácsy
- Sideritis cypria Post
- Teucrium cyprium Boiss. – western Cyprus
- Teucrium divaricatum subsp. canescens (Čelak.) Holmboe
- Teucrium karpasiticum Hadjik. & Hand
- Teucrium kyreniae (P.H.Davis) Hadjik. & Hand
- Teucrium micropodioides Rouy
- Teucrium salaminium Hadjik. & Hand
- Thymus integer Griseb.

== Lentibulariaceae ==
- Pinguicula crystallina Sm. – western Cyprus

== Liliaceae ==
- Tulipa akamasica Christodoulou, Hand & Charalamb.
- Tulipa cypria Stapf ex Turrill

== Orchidaceae ==
- Ophrys argolica subsp. elegans (Renz) E.Nelson
- Ophrys × cailliauana P.Delforge (O. bornmuelleri × O. sphegodes subsp. mammosa)
- Ophrys × jansenii P.Delforge (O. bornmuelleri × O. lutea subsp. galilaea)
- Ophrys × paphosiana H.Baumann & Künkele (O. kotschyi × O. umbilicata)
- Orchis × tochniana Kreutz & Scraton (O. italica × O. punctulata)
- Serapias × cypria H.Baumann & Künkele (S. bergonii × S. levantina)

== Orobanchaceae ==
- Odontites linkii subsp. cyprius (Boiss.) Bolliger
- Orobanche zosimii (M.J.Y.Foley) Domina

== Papaveraceae ==
- Corydalis rutifolia (Sm.) DC. – Troödos Mts.
- Papaver cyprium (Chrtek & B.Slavík) M.V.Agab., Christodoulou & Hand
- Papaver paphium M.V.Agab., Christodoulou & Hand
- Roemeria meiklei (Kadereit) Banfi, Bartolucci, J.-M.Tison & Galasso

== Pinaceae ==
- Cedrus libani var. brevifolia Hook.f. – Troödos Mts.

== Plumbaginaceae ==
- Limonium ammochostianum Erben, Christodoulou, Hand & Kefalas
- Limonium cyprium (Meikle) Hand & Buttler
- Limonium karpasiticum Kefalas, Erben, Christodoulou & Hand
- Limonium mucronulatum (H.Lindb.) Greuter & Burdet
- Limonium paralimniticum Christodoulou, Erben, Hand & Kefalas

== Poaceae ==
- Aegilops × insulae-cypri H.Scholz (A. geniculata × A. peregrina)
- Agrostis cypricola H.Lindb.
- Arrhenatherum elatius subsp. cypricola (H.Scholz) Romero Zarco
- Poa sintenisii H.Lindb. – Troodos Mts.
- Rostraria hadjikyriakou Christodoulou & Hand
- Sporobolus hadjikyriakou (Raus & H.Scholz) P.M.Peterson

== Portulacaceae ==
- Portulaca edulis Danin & Bagella

== Primulaceae ==
- Cyclamen cyprium Kotschy

== Ranunculaceae ==
- Delphinium fissum subsp. caseyi (B.L.Burtt) C.Blanché & Molero
- Ranunculus cyprius (Boiss.) Chrtek & B.Slavík
- Ranunculus kykkoensis Meikle
- Ranunculus leptaleus DC.

== Rosaceae ==
- Rosa chionistrae H.Lindb.

== Rubiaceae ==
- Rubia laurae (Holmboe) Airy Shaw
- Thliphthisa suberosa (Sm.) P.Caputo & Del Guacchio

== Urticaceae ==
- Urtica cypria (H.Lindb.) Hand
