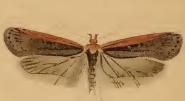

Scientific classification
- Domain: Eukaryota
- Kingdom: Animalia
- Phylum: Arthropoda
- Class: Insecta
- Order: Lepidoptera
- Family: Depressariidae
- Genus: Depressaria
- Species: D. pimpinellae

Binomial name
- Depressaria pimpinellae Zeller, 1839

Synonyms
- List: Depressaria reichlini Heinemann, 1870; Depressaria pimpinellae ab. levisticae Krulikowsky, 1908; Depressaria hungarica Szent-Ivány, 1943; Depressaria uhrikmeszarosi Szent-Ivány, 1943

= Depressaria pimpinellae =

Species of moth

Depressaria pimpinellae is a moth of the family Depressariidae. It is found in most of Europe, except Ireland, Portugal and most of the Balkan Peninsula.

The wingspan is 16–22 mm. Adults are on wing from September and after overwintering, again in the following spring.

The larvae feed on burnet-saxifrage (Pimpinella saxifraga) and greater burnet-saxifrage (Pimpinella major). They live in a silken spinning.

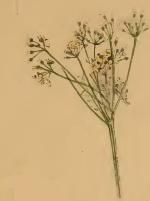
A larval web in an inflorescence of Pimpinella saxifraga

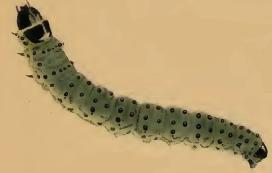
Larva

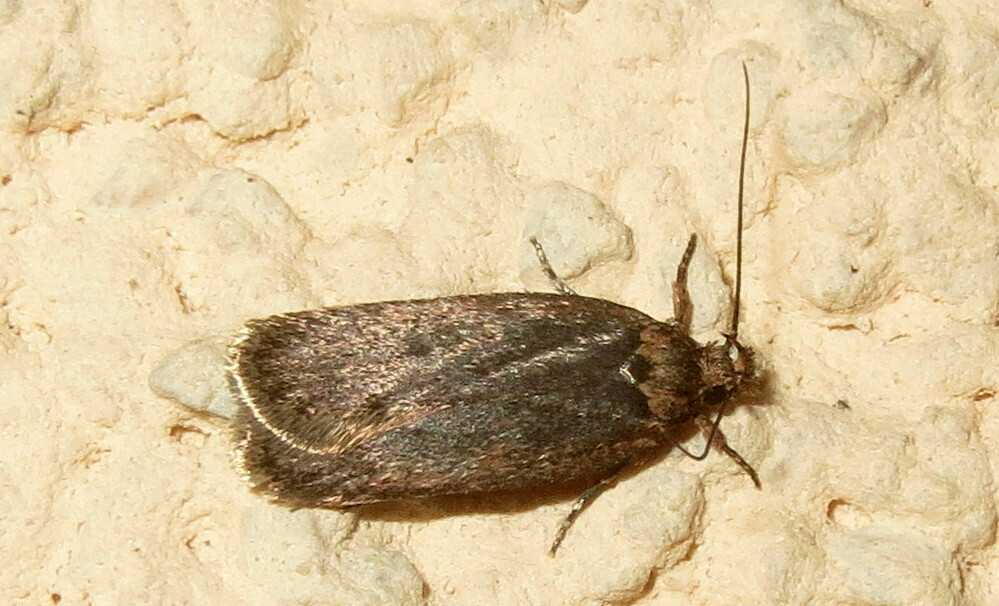
