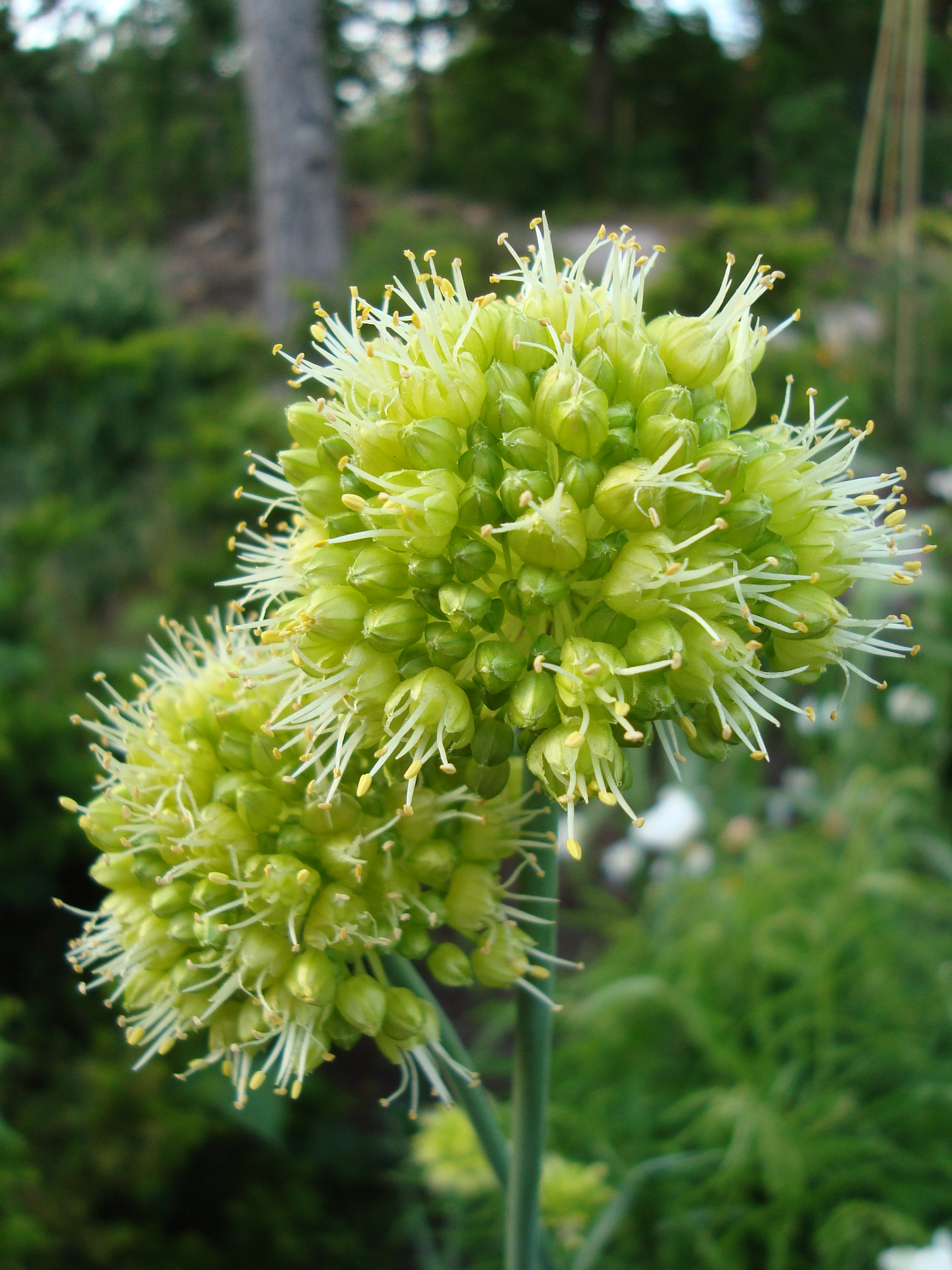

Scientific classification
- Kingdom: Plantae
- Clade: Tracheophytes
- Clade: Angiosperms
- Clade: Monocots
- Order: Asparagales
- Family: Amaryllidaceae
- Subfamily: Allioideae
- Genus: Allium
- Subgenus: A. subg. Polyprason
- Species: A. obliquum

Binomial name
- Allium obliquum L.

Synonyms
- Allium exaltatum Kar. & Kir. ex Ledeb.; Allium luteum F.Dietr.; Allium porrum Georgi 1779, illegitimate homonym not L. 1753; Allium ramosum Jacq. 1781, illegitimate homonym not L. 1753; Camarilla obliqua (L.) Salisb.; Cepa obliqua (L.) Moench; Geboscon obliquum (L.) Raf.; Moenchia obliqua (L.) Medik.

= Allium obliquum =

Species of flowering plant

Allium obliquum, common name lop-sided onion or twisted-leaf onion, is a Eurasian species of wild onion with a range extending from Romania to Mongolia. It is also widely cultivated elsewhere as an ornamental.

Allium obliquum produces an egg-shaped bulb up to 3 cm long. Scape is up to 100 cm tall, round in cross-section. Leaves are flat, shorter than the scape, up to 20 mm across. Umbels are spherical, with many yellow flowers crowded together.
