= South Nicosia-Idalion =

South Nicosia - Idalion: Νότια Λευκωσία - Ιδάλιον (Greek); Güney Lefkoşa - Dali (Turkish)
- Municipality
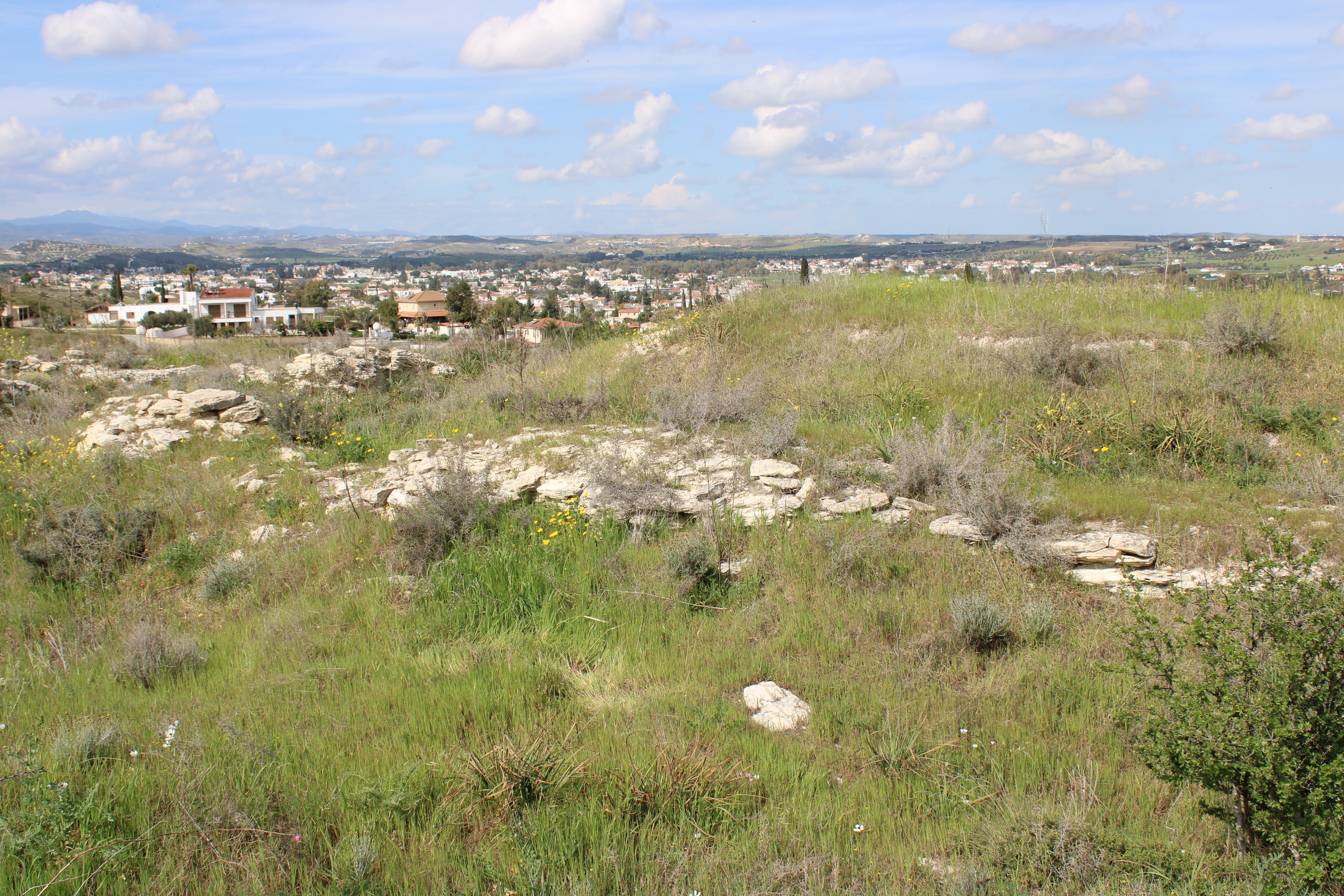
- West acropolis of Idalion

- Location in Cyprus
- Coordinates: 35°0′42″N 33°23′25″E
- Country: Cyprus
- District: Nicosia District
- First settled: 1100 AD
- Established: 1 July 2024

Government
  - Mayor: Stavros Hadjiyiannis
- Elevation: 820 ft (250 m)

Population (2021)
  - Total: 22,632
- Time zone: UTC+2 (EET)
  - Summer (DST): UTC+3 (EEST)
- Website: sni.org.cy

South Nicosia, the outer suburban area south of the centre of Nicosia, Cyprus, became a united municipality on 1 July 2024.

Following local government reform in 2024, a number or communities and one municipality were merged into the new municipality of South Nicosia-Dali.

South Nicosia is a mixed suburban and rural area about 800 ft. (250 metres) above sea level and is dissected by the Gialias River, as well as by its tributaries the Alikos and Almyros. The good geographical location of the area between the cities of Nicosia and Larnaca, its relatively short distance from central Nicosia and its good road connections are factors that contributed to its population growth. The population is a mixture of commuters, industrial workers and those engaged in agriculture.

The table below lists the previous authorities from which the new municipality is composed, which now become municipal districts each with a deputy mayor. The deputy mayors are also members of the municipal council and are included in the councillors column below.

Mun.District	Pop 2021	Pop 2011	Pop 2001	Pop 1992	Pop 1960	M/C	No. Cllrs
Alambra	1,655	1,585	1,140	994	546	C	2
Dali	12,350	10,466	5,834	4,757	2,609	M	8
Lympia	2,911	2,694	2,268	2,030	1,383	C	3
Nisou	2,132	2,179	1,323	1,143	474	C	2
Pera Chorio	3,002	2,637	2,236	1,966	785	C	3
Potamia	582	505	415	402	540	C	2
TOTAL	22,632	20,066	13,216	11,292	6,337		20

Note: Column "M/C" indicates previous status: M (municipality), C (community) or S (settlement)

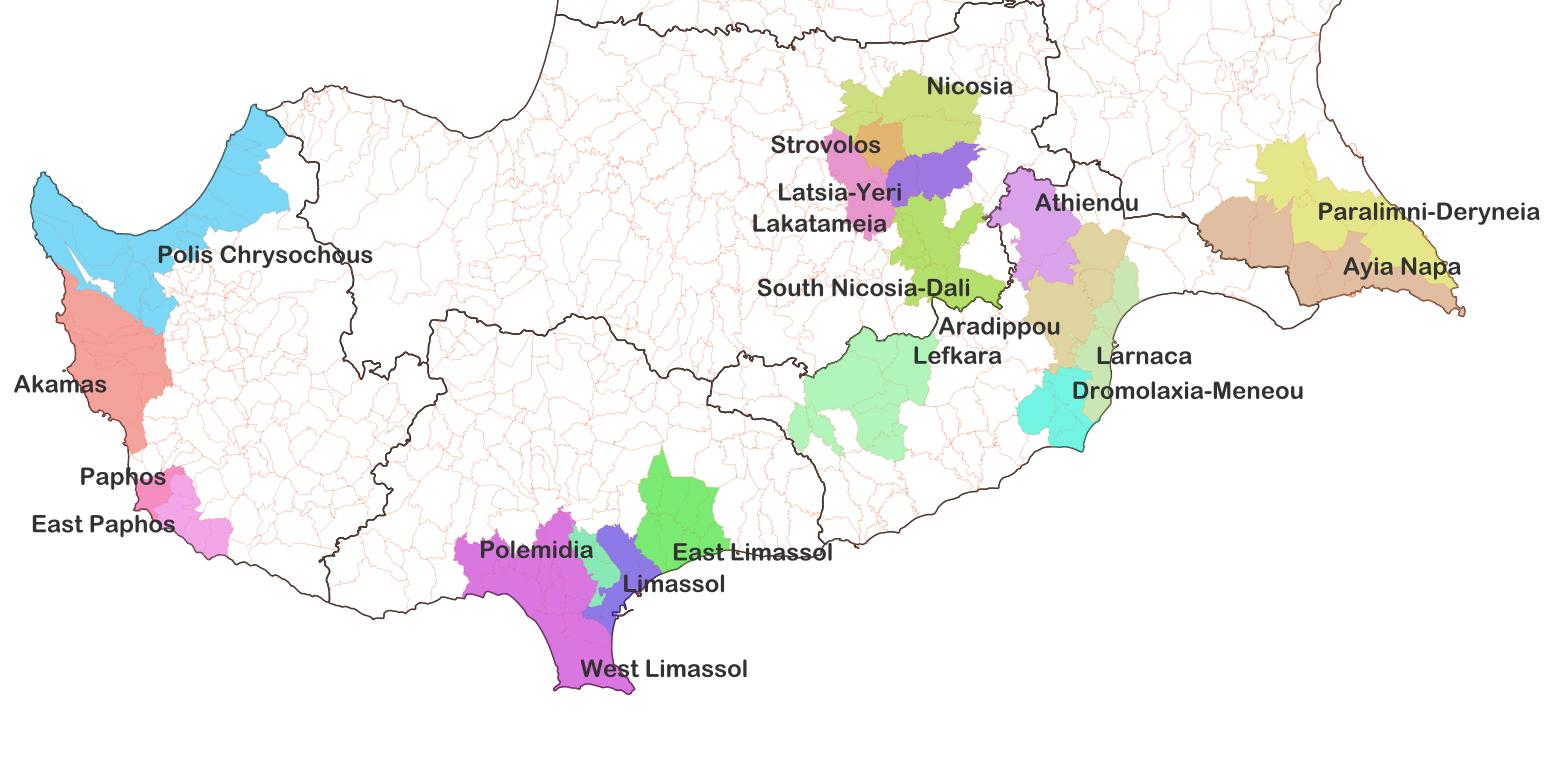
New Municipalities of Cyprus from 2024, showing position of South Nicosia - Dali

The administrative reform was enacted by the Municipalities Law 52(I) of 2022. This created 18 new municipalities by amalgamating 28 municipalities and 63 communities, which become municipal districts of the new municipalities. The municipalities of Strovolos and Paphos remain unchanged.

These 20 new or retained municipalities gained powers over the establishment of a municipal police force, road maintenance, and the responsibilities of school boards (by 2029). The power to issue planning and building permits is transferred away from municipalities to the new Nicosia District Local Government Organisation.

The municipal elections took place on 9 June 2024.

Stavros Hadjiyiannis was elected the first mayor of South Nicosia - Idalion.

Prior to the 2022 reform, the Municipality of Dali (or Idalion) and the Community Councils of Pera Chorio – Nisou, Lythrodontas, Lympia, Ayia Varvara, Alambra, Sia, Mathiatis and Potamia requested that they form a combined authority to provide municipal services, while retaining in being their separate status as communities or municipality. Also, there was established a South Nicosia Local Plan, which implemented a joint planning scheme for the area of Dali, Pera Chorio - Nisou, Lympia, Ayia Varvara,and Alambra.

At that time Pera Chorio and Nisou formed a joint community council (called a complex), having prior to 1991 been an "Improvement Council" consisting of two community councils. Improvement Councils were a type of local authority intermediate between municipalities and community councils, which were abolished in 1999. The two communities now form separate Municipal Districts in the new united municipality (see table above).

Despite the involvement of all the above communities, eventually only Dali, Pera Chorio - Nisou, Lympia, Alambra and Potamia were included in the new joint municipality, as enacted in 2022. The others became part of the Community Service Complex of Macheras (population 8,385 in 2021) , with its seat at Ayia Varvara. Community Complexes were created for the provision of common services to their participating communities, by the Communities (Amendment) (No. 2) Law of 2022. Each Complex is governed by the Services Complex Council, whose members are the mukhtars of the communities participating in the complex.

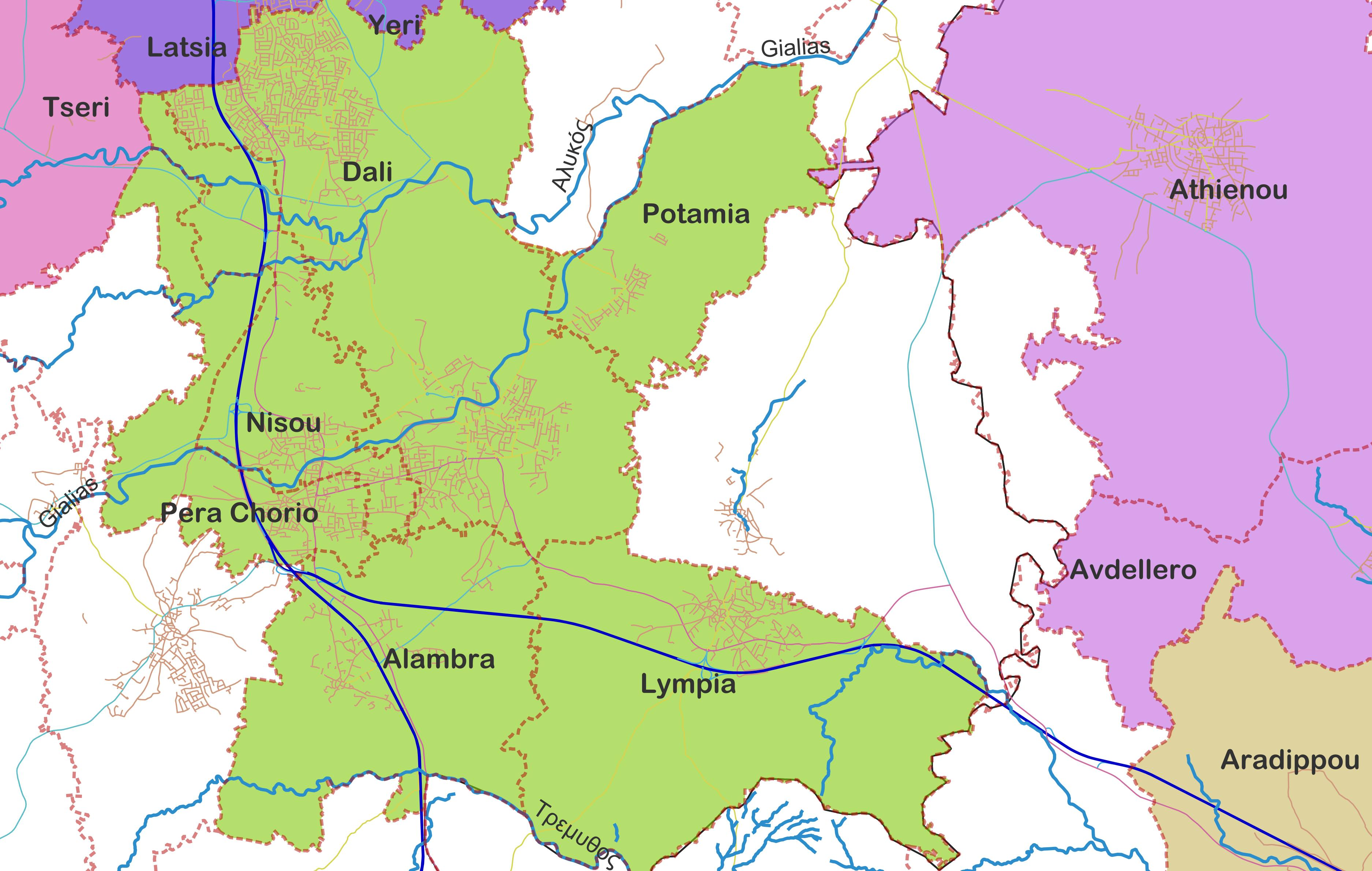
South Nicosia showing municipal districts of South Nicosia - Idalion municipality
