= Lympia =

Lympia: Λύμπια (Greek); Limpia (Turkish)
- Location in Cyprus
- Coordinates: 34°59′49.42″N 33°27′42″E
- Country: Cyprus
- District: Nicosia District

Government
  - Mayor: Michalis Georgiou (Chari)

Population (2011)
  - Total: 2,694
- Time zone: UTC+2 (EET)
  - Summer (DST): UTC+3 (EEST)
- Postal code: 2566
- Website: http://www.lymbia.com/

Lympia or Lymbia (Greek: Λύμπια; Turkish: Limpia) is a large village in the Nicosia District of Cyprus. In 2011 the population was 2,694.

The name derives from the original name of the settlement Olympia.

== History ==
The road leading from Mosfiloti to Lympia, a stone-made bridge was constructed in 1944 over the Tremithos river. 1300 metres north of the bridge, towards the Lympia village, there is a small chapel dedicated to Saint Marina. Next to it there was a shepherds' settlement. When the Ottoman army arrived in these areas from Lefkara, during 1570, it attacked the settlement with cannons, which the Ottomans were trying out for the first time. They started firing against the houses with stone shells and the settlement was destroyed along with the church. The inhabitants that survived took refuge in Lympia village. The day that "Agia Marina" was destroyed was a Tuesday and ever since then the region was named "Kakotriti" (Bad Tuesday). The church of Saint Marina was rebuilt, while signs of caves can still be found in the area of the settlement.

== 2007 Recycling Plant Conflicts ==
In 2007, citizens of the village reacted to government plans to build a Recycling Plant (referred to as 'Chita - XYTA') in a neighbourhood called 'Coshi'. There have been conflicts with police special forces culminating in extreme protest events in the area. During that time, children were taken out of the local school during teaching time and along with their parents and locals entered the Nicosia-Larnaca motorway, in both directions, during morning peak time. Due to the closure of the motorway, there was traffic congestion in the area, with difficulties to those travelling to Larnaca airport. During the motorway take over, locals were throwing flaming cars from up the airlift bridge to the motorway grounds. 200 Lymbiani were called to the Cypriot court for actions related to the events. In order to defuse the situation and get traffic in Cyprus back to normal, the President of the House of Representatives Dimitris Christofias (who later became President of Cyprus) started negotiations for moving the Plant.

== Local Government Reform ==
Following local government reform in 2024, Lympia was merged into the new municipality of South Nicosia-Idalion.
