= Silene fraudatrix =

Scientific classification
- Kingdom: Plantae
- Clade: Tracheophytes
- Clade: Angiosperms
- Clade: Eudicots
- Order: Caryophyllales
- Family: Caryophyllaceae
- Genus: Silene
- Species: S. fraudatrix

Binomial name
- Silene fraudatrix Meikle

Species of flowering plant

Silene fraudatrix is a species of flowering plant in the family Caryophyllaceae. It is sometimes referred to by the common name Alevkaya Sinekkapani. It has a restricted distribution and is endemic to Northern Cyprus, where it is known only from Alevkaya where it is common to Tatlisu.

== Description ==
Slender annual, often branched below with stems to 15 cm long, erect or spreading; flowers few, 1.5 cm across, single or paired in a very loose branched spray; petals rose pink to whitish, notched at the tip and with 2-lobed coronal scales at the throat. More branched forms with white flowers are found later in the season. Flowers from March to May.

== Habitat ==
On rocky mountain slopes under pine and cypress.
