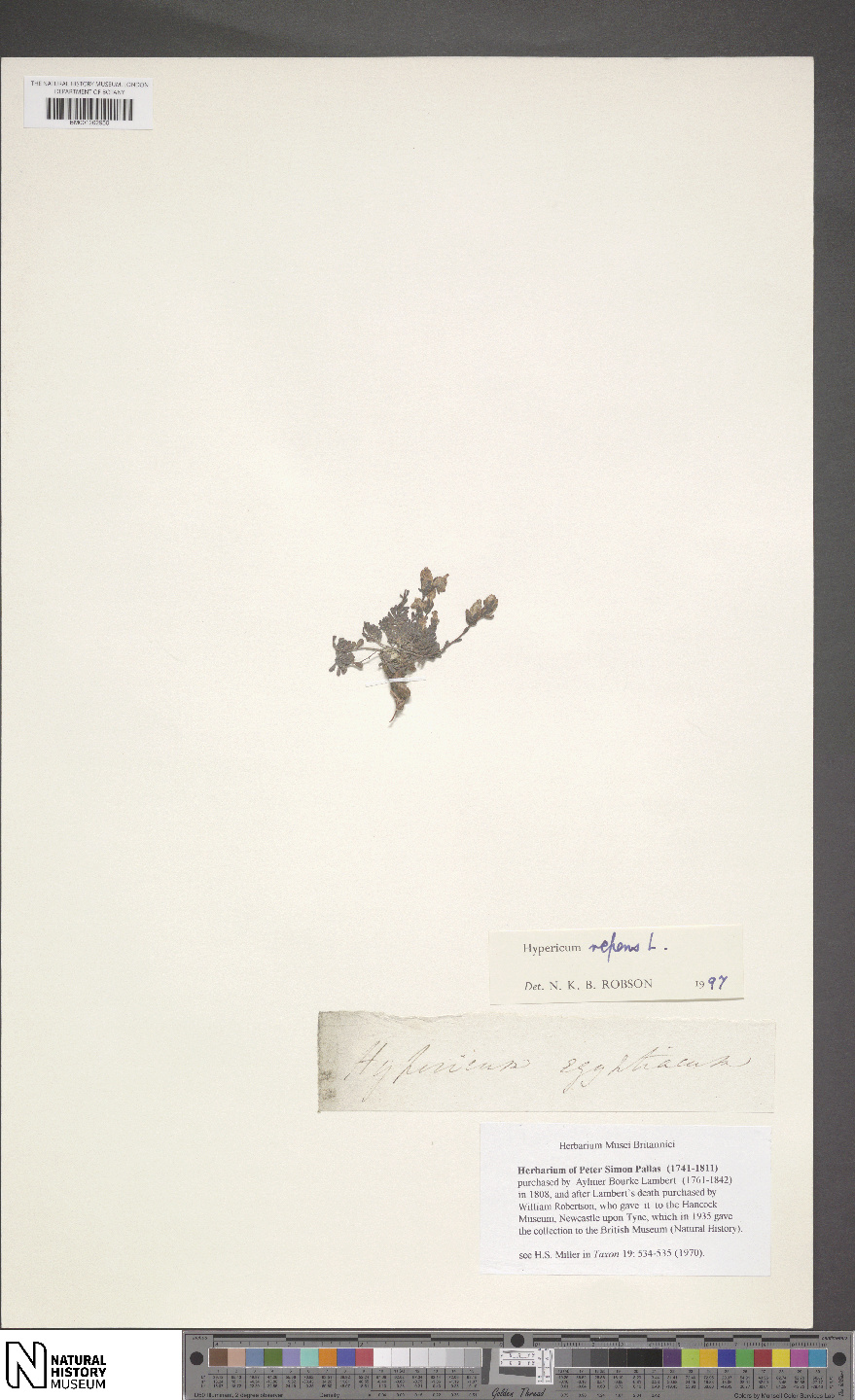

Scientific classification
- Kingdom: Plantae
- Clade: Tracheophytes
- Clade: Angiosperms
- Clade: Eudicots
- Clade: Rosids
- Order: Malpighiales
- Family: Hypericaceae
- Genus: Hypericum
- Section: Hypericum sect. Oligostema
- Species: H. repens

Binomial name
- Hypericum repens L.

= Hypericum repens =

Species of flowering plant

Hypericum repens is a prostrate, perennial herb up to 10 cm high, with rooting, hairless shoots, up to 20 cm long. Leaves opposite, simple, entire, elliptical to narrowly spathulate with rounded top, 5-9 x 3–4 mm and black dots (glands) on the margin. Flowers actinomorphic in cymose inflorescence, petals golden yellow, with red nerves, glands present on sepals and petals. Flowers May–July (August). Fruit a capsule.

== Habitat ==
Dry rocky slopes and openings in pine forest, waste land or field edges, on limestone or igneous formations at 0–1450 m altitude.

== Distribution ==
Endemic to Cyprus, found in Troödos area, Limassol district, (Trimiklini), the Makheras forest (Makheras Monastery, Mandra tou Kambiou), Nicosia area where it is fairly common (Yeri, Latsia, Potamia), Kannavia and Kyrenia area.
