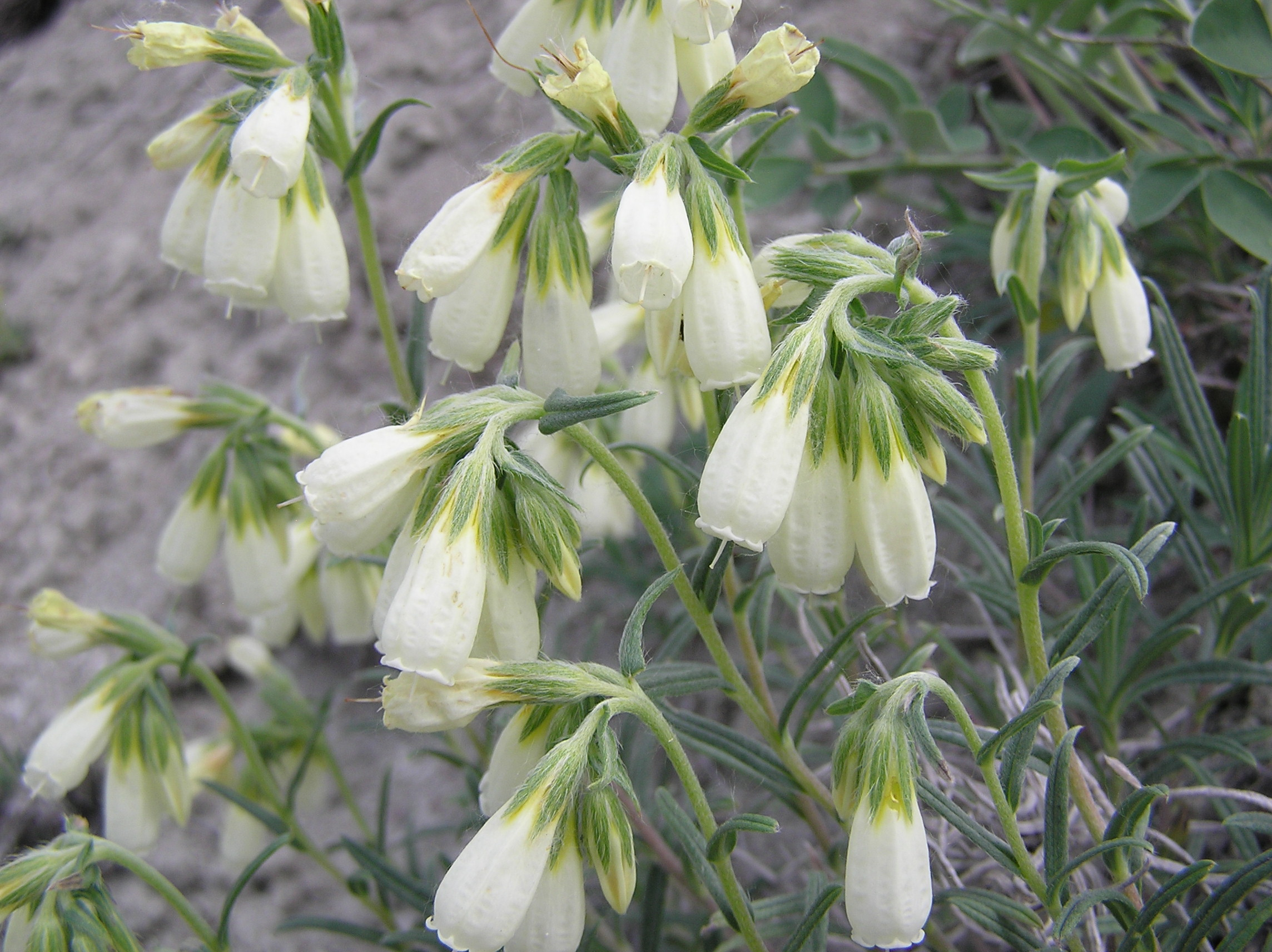
- Onosma simplicissima ssp. volgensis

Scientific classification
- Kingdom: Plantae
- Clade: Embryophytes
- Clade: Tracheophytes
- Clade: Spermatophytes
- Clade: Angiosperms
- Clade: Eudicots
- Clade: Asterids
- Order: Boraginales
- Family: Boraginaceae
- Subfamily: Boraginoideae
- Genus: Onosma; L.

Type species
- Onosma echioides L.

Species
- 235; see text

Synonyms
- Choriantha Riedl (1961); Colsmannia Lehm. (1814); Sava Adans. (1763)

= Onosma =

Genus of flowering plants in the borage family

Onosma is a genus of flowering plants in the family Boraginaceae. They are native to the Mediterranean and western Asia. They grow in dry, sunny habitats with rocky, sandy substrates. Some are popular as rock garden plants.

Estimates of the number of species in the genus range from about 85 or 88 to 150. As of July 2024 Plants of the World Online accepts 235 species. The systematics are unclear and the group is in need of study and revision.

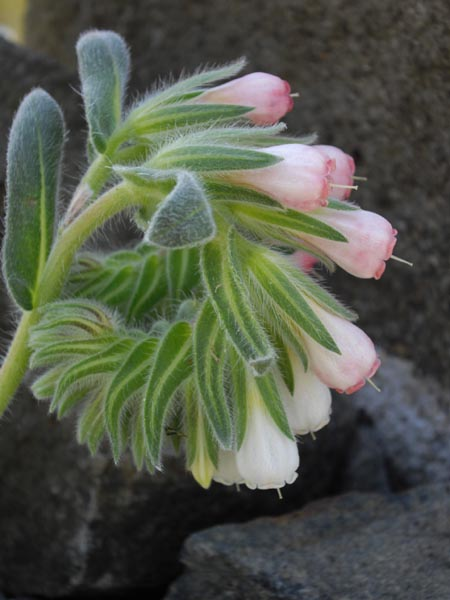
Onosma alborosea

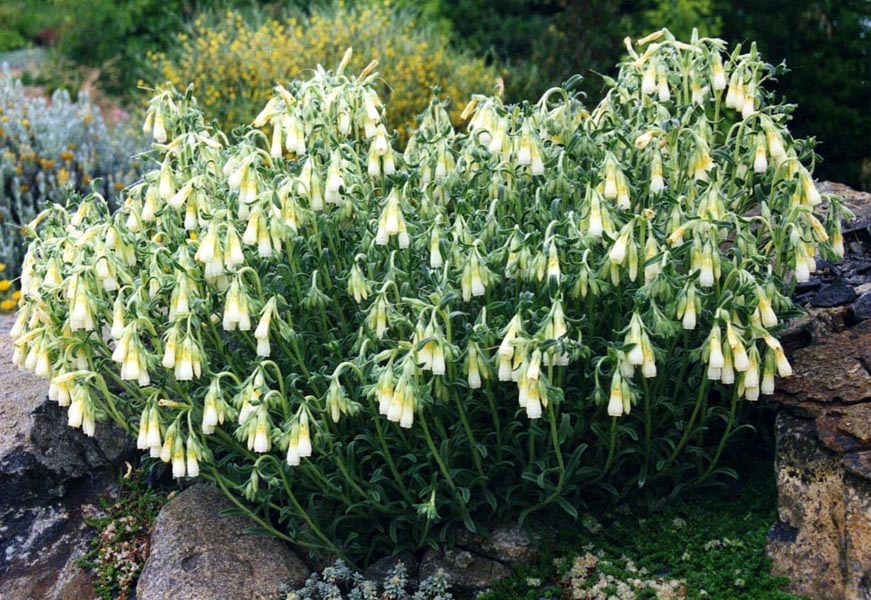
Onosma nana

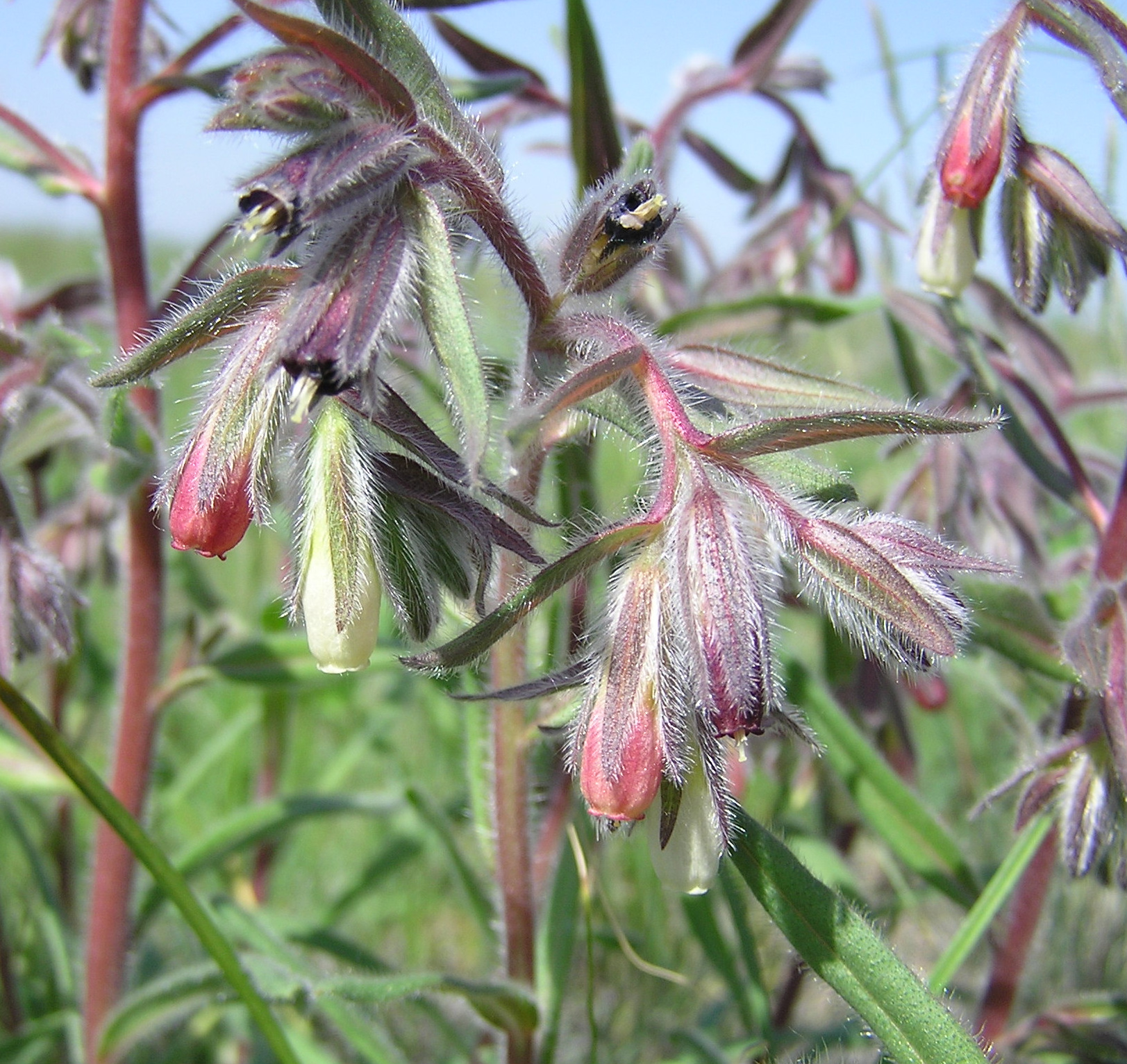
Onosma polychroma

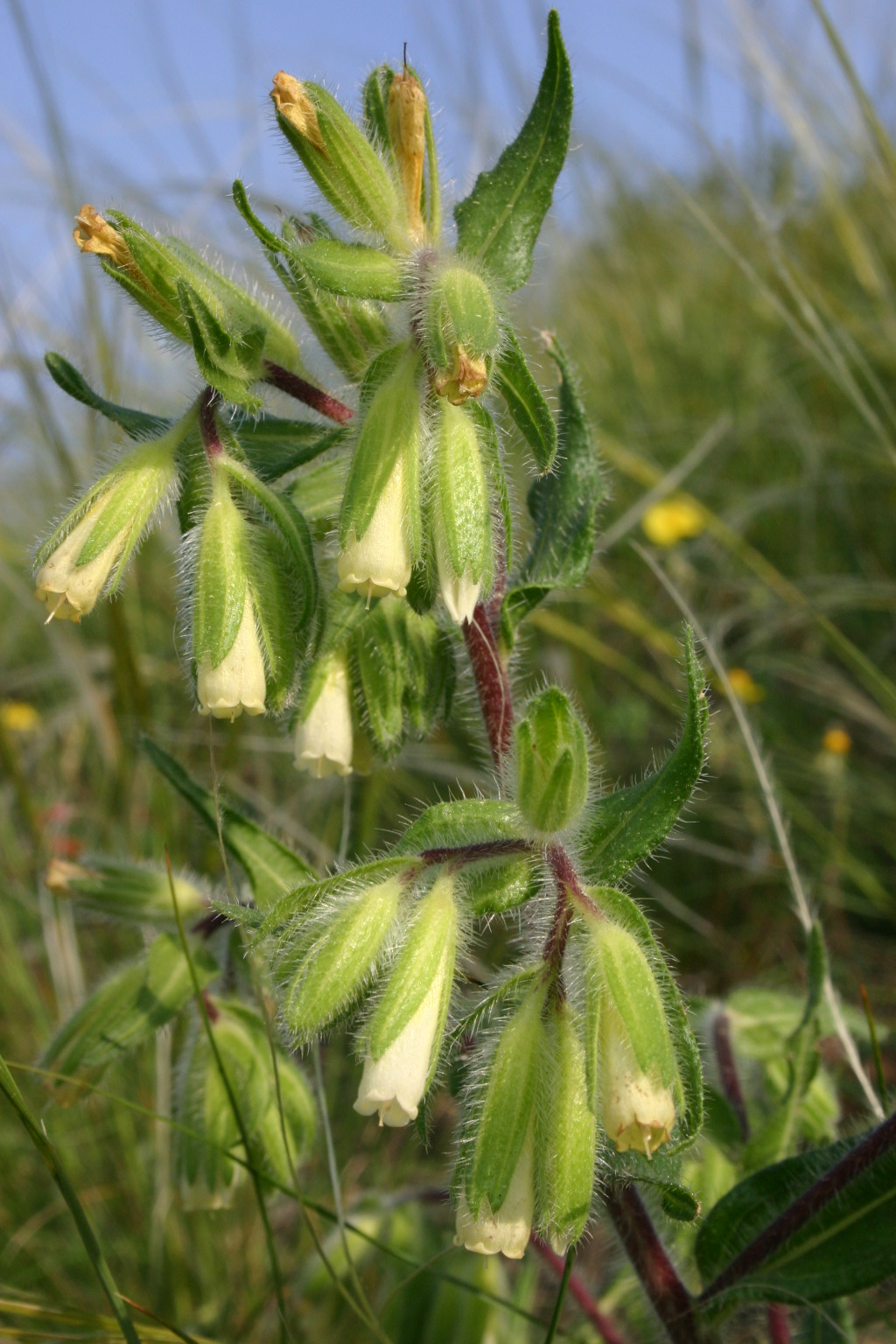
Onosma visianii

== Selected species ==
As of July 2024, Plants of the World Online accepts 235 species. Selected species include:

- Onosma adenopus
- Onosma affinis
- Onosma aksoyii
- Onosma alborosea
- Onosma album
- Onosma apiculatum
- Onosma arenaria
- Onosma atila-ocakii
- Onosma aucheranum
- Onosma beyazoglui
- Onosma borysthenica
- Onosma bourgaei
- Onosma bracteatum
- Onosma bubanii
- Onosma bulbotrichum
- Onosma canescens
- Onosma cassium
- Onosma caucasica
- Onosma caerulescens
- Onosma cingulatum
- Onosma confertum
- Onosma decastichum
- Onosma dalmatica
- Onosma dicedens
- Onosma dichroantha
- Onosma echioides
- Onosma elegantissimum
- Onosma epirotica
- Onosma erectum
- Onosma exsertum
- Onosma farreri
- Onosma fastigiata
- Onosma fistulosum
- Onosma frutescens
- Onosma fruticosa
- Onosma gigantea
- Onosma glomeratum
- Onosma glmelinii
- Onosma graeca
- Onosma helvetica
- Onosma hispidum
- Onosma hookeri
- Onosma irritans
- Onosma isauricum
- Onosma javorkae
- Onosma kaheirei
- Onosma lijiangense
- Onosma liui
- Onosma luquanense
- Onosma maaikangense
- Onosma macrochaeta
- Onosma mertensioides
- Onosma molle
- Onosma multiramaosum
- Onosma nangqenense
- Onosma nanum
- Onosma orientalis
- Onosma paniculatum
- Onosma polioxanthum
- Onosma polychroma
- Onosma pseudoarenaria
- Onosma rascheyana
- Onosma rigida
- Onosma setosa
- Onosma simplicissimum
- Onosma sinicum
- Onosma stelluata
- Onosma straussii
- Onosma stridii
- Onosma taurica
- Onosma tenuiflora
- Onosma tornensis
- Onosma tricerosperma
- Onosma troodi
- Onosma visianii
- Onosma waddellii
- Onosma waltonii
- Onosma wardii
- Onosma yajiangense
- Onosma zayueense
