= Anthemis plutonia =

Scientific classification
- Kingdom: Plantae
- Clade: Tracheophytes
- Clade: Angiosperms
- Clade: Eudicots
- Clade: Asterids
- Order: Asterales
- Family: Asteraceae
- Genus: Anthemis
- Species: A. plutonia

Binomial name
- Anthemis plutonia Meikle (1983)

Varieties
- Anthemis plutonia var. artemisioides (Holmboe) Oberpr. & Vogt; Anthemis plutonia var. plutonia

Synonyms
- Anthemis tricolor subsp. plutonia (Meikle) Govaerts (1995)

Species of flowering plant

Anthemis plutonia, the Troödos chamomile, is a species of pilose perennial herb in the sunflower family, Asteraceae found only in Cyprus. It often forms intricate mats with prostrate stems 5–20 cm long. Small bipinnatisect leaves. Capitula 15–20 mm in diameter, with pink rarely creamy-white tubular florets. Suborbicular ray-florets white, rarely pink.

== Habitat ==
Very common in dry igneous hillsides with sparse vegetation, vineyards, roadsides in the Troödos Mountains and Stavrovouni, where it grows from 250 m elevation up to the highest peaks at 1950 m.

== Distribution ==
An endemic of Cyprus where it is restricted to the Troödos range: Stavros Psokas, Prodromos, Khionistra, Kryos Potamos, the Troödos forest, Palekhori, Makheras and Stavrovouni. Flowers March–July.

== Varieties ==
Two varieties are accepted.

- Anthemis plutonia var. artemisioides (Holmboe) Oberpr. & Vogt (synonyms A. artemisioides (Holmboe) Chrtek & B.Slavík and A. tricolor var. artemisioides Holmboe)
- Anthemis plutonia var. plutonia (synonym A. topaliana Beauverd)
