= Sia, Cyprus =

Sia: Σια (Greek); Şa (Turkish)
- Village
- Location in Cyprus
- Coordinates: 34°57′17″N 33°23′24″E
- Country: Cyprus
- District: Nicosia District

Population (2011)
  - Total: 754
- Time zone: UTC+2 (EET)
  - Summer (DST): UTC+3 (EEST)

Sia or Sha (Greek: Σια [locally [ˈʃːa]]; Turkish: Şa) is a village in the Nicosia District of Cyprus. It is located 4 km south of Alampra.
