= Carola Ivena Meikle =

British algologist

Carola Ivena Meikle (née Dickinson) was a British algologist. She was born in 1900 in Alston, Cumberland, and died in 1970 in Wootton Courtenay, Somerset. Meikle was the author of British Seaweeds, published in 1963.

Dickinson was born on 27 April 1900 and for much of her working life studied algae at the herbarium at the Royal Botanical Gardens, Kew. In 1960, Dickinson married Robert Desmond Meikle, a botanist at Kew.

== Published ==
Dickinson, Carol I. 1963. British Seaweeds. The Kew Series.
