= Crocus hartmannianus =

Scientific classification
- Kingdom: Plantae
- Clade: Tracheophytes
- Clade: Angiosperms
- Clade: Monocots
- Order: Asparagales
- Family: Iridaceae
- Genus: Crocus
- Species: C. hartmannianus

Binomial name
- Crocus hartmannianus Holmboe

Species of flowering plant

Crocus hartmannianus is a species of flowering plant in the genus Crocus of the family Iridaceae. It is a cormous perennial native to Cyprus.

Plants inhabit the Troodos Mountains where it is rare, flowering occurs in mid February. Closely related to Crocus cyprius, but differentiated by its coarser paralleled fibered corm tunics.
