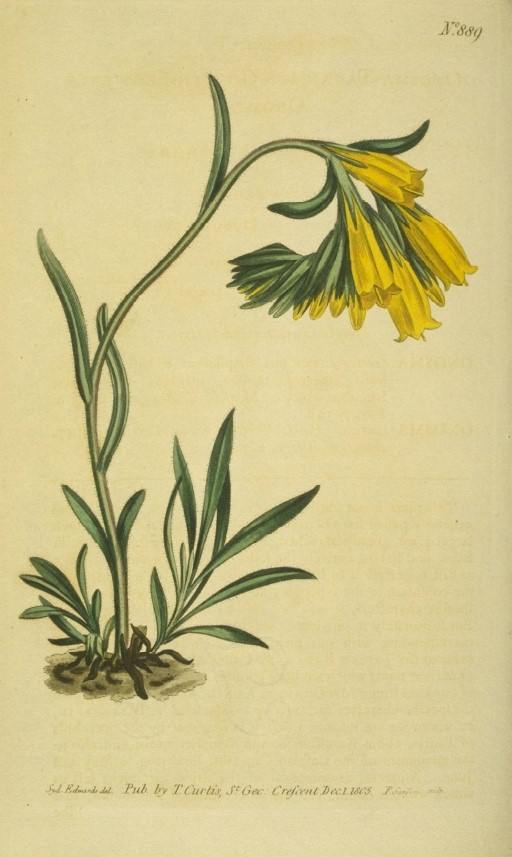

Scientific classification
- Kingdom: Plantae
- Clade: Tracheophytes
- Clade: Angiosperms
- Clade: Eudicots
- Clade: Asterids
- Order: Boraginales
- Family: Boraginaceae
- Genus: Onosma
- Species: O. taurica

Binomial name
- Onosma taurica Pall. ex Willd.

= Onosma taurica =

Golden-flowered onosma

Species of flowering plant

Onosma taurica, the golden-flowered onosma, is a plant native to Europe. It is a perennial herbaceous plant. The leaves are arranged in a rosette at the base of the plant and are often covered in dense hairs, which can give them a silvery or grayish appearance.
