= Onosma stridii =

Scientific classification
- Kingdom: Plantae
- Clade: Embryophytes
- Clade: Tracheophytes
- Clade: Angiosperms
- Clade: Eudicots
- Clade: Asterids
- Order: Boraginales
- Family: Boraginaceae
- Genus: Onosma
- Species: O. stridii

Binomial name
- Onosma stridii Teppner

Species of flowering plant

Onosma stridii is a perennial flowering plant in the family Boraginaceae. It is a Greek endemic species found only at Mt. Kallidromo and Mt. Chlomo. It was named after Swede botanist Arne Strid.
