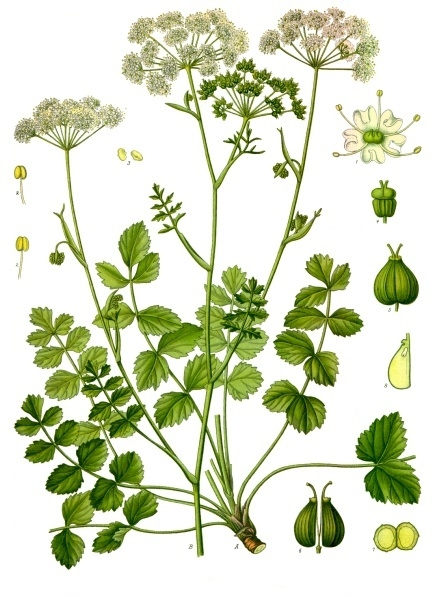
- Pimpinella saxifraga

Scientific classification
- Kingdom: Plantae
- Clade: Tracheophytes
- Clade: Angiosperms
- Clade: Eudicots
- Clade: Asterids
- Order: Apiales
- Family: Apiaceae
- Subfamily: Apioideae
- Tribe: Pimpinelleae
- Genus: Pimpinella; L. (1753) not Ség. (1754) (Rosaceae)

Type species
- Pimpinella saxifraga L.

Synonyms
- Adarianta Knoche; Afrosison H.Wolff; Albovia Schischk.; Anisometros Hassk.; Anisum Hill; Chesneya Bertol., nom. illeg.; Disachoena Zoll. & Moritzi, not validly publ.; Gaytania Münter; Gymnosciadium Hochst.; Heterachaena Zoll. & Moritzi; Ledeburia Link; Murrithia Zoll. & Moritzi; Pancicia Vis.; Pimpinele St.-Lag., orth. var.; Platyrhaphe Miq.; Reutera Boiss.; Tobion Raf.; Tragium Spreng.; Tragolium Raf.; Tragoselinum Mill., nom. superfl.

= Pimpinella =

Genus of flowering plants in the celery family

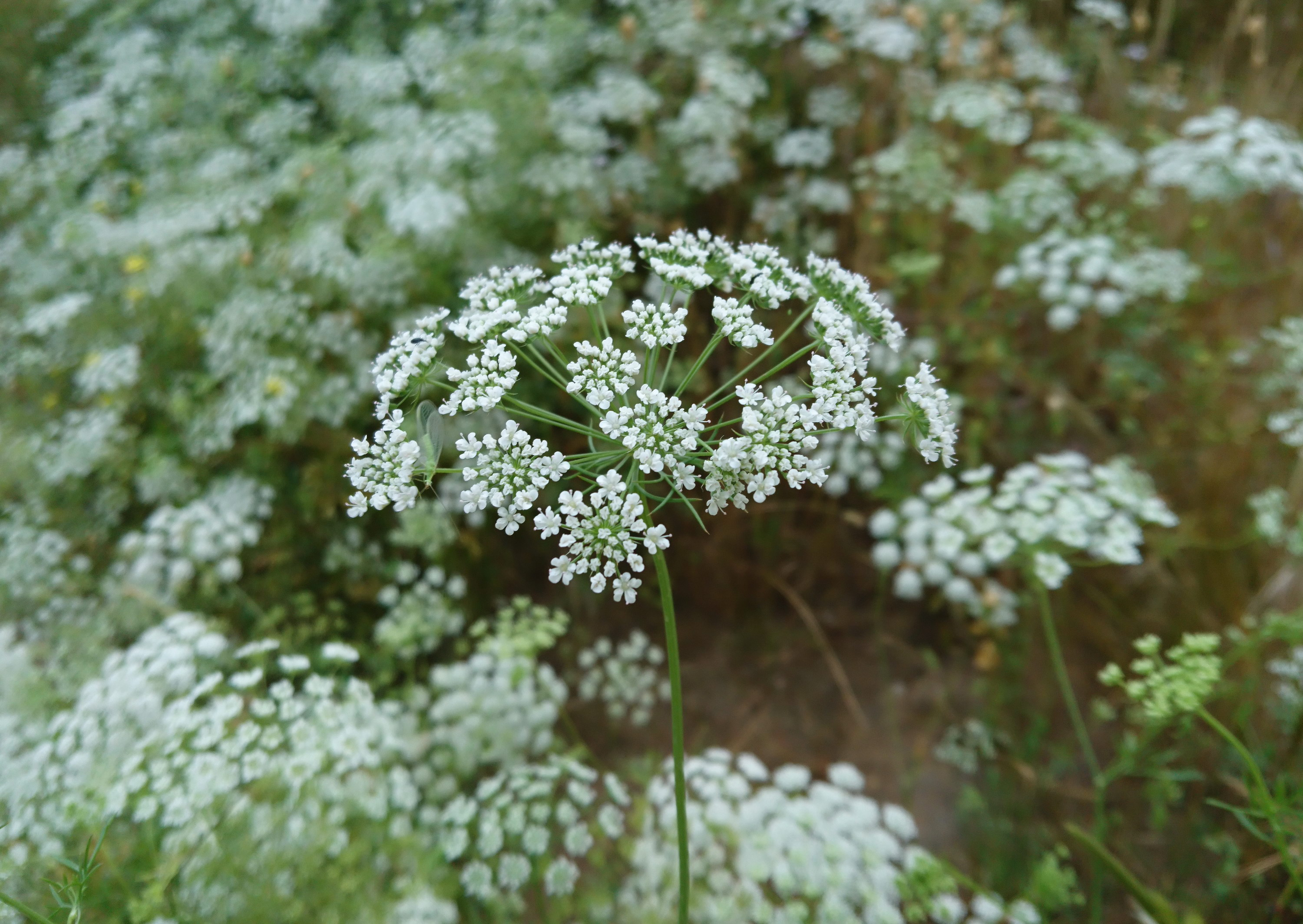
Wild Pimpinella in Behbahan, Iran

Pimpinella is a plant genus in the family Apiaceae; it includes the aromatic herb anise (P. anisum).

== Species ==
As of December 2022, Plants of the World Online accepted the following species:

- Pimpinella acronemastrum Farille & Lachard
- Pimpinella acuminata (Edgew.) C.B.Clarke
- Pimpinella acutidentata C.Norman
- Pimpinella adiyamanensis Yıld. & Kılıç
- Pimpinella adscendens Dalzell
- Pimpinella affinis Ledeb.
- Pimpinella ahmarensis Dawit
- Pimpinella alismatifolia C.C.Towns.
- Pimpinella anagodendron Bolle
- Pimpinella anisactis Rech.f.
- Pimpinella anisetum Boiss. & Balansa
- Pimpinella anisoides V.Brig.
- Pimpinella anisum L.
- Pimpinella aromatica M.Bieb.
- Pimpinella atropurpurea C.Y.Wu ex R.H.Shan & F.T.Pu
- Pimpinella aurea DC.
- Pimpinella barbata (DC.) Boiss.
- Pimpinella battandieri Chabert
- Pimpinella bialata H.Wolff
- Pimpinella bisinuata H.Wolff
- Pimpinella bobrovii (Woronow ex Schischk.) M.Hiroe
- Pimpinella brachyclada Rech.f. & Riedl
- Pimpinella bracteata Haines
- Pimpinella buchananii H.Wolff
- Pimpinella caffra (Eckl. & Zeyh.) D.Dietr.
- Pimpinella camptotricha Penz.
- Pimpinella candolleana Wight & Arn.
- Pimpinella cappadocica Boiss. & Balansa
- Pimpinella caudata (Franch.) H.Wolff
- Pimpinella chungdienensis C.Y.Wu
- Pimpinella cnidioides H.Pearson ex H.Wolff
- Pimpinella coriacea (Franch.) H.Boissieu
- Pimpinella corymbosa Boiss.
- Pimpinella cretica Poir.
- Pimpinella cumbrae Link
- Pimpinella cypria Boiss.
- Pimpinella dendroselinum Webb
- Pimpinella deverroides (Boiss.) Boiss.
- Pimpinella diversifolia DC.
- Pimpinella ebracteata Baker
- Pimpinella enguezekensis Yıldırım, Akalın & Yeşil
- Pimpinella eriocarpa Banks & Sol.
- Pimpinella erythraeae Armari
- Pimpinella etbaica Schweinf.
- Pimpinella fargesii H.Boissieu
- Pimpinella favifolia C.Norman
- Pimpinella filiformis H.Wolff
- Pimpinella filipedicellata S.L.Liou
- Pimpinella flaccida C.B.Clarke
- Pimpinella gilanica Mozaff.
- Pimpinella grisea H.Wolff
- Pimpinella hadacii Engstrand
- Pimpinella hastata C.B.Clarke
- Pimpinella helosciadoidea H.Boissieu
- Pimpinella henryi Diels
- Pimpinella heyneana (DC.) Benth. & Hook.f.
- Pimpinella heywoodii Dawit
- Pimpinella hirtella (Hochst.) A.Rich.
- Pimpinella homblei C.Norman
- Pimpinella huillensis Welw. ex Engl.
- Pimpinella ibradiensis Çinbilgel, Eren, H.Duman & Gökceoğlu
- Pimpinella × intermedia Figert
- Pimpinella inundata (Farille & S.B.Malla) P.K.Mukh. & Constance
- Pimpinella isaurica V.A.Matthews
- Pimpinella javana DC.
- Pimpinella junionae Ceballos & Ortuño
- Pimpinella kaessneri (H.Wolff) Cannon
- Pimpinella kawalekhensis Farille & Lachard
- Pimpinella keniensis C.Norman
- Pimpinella khayyamii Mozaff.
- Pimpinella khorasanica Engstrand
- Pimpinella kingdon-wardii H.Wolff
- Pimpinella koelzii M.Hiroe
- Pimpinella kotschyana Boiss.
- Pimpinella kurdica Rech.f. & Riedl
- Pimpinella kyimbilaensis H.Wolff
- Pimpinella ledermannii H.Wolff
- Pimpinella leschenaultii DC.
- Pimpinella liiana M.Hiroe
- Pimpinella limprichtii H.Wolff
- Pimpinella lindblomii H.Wolff
- Pimpinella lineariloba Cannon
- Pimpinella lutea Desf.
- Pimpinella major (L.) Huds.
- Pimpinella menachensis Schweinf. ex H.Wolff
- Pimpinella mulanjensis C.C.Towns.
- Pimpinella nana Pimenov
- Pimpinella neglecta C.Norman
- Pimpinella nephrophylla Rech.f. & Riedl
- Pimpinella nervosa C.B.Clarke
- Pimpinella niitakayamensis Hayata
- Pimpinella nudicaulis Trautv.
- Pimpinella nyingchiensis Z.H.Pan & K.Yao
- Pimpinella oliverioides Boiss. & Hausskn.
- Pimpinella olivieri Boiss.
- Pimpinella oreophila Hook.f.
- Pimpinella paludosa C.C.Towns.
- Pimpinella parishiana Kurz
- Pimpinella pastinacifolia (Boiss.) H.Wolff
- Pimpinella paucidentata V.A.Matthews
- Pimpinella peregrina L.
- Pimpinella peucedanifolia Fisch. ex Ledeb.
- Pimpinella physotrichioides C.Norman
- Pimpinella pimpinelloides (Hochst.) H.Wolff
- Pimpinella pretenderis Orph. ex Halácsy
- Pimpinella procumbens (Boiss.) Pau
- Pimpinella propinqua H.Wolff
- Pimpinella pruatjan Molk.
- Pimpinella puberula (DC.) Boiss.
- Pimpinella purpurea (Franch.) H.Boissieu
- Pimpinella renifolia H.Wolff
- Pimpinella rhodantha Boiss.
- Pimpinella rhomboidea Diels
- Pimpinella richardsiae C.C.Towns.
- Pimpinella rigidistyla C.C.Towns.
- Pimpinella rigidiuscula C.C.Towns.
- Pimpinella rigidula (Boiss. & Orph.) H.Wolff
- Pimpinella robynsii C.Norman
- Pimpinella rollae Billore & Hemadri
- Pimpinella rubescens (Franch.) H.Wolff ex Hand.-Mazz.
- Pimpinella saxifraga L.
- Pimpinella schimperi Dawit
- Pimpinella schweinfurthii Asch.
- Pimpinella serbica (Vis.) Benth. & Hook.f. ex Drude
- Pimpinella sikkimensis C.B.Clarke
- Pimpinella silvatica Hand.-Mazz.
- Pimpinella silvicola Hemp
- Pimpinella sintenisii H.Wolff
- Pimpinella smithii H.Wolff
- Pimpinella squamosa Karjagin
- Pimpinella stracheyi C.B.Clarke
- Pimpinella × subnigra Tzvelev
- Pimpinella tagawae M.Hiroe
- Pimpinella tenuicaulis Baker
- Pimpinella thellungiana H.Wolff
- Pimpinella tibetanica H.Wolff
- Pimpinella tirupatiensis N.P.Balakr. & Subr.
- Pimpinella tomentosa Dalzell ex C.B.Clarke
- Pimpinella tongloensis P.K.Mukh.
- Pimpinella tragioides (Boiss.) Benth. & Hook.f. ex Drude
- Pimpinella tragium Vill.
- Pimpinella tripartita Kalen.
- Pimpinella triternata Diels
- Pimpinella tunceliana Yıld.
- Pimpinella turcomanica Schischk.
- Pimpinella urbaniana Fedde ex H.Wolff
- Pimpinella urceolata Watt ex Banerji
- Pimpinella valleculosa K.T.Fu
- Pimpinella villosa Schousb.
- Pimpinella wallichiana (Miq.) Gandhi (syn. Pimpinella monoica)
- Pimpinella wallichii C.B.Clarke
- Pimpinella woodii C.C.Towns.
- Pimpinella xizangensis R.H.Shan & F.T.Pu
- Pimpinella yunnanensis (Franch.) H.Wolff
- Pimpinella zagrosica Boiss. & Hausskn.

Former species include:

- Pimpinella brachycarpa → Spuriopimpinella brachycarpa
