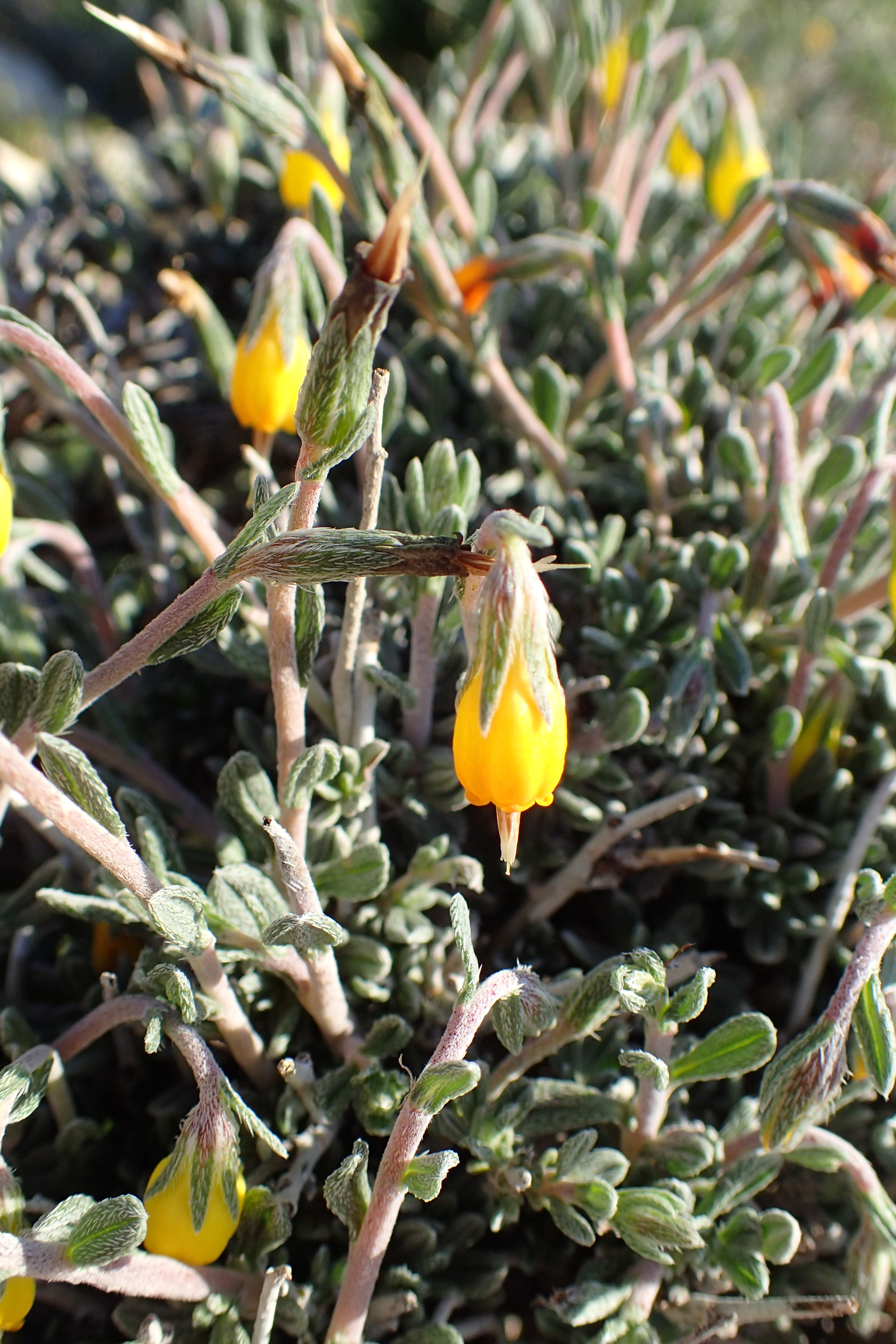
- At Petra tou Romiou, Cyprus

Scientific classification
- Kingdom: Plantae
- Clade: Tracheophytes
- Clade: Angiosperms
- Clade: Eudicots
- Clade: Asterids
- Order: Boraginales
- Family: Boraginaceae
- Genus: Onosma
- Species: O. fruticosa

Binomial name
- Onosma fruticosa Sm.

= Onosma fruticosa =

Shrubby golden-drop

Species of shrub

Onosma fruticosa is an erect, much branched shrub, 30-100 cm high, young shoots covered with bristles. Leaves alternate, simple, entire, stalkless, oblanceolate, 7-20 x 2-5 mm, thick, margins revolute, with a mixture of short hairs and long scabridulous bristles. Flowers tubular, nodding, solitary, corolla golden yellow, turning brownish with age. Flowers February-May. Fruit of 4 nutlets.

== Habitat ==
Dry hillsides with garigue vegetation on limestone and igneous formations at 0-1100 m altitude.

== Distribution ==
Endemic to Cyprus, locally common in many parts of the island: Akamas (Smyies, Ayios Kononas etc.), Neon Khorion, Paphos, the Oritaes forest (Petra tou Romiou), Aphamis, Oroklini, Dhekelia, Akhna, Cape Greco, Protaras, Stavrovouni, Kotchiatis, Athalassa, Potamia, Agrokipia, the Pentadaktylos range, Cape Apostolos Andreas.

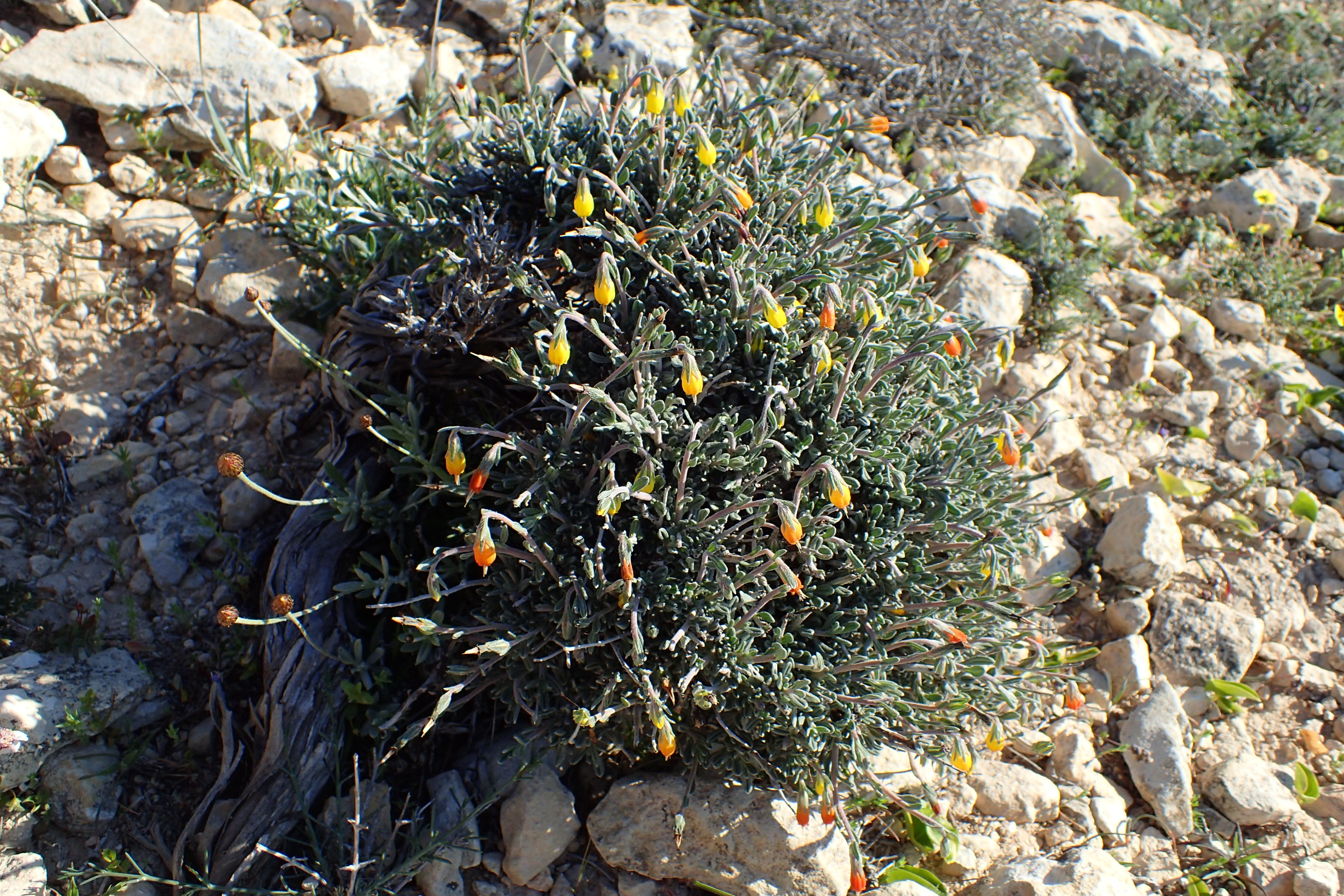
Plant in habitat
