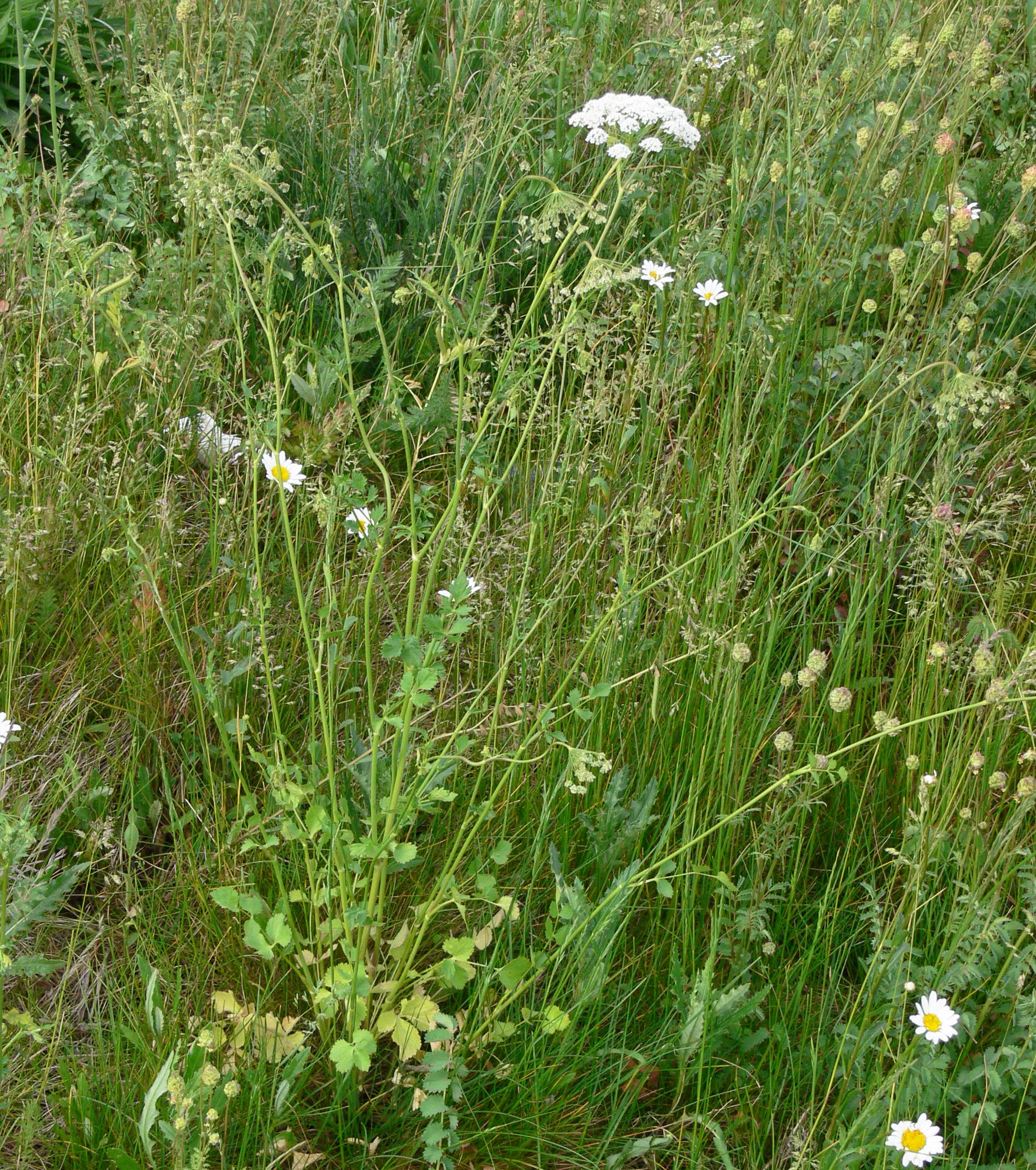

Scientific classification
- Kingdom: Plantae
- Clade: Tracheophytes
- Clade: Angiosperms
- Clade: Eudicots
- Clade: Asterids
- Order: Apiales
- Family: Apiaceae
- Genus: Pimpinella
- Species: P. peregrina

Binomial name
- Pimpinella peregrina L.

Synonyms
- Anisum italicum

= Pimpinella peregrina =

Species of plant

Pimpinella peregrina is a species of biennial herb in the family Apiaceae. They have a self-supporting growth form and simple, broad leaves. Individuals can grow to 0.72 m.

== Sources ==
This article incorporates text from a free content work. Licensed under CC0 (license statement/permission). Text taken from Pimpinella peregrina. Encyclopedia of Life.
