= Onosma troodi =

Scientific classification
- Kingdom: Plantae
- Clade: Embryophytes
- Clade: Tracheophytes
- Clade: Spermatophytes
- Clade: Angiosperms
- Clade: Eudicots
- Clade: Asterids
- Order: Boraginales
- Family: Boraginaceae
- Genus: Onosma
- Species: O. troodi

Binomial name
- Onosma troodi Kotschy

Species of flowering plant

Onosma troodi is a species of flowering plant in the family Boraginaceae, native to Cyprus. It is typically found growing on ultramafic soils.
