= Allium exaltatum =

Scientific classification
- Kingdom: Plantae
- Clade: Tracheophytes
- Clade: Angiosperms
- Clade: Monocots
- Order: Asparagales
- Family: Amaryllidaceae
- Subfamily: Allioideae
- Genus: Allium
- Section: Codonoprasum
- Species: A. exaltatum

Binomial name
- Allium exaltatum (Meikle) Brullo, Pavone, Salmeri & Venora (2004)

Synonyms
- Allium paniculatum subsp. exaltatum Meikle (1983)

Species of flowering plant

Allium exaltatum is a species of flowering plant in the onion genus, Allium. It is a bulbous geophyte endemic to Cyprus.

== Taxonomy ==
Allium exaltatum was first described by Robert Desmond Meikle in 1983 as a subspecies of Allium paniculatum (as A. paniculatum subsp. exaltatum). The holotype specimen (the single specimen designated as the type for the species) was collected at Xerokolymbos, southwest of Khionistra in Cyprus, at an elevation of 4,930 feet on 25 July 1937, by a collector named Kennedy (specimen number 181), and is housed at the Royal Botanic Gardens, Kew (K). Following comprehensive cytotaxonomic investigations by Brullo, Pavone, Salmeri, and Venora in 2004, it was elevated to full species status. This taxonomic reclassification was based on its distinct morphological features, chromosome characteristics, and geographic isolation. The species belongs to the genus Allium within the family Alliaceae (onion family). More specifically, it is classified within Allium section Codonoprasum, a taxonomic group characterized by particular floral and vegetative traits.

== Description ==
Allium exaltatum grows from an ovoid bulb measuring 1.3–2 cm long and 0.8–1.2 cm wide, with brownish outer layers and transparent inner layers. Its slender, upright stem reaches 20–50 cm in height, with the lower third to half covered by leaf sheaths. The plant typically has four smooth, hollow, semicylindrical leaves that can grow up to 35 cm long and 2–2.5 mm wide.

The flowering structure (inflorescence) is hemispheric and relatively compact, containing 15–40 flowers and measuring 1.3–2.8 cm in diameter. Two unequal protective bracts (spathe valves) surround the inflorescence; the larger one measures 15–30 mm long with seven veins, while the smaller one is 12–15 mm long with three to five veins. The flower stalks (pedicels) are of about equal length, measuring 7–12 mm.

The flowers have a bell-shaped form with yellowish-white petals (tepals) tinged with purplish-brown. These petals are oblong-elliptical with rounded tips, measuring 5–5.5 mm long and 2.4–2.8 mm wide. The stamens are either equal in length to the petals or slightly longer, with simple white filaments and straw-coloured, elliptical anthers that have a small point at the tip. The green, slightly wrinkled ovary develops into a three-valved, nearly spherical seed capsule.

Genetically, Allium exaltatum is hexaploid, meaning it has six sets of chromosomes (2n=48), which is unusual within its taxonomic section. Research suggests it likely originated through allopolyploidy—a process where hybridization between species is followed by chromosome doubling. The plant's leaf cross-section reveals a semicylindrical structure with scattered ribs, a well-developed protective outer layer (cuticle), and breathing pores (stomata) distributed across the entire surface.
