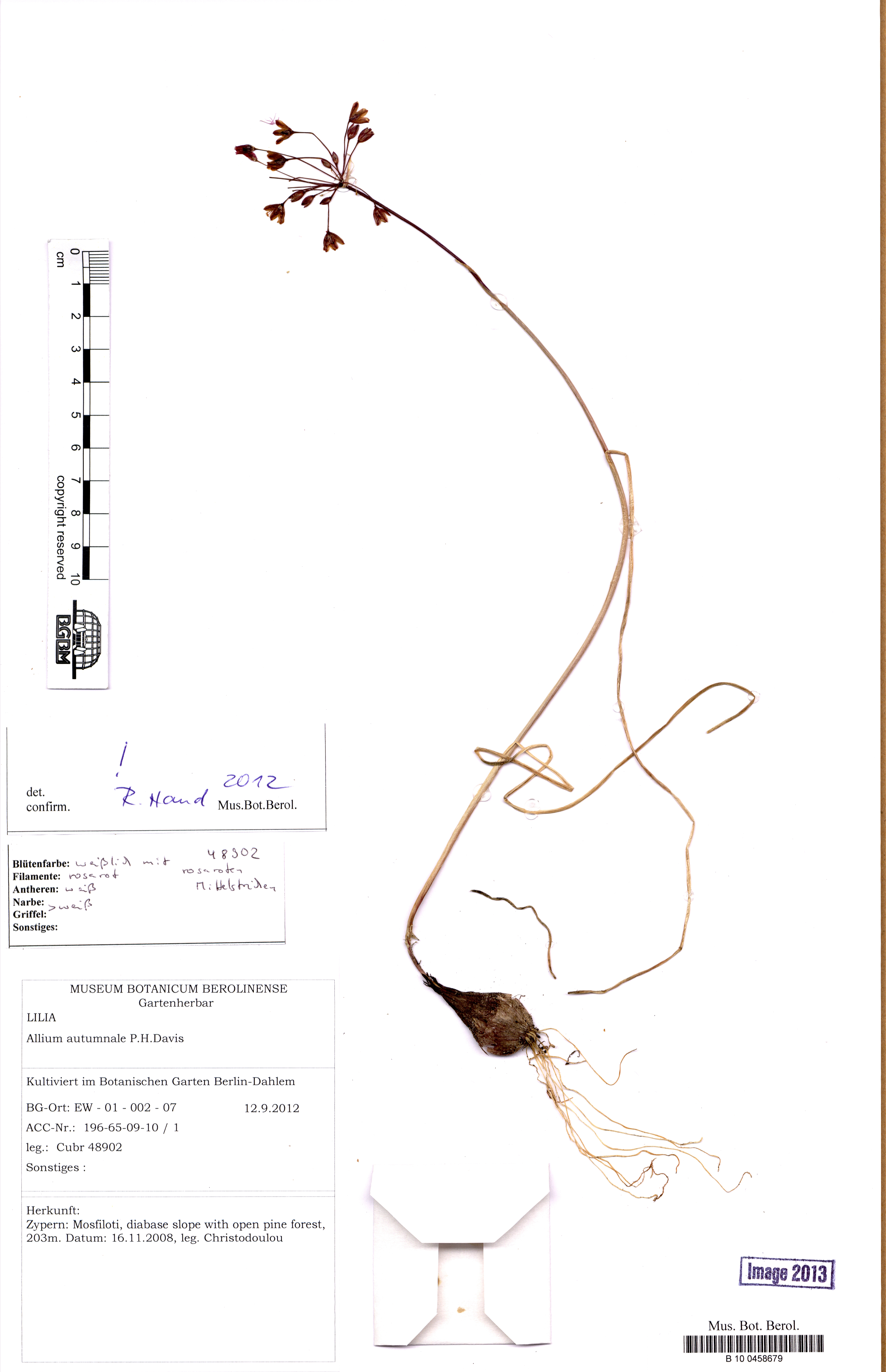

Conservation status
- Least Concern (IUCN 3.1)

Scientific classification
- Kingdom: Plantae
- Clade: Tracheophytes
- Clade: Angiosperms
- Clade: Monocots
- Order: Asparagales
- Family: Amaryllidaceae
- Subfamily: Allioideae
- Genus: Allium
- Species: A. autumnale

Binomial name
- Allium autumnale P.H.Davis

= Allium autumnale =

Endemic plant of Cyprus

Allium autumnale is a species of monocot plant in the Amaryllidaceae family endemic to the island of Cyprus.

== Habitat ==
Allium autumnale has been found in the Troodos mountains and the northern coastal belt of Cyprus. This puts a bound on the elevation it grows, between 100 and 1,380 m (330 and 4,530 ft). It grows predominantly in pine litter, on garrigue, on limestone, sandstone or igneous hillsides, and sometimes in vineyards or hedgerows.
