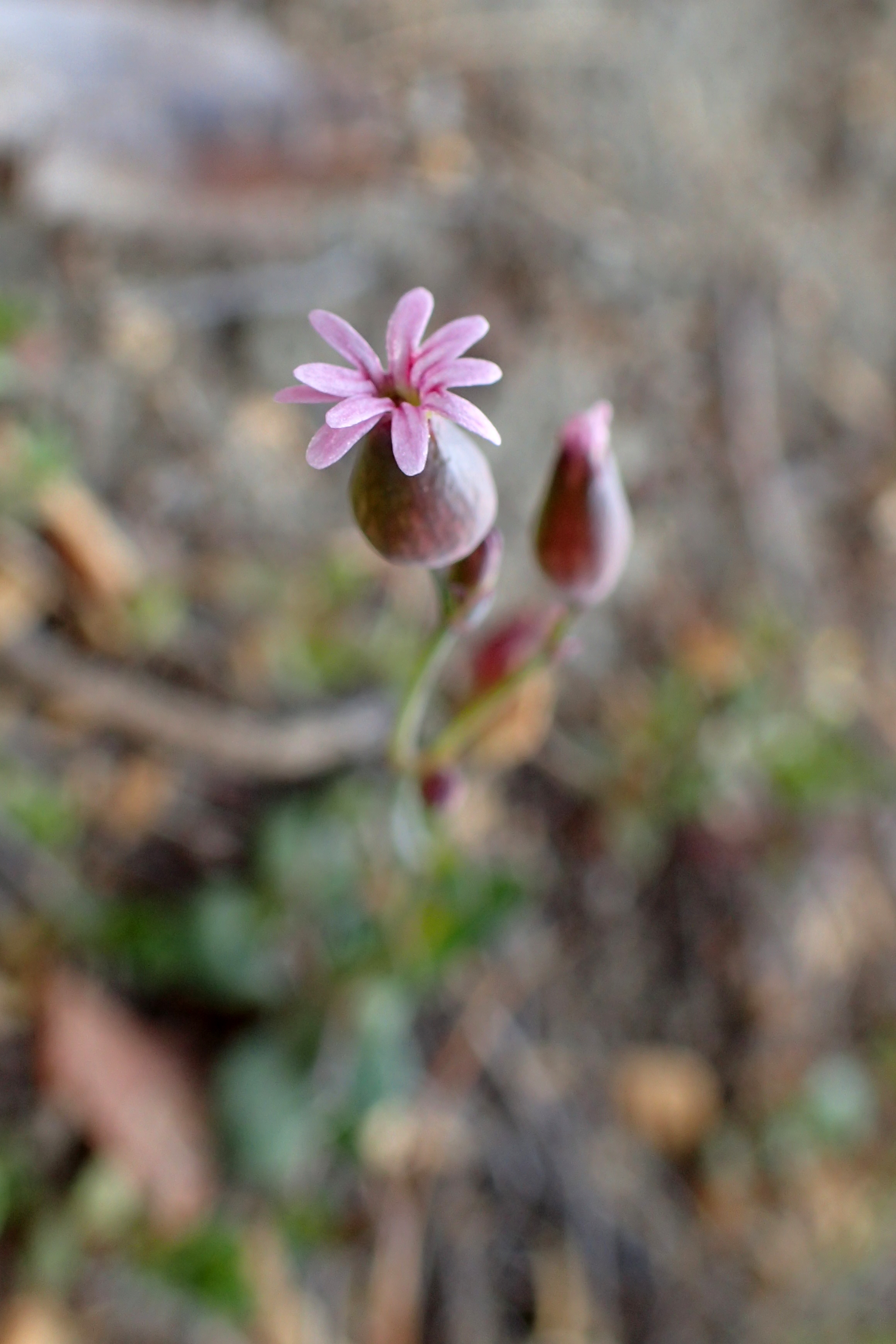
- Silene laevigata flower

Scientific classification
- Kingdom: Plantae
- Clade: Tracheophytes
- Clade: Angiosperms
- Clade: Eudicots
- Order: Caryophyllales
- Family: Caryophyllaceae
- Genus: Silene
- Species: S. laevigata

Binomial name
- Silene laevigata Sm.

= Silene laevigata =

Species of flowering plant

Silene laevigata, the Troödos catchfly, is a glaucous, erect or decumbent annual plant. It grows 6–27 cm (2.4–10.6 in) high with glabrous stems and small leaves. It has pink flowers, and the petals bifid 9–10 mm (0.35–0.39 in) long. It flowers in March–June.

== Habitat ==
Pine forest, roadsides and garrigue on dry igneous mountainsides at 650–1,950 m (2,130–6,400 ft) altitude.

== Distribution ==
Endemic to Cyprus, locally common on the Troödos range.
