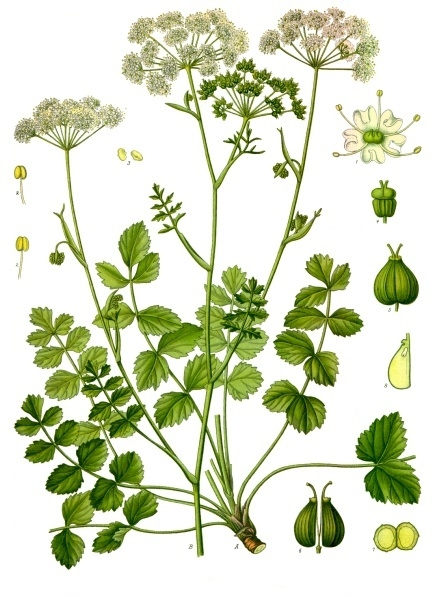

Scientific classification
- Kingdom: Plantae
- Clade: Tracheophytes
- Clade: Angiosperms
- Clade: Eudicots
- Clade: Asterids
- Order: Apiales
- Family: Apiaceae
- Genus: Pimpinella
- Species: P. saxifraga

Binomial name
- Pimpinella saxifraga L.

= Pimpinella saxifraga =

Burnet-saxifrage

Species of flowering plant

Pimpinella saxifraga, known as burnet-saxifrage, solidstem burnet saxifrage, lesser burnet is a plant species in the family Apiaceae, a native of the British Isles and temperate Europe and Western Asia. It is neither a burnet, which its leaves resemble, nor a saxifrage although it has a similar herbal effect as a diuretic.

The plant makes up a large part of the turf in some of southern England's chalk downs. It is highly nutritious for sheep and cattle, and in the past was cultivated on calcareous soils for fodder.

John Gerard's Herball (1597) commends the plant's properties, and states that it is: "A speciall helpe to defend the heart from noysome vapours and from the infection of the Plague or Pestilence, and all other contagious diseases for which purpose it is of great effect, the juice thereof being taken in some drink...it is a capital wound herb for all sorts of wounds, both of the head and body, either inward or outward, used either in juice or decoction of the herb, or by the powder of the herb or root..."
