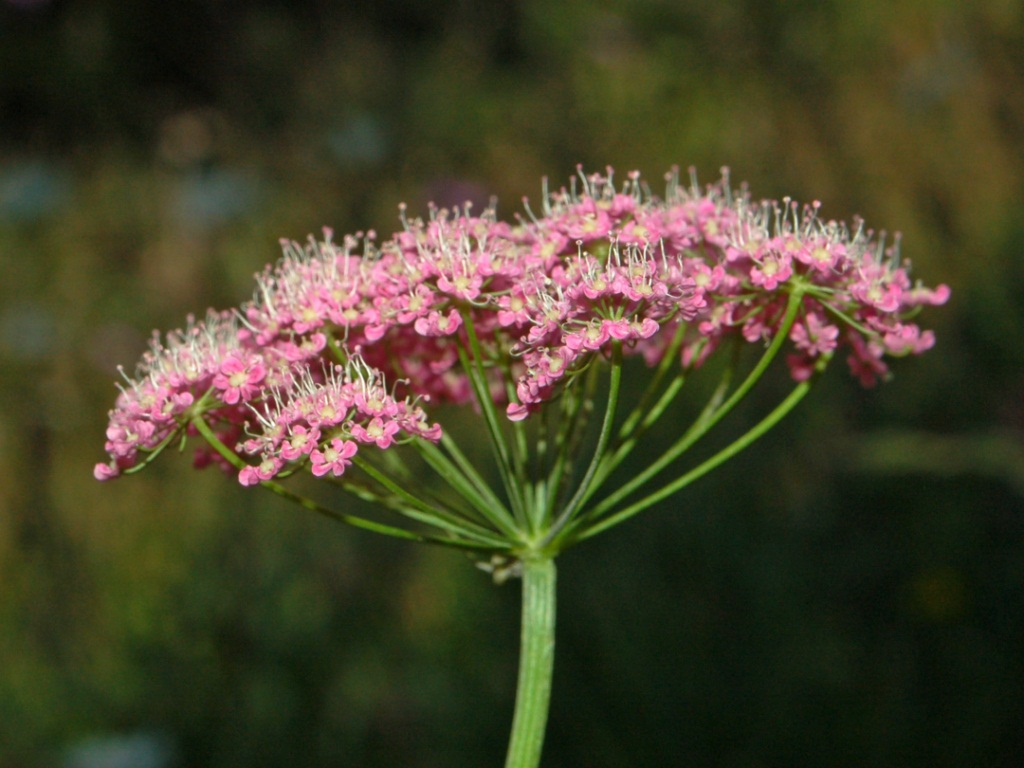
- Inflorescence of Pimpinella major, lateral view

Scientific classification
- Kingdom: Plantae
- Clade: Tracheophytes
- Clade: Angiosperms
- Clade: Eudicots
- Clade: Asterids
- Order: Apiales
- Family: Apiaceae
- Genus: Pimpinella
- Species: P. major

Binomial name
- Pimpinella major (L.) Huds.

Synonyms
- Pimpinella magna L., Pimpinella saxifraga L. var. major L.; Pimpinella major subsp. sambucifolia S.E. Fröhner

= Pimpinella major =

Species of flowering plant

Pimpinella major, common name greater burnet-saxifrage or hollowstem burnet saxifrage, is a herbaceous perennial plant in the genus Pimpinella belonging to the carrot family (Apiaceae).

== Description ==
Pimpinella major reaches on average 30–100 cm (10–40 in) in height. The stem is hollow, deeply grooved, mostly glabrous, and generally branched and leafy.

The leaves are dark green, slightly glossy, ovate or oblong, short-stalked, feathery, more or less deeply cut, and usually pointed. Basal leaves have a petiole 20–60 cm (8–20 in) long.

The inflorescence has a diameter of 50–60 mm (2.0–2.4 in). The flowers, usually hermaphrodite, range from white to glowing rose or soft-pink and are gathered in umbels with 11 to 16 stalks.

The flowering period extends from June to August in its native habitat. The fruits are ovoid, 2–3 mm (0.08–0.1 in) long.

== Subspecies ==
- Pimpinella major (L.) Huds. var. rubra Hoppe. ex Mérat

Also known as big red burnet, it is characterized by low growth and intense rose-colored petals. The stem is usually branched at the base, the branches are short and generally carry only one umbel.

- Pimpinella major var. rosea Lindeman
- Pimpinella major var. macrodonta (Pau) O. Bolòs & Vigo
- Pimpinella major var. orientalis (Gouam) Fi. et Paol.
- Pimpinella major var. dissecta (Sprengel) Fi. et Paol.
- Pimpinella major var. bipinnata G. Beck

== Distribution ==
Pimpinella major is widespread in central Europe and in the Caucasus and it is naturalized in North America.

== Habitat ==
It grows in burned forests, clearings, herb-rich areas, meadows, waysides, and wooded pastures. It prefers nutrient-rich substrate and chalk and limestone soils, at an altitude of 0–2,300 m (0–7,546 ft) above sea level.

== Uses ==
The roots of Pimpinella major have been used internally in Austrian traditional medicine - as a tisane, in milk, or in herbal liqueurs - for the treatment of disorders of the respiratory tract, fever, infections, colds, and influenza.

== Gallery ==
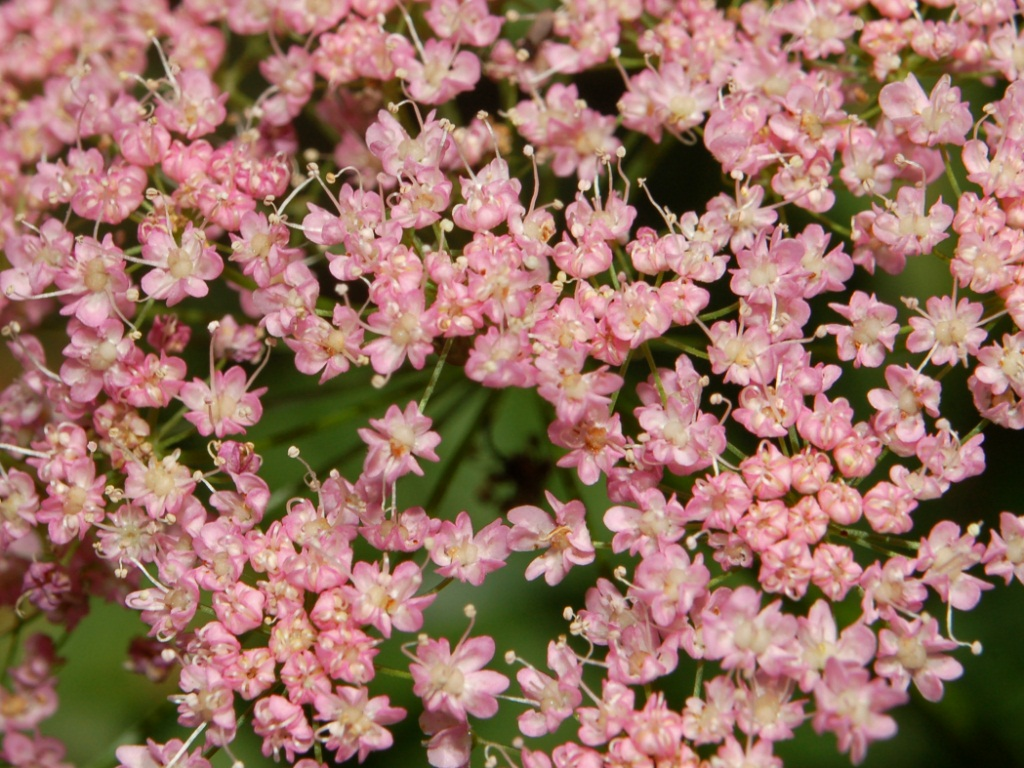
Close-up of flowers of P. major

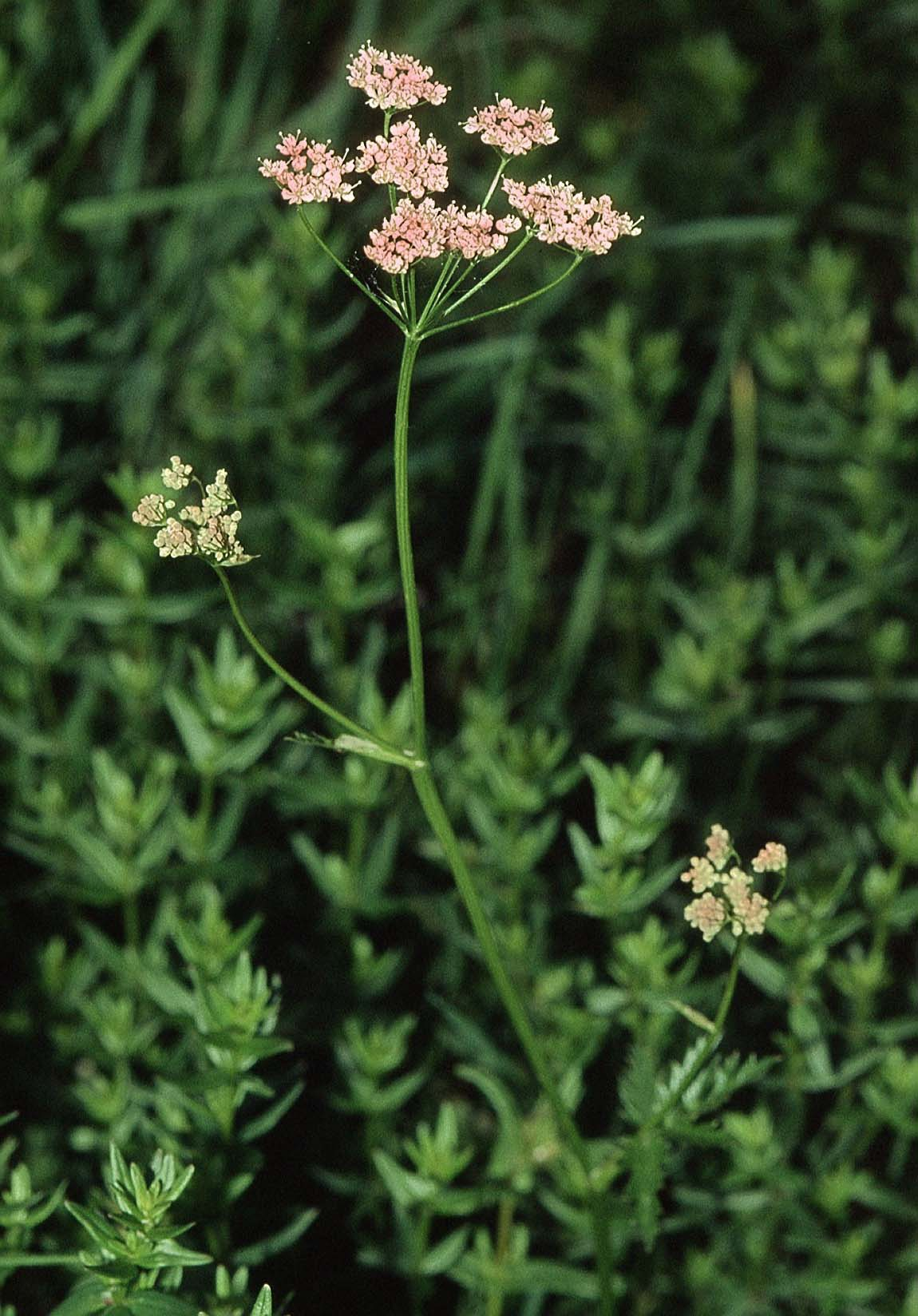
Plant of Pimpinella major ssp. rubra

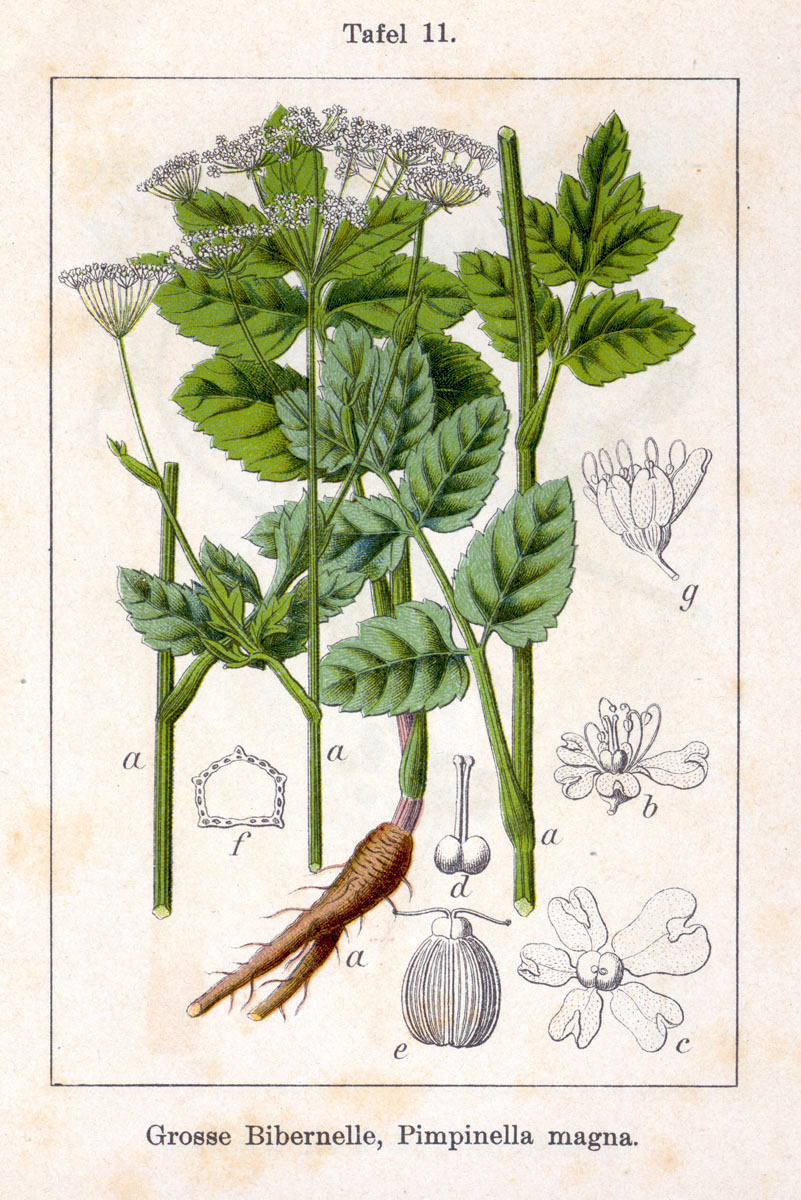
Figure from Deutschlands Flora in Abbildungen, 1796

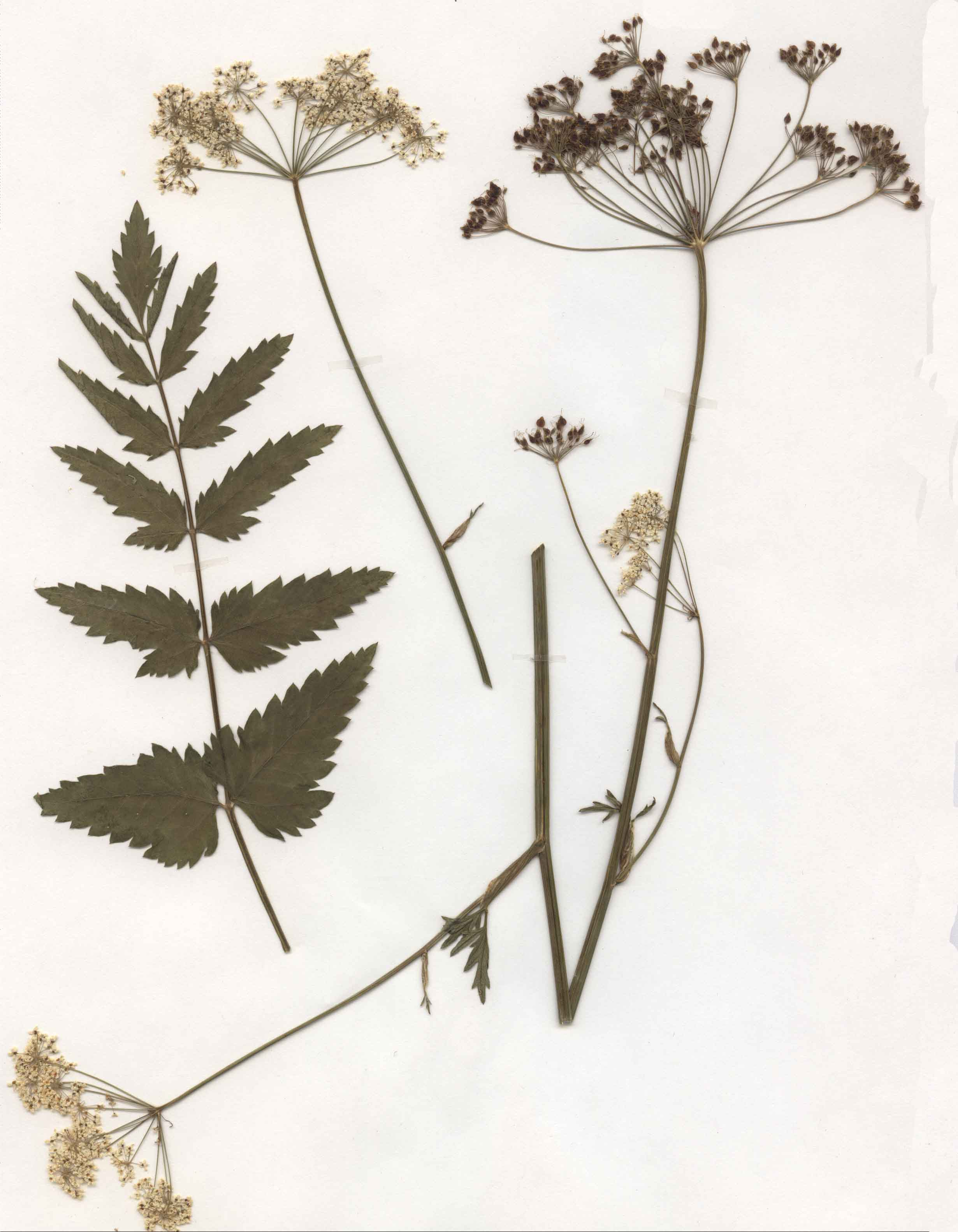
P. major from a herbarium

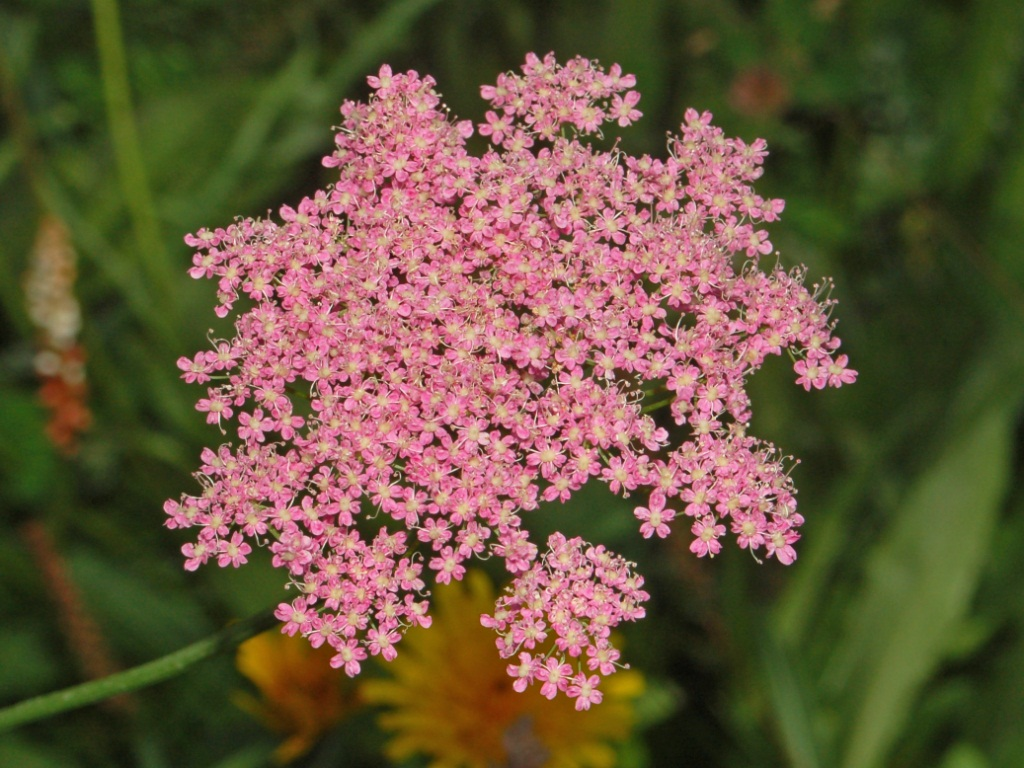
Close-up of inflorescence of P. major

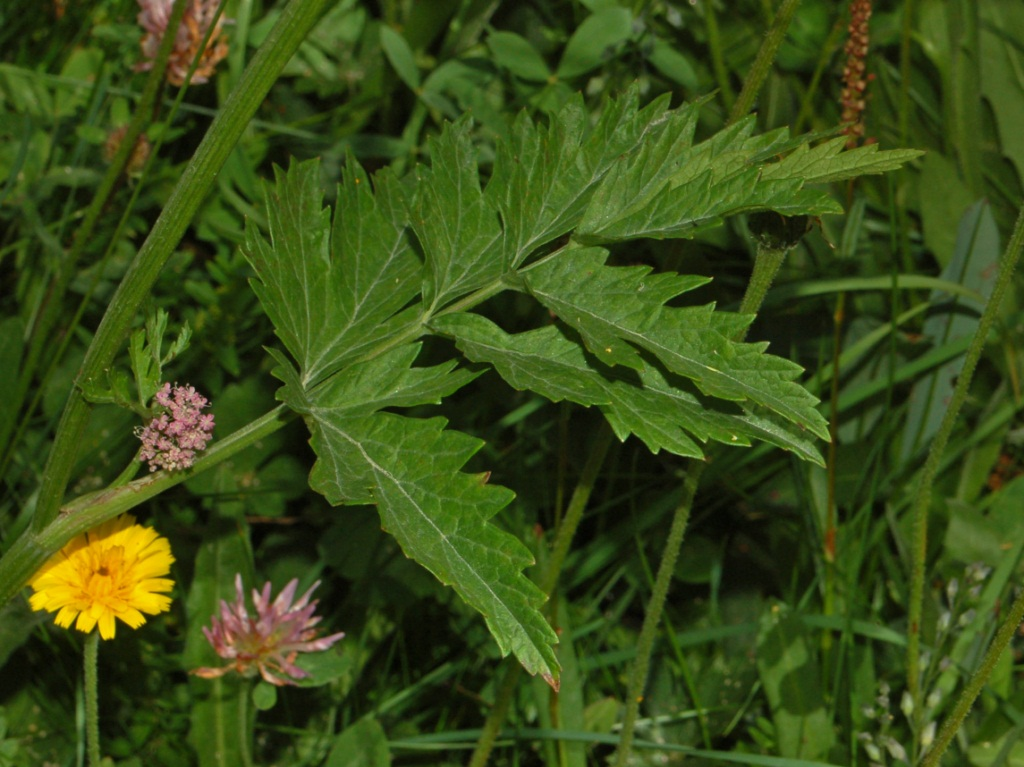
Leaves of P. major
