= Alampra =

Alampra: Αλάμπρα (Greek); Alampra (Turkish)
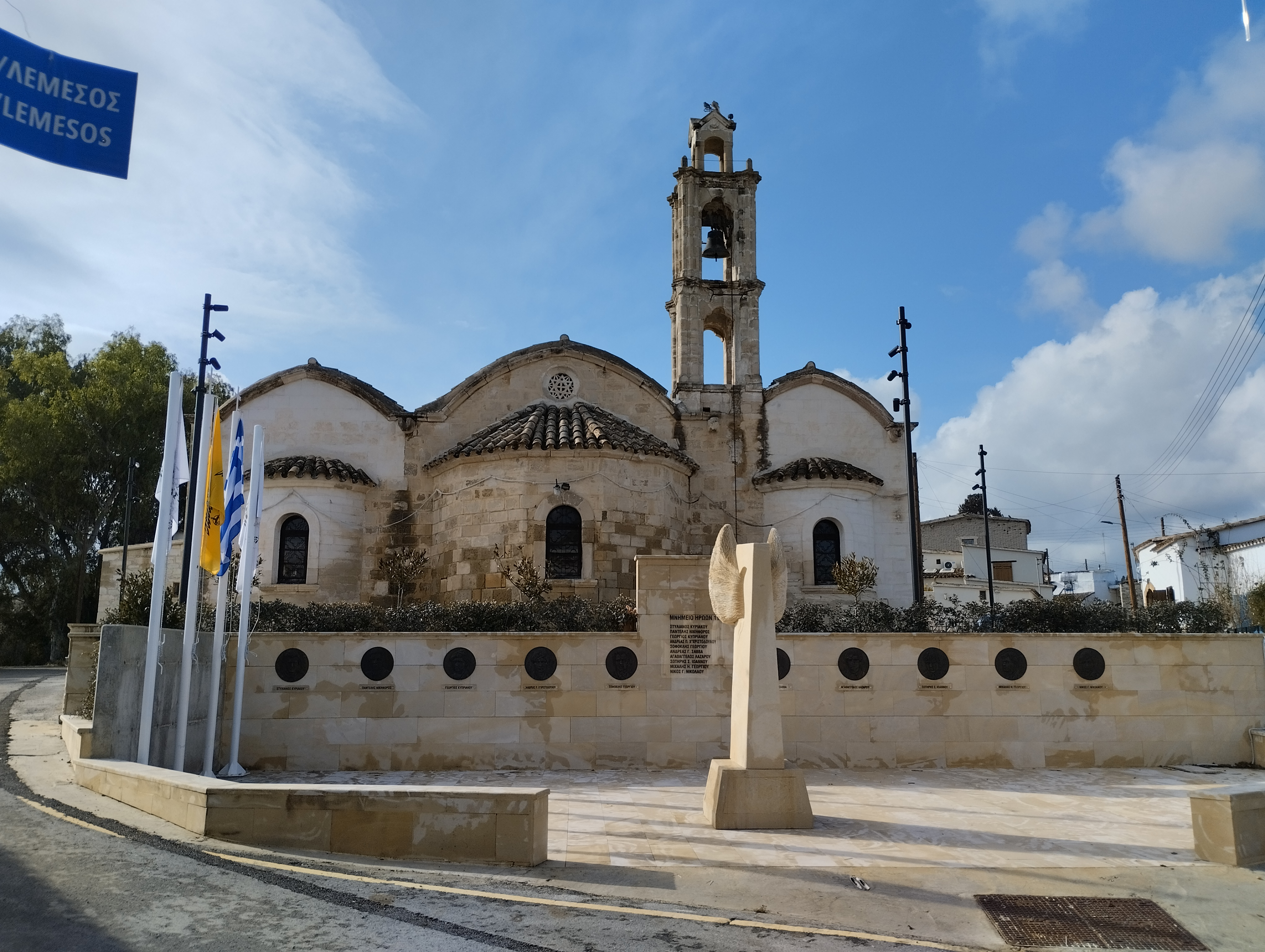
- Agia Marina church and the Turkish invasion memorial in Alampra.

- Location in Cyprus
- Coordinates: 34°59′22″N 33°23′56″E
- Country: Cyprus
- District: Nicosia District

Population (2001)
  - Total: 1,140
- Time zone: UTC+2 (EET)
  - Summer (DST): UTC+3 (EEST)

Alampra or Alambra (Greek: Αλάμπρα; Turkish: Alampra) is a village located in the Nicosia District of Cyprus.

Excavations took place here between 1974 and 1985, where the remains of a Middle Bronze Age (ca. 1900-1650 BC) settlement were found. Several residential buildings, rectangular houses with several rooms were found. They are considered among the earliest rectangular buildings in Cyprus. Cattle, deer, pig and goat bones and ceramics were also found which were important to clarify the development of Bronze Age pottery in Cyprus. Ceramic figurines and copper objects were also found, but no signs of copper processing.

The name of the village was first recorded in the 5th century BC Idalion Tablet, where the doctor Onasilos was given a plot of land in that area in exchange for his medical services during an invasion against the city of Idalion by the joint forces of Kition and the Persians.

Following local government reform in 2024, Alamprawas merged into the new municipality of South Nicosia-Idalion.
