= Pimpinella cypria =

Scientific classification
- Kingdom: Plantae
- Clade: Tracheophytes
- Clade: Angiosperms
- Clade: Eudicots
- Clade: Asterids
- Order: Apiales
- Family: Apiaceae
- Genus: Pimpinella
- Species: P. cypria

Binomial name
- Pimpinella cypria Boiss.

Species of plant in the celery family

Pimpinella cypria, common name Cyprus burnet-saxifrage and locally Kıbrıs Pimpinela, is a herbaceous perennial plant belonging to the family Apiaceae. This rare endemic species is characterized by its white umbellate flowers and distinctive compound leaves with broad leaflets. It grows in the limestone crevices of the Kyrenia Range in northern Cyprus, where it has adapted to the Mediterranean climate with specialized features to withstand seasonal drought and rocky terrain.

== Description ==
Pimpinella cypria is a herbaceous perennial in the carrot family (Apiaceae), arising from a stout, woody rootstock enveloped by the dried sheaths of previous seasons' leaves. From this base emerge erect, prominently ridged stems that typically reach 60–70 cm (24–28 in) in height and are clothed in soft, spreading hairs. Branching is minimal below the flower clusters (inflorescence), allowing the plant to maintain a clear, upright form, and the dense hairs—especially along the main leaf veins—likely help to reduce water loss and deter herbivores.

Each basal leaf is divided into typically five broad leaflets (sometimes only three), though some leaves may appear fan-shaped and undivided. These leaflets measure up to 4 cm long by 3 cm wide and bear a fine covering of hairs—sparser on the upper surface and denser beneath—which accentuates their net-like veins. The margins of each leaflet are gently toothed and irregularly lobed, with the terminal leaflet often deeply three-lobed. Petioles may extend up to 12 cm (4.7 in), gently channeling rainwater towards the stem. Higher up, leaves become fewer and narrower—sometimes reduced to two slender segments—while retaining a similar soft indumentum.

Flowering in spring (April to May), P. cypria bears its blooms in terminal umbels (a flower cluster whose stalks radiate from a single point, much like the ribs of an umbrella) arranged in loose, branching panicles of six to fourteen rays; each ray is 2–9 cm (0.8–3.5 in) long and lightly bristly. The small flowers have dirty-white petals about 1 mm long with two unequal lobes. Following flowering, the plant produces narrowly ovoid fruits roughly 4 mm long and 2.5 mm wide; each one-seeded segment (mericarp) is flattened side to side, clothed in fine white hairs and marked by five slender longitudinal ridges.

The diploid chromosome number of Pimpinella cypria has been determined as 2n = 20.

== Habitat & distribution ==
Pimpinella cypria grows in limestone fissures in many north-facing shady spots. As an endemic of northern Cyprus, P. cypria is confined to rocky, north-facing slopes of the Kyrenia Range from Kornos to Yaila and near Eptakomi. It is particularly common around Saint Hilarion Castle at elevations of 750–820 m (2,460–2,690 ft)—where it favours sunny yet sheltered limestone ledges.
