= Taraxacum holmboei =

Scientific classification
- Kingdom: Plantae
- Clade: Tracheophytes
- Clade: Angiosperms
- Clade: Eudicots
- Clade: Asterids
- Order: Asterales
- Family: Asteraceae
- Genus: Taraxacum
- Species: T. holmboei

Binomial name
- Taraxacum holmboei H.Lindb.
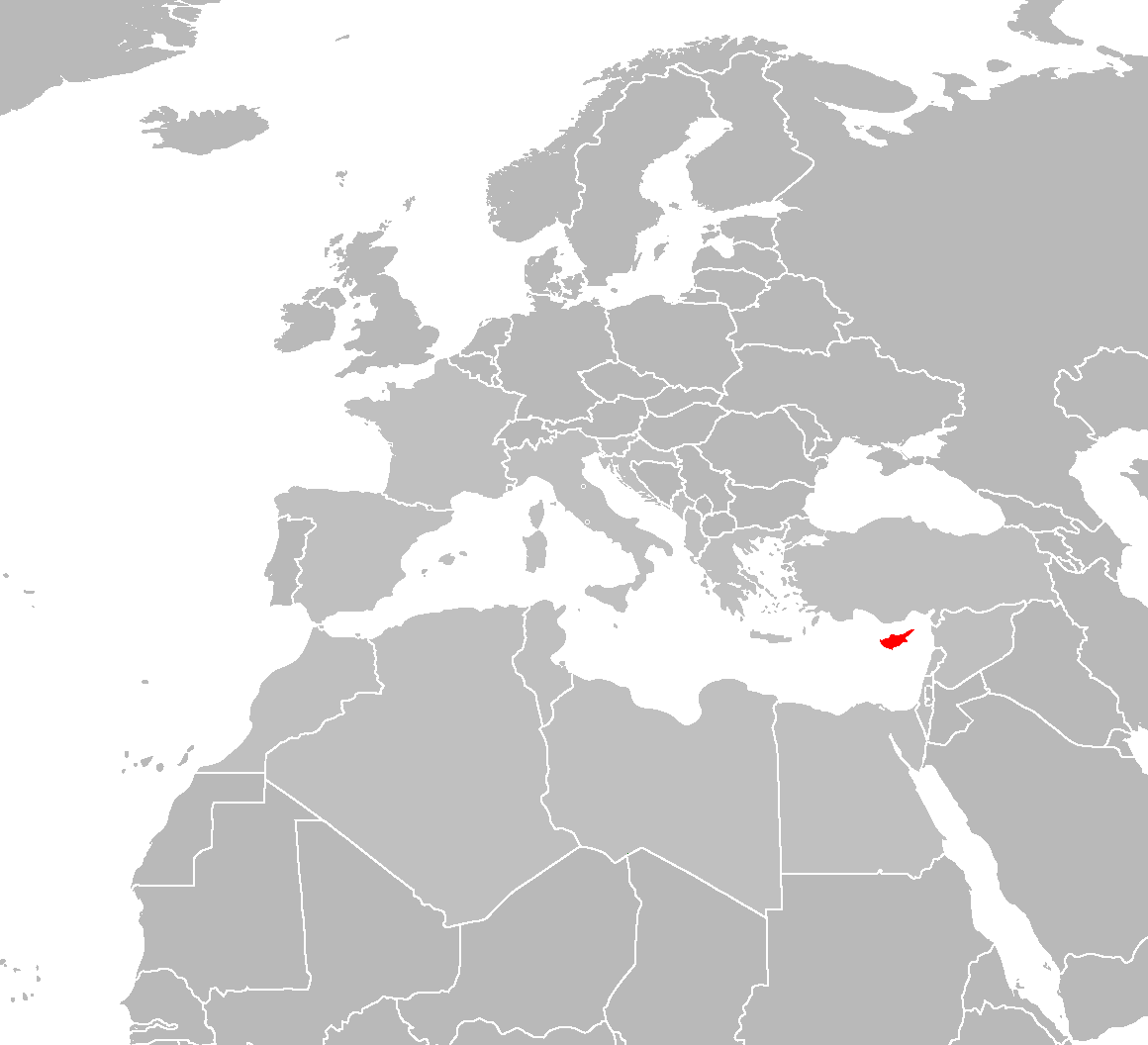
- Taraxacum holmboei is endemic to Cyprus

Species of flowering plant

Taraxacum holmboei, the Troödos dandelion, is a rosulate perennial herb, up to 10 cm high. Leaves simple, all in rosette, deeply divided (pinnatifid), with deltoid-acute lobes, glabrous, oblong in outline, 3.5-10 x 8-2.5 cm. Flowers in capitula, with yellow, ligulate florets, flowering May–June (hysteranthous, flowers appearing after leaf development). Fruit a pappose achene.

== Habitat ==
Open pine forests, roadsides, dry hillsides with open vegetation on igneous rocks at 1100–1950 m altitude.

== Distribution ==
Endemic to Cyprus where it is confined to the Troödos Mountains where it is locally common: Platania, Karvounas, Troodos Square, Almyrolivadho, Khionistra and Prodromos.

== Etymology ==
It is named in honour of the Norwegian botanist Jens Holmboe (1880 – 1943).

== Cytology ==
The diploid chromosome count is 2n = 12.

== Conservation ==
It is categorized as vulnerable (VU) by The Red Data Book of the flora of Cyprus.
