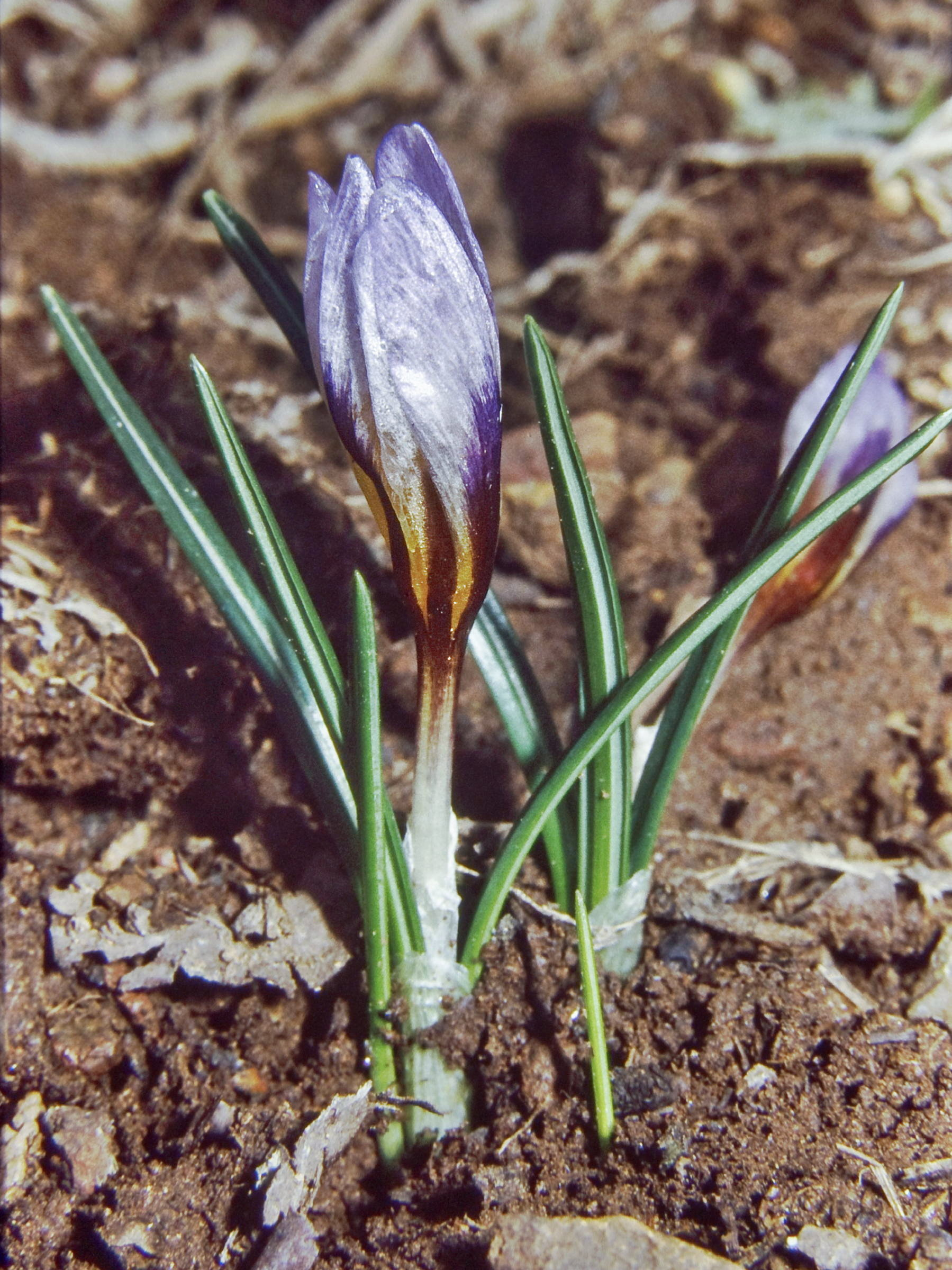
- In habitat, Troodos Mountains, Cyprus

Conservation status
- Vulnerable (IUCN 3.1)

Scientific classification
- Kingdom: Plantae
- Clade: Tracheophytes
- Clade: Angiosperms
- Clade: Monocots
- Order: Asparagales
- Family: Iridaceae
- Genus: Crocus
- Species: C. cyprius

Binomial name
- Crocus cyprius Boiss. & Kotschy

Synonyms
- Crocus aerius var. cyprius (Boiss. & Kotschy) Baker; Crocus cambessedesii Klatt

= Crocus cyprius =

Species of flowering plant

Crocus cyprius is a species of flowering plant in the genus Crocus of the family Iridaceae. It is a cormous perennial native to Cyprus where it is found in the Troödos Mountains.

Plants flower from January to April and are found inhabiting areas with stony soils. The corm tunic is annulate (having rings) and papery.

Whole plant

Closeup of flower
