= Potamia, Cyprus =

Potamia: Ποταμιά (Greek); Potamya (Turkish)
- Location in Cyprus
- Coordinates: 35°2′31″N 33°26′42″E
- Country: Cyprus
- District: Nicosia District

Population (2001)
  - Total: 415
- Time zone: UTC+2 (EET)
  - Summer (DST): UTC+3 (EEST)

Potamia (Greek: Ποταμιά; Turkish: Potamya, Bodamya and Dereliköy) is a village in the north-east of Cyprus in the district of Nicosia, close to the Green Line separating it from the largely unrecognised Turkish Republic of Northern Cyprus. Together with Pyla and Rizokarpaso, Potamia is one of the few remaining ethnically mixed communities in Cyprus, made up of Greek and Turkish Cypriots.

== History ==
The remains of the royal residence of King Peter II (1369–1382), destroyed by the Saracens in 1426, are in Potamia. When the site was visited by Rupert Gunnis in 1936, only a portion of the walls, a large vaulted room with fragments of frescoes, remained.

Prior to the inter-communal conflict, Greek junta coup and the Turkish invasion of Cyprus of 1974 the village had a Turkish-Cypriot majority. However, most Turkish Cypriots have subsequently emigrated to Northern Cyprus, and now the village is mostly inhabited by the remaining Greek Cypriots. Nonetheless, the village has a history of co-existence between the two communities, and Greek and Turkish Cypriots still live side by side. Recently there has been some lobbying to convince Turkish Cypriots to return, and some have done so.

== Culture ==
There is widespread bilingualism and cooperation between the Greek Cypriot and Turkish Cypriot communities, and the village has both a Greek Cypriot and a Turkish Cypriot mayor who work together. In line with the bi-communal character of the village, it is the home of Radio Potamia, an FM radio station that broadcasts equally in Greek and Turkish. These broadcasts reach both northern and southern Cyprus, with the stated aim of promoting mutual understanding and respect between the communities.

== Royal palace ==
Potamia was a royal residence of the Lusignan Dynasty and was inhabited by the Queen of Cyprus, Catherine Cornaro. The village which is near of the capital of Cyprus, Nicosia is the place of a palace of the kings of Cyprus, which is still standing. In October 2011, the Cyprus Antiquities Department announced Caterina Cornaro's partially ruined summer palace in Potamia would be renovated in a one million euro restoration project, becoming a cultural centre. As of 2017 the palace is still in a state of decay. Looting is known to take place.

== Local Government Reform ==
Following local government reform in 2024, Potamia was merged into the new municipality of South Nicosia-Idalion.
