= Robert Desmond Meikle =

British botanist (1923–2021)

Robert Desmond Meikle OBE (18 May 1923 – 8 February 2021) was a British botanist from the Royal Botanic Gardens, Kew.

== Life and career ==
Meikle was born in May 1923 in Newtownards, County Down, Northern Ireland.

He became most notable for his two-volume work Flora of Cyprus (1977 and 1985), the first comprehensive contribution about the almost 1750 plant taxa from Cyprus. Other works including parts of the encyclopedia Flora Europaea, Willows and Poplars of Great Britain and Ireland from 1984 and Garden Plants from 1963. He has written articles for the Irish Naturalists' Journal since the 1940s and he was editor of the Draft index of author abbreviations compiled at the Herbarium, Royal Botanic Gardens, Kew from 1980.

This botanist is denoted by the author abbreviation Meikle when citing a botanical name.

He retired from the Herbarium at the Royal Botanic Gardens, Kew in 1983, where he had held the grade of Principal Scientific Officer.

Meikle married algologist Carola Dickinson in 1960. Meikle died in February 2021 at the age of 97.

== Honours ==
In June 1983, Meikle was made an Officer of the Order of the British Empire (OBE).

== Books ==
Flora of Cyprus: 1 (1977). R.D. Meikle. Bentham-Moxon Trust; UK. ISBN 9780950487632

Flora of Cyprus: 2 (1985). R.D. Meikle. Bentham-Moxon Trust; UK. ISBN 9780950487649

== Sources ==
- Robert Zander (Author), Fritz Encke, Günther Buchheim, Siegmund Seybold (Editors): Handwörterbuch der Pflanzennamen. 13. Edition; Eugen Ulmer Verlag, Stuttgart, 1984, ISBN 3-8001-5042-5 (German)
