= Agios Theodoros, Larnaca =

Agios Theodoros Άγιος Θεόδωρος (Cypriot Greek) Aytotoro / Boğaziçi (Cypriot Turkish)
- Location in Cyprus
- Coordinates: 34°47′59″N 33°23′2″E
- Country: Cyprus
- District: Larnaca District

Government
  - Type: Community

Area
  - Land: 14.74 sq mi (38.17 km^{2})

Population (2021)
  - Total: 727
- Time zone: UTC+2 (EET)
  - Summer (DST): UTC+3 (EEST)
- Website: http://www.agiostheodoros.org/

Agios Theodoros (Note: Alternatively spelled Ayios Theodoros. The town is also sometimes referred to as Agios Theodoros Skarinou (Cypriot Greek: Άγιος Θεόδωρος Σκαρίνου) to distinguish it from other Cypriot towns of similar name.) (Cypriot Greek: Άγιος Θεόδωρος; Cypriot Turkish: Aytotoro or Boğaziçi) is a village located in the Larnaca District of Cyprus, located about 40 km south of the capital Nicosia and 20 km west of the district's capital of Larnaca. As of the last official census in 2021, the village had a population of 727.

== Etymology ==
The village's Cypriot Greek name, Agios Theodoros (Cypriot Greek: Άγιος Θεόδωρος) is said to have been named after the village's patron saint Saint Theodore of Tiron. It is likely that the Cypriot Turkish name for the village, Aytotoro, was a variation of the Greek name.

In some instances, the village is referred to as Agios Theodoros Skarinou (Cypriot Greek: Άγιος Θεόδωρος Σκαρίνου) referring to the nearby town of Skarinou, to distinguish itself from other villages in Cyprus called Agios Theodoros, including those in Limassol, Nicosia, Tilliria, Famagusta, and Karpasia.

In 1958, the Turkish Cypriot community adopted the alternative name for the village, Boğaziçi, meaning "strait" (Turkish: boğaz) or "Bosphorus".

== Geography ==
=== Physical geography ===
Agios Theodoros is located in the south-west of the island of Cyprus, at an altitude of approximately 80 meters above sea level. The land around the village is hilly in the west and flat in the east, being almost entirely agricultural due to the favourable lands surrounding the Pentaschoinos River upon which the village was built. In the past, cultivation of citrus fruits was a main occupation for many residents. The river flows directly through the town, and can be crossed by a bridge.

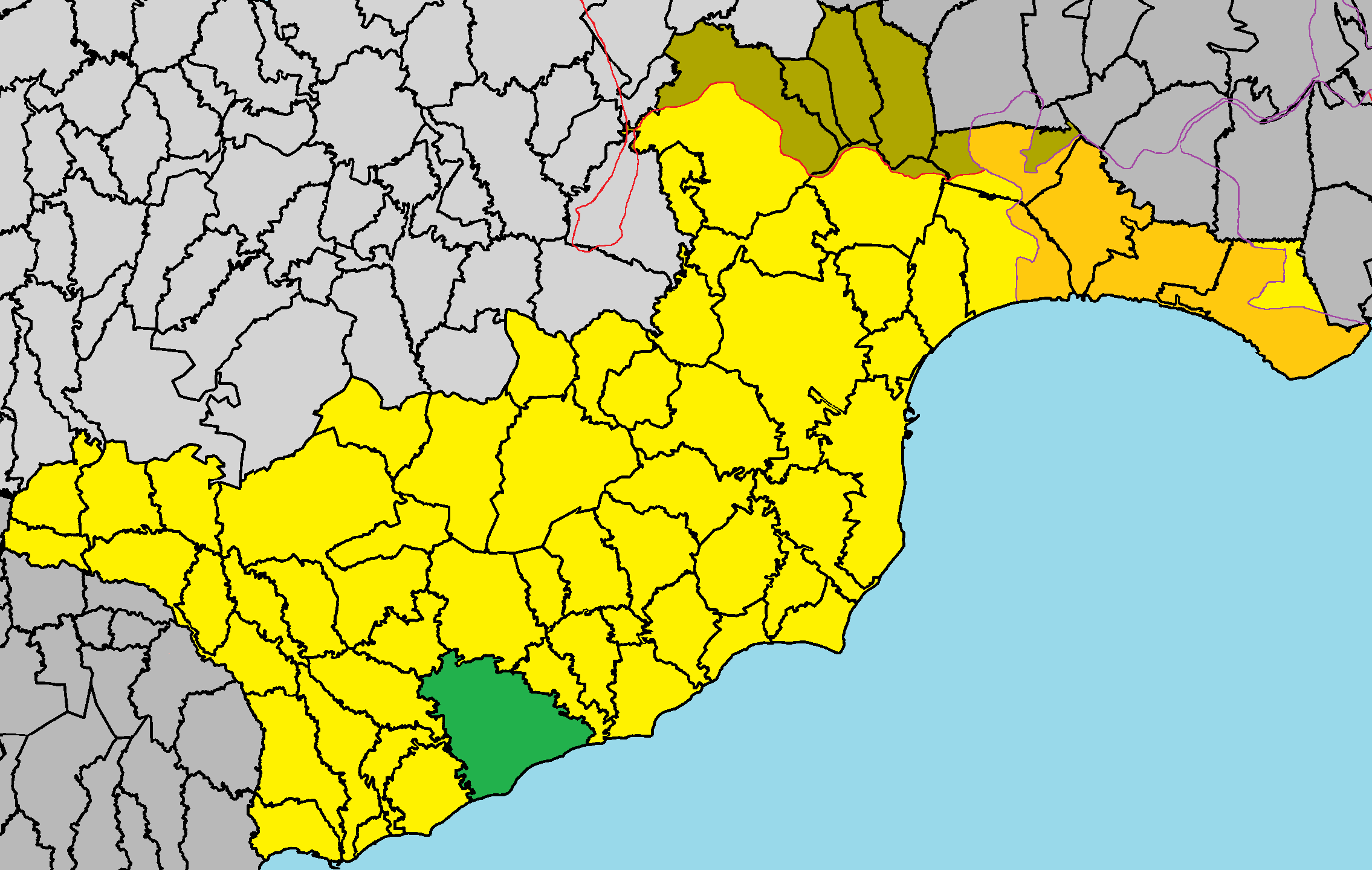
Location of the Agios Theodoros municipality within the Larnaca District.

Although the village of Agios Theodoros is about 4 kilometers from the coastline, the municipality of the same name extends to the Mediterranean Sea, and includes several kilometers of beach and rocky coastline.

The climate of Agios Theodoros is temperate, with an average temperature of 22 °C. On average, the hottest month is August, with a daily mean of 31 °C, while the coolest is January, with a daily mean of 14 °C. The wettest month is December, with an average of 3.98 precipitation days, and the driest is July, with an average of zero precipitation days.

Climate data for Agios Theodoros, Larnaca
Month	Jan	Feb	Mar	Apr	May	Jun	Jul	Aug	Sep	Oct	Nov	Dec	Year
Record high °C (°F)	19.91 (67.84)	23.89 (75.00)	25.88 (78.58)	29.86 (85.75)	32.85 (91.13)	36.83 (98.29)	38.82 (101.88)	38.82 (101.88)	35.84 (96.51)	31.86 (89.35)	27.87 (82.17)	24.89 (76.80)	38.82 (101.88)
Mean daily maximum °C (°F)	15.31 (59.56)	16.21 (61.18)	18.29 (64.92)	21.41 (70.54)	25.48 (77.86)	29.05 (84.29)	32.06 (89.71)	32.58 (90.64)	30.41 (86.74)	26.38 (79.48)	21.75 (71.15)	17.45 (63.41)	23.86 (74.95)
Daily mean °C (°F)	13.71 (56.68)	14.44 (57.99)	16.41 (61.54)	19.62 (67.32)	23.92 (75.06)	27.61 (81.70)	30.51 (86.92)	30.96 (87.73)	28.82 (83.88)	24.81 (76.66)	20.28 (68.50)	15.99 (60.78)	22.26 (72.07)
Mean daily minimum °C (°F)	10.96 (51.73)	10.89 (51.60)	11.97 (53.55)	14.98 (58.96)	19.65 (67.37)	23.32 (73.98)	25.76 (78.37)	26.28 (79.30)	24.48 (76.06)	21.23 (70.21)	17.47 (63.45)	13.42 (56.16)	18.37 (65.07)
Record low °C (°F)	2.99 (37.38)	1.99 (35.58)	4.98 (40.96)	9.96 (49.93)	14.93 (58.87)	17.92 (64.26)	20.91 (69.64)	21.9 (71.4)	18.91 (66.04)	15.93 (60.67)	11.95 (53.51)	5.97 (42.75)	1.99 (35.58)
Average precipitation mm (inches)	19.45 (0.77)	13.12 (0.52)	8.75 (0.34)	9.91 (0.39)	7.44 (0.29)	2.0 (0.08)	0.11 (0.00)	0.19 (0.01)	1.09 (0.04)	7.81 (0.31)	14.36 (0.57)	23.46 (0.92)	8.97 (0.35)
Average precipitation days (≥ 1.0 mm)	3.89	2.44	1.99	2.35	1.9	0.82	0.0	0.0	0.27	2.08	3.08	3.98	1.9
Average relative humidity (%)	69.38	68.75	66.46	62.9	58.2	56.91	56.27	57.51	57.18	56.85	59.03	65.8	61.27
Source: Weather and Climate

=== Urban geography ===
Agios Theodoros is located about 41 km south of the capital Nicosia, 3 km from the nearby town of Kofinou, and 26 km southwest of the district's capital of Larnaca. Other nearby towns include Skarinou in the north, Alaminos, Anafotia, and Mazotos in the east, and Maroni, Psematismenos, Tochni, and Chrirokitia in the west.

The A1 and B1 Motorways from Nicosia to Limassol, and the A5 and B5 to Larnaca run north of the municipality.

== Demographics ==
Historical population
Year	Pop.	±%
1833	96 (Note: This figure is likely smaller than the actual population of the town, as the 1832/33 Ottoman Property Survey of Cyprus in some cases recorded all dependents of a household under one entry for the head of the household.)	—
1881	560	—
1891	662	+18.2%
1901	776	+17.2%
1911	889	+14.6%
1921	1,105	+24.3%
1931	1,175	+6.3%
1946	1,402	+19.3%
1960	1,210	−13.7%
1973	1,191	−1.6%
1976	777	−34.8%
1982	661	−14.9%
1992	557	−15.7%
2001	599	+7.5%
2011	663	+10.7%
2021	727	+9.7%

Several censuses have been undertaken capturing the population statistics of Agios Theodoros, namely by the Ottomans in 1833, the British in 1881, 1891, 1901, 1911, 1921, 1931, and 1946, and the Republic of Cyprus in 1960, 1973, 1976, 1982, 1992, 2001, 2011, and 2021.

In 1833, the Ottoman Property Survey of Cyprus recorded the village as a mixed village, containing 64 households. The 'mixed' status provided for in the census referred to 'muslims' and 'non-Muslims', as opposed to the modern distinctions between Turkish Cypriots and Greek Cypriots. Of the 96 persons recorded, 49 were muslim, and 47 were non-Muslim.

Until the year 1946, the population of Turkish Cypriot to Greek Cypriot residents remained generally equivalent, however, in the 1960 and 1973 censuses the Turkish Cypriot population predominated. In 1971, Richard Patrick recorded 96 Turkish Cypriots living in the village that had been displaced from the nearby villages of Pervolia, Anafotia, and Anglisides during the island's intercommunal violence. Following the 1974 Cypriot coup d'état, and resulting Turkish invasion of Cyprus, the Turkish Cypriot population diminished entirely.

== History ==
=== Early history ===
Agios Theodoros is not mentioned on ancient maps of Cyprus, however, it has been suggested that the village was built on the ruins of the ancient settlements of Nastadia, Xeugalalio, Capno, Vasilopotamo and particularly, Pendasino, which appear on medieval maps of Cyprus. The latter was destroyed in an earthquake in 1491, and its surviving residents abandoned the area. During the Frankish period the local area was a fief, and upon the island becoming part of the Ottoman Empire, the lands were given to the military officers Lala-Mustafa Paşa and Piyale Paşa.

According to one source, the modern village was built by residents of villages on the coastline of the Agios Theodoros municipality who fled due to pirate raids. The modern location was chosen as it was hidden behind high hills and was not visible from the sea.

It has been said that during the Ottoman period, the village was home to a community of Crypto-Christians known as the Linobambaki, who were followers of the Greek Orthodox faith and persecuted for their religion. Due to this, the group chose to appear outwardly Muslim. During British rule, they were assimilated into the Turkish Cypriot community.

In 1847, a shrine to the eponymous Saint Theodoros constructed, and between 1956 and 1970 a church was constructed on the same site. The church still exists today. Other religious sites built in the village include the Saint Athanasios chapel, Agioi Anargiroi chapel, Panagia Astathkiotissa Chapel, and a Turkish Cypriot mosque.

=== Intercommunal violence (1960s) ===
During Cyprus' intercommunal violence of the 1950s and 1960s, the village experienced some conflict. In December 1963, the village's Turkish Cypriot neighbourhood became controlled by the Turkish Resistance Organisation (TMT), a guerilla organisation formed to counter the pro-enosis EOKA, and became part of the Geçitkale enclave. It has been suggested that the TMT were supported by the British administration. In March 1964, a Swedish peacekeeping force was deployed to the region by the UNFICYP, tasked with preventing intercommunal violence. A section of these peacekeepers were stationed at Agios Theodoros.

From November 1966, the Geçitkale enclave became increasingly militarised, with TMT personnel blocking road traffic, to prevent the Cypriot police, National Guard, and in some instances, Greek Cypriots from moving freely without UN escort. In some occasions, fuel was demanded, as the local Cypriot authorities had suspended regular fuel supplies to the enclave. On 25 and 26 January 1967, two Greek Cypriot buses were stopped by TMT personnel and delayed from proceeding until local peacekeepers intervened.

Following these incidents, Greek General Georgios Grivas, commander of the National Guard ordered a battalion-sized unit supported by armoured vehicles to proceed immediately to Kofinou, in the Geçitkale enclave. Demands by UN peacekeepers for the withdrawal of the troops were unsuccessful. On 28 February 1967, the National Guard reinforced its troops in the area, and in response to the build-up and accompanying prevention of movement for local Turkish Cypriot herders, the TMT advanced and established new positions around Agios Theodoros.

In March 1967, members of the TMT clashed with UN peacekeepers in the nearby village of Kofinou, and the Cypriot police were asked to vacate the town by the UN. The National Guard however, remained, and the UN determined that this added to the instability in the region. The UN also concluded that these events were conducted by rogue TMT members who did not follow the orders of their superiors.

In July 1967, four shootings occurred in the village, and in September, Cypriot police began to patrol the village. The TMT were reported as threatening and abusing the police and their UN escorts. On 13 November, President Makarios, General Grivas, and the Minister of the Interior Epameinondas Komodromos expressed to Special Representative of the Secretary-General of the United Nations, José Rolz-Bennett and the UNFICYP Commander, their deep concern at the situation regarding police patrols in Agios Theodoros. The UN personnel strongly recommended that the police patrols be postponed, however, the Cypriot Government disagreed, and sent two police patrols to the town, one from the north and one from the south. On 14 November 1967, the local National Guard commander informed the local head of the UNFICYP of the planned patrols, requesting their protection for the police. When the UN disagreed with the plan, assessing that the conditions were not appropriate for a show of force against the TMT, the National Guard, led by General Grivas, accompanied the police. The patrols proceeded without incident.

==== Operation Gronthos ====
On 15 November 1967, General Grivas launched "Operation Gronthos". At 10am, another police patrol escorted by the National Guard moved towards the village without difficulty, with Turkish Cypriots removing a tractor blocking the entrance to the village without any coercion from the police or National Guard. At 2pm, another patrol began of the village, now accompanied by an infantry platoon of the Special Forces Command. Upon reaching the northern entrance to the village, the patrol found a tractor and plow blocking the road. Upon reaching the obstacle, the TMT fired three shots and a burst of automatic fire at the patrol, and a firefight broke out between the two groups. Killings of Turkish Cypriot civilians and looting were reported to have been committed by Grivas' troops. By the evening, the conflict had ceased and the National Guard took control of the village. In doing so, the National Guard went from house to house removing all civilians and moving them outside of the village. Simultaneously, a similar conflict broke out at Kofinou.

On 16 November 1967, UN peacekeepers entered the villages of Agios Theodoros and Kofinou and identified twenty-four deaths, of which two were Greek Cypriots, and twenty-two were Turkish Cypriots. Later UN counts revised the figure to twenty-four Turkish Cypriot deaths and nine woundings, and one death and two woundings within the National Guard forces. The report of the Secretary-General of the United Nations described the events of 15 November as "senseless and deplorable", additionally noting that "much of the UNFICYP forces in the area was also under fire by the National Guard for most of the afternoon of 15 November", and other instances of deliberate damage to UN property and the forcible disarming of UN peacekeepers at gunpoint by the National Guard. The UN report ultimately stated that:

The magnitude of the Ayios Theodhoros operation and the speed with which it was carried out clearly indicate that the National Guard had planned in advance to carry out this operation in the event of any show of opposition by the Turkish Cypriots. The running of several patrols at short intervals was not customary and was no doubt an important factor in the developments that followed.

Following the incident, the National Guard withdrew, and the Turkish Cypriot villagers were permitted to return to their homes, although Turkish news reported that approximately 200 young men were unaccounted for. The incident sparked outrage from the Turkish government, who sent an ultimatum on 17 November 1967 to the Greek Military Junta, requiring amongst other things, compensation to be provided to the victims of the attacks in Agios Theodoros. On the same day, the Turkish Parliament authorised the government to go to war with Greece, should the Cypriot situation deteriorate further. The events are considered to have enflamed Greek-Turkish relations, and be a major precursor to the Turkish decision to invade the island in 1974 following the Greek Junta-led coup d'état. On November 15 itself, the Turkish Minister for Foreign Affairs İhsan Sabri Çağlayangil was reported as saying:

The attack launched against the Ayios Theodhoros area has introduced an element of complication such as has not been seen since 1964. Such action, while there was still a possibility of reaching a negotiated solution of the Ayios Theodhoros problem, constitutes a flagrant provocation by the Cyprus Government. UNFICYP is requested to stop the fighting immediately and clear the Turkish Cypriot areas of Ayios Theodoros and Kophinou of both Greek Cypriot and Greek armed forces. If this cannot be done, a crisis which will go beyond the borders of the Island will be unavoidable. We therefore request immediate action by UNFICYP. (Note: Translated from the original Turkish in the Special Report by the Secretary-General on Recent Developments in Cyprus (1967).)

On 23 November, the shipment of materials provided by the government began to be transported to the village by the UN for housing repairs to begin. On the military-front, the TMT reoccupied their positions, however activities were significantly reduced and roadblocks were removed. Similarly, the National Guard reduced its strength in the area to one platoon, and Cypriot Police reduced to three constables, with police patrols of the village being suspended. The TMT attitude towards the UN peacekeepers also improved, particularly due to their efforts to restore normal living conditions. Payment of compensation for damages incurred by the UNFICYP was made by the Cypriot Government, however, claims for compensation to the Turkish Cypriot community were refused. Ultimately, relations between the Greek Cypriot and Turkish Cypriot populations of the village normalised, although reports of TMT personnel restricting the movement of Greek Cypriots through the Turkish Cypriot neighbourhood continued. As of 1969, the UNFICYP remained in Agios Theodoros with a peacekeeping force from the United Kingdom and Australia.

===== Treatment of Operation Gronthos as a massacre =====
It is debated amongst sources whether the events of 15 November 1967 in Agios Theodoros and Kofinou were massacres. While some Greek Cypriot and Turkish Cypriot sources have considered the events to be massacres, others have disagreed. For example, some Greek Cypriot newspapers at the time called it a "bloodless operation", and that Operation Gronthos was carried out "without a single shot being fired and without anyone getting a bloody nose".

In an interview with Marios Tembriotis, a member of the 32nd commando squadron of the Special Forces Command, Tembriotis recounted his experience undertaking Operation Gronthos as involving killings of Turkish Cypriot civilians, destruction of property, and looting. He recalled his commander telling his squadron that "they will accuse us of genocide, but I want you to go in and not leave even a single lame chicken behind", and attested that for those Turkish Cypriot civilians who could not escape from the village, all were murdered. In another incident mentioned by Tembriotis, while he moved a young Turkish Cypriot who had been shot eight times, his captain stated that he wanted to kill the man, only choosing not to when Tembriotis said he would shoot his captain if he did so.

=== Displacement of the Turkish Cypriot population (1974-5) ===
Agios Theodoros remained a mixed village until after the 1974 Cypriot coup d'état, and resulting Turkish invasion of Cyprus. During this period, most of the Turkish Cypriot population moved to Northern Cyprus, and those who remained were forcibly transferred by the UNFICYP in August 1975. Most of these displaced persons settled in Agios Sergios, which they renamed to Yeniboğaziçi (lit. New Boğaziçi) after the Turkish name of Agios Theodoros. The total number of Turkish Cypriots displaced from the village is estimated to be around 750. Remnants of the former Turkish Cypriot neighbourhood have fallen into disuse, such as the former school, however, some homes have been resettled by Greek Cypriots.

=== Recent history ===
In 2019, the 800 meter 'To Vrytzi' trail in the Agios Theodoros municipality was awarded the Green Flag in Cyprus at the Green City and Green Community of Cyprus Awards for sustainable tourism.
