= Lefkara lace =

Lacemaking tradition and intagible cultural heritage of Cyprus

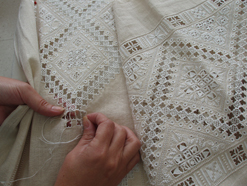
- Lefkara lace or Lefkaritiko
- Type: Embroidery
- Material: Cotton
- Production method: Needle lace
- Production process: Handicraft
- Place of origin: Pano Lefkara, Cyprus

Lefkara laces or Lefkaritika
- UNESCO Intangible Cultural Heritage
- Country: Cyprus
- Reference: 00255
- Region: Europe and North America

Inscription history
- Inscription: 2009 (4th session)
- List: Representative

Lefkaritika or Lefkara lace is a handmade lace from Pano Lefkara and Kato Lefkara, Cyprus. Notable characteristics are the hemstitch, satin stitch fillings, needlepoint edgings, white, brown, ecru colours and geometric intricate patterns. In 2009, it was added to UNESCO's Representative List of the Intangible Cultural Heritage.

== History ==
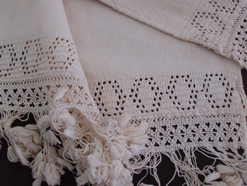
Asproploumi, the type that preceded Lefkaritika

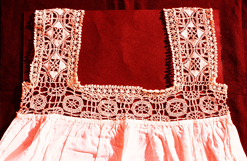
"Dantela Venis" ("Venice Lace") - "punto cyprioto"

Lefkaritika is a type of white embroidery art from Cyprus, dating back to at least the fourteenth century. It is an evolution from an older type, called asproploumia. The main stitches of asproploumia survived in the newest type of Lefkaritika. New stitches and motifs are added depending on the skill and creativity of the embroider. Lefkaritika reached a higher level of quality, because of the competition between women, as they were considered to be a centerpiece of a dowry. Each woman had to have an extended collection ready for exhibition on her wedding day. This way a lot of the traditional elements were passed from mother to daughter. Many women practiced embroidery as a profession as well. Women embroideresses in Pano Lefkara, called ploumarisses organised their production from home. Men from Lefkara, called kentitarides, were merchants and they traveled across Europe and Scandinavia. According to tradition, in 15th century Leonardo da Vinci visited Cyprus and took a piece of Lefkara lace back to Italy with him, which today decorates Milan Cathedral.

Artisans of the lace community continue to produce skilled work as an economic activity among women, as they have for centuries, and some aim to preserve the heritage and traditions.

== Centers of production ==
The largest centers of production used to be the villages of Pano Lefkara and Kato Lefkara. Today these embroideries are manufactured all over Cyprus, especially in the villages of Kato Drys, Vavla, Vavatsinia, Ora, Choirokoitia, Skarinou, Dali and Athienou.

== Materials and technique ==
The first Lefkara lace was made from the local white cotton fabric produced in Cyprus. A combination of stitches and cuts is used. The large embroideries called tagiades are added to dantela Venis (Venice lace), pittota, gyroulota and liminota patterns. Their name comes from the Italian Punto Tagliato, a kind of a cut design popular in Italy during the 16th century. According to the Cyprus Handicraft Service, the different motifs for Lefkara lace add up to more than 650.

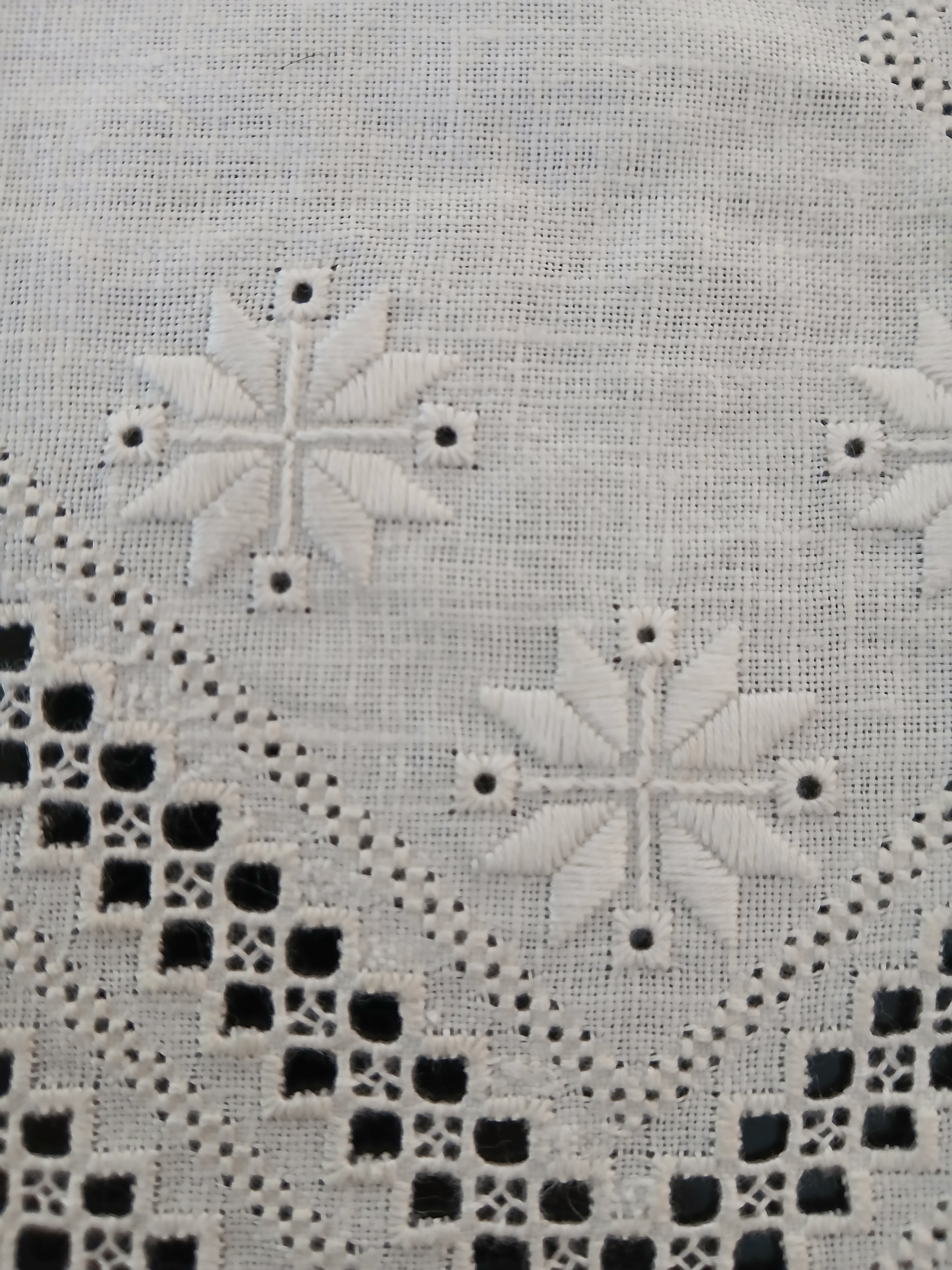
Lefkara lace close up

The most characteristic pattern in Lefkara lace is potamoi (rivers). They made from triangular zig-zags, called kamares (arcs).

Contemporary lacemakers can reproduce Lefkara lace with guidance from books of historical information and patterns.

== Bibliography ==
Chatzigiasemi, Androula (1987). Lefkara lace embroidery: historical development, designs, techniques. Nicosia: Ch. I. Philipides and son. ISBN 978-9963-7643-1-0.

Ktori, Maria (2017). "Lefkara Lace: Educational Approaches to ICH in Cyprus". International Journal of Intangible Heritage. 12: 77–92.
