= List of wars involving Cyprus =

This is a list of wars involving the Republic of Cyprus and its predecessor states.

Victory of Cyprus (and allies)
Defeat of Cyprus (and allies)
Another result*

*e.g. result unknown or indecisive/inconclusive, result of internal conflict inside Cyprus, status quo ante bellum, or a treaty or peace without a clear result.

Date	Name of the battle	Part of	1st combattant	2nd combattant	Result
306 BC	Battle of Salamis (306 BC)	Fourth War of the Diadochi	Antigonid dynasty	Ptolemaic dynasty	Decisive Antigonid victory
746	Battle of Keramaia	Arab–Byzantine wars	Byzantine Empire	Umayyad Caliphate	Byzantine victory
17 September 1570 - 5 August 1571	Siege of Famagusta	Ottoman–Venetian War (1570–1573) (Ottoman–Venetian wars)	Ottoman Empire	Republic of Venice	Ottoman victory

Conflict	Combatant 1	Combatant 2	Results
Greco-Persian Wars	Greek city-states: • Athens • Sparta • Thebes • Thespiae • Cyprus • Delian League	Achaemenid Empire Greek vassals: • Halicarnassus • Thessalia • Boeotia • Thebes • Macedon	Greek victory: Macedon, Thrace, and Ionia regain their independence from Persia
Kitos War	Roman Empire	Jews	Roman victory: Status quo ante bellum
Fifth Crusade (1217–1221)	Crusaders: Holy Roman Empire; Kingdom of Portugal; Kingdom of Hungary; Kingdom of France; Kingdom of Germany; Levant: Kingdom of Jerusalem; Kingdom of Cyprus; Latin Empire; Military orders: Knights Templar; Teutonic Order; Knights Hospitaller	Muslim forces: Ayyubid Sultanate	Ayyubid victory: Eight-year truce between the Ayyubids and the Crusaders
War of the Lombards (1228–1243)	. Kingdom of Cyprus; Anti-Imperial faction in the Kingdom of Jerusalem: Acre; Beirut; Arsuf; Caesarea; Republic of Genoa; Knights Templar; Papacy	Holy Roman Empire; Pro-Imperial faction in the Kingdom of Jerusalem: Tyre; Jerusalem; Principality of Antioch and County of Tripoli; Republic of Pisa; Knights Hospitaller; Teutonic Knights	Victory of anti-Imperial faction of local barons
Lord Edward's crusade (1271–1272)	Kingdom of England; Kingdom of Cyprus; Kingdom of Jerusalem; Antioch-Tripoli; Military orders: Knights Templar; Knights Hospitaller; Teutonic Order; Ilkhanate	Mamluk Sultanate; Bahris	Inconclusive: Jerusalem remains under Mamluks control; Arsuf, Safed, Jaffa, Antioch, Krak des Chevaliers, captured by the Mamluks; Ten-year truce between Mamluks and Crusaders
Smyrniote crusades (1343–1351)	Republic of Venice (Sovereign Military Order of Malta) Knights Hospitaller; Kingdom of Cyprus; Dauphiné of Viennois; Papal States	Emirate of Aydin	Inconclusive
Alexandrian Crusade (9–12 October 1365)	Kingdom of Cyprus; Republic of Venice; Knights Hospitaller	Mamluk Sultanate	Crusader victory
Cyprus Emergency (1955–1959)	EOKA	United Kingdom: British Cyprus; Turkey: Special Warfare Department; Turkish Resistance Organisation	London and Zürich Agreements: Independence of the Republic of Cyprus; Enosis and Taksim not achieved; Britain retains bases at Akrotiri and Dhekelia; EOKA not defeated
Cyprus crisis of 1963–64	Cyprus	TMT; Turkey (1964)	End of Turkish Cypriot participation in government; Establishment of Green Line and partition of Nicosia; Turkish Cypriot population movement into enclaves; Deployment of UNFICYP in 1964
Cyprus crisis of 1967	Cyprus; Greece	TMT; Turkey	Greek Cypriot control of Agios Theodoros and Kophinou; General Georgios Grivas and 12,000 Greek troops removed from Cyprus
Turkish invasion of Cyprus (1974)	Republic of Cyprus; EOKA B; Greece	Turkey; (Turkey) Turkish Resistance Organisation	Turkish victory: Greek military junta collapses on 24 July 1974; 200,000 Greek Cypriots displaced; 50,000 Turkish Cypriots displaced; Turkey occupies 36.2% of Cyprus; Formation of the Autonomous Turkish Cypriot Administration
Egyptian raid on Larnaca International Airport (1978)	Cyprus	Egypt	Cypriot Victory
2026 Iran war: 2026 Iranian strikes on Akrotiri and Dhekelia	Cyprus; Greece; France	Iran; Hezbollah	Allied victory

== Other armed conflicts involving Cyprus ==
- Ionian Revolt 499-493 BC
