= Aplanta =

- Village
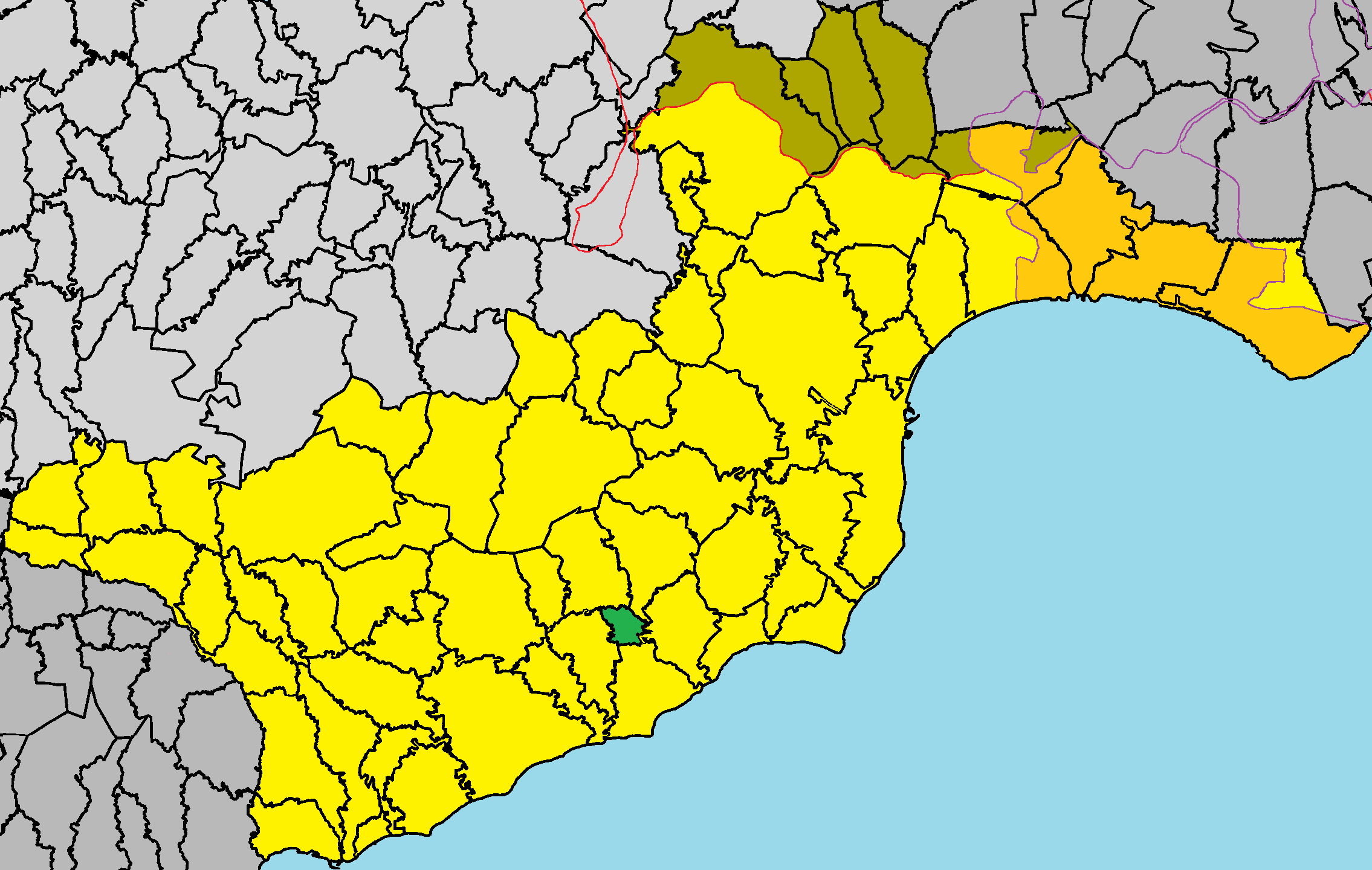
- Location of Aplanta in Larnaca district

- Location in Cyprus
- Coordinates: 34°49′42″N 33°28′31″E
- Country: Cyprus
- District: Larnaca District

Aplanta (Greek: Απλάντα; Turkish: Aplanda) is an abandoned village in the Larnaca District of Cyprus, located 4 km south of Anglisides. Aplanta was inhabited exclusively by Turkish Cypriots; in 1960, they numbered 55. Due to the Cyprus crisis of 1963–64 they fled to Kivisili in December 1963. After the 1974 Turkish invasion and subsequent partition of the island, most moved to Limnia.
