= Delikipos =

Delikipos Δελίκηπος
- Village
- Location in Cyprus
- Coordinates: 34°55′0″N 33°21′43″E
- Country: Cyprus
- District: Larnaca District

Population (2011)
  - Total: 23
- Time zone: UTC+2 (EET)
  - Summer (DST): UTC+3 (EEST)

Delikipos (Greek: Δελίκηπος) is a village in the Larnaca District of Cyprus, located 4 km (2.5 mi) west of Kornos.

== Etymology ==
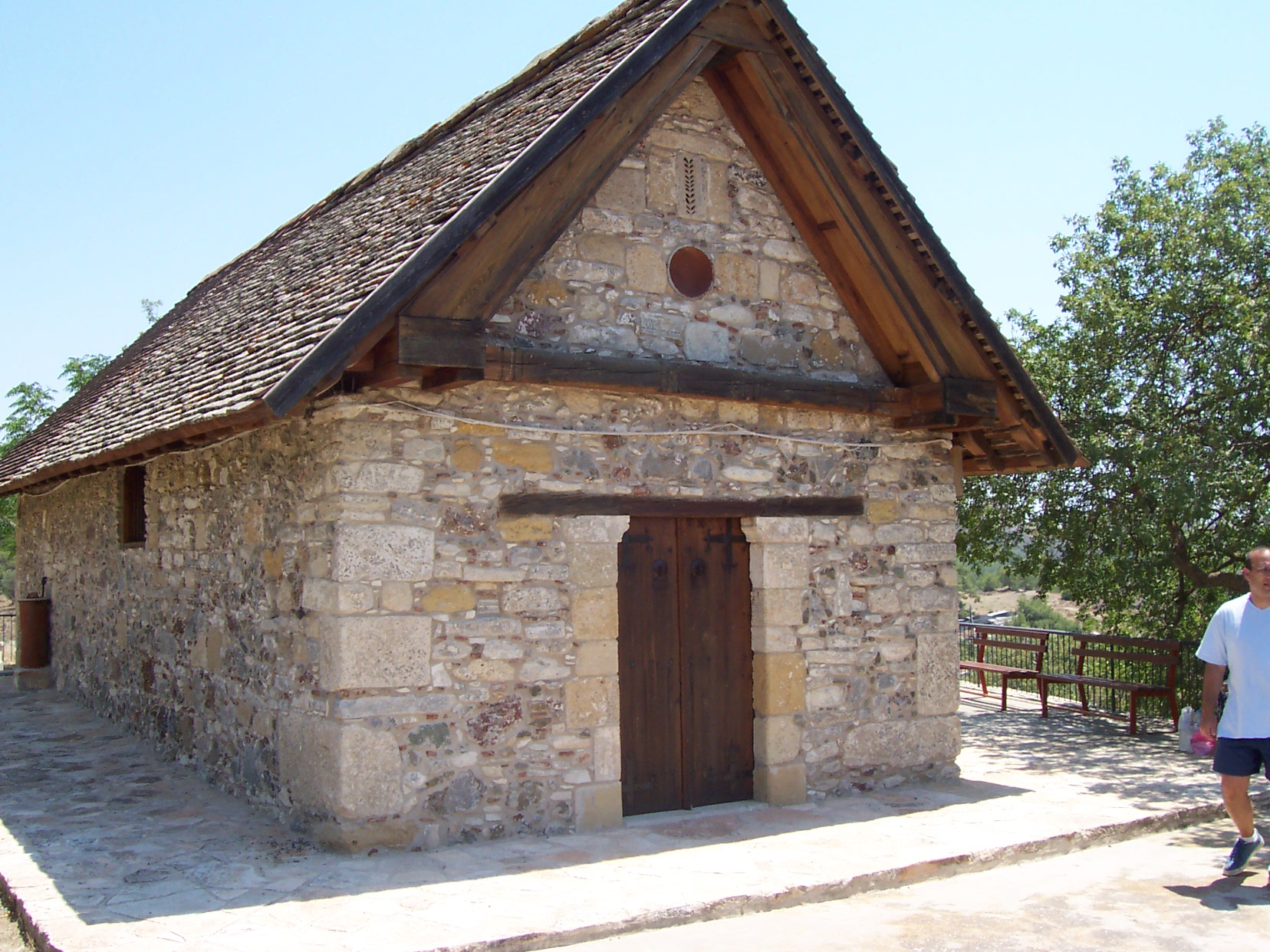
Church of the Transfiguration

There are two versions are available with regards to the naming of the village. The first version, as the Great Cyprus Encyclopaedia preserves, links the naming of the village with the name of the first owner of the area who was named Delis. More specifically, the name of the village derives from the phrase “the garden (kipos) of Delis”. Another version supports that the village’s name is a compound word formed by the Italian word “bella” which means beautiful and the Greek word “kipos” which means garden, concluding that the meaning of the compound name is “beautiful garden”. According to the Great Cyprus Encyclopaedia, this version is the most correct one because the village existed prior to the Ottoman occupation (1570–71).

== History ==
The village has a church dedicated to the Transfiguration. According to an inscription in the interior, the foundations were laid in January 1723 and the church was finished in March of that year, during the time of Archbishop Silvestros (1718–1723). However, fragments of an older building were used, including portions of a mediaeval doorway. Like many villages in Cyprus, its pre-1955 population contained a mix of Greek and Turkish Cypriots, but the Turks left the village during the struggle for independence between 1955-59. The village still has the remains of a small Μosque, marked as a tzami a Muslim place of worship.

== Transportation ==
Delikipos is situated close to the F105 road which goes from Pyrga to Pano Lefkara. This passed through Delikipos until 1986 when a by-pass was constructed, mainly to take traffic away from the nearby Kornos Military Camp, which was built on the old road, and for access to the newly built Delikipos military camp, which is a further 4 km west. It was built to coincide with the opening of the Kornos interchange of the A1 Motorway. Prior to 2000, the village contained no tarmac roads – only a small section in the centre of the village was concrete. The rest were mud/dirt roads. All the roads are now tarmac. In addition to the Kornos–Pano Lefkara road, Delikipos also has direct roads to Lythrodontas (about 8 km) and Mathiatis (about 6 km) in the Nicosia district – both of which are part tarmac, part unsurfaced. It is also connected by bus to Larnaca on routes 410 and night bus route 455. Delikipos is also the end point of the E4 long-distance hiking trail from Klavdia.

== Modern times ==
In 2008, the Pharos Arts Foundation inaugurated in Delikipos an idyllic, open-air classical music venue, The Olive Grove, which has hosted some of the most renowned soloists and ensembles in the world. The long-term objective of this initiative is to expand The Olive Grove into an international center for art, culture and dialogue so as to provide a space for the visual and performing arts as well as a library and accommodation for visiting artists, writers, composers, musicians, and thinkers from all disciplines and backgrounds.

Every year, the village celebrates the festival of "Metamorphoseos Soteros" (Feast of the Transfiguration) on August 6, with a large festival the evening before. It attracts visitors from the surrounding areas and overseas.
