= Menogeia =

- Village
- Location in Cyprus
- Coordinates: 34°50′34″N 33°26′27″E
- Country: Cyprus
- District: Larnaca District

Area
  - Metro: 58 sq mi (150 km^{2})

Population (2011)
  - Village: 50
- Time zone: UTC+2 (EET)
  - Summer (DST): UTC+3 (EEST)

Menogeia (Greek: Μενόγεια; Turkish: Ötüken or Mennoya) is a village in the Larnaca District of Cyprus, located 2 km west of Anglisides. In 2011, it had a population of 50.

Menogeia was a mixed Greek- and Turkish-Cypriot village until 1946. Between 1960 and 1974, it was inhabited exclusively by Turkish Cypriots. Following the Turkish invasion in 1974, they were all displaced; most settled in Spathariko in the north.
