= Melini =

Melini Μελίνη
- Village
- Location in Cyprus
- Coordinates: 34°51′59″N 33°9′23″E
- Country: Cyprus
- District: Larnaca District

Population (2011)
  - Total: 59
- Time zone: UTC+2 (EET)
  - Summer (DST): UTC+3 (EEST)

Melini (Greek: Μελίνη) is a village in the Larnaca District of Cyprus, 4 km west of Ora. Its population in 2011 was 59.
