= Agia Anna =

Agia Anna may refer to:

- The Greek name for Saint Anne
- Agia Anna, Euboea, a village on the island Euboea, Greece
- Agia Anna, Elis, a village in Elis, Greece
- Agia Anna, Cyprus, a village near Larnaca, Cyprus
