= Lefkara =

Lefkara may refer to:

- Kato Lefkara, a village in Cyprus
- Pano Lefkara, a municipality in Cyprus
