= Psevdas =

- Village
- Location in Cyprus
- Coordinates: 34°57′3″N 33°27′48″E
- Country: Cyprus
- District: Larnaca District

Population (2011)
  - Total: 1,261
- Time zone: UTC+2 (EET)
  - Summer (DST): UTC+3 (EEST)

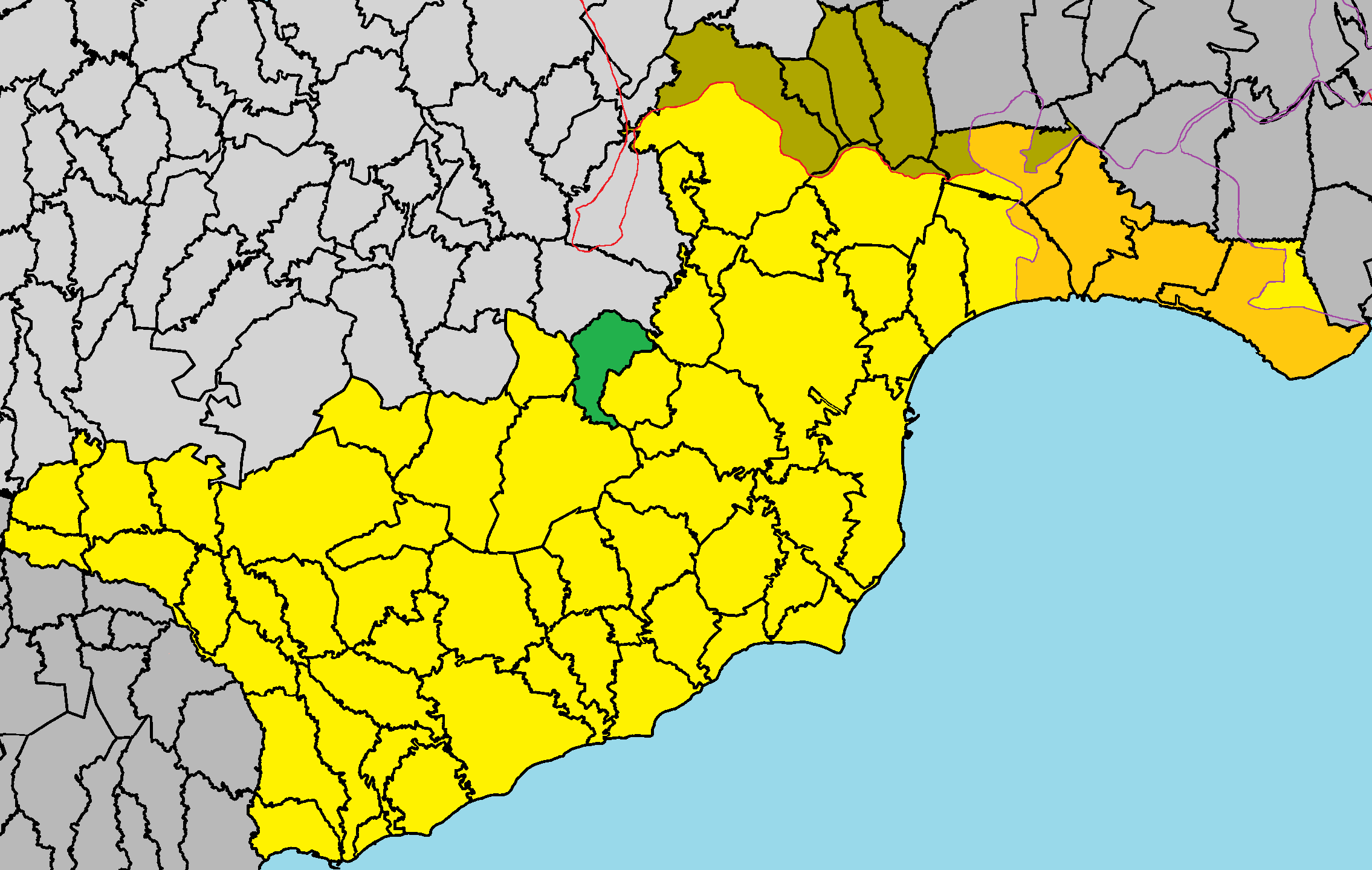
Psevdas in Larnaca District.

Psevdas (Greek: Ψευδάς [locally [psefˈtas]]) is a village in the Larnaca District of Cyprus, located 4 km east of Mosfiloti.
