= Odou =

Odou Odhou
- Village
- Location in Cyprus
- Coordinates: 34°53′6″N 33°9′3″E
- Country: Cyprus
- District: Larnaca District

Population (2011)
  - Total: 213
- Time zone: UTC+2 (EET)
  - Summer (DST): UTC+3 (EEST)
- ZIP Code: 7718

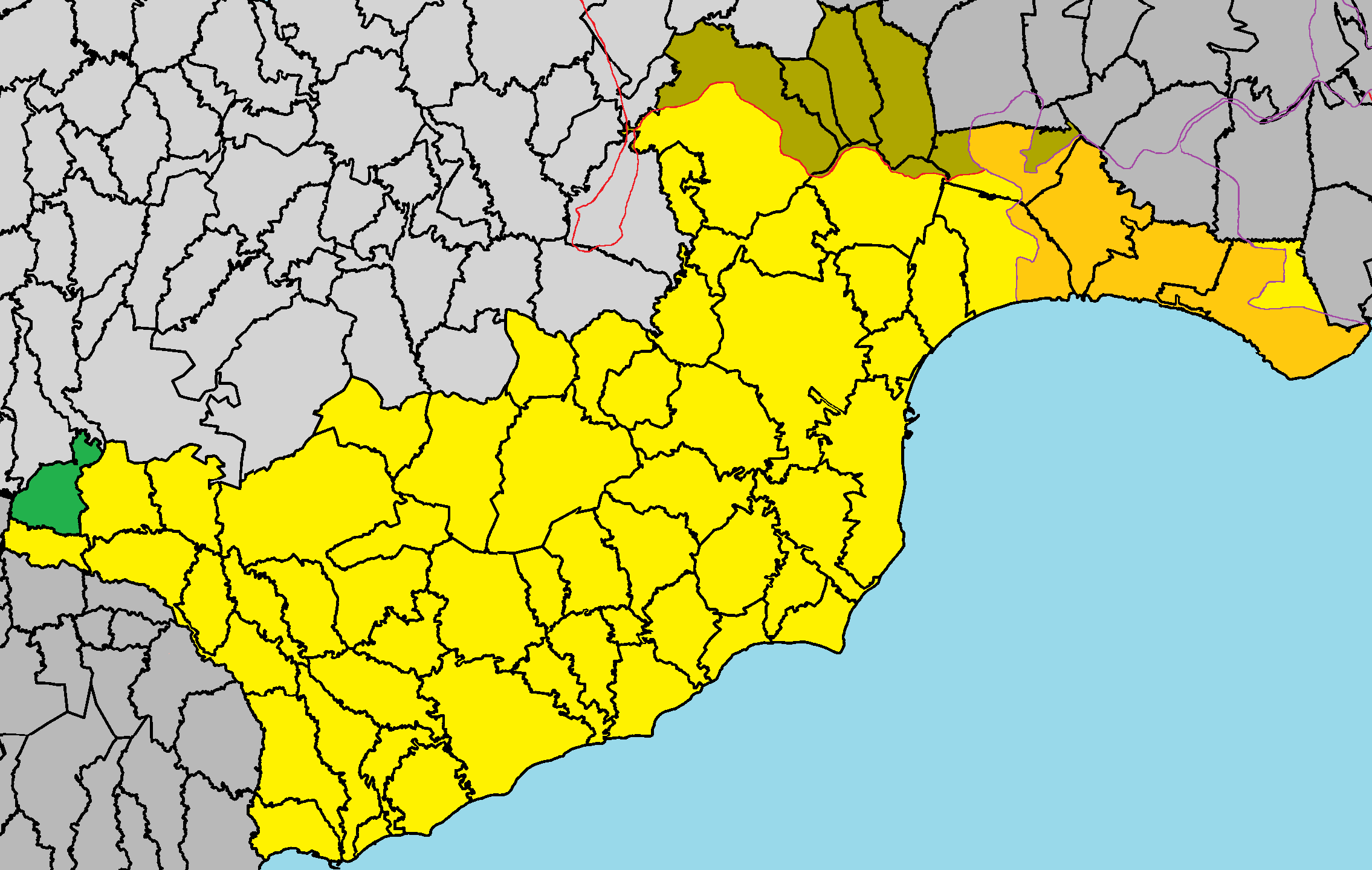
Odou in Larnaca District.

Odou (Greek: Οδού) is a village in the Larnaca District of Cyprus, 8 km northwest of Ora. Its population in 2011 was 213.

Odou is the most mountainous settlement within the province of Larnaca. It is located in the city’s northwest and borders the Nicosia and Limassol provinces. There are two different origin stories for the name Odou: The first version is derived from the generic term “odos,” which dates back to the early Byzantine period, when it had not yet been replaced by the Latin word “strata” and was naturalised during the Frankish era. According to the second and most prevalent version, the village was the road that connected the kingdoms of Tamasos and Amathus, which is why the sign on the village’s main street reads “Tamaso-Amathus.” In fact, the tradition that Agios Heraklidios wishes to travel from Mathykoloni to Odou and then to his residence in Tampsos indicates that a road has existed in the Odou region since ancient times.
