= Agia Anna, Cyprus =

Agia Anna
- Village
- Αγία Άννα (Greek); Akhisar (Turkish)
- Location in Cyprus
- Coordinates: 34°56′29″N 33°28′59″E
- Country: Cyprus
- District: Larnaca District

Government
  - Type: Community

Population (2011)
  - Total: 339
- Time zone: UTC+2 (EET)
  - Summer (DST): UTC+3 (EEST)

Agia Anna (Greek: Αγία Άννα; Turkish: Akhisar) is a village in the Larnaca District of Cyprus, 16 km west of Larnaca. Its population in 2011 was 339.

During the Bloody Christmas, 110 Turks from the village fled to Kofinou and Vuda. In 1971 some of them returned, but during the 1974 invasion, the whole population fled to Ötüken in Famagusta.
