= Petrofani =

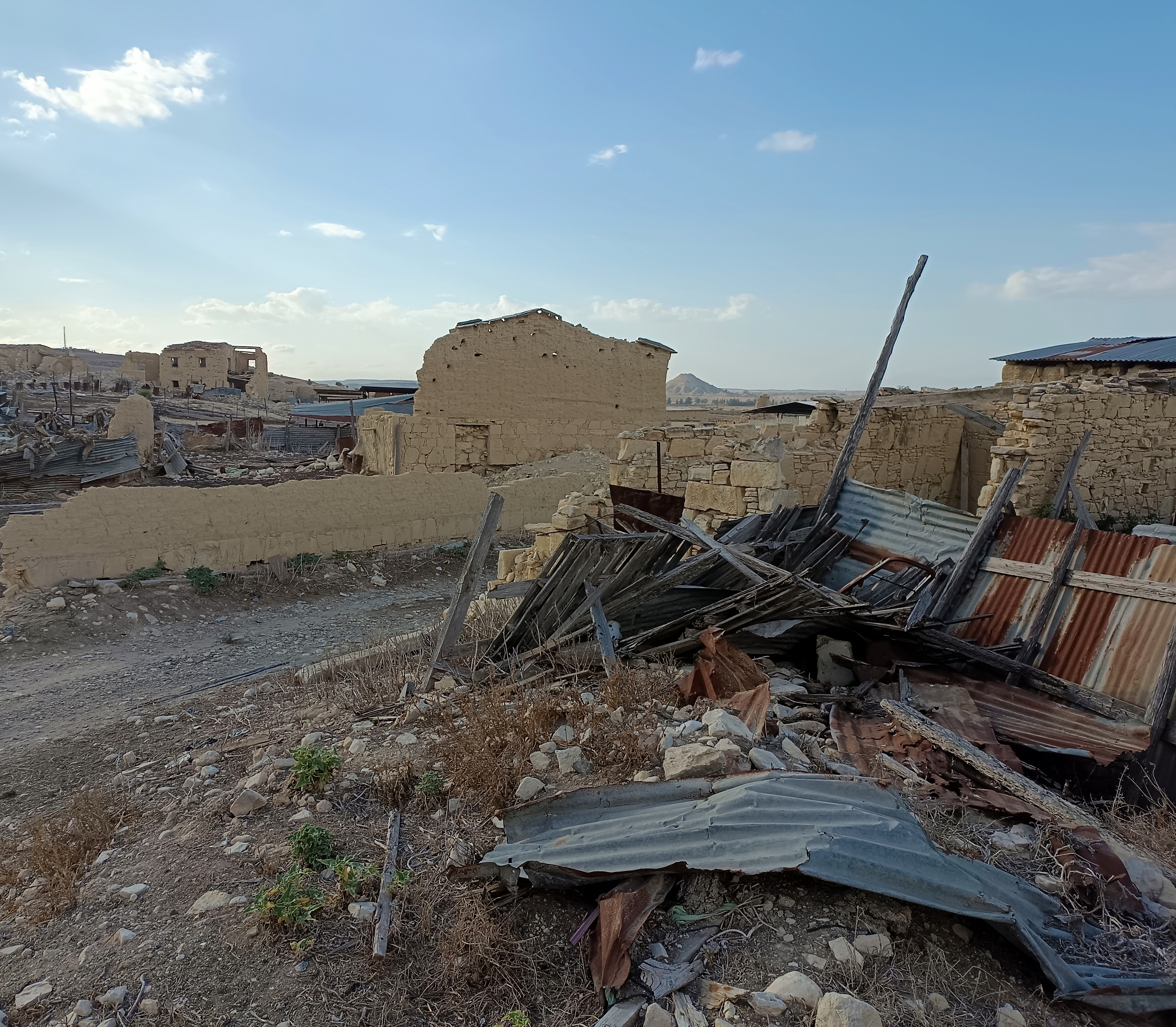
- View of Petrofani

- Location in Cyprus
- Coordinates: 35°2′45″N 33°31′10″E
- Country: Cyprus
- District: Larnaca District
- Time zone: UTC+2 (EET)
  - Summer (DST): UTC+3 (EEST)

Petrofani (Greek: Πετροφάνι; Turkish: Esendağ) is an abandoned village in central Cyprus. It is located in the Larnaca District and is about 2.5 kilometers southwest of Athienou. Petrofani is close to the United Nations Buffer Zone in Cyprus. Prior to the 1974 Turkish invasion of Cyprus, the village was inhabited by Turkish Cypriots.
