= Lageia =

- Village
- Location in Cyprus
- Coordinates: 34°50′32″N 33°14′50″E
- Country: Cyprus
- District: Larnaca District

Population (2011)
  - Total: 28
- Time zone: UTC+2 (EET)
  - Summer (DST): UTC+3 (EEST)

Lageia (Greek: Λάγεια [ˈlaʝa]; Turkish: Laya) is a small village in the Larnaca District of Cyprus, 7 km west of Pano Lefkara. Its population in 2011 was 28.
