= Agioi Vavatsinias =

Agioi Vavatsinias Αγίοι Βαβατσινιάς Ayii Vavatsinias
- Village
- Location in Cyprus
- Coordinates: 34°52′45″N 33°11′30″E
- Country: Cyprus
- District: Larnaca District

Government
  - Type: Community

Population (2011)
  - Total: 131
- Time zone: UTC+2 (EET)
  - Summer (DST): UTC+3 (EEST)

Agioi Vavatsinias (Greek: Αγίοι Βαβατσινιάς) is a village in the Larnaca District of Cyprus, 3 km north of Ora. Its population in 2011 was 131.

Agioi Vavatsinias is the ancestral village of Manos Loïzos, who is considered to be one of the most important Greek Cypriot composers of the 20th century.

To the west of the village, within its administrative bounds, lies the Agioi Vavatsinias dam (built 1981) on the Vasilikos river.
