= Vavatsinia =

- village
- Location in Cyprus
- Coordinates: 34°53′33″N 33°13′44″E
- Country: Cyprus
- District: Larnaca District

Population (2011)
  - Total: 81
- Time zone: UTC+2 (EET)
  - Summer (DST): UTC+3 (EEST)

Vavatsinia (Greek: Βαβατσινιά) is a village in the Larnaca District of Cyprus, east of Agioi Vavatsinias. Its population in 2011 was 81.

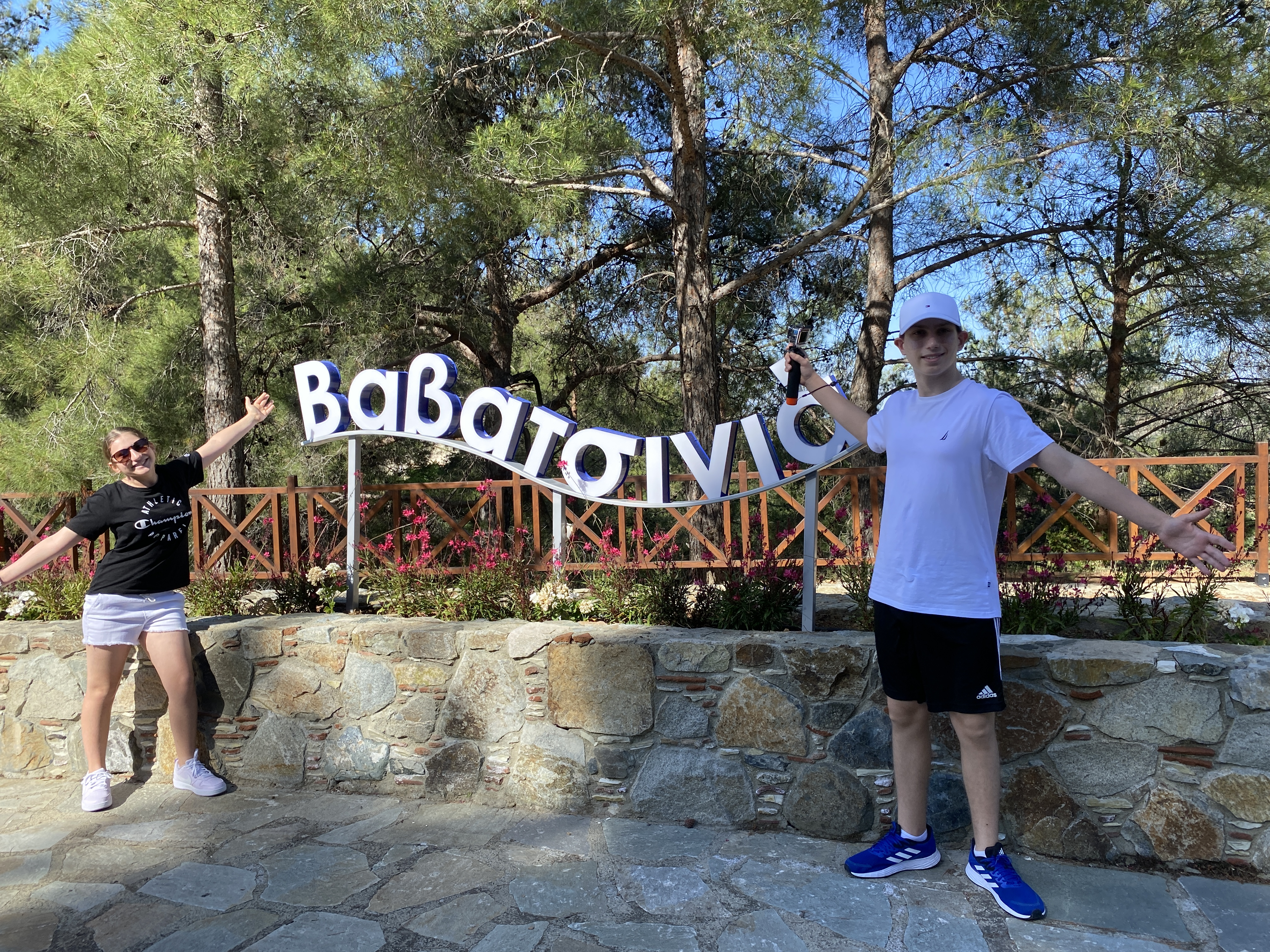
A Sign from the Village of Vavatsinia. 2 Tourist children are next to it.

== Beehive Trail ==
There is a Honeybee trail in Vavatsinia up in the mountains. It is 2.5km long. It has bee-friendly plants signposted along the way, decorative beehives and bee ‘hotels’ that offer refuge for solitary bees. Hexagonal, wooden urban furniture has been installed.

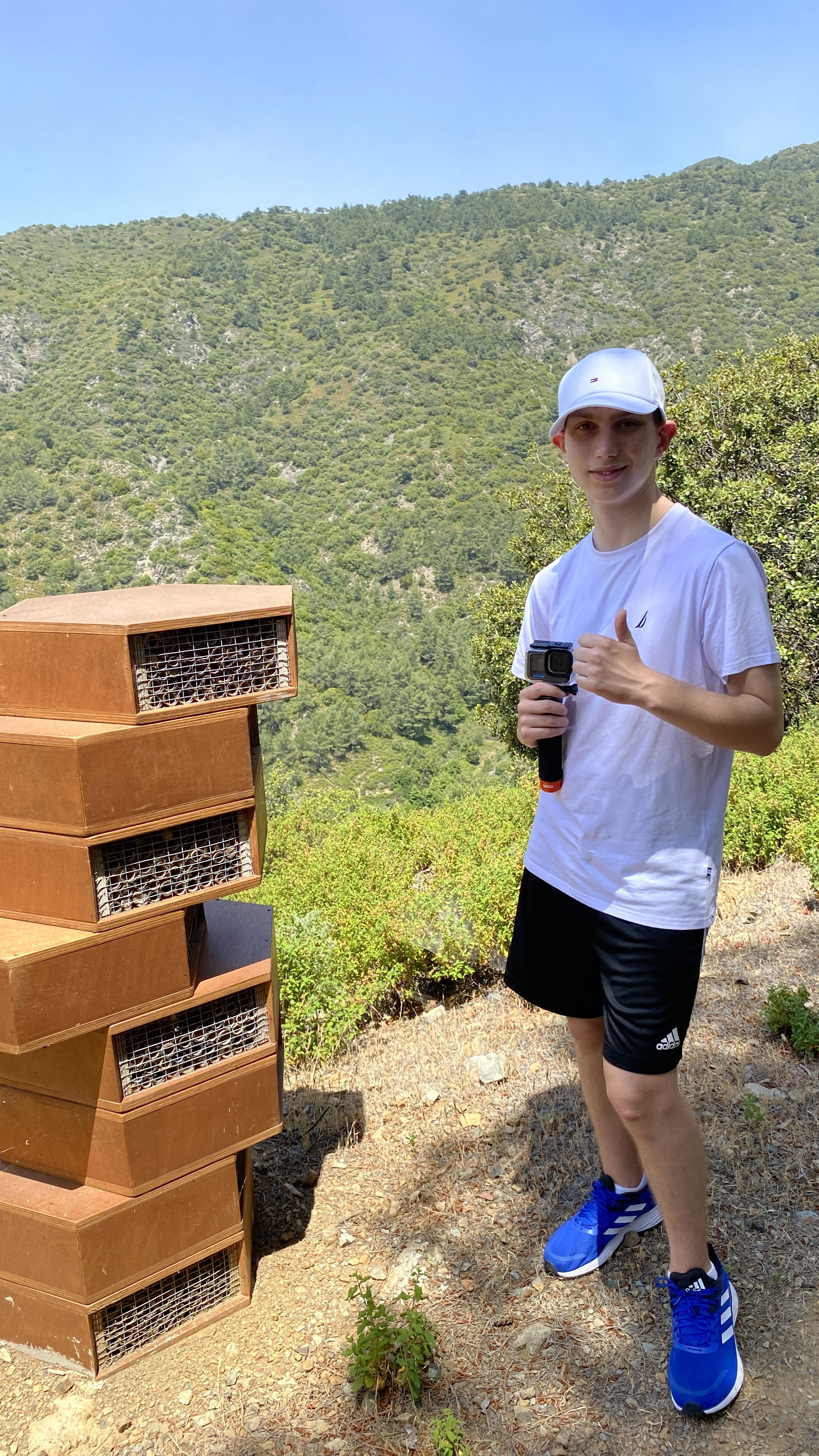
Hexagonal wooden Beehives, a view of the Vavatsinia Mountains and a Tourist Boy next to them.

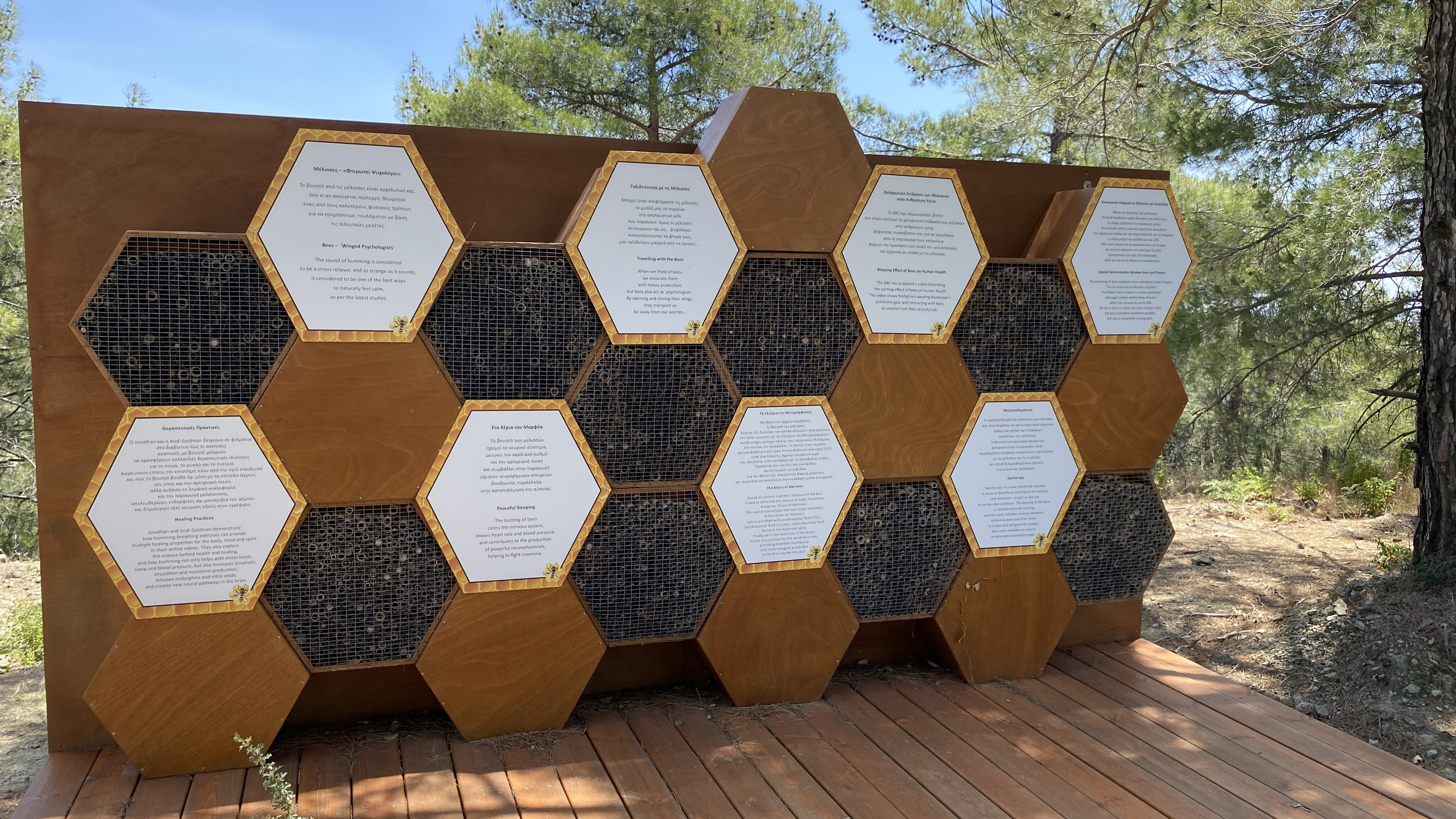
A site at the Vavatsinia Beehive Trail

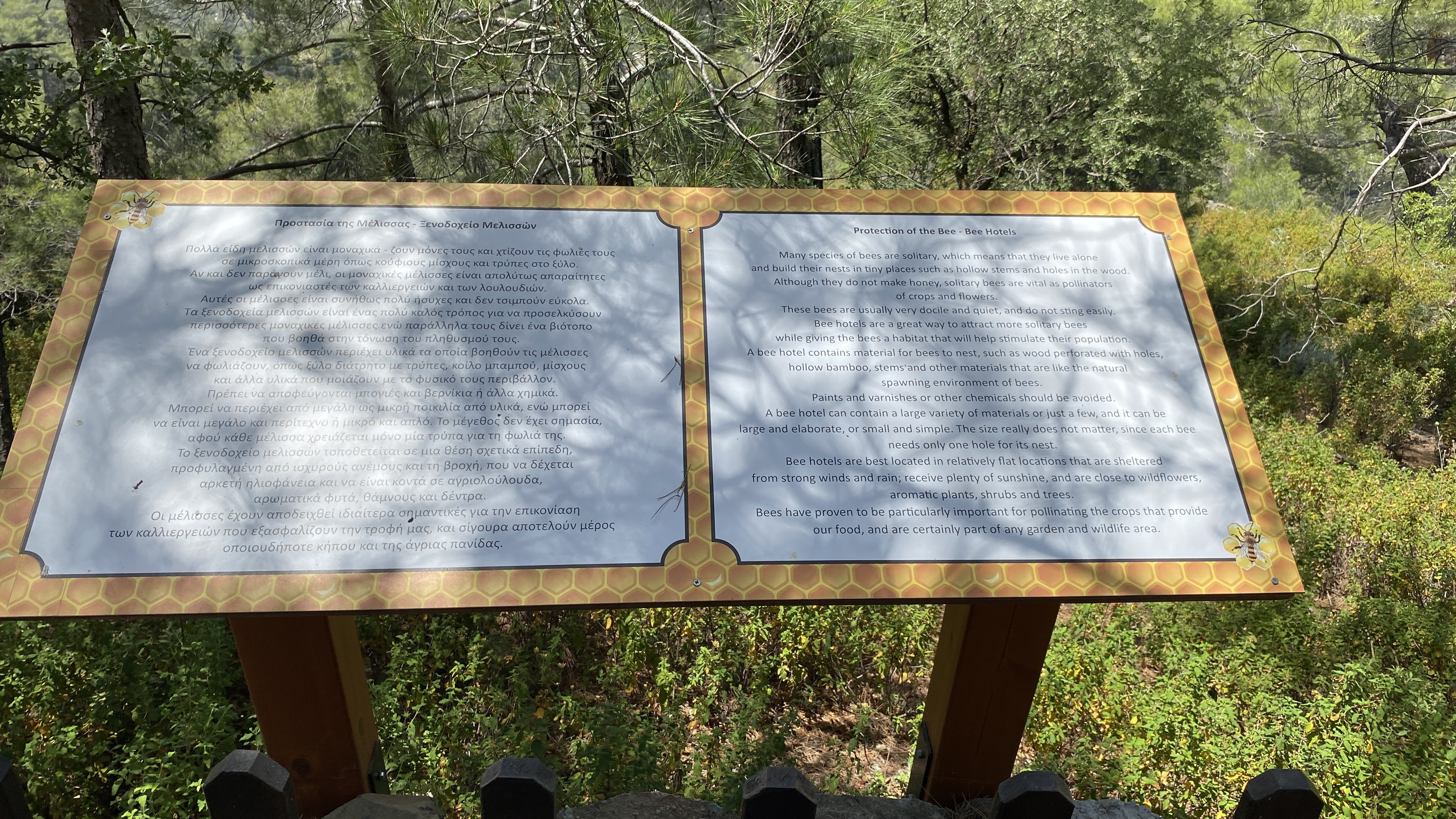
A sign with information at the Vavatsinia Beehive trail.
