= Alaminos, Cyprus =

Alaminos
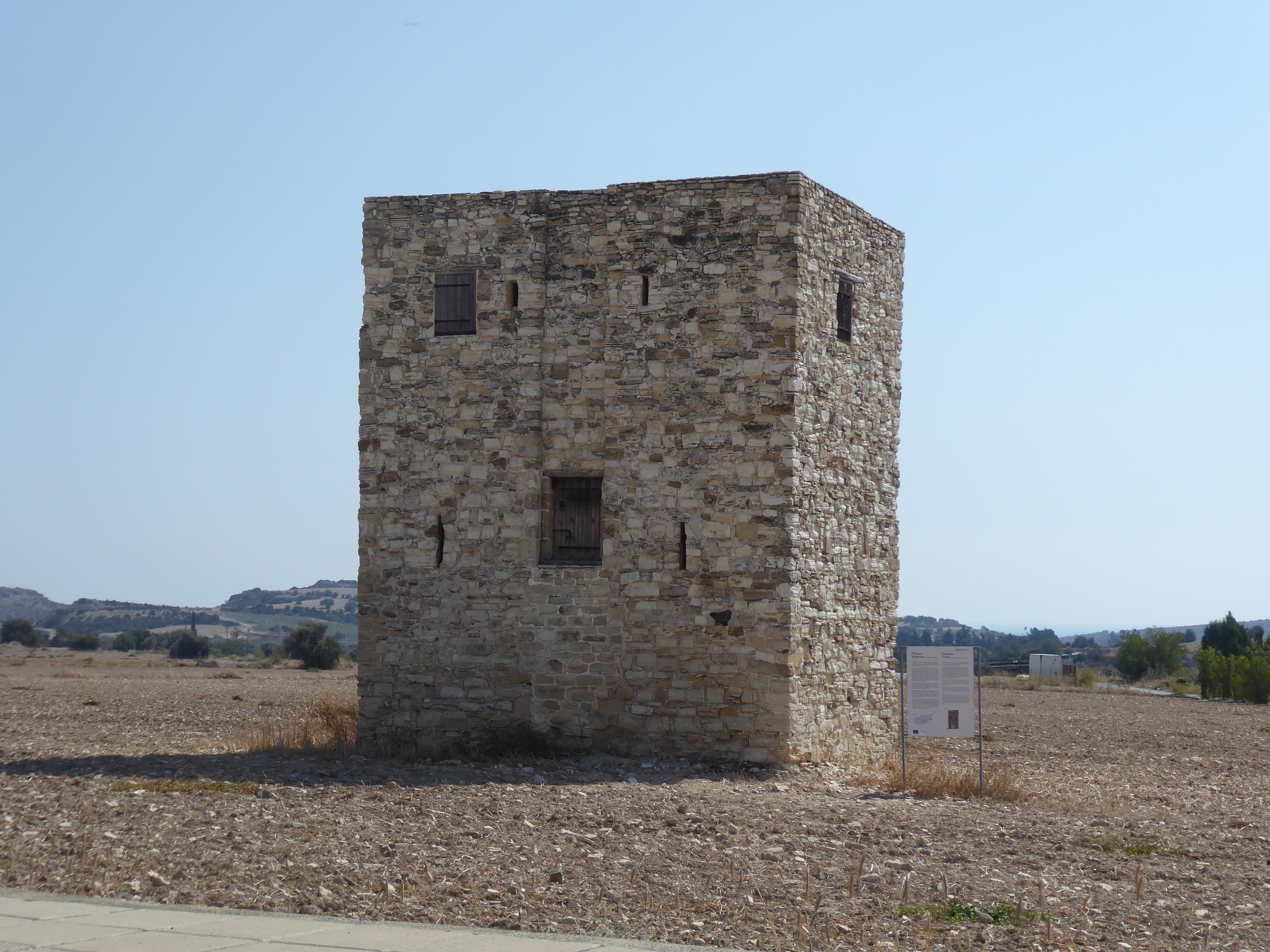
- Alaminos medieval tower

- Location in Cyprus
- Coordinates: 34°48′25″N 33°25′58″E
- Country: Cyprus
- District: Larnaca District

Government
  - Type: Community

Population (2011)
  - Total: 345
- Time zone: UTC+2 (EET)
  - Summer (DST): UTC+3 (EEST)
- Website: http://www.alaminos.org/

Alaminos (Greek: Αλαμινός, Turkish: Aleminyo) is a village in the Larnaca District of Cyprus, west of the city of Larnaca. In 1960, it had 564 inhabitants, with a roughly equal number of Greek and Turkish Cypriots. In 2011, its population was 345.

== History and culture ==
Alaminos is the site of discovery of a Chalcolithic clay feminine "lactation" figurine, with hands pressing breasts. Philip of Ibelin, seneschal of the Kingdom of Cyprus, had an estate at Alaminos, where he was banished in 1308. The area is home to a still-extant coastal watchtower built under Venetian rule. There is also the old Church of Agios Mamas, which was restored in 2006.

In the Middle Ages, Alaminos housed a monastery where the Georgian monks were active. The medieval Georgian hagiographic Life of St. John and Euthymius reports the Byzantine emperor Basil II's unsuccessful attempt to persuade Euthymius the Athonite to take the chair of the deceased archbishop of "Salamino". A monastery operated by the Georgians at Alaminos is also mentioned by the Dominican Stephen de Lusignan, whose chronicle was published in Paris in 1580. The Alexandrian Patriarch Cyprian, a Cypriot, writing in the late 18th century, reiterates that the Georgians once possessed "some Monasteries near Alamino, in the district of Mazoto, Cyprus" and adds that "no representatives of this sect are to be found, however, in the island at the present day." Another important Georgian monastic foundation in Cyprus was the Gialia Monastery, some 149 km (93 mi) northwest of Alaminos.

During the 1974 Turkish invasion of Cyprus, 15 Turkish Cypriot men in Alaminos were massacred by national guardsmen on July 20, in reprisal for the death of the guard unit's commander in a fight with Turkish troops.

In December 2016, an archaeological expedition from Georgia located ruins of a church building and 14 graves, probably dating from the 12th to the 16th century.
