= Avdellero =

- Village
- Location in Cyprus
- Coordinates: 35°0′35″N 33°34′11″E
- Country: Cyprus
- District: Larnaca District

Population (2011)
  - Total: 218
- Time zone: UTC+2 (EET)
  - Summer (DST): UTC+3 (EEST)

Avdellero (Greek: Αβδελλερό [locally [aftelːeˈɾo]]) is a village in the Larnaca District of Cyprus, located 8 km south of Athienou. It has a ridge situated to the North of it which can be flown by Paraglider and Hang glider.
