= Softades =

- Village
- Location in Cyprus
- Coordinates: 34°50′11″N 33°33′3″E
- Country: Cyprus
- District: Larnaca District

Population (2011)
  - Total: 62
- Time zone: UTC+2 (EET)
  - Summer (DST): UTC+3 (EEST)

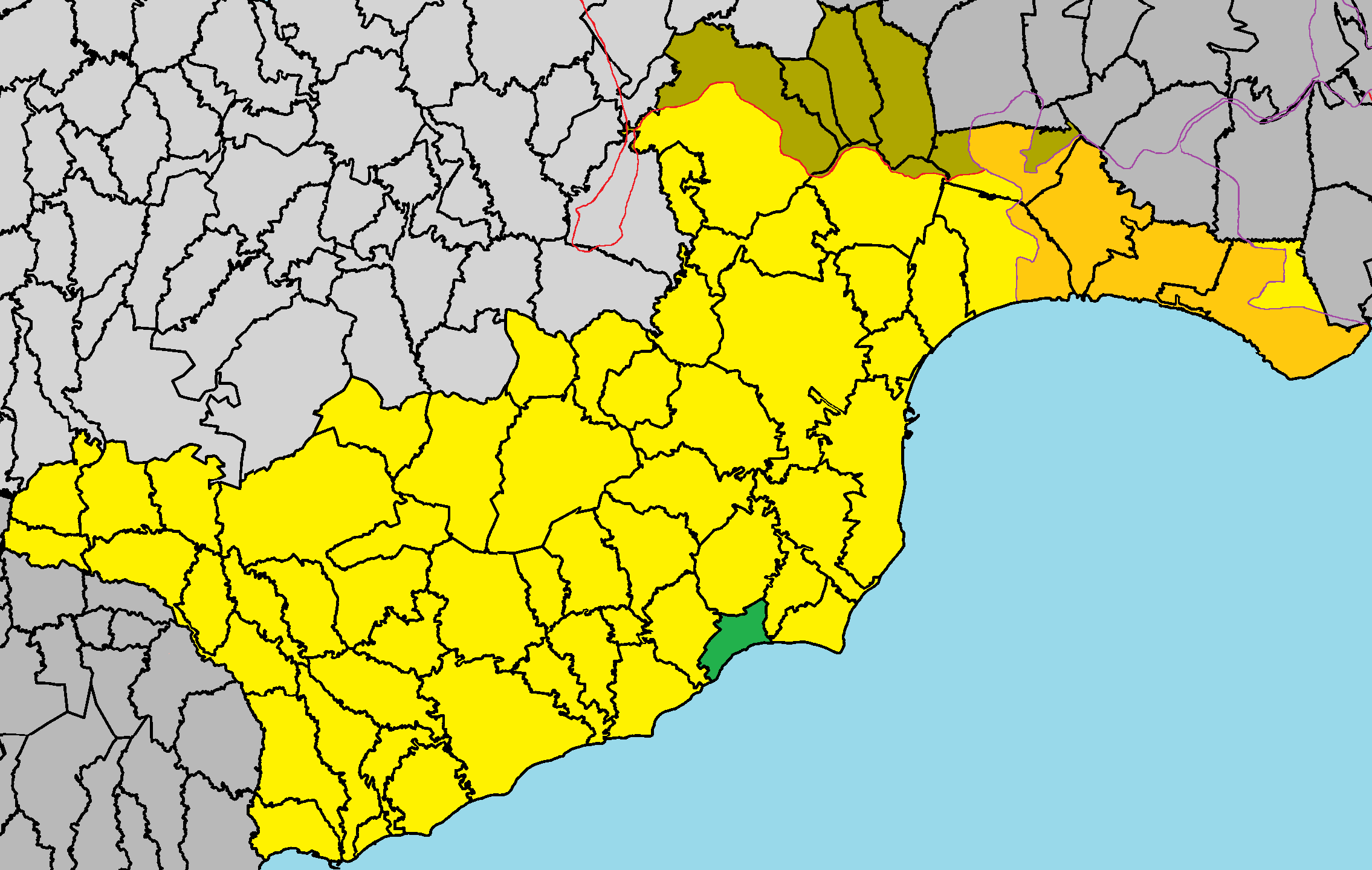
Map of Softades in the Larnaca District

Softades (Greek: Σοφτάδες; Turkish: Softalar) is a village in the Larnaca District of Cyprus, located 3 km west of Kiti. Prior to 1964 the village was inhabited almost exclusively by Turkish Cypriots.
