= Kivisili =

- Location in Cyprus
- Coordinates: 34°50′22″N 33°30′20″E
- Country: Cyprus
- District: Larnaca District

Population (2011)
  - Total: 233

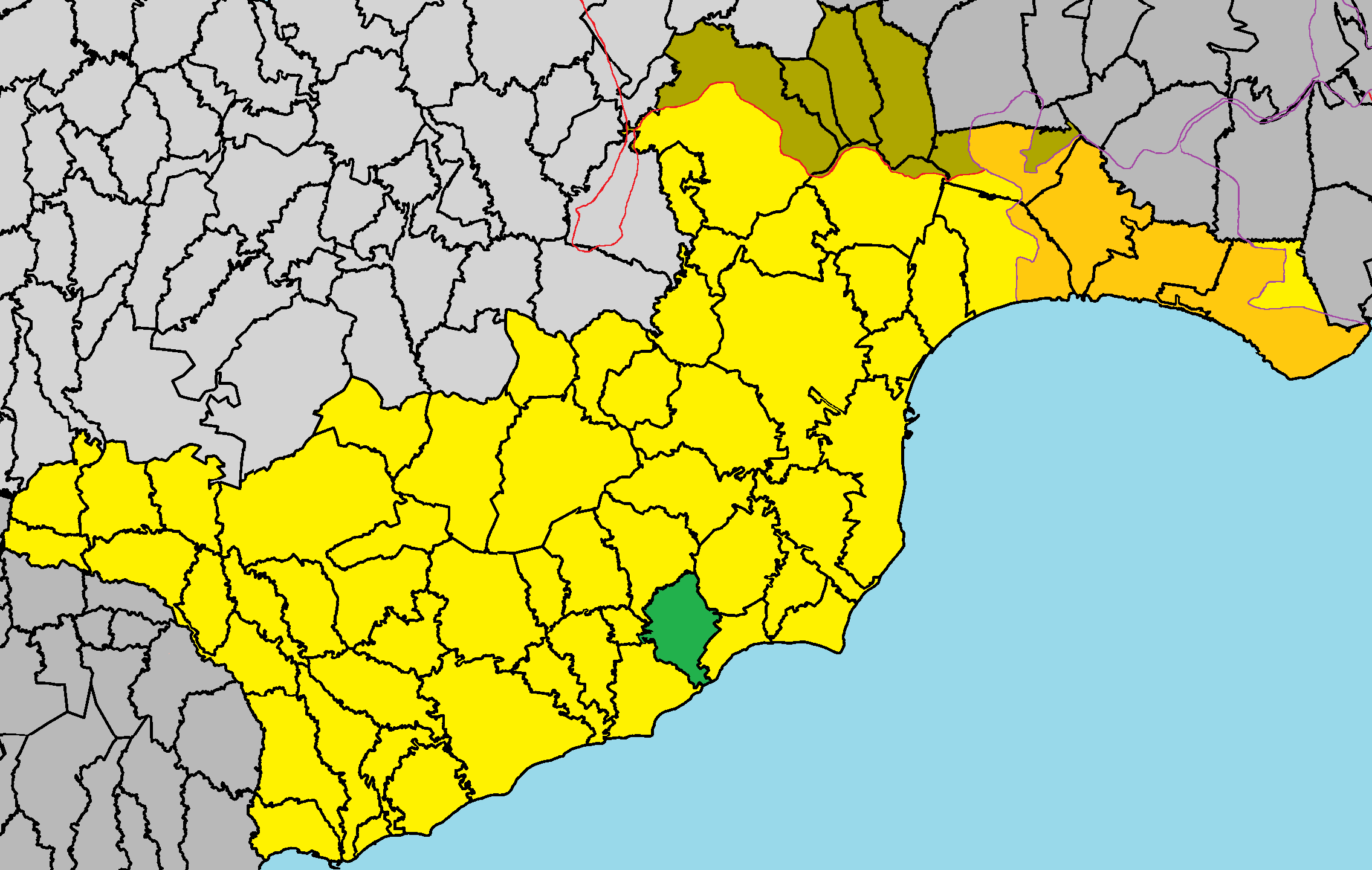
Kivisili (green) in Larnaca District (yellow)

Kivisili (Greek: Κιβισίλι; Turkish: Civisil or Cevizli) is a village in the Larnaca District of Cyprus, located 2 km (1.2 mi) south of Alethriko. Prior to 1974, it was inhabited solely by Turkish Cypriots. As of 2011, Kivisili had a population of 233.
