= Psematismenos =

- Village
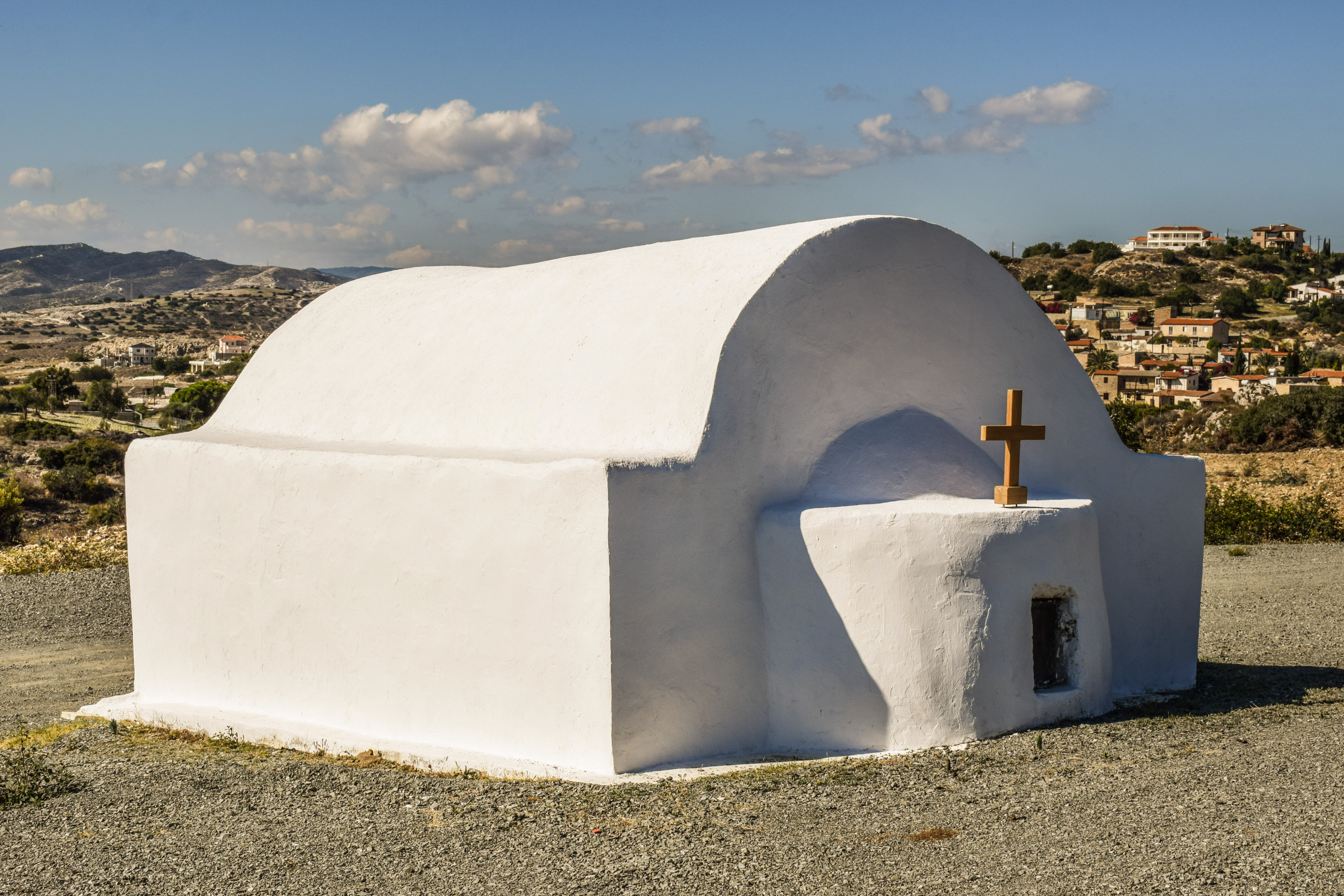

- Location in Cyprus
- Coordinates: 34°45′59″N 33°20′42″E
- Country: Cyprus
- District: Larnaca District

Population (2011)
  - Total: 271
- Time zone: UTC+2 (EET)
  - Summer (DST): UTC+3 (EEST)
- Postal code: 7743
- Area code: 24

Psematismenos (Greek: Ψεματισμένος; Turkish: Yalancıköy) is a village in the Larnaca District of Cyprus, located 2 km northwest of Maroni.

== History ==
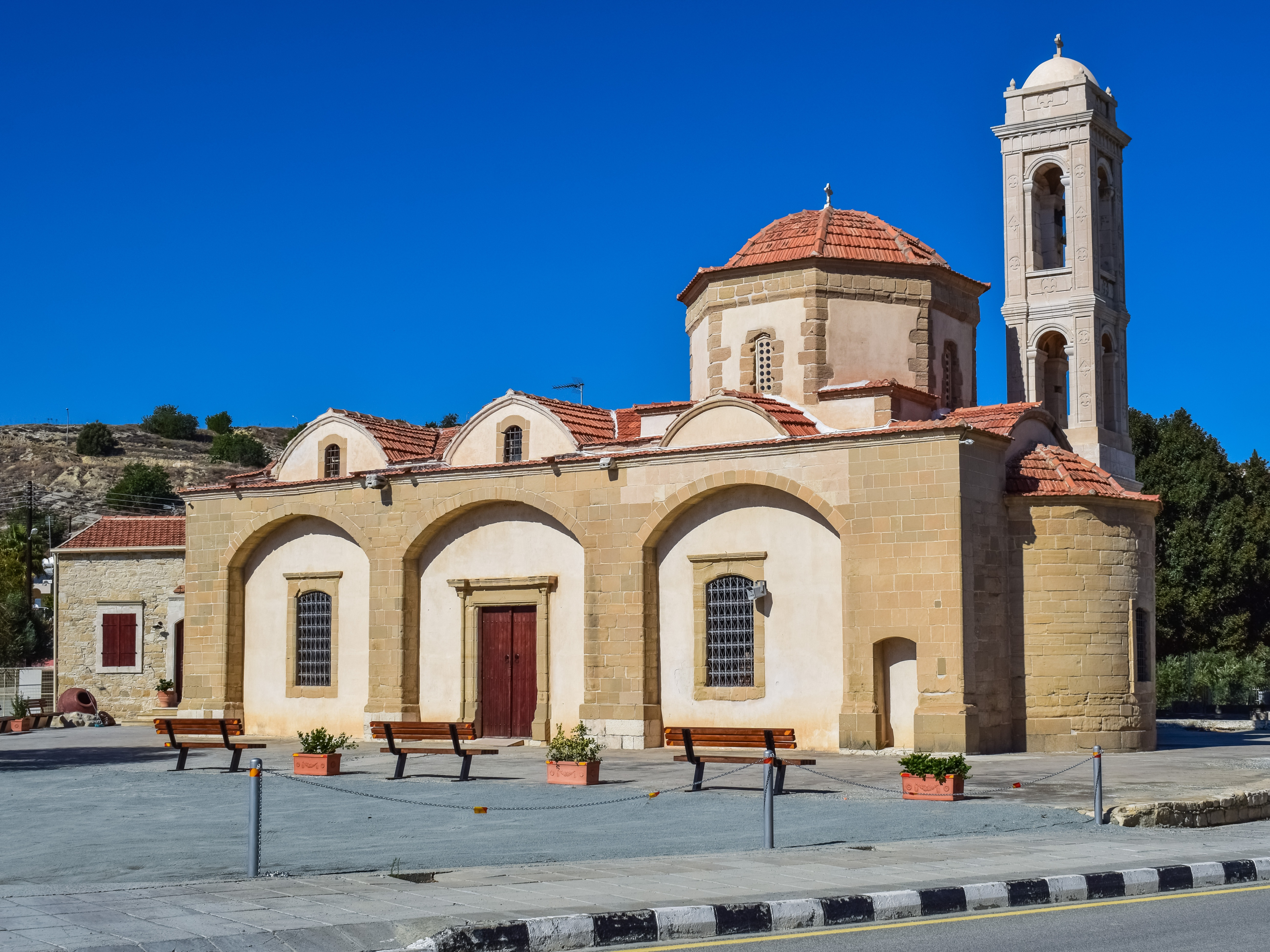

It has been a settlement since Middle Bronze Age.
