= Kochi, Cyprus =

Kochi
- Location within Cyprus
- Coordinates: 34°58′38″N 33°31′08″E
- Country: Cyprus
- District: Larnaca District

Kochi (Greek: (η) Κόση, romanized: Kosi [locally [ˈkʰoʃːi]]; Turkish: Goşşi or Üçşehitler) is an abandoned village in the Larnaca District of Cyprus, about 15 km north-west of Larnaca. It was originally inhabited exclusively by Turkish Cypriots. Nearly all of them were displaced during the 1974 Turkish invasion; most resettled in Exometochi. In 1973, it had an estimated population of 244. It is now the location of a Greek-Cypriot army camp.
