= Kalo Chorio, Larnaca =

Kalo Chorio
- Village
- Location in Cyprus
- Coordinates: 34°55′44″N 33°32′11″E
- Country: Cyprus
- District: Larnaca District

Population (2011)
  - Total: 1,518
- Time zone: UTC+2 (EET)
  - Summer (DST): UTC+3 (EEST)

Kalo Chorio Larnakas (Greek: Καλό Χωριό Λάρνακας, literally 'Good Village'; Turkish: Vuda) is a village located in the Larnaca District of Cyprus, 10 km west of the town of Larnaca. Prior to 1974, the majority of the village consisted of Turkish Cypriots.
