= Larnaca District =

District of Cyprus

Larnaca District Επαρχία Λάρνακας (Greek) Larnaka Kazası (Turkish)
- District
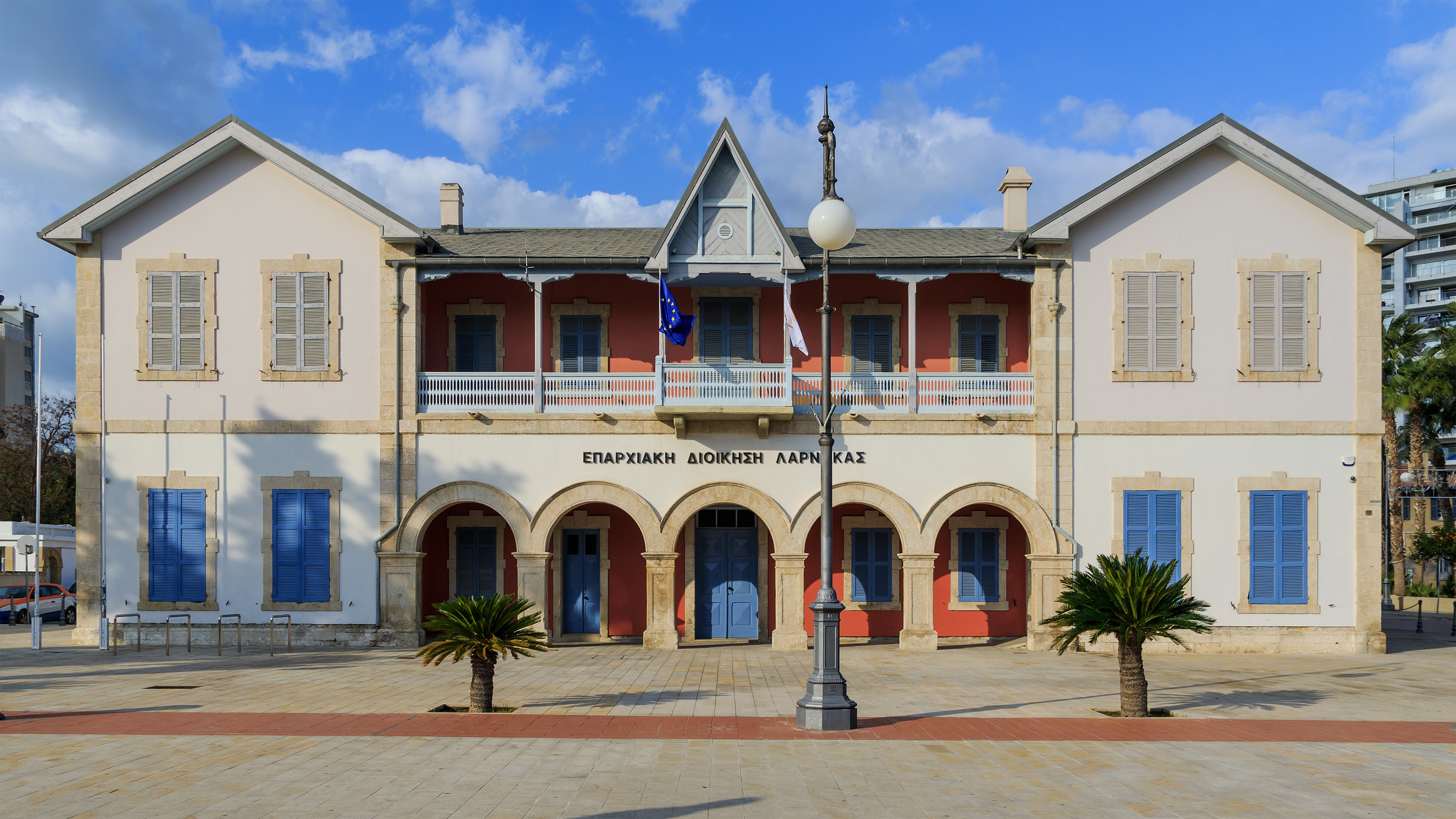
- The Larnaca District Administration Building in 2017

- Location of the district in Cyprus
- Coordinates: 34°53′N 33°28′E
- Country: Cyprus
- Capital: Larnaca

Area
  - District: 1,120.1 km^{2} (432.5 sq mi)
- (Note: Including de facto Northern Cyprus, the UN buffer zone and Dhekelia.)

Population (2021)
  - District: 155,753
  - Rank: 3rd
  - Density: 139.05/km^{2} (360.15/sq mi)
  - Urban: 51,468 (2,015)
- Time zone: UTC+2 (EET)
  - Summer (DST): UTC+3 (EEST)
- Post codes: 6000–7999
- Area code: +357 24
- ISO 3166 code: CY-03

The Larnaca District, (Note: Greek: Επαρχία Λάρνακας, romanized: Eparchía Lárnakas [/éparxía lárnakas/]; Turkish: Larnaka Kazası) or simply Larnaca (also Larnaka), (Note: /ˈlɑːrnəkə/; Greek: Λάρνακα, romanized: Lárnaka [ˈlarnaka]; Turkish: Larnaka) is one of the six districts of Cyprus. Its capital is Larnaca. It is bordered on the east by Famagusta District, on the north by Nicosia District and on the west by Limassol District.

A small part of the district was occupied by the Turkish army in 1974, and most of the occupied part is now de facto administered as part of Northern Cyprus's Lefkoşa District, with the remaining area near Pergamos being de facto administered by the Gazimağusa District.

The communities of Melouseia, Tremetousia and Arsos lie in the occupied zone, while the municipal/community areas of Athienou, Troulloi and Pergamos are partially occupied.

Located in the district are Larnaca International Airport, the island's primary airport, and the Hala Sultan Tekke and the towns of Larnaca, Aradippou, Athienou and Lefkara.

In 2021, Larnaca District had a population of 155,753, of which 58.1% was urban.

== History ==
Larnaca District 1878

Larnaca's name was given by the tomb of Snt Lazarus. The first Bishop of the City of Larnaca ( formerly known as ancient Kition an Achaean City later under Athenian alliance ). Larnaca actually means tomb in Greek. Larnaca (Kition) is the birth place for the ancient philosopher Zenon, and the place of origin of Olympia (Aphrodite's priest) mother of king Alexander the Great. ( Makkabies A 1 "land Hettiem (Kition)". Also known for the Sea battle of Athenian General Kimon, who, despite his death in the battle, he won. This was the reason of becoming the logo for Larnaca based Army under the topic " Won even dead". Larnaca carries a great history and was also one of the Cypriot cities which provided the navy for Alexander the Great. ( The only battle G. Alexander used navy was the battle for Tyros having as Admiral a Cypriot, the one who gave him his sword to cut the Gordian knot.)

During Turkish rule, Larnaca was one of the six cazas into which the island was divided. Cazas were subdivided into nahiehs, but in the case of Larnaca there was only one, which was coterminous with the caza.

The caza was headed by a Kaimakan. When the British took control of Cyprus in 1878, these administrative units were retained. A British officer styled a Commissioner (later District Officer) was appointed for the caza of Larnaca, while the Turkish Kaimakan was initially retained with certain of his functions.

Some northern parts of the present District were at that time included in Famagusta District, namely Arsos, Athienou, Melousia, Troulli, Tremetousia and Pergamos. At the first British Census Larnaca District (i.e. both the caza and nahieh) had a population of 20,766. By 1891 Athienou had been moved to Nicosia District, while the other villages were later moved to Larnaca District. Athienou was united to Larnaca District in the 1920s.

== Settlements ==
According to Statistical Codes of Municipalities, Communities and Quarters of Cyprus per the Statistical Service of Cyprus (2015), Larnaca District has 6 municipalities and 53 communities. Municipalities are written with bold.

- Agia Anna
- Agioi Vavatsinias
- Agios Theodoros
- Alaminos
- Alethriko
- Anafotia
- Anglisides
- Aplanta
- Aradippou
- Arsos
- Athienou
- Avdellero
- Choirokoitia
- Delikipos
- Dromolaxia–Meneou
- Goşşi
- Kalavasos
- Kalo Chorio
- Kato Drys
- Kato Lefkara
- Kellia
- Kiti
- Kivisili
- Klavdia
- Kofinou
- Kornos
- Lageia
- Larnaca
- Livadia
- Mari
- Maroni
- Mazotos
- Melini
- Melouseia
- Menogeia
- Mosfiloti
- Odou
- Ora
- Ormideia
- Oroklini
- Pano Lefkara
- Pergamos
- Pervolia
- Petrofani
- Psematismenos
- Psevdas
- Pyla
- Pyrga
- Skarinou
- Softades
- Tersefanou
- Tochni
- Tremetousia
- Troulloi
- Vavatsinia
- Vavla
- Xylofagou
- Xylotymbou
- Zygi
