= Alethriko =

- Village
- Location in Cyprus
- Coordinates: 34°51′34″N 33°29′39″E
- Country: Cyprus
- District: Larnaca District

Government
  - Type: Community

Population (2011)
  - Total: 1,101
- Time zone: UTC+2 (EET)
  - Summer (DST): UTC+3 (EEST)
- Website: www.alethriko.com.cy

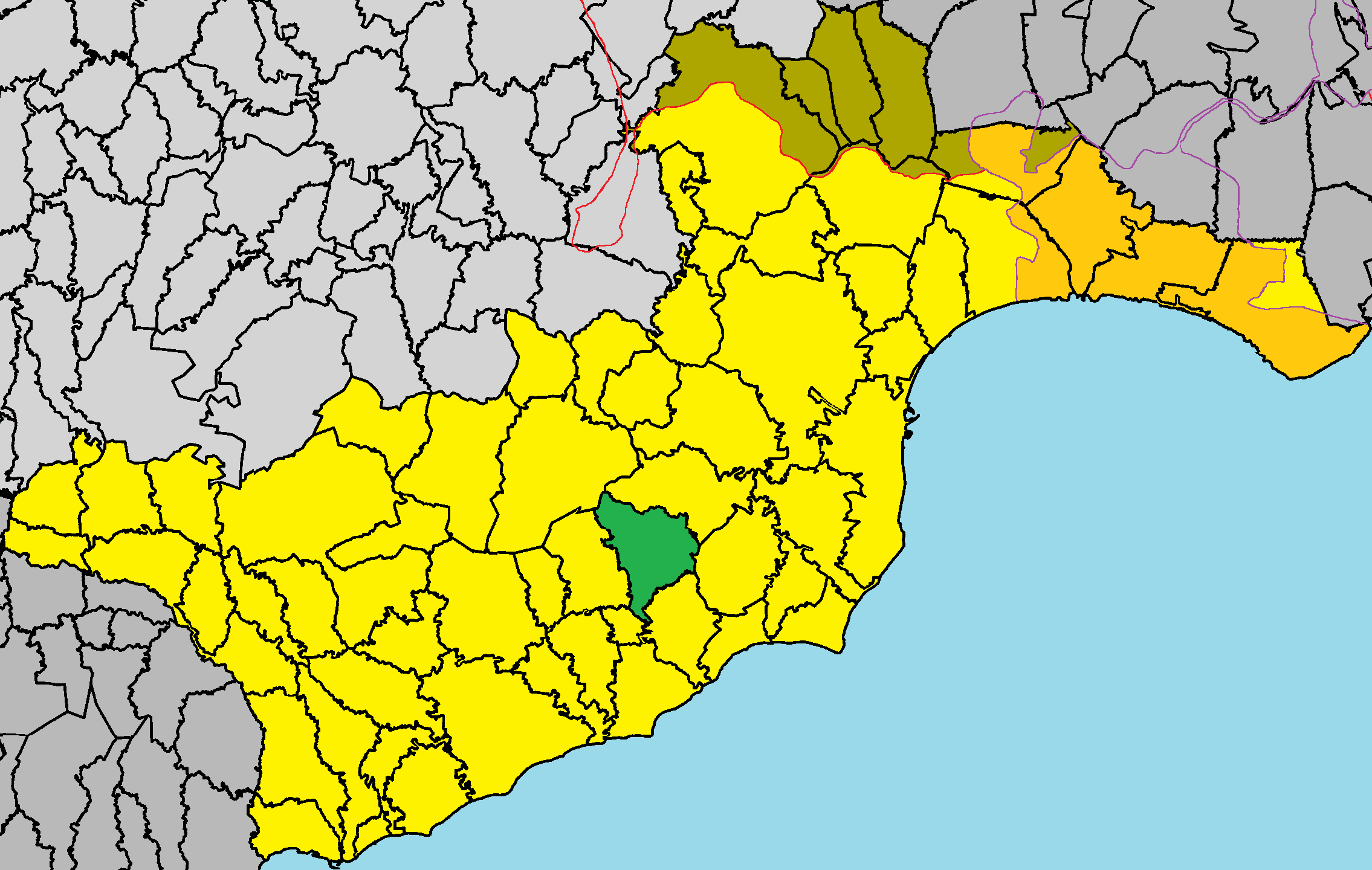
Alethriko in Larnaca District.

Alethriko (Greek: Αλεθρικό; Turkish: Aletriko) is a village in the Larnaca District of Cyprus, west of Larnaca. The first known census was carried out under Ottoman Rule in 1831; it listed only males: there were 46 Greek Cypriots and 18 Turkish Cypriots. In the census of 1891 the population of Alethriko was recorded as 37 Turkish Cypriots and 233 Greek Cypriots of both sexes. In 2011 its population was 1,101.
