= Kornos, Cyprus =

Kornos Kόρνος
- Location in Cyprus
- Coordinates: 34°55′18″N 33°23′44″E
- Country: Cyprus
- District: Larnaca District

Population (2011)
  - Total: 2,083
- Time zone: UTC+2 (EET)
  - Summer (DST): UTC+3 (EEST)
- Website: www.kornos.org

Kornos (Greek: Kόρνος) is a village located in the Larnaca District of Cyprus, 27 kilometres west of the city of Larnaca and 25 kilometres south-west of Nicosia.
