= Mosfiloti =

Mosphiloti
- Μοσφιλωτή (Greek), Mosfiloti (Turkish)
- Location in Cyprus
- Coordinates: 34°57′7″N 33°25′29″E
- Country: Cyprus
- District: Larnaca District
- Elevation: 820 ft (250 m)

Population (2001)
  - Total: 1,110
- Time zone: UTC+2 (EET)
  - Summer (DST): UTC+3 (EEST)
- Postal code: 7647
- Website: www.mosfiloti.org

Mosfiloti (Greek: Μοσφιλωτή, Turkish: Mosfiloti) is a village located in the Larnaca District of Cyprus. The village is named after the Mosfilo, a variety of White Hawthorn making a delicious jelly, which grows abundantly in the region.

It is essentially a large rural community with pine-covered hills on either side of a valley at an altitude of about 250 m. The population is about 1500 (2009) because of an influx of both Cypriot and foreign residents over the past few years. Communications are easy with motorway connections to Nicosia (25 minutes) and Limassol (40 minutes) and an ordinary road to Larnaca and Larnaca airport (20 minutes).

Historically, the earliest references are to the Ayia Thekla monastery, currently under the Archbishopric and run by an order of nuns. It has a source reputed for curing skin diseases. It was reputedly founded by Saint Helena. The old Ayia Marina church is probably 16th century, with a new one dedicated to the same saint. There is also a chapel commemorating the victims of the Helios air crash in Greece, two of whom were respected inhabitants of the village, owning a supermarket.

The village is dotted with a variety of retail commerces, public establishments and a restaurant noted for traditional food at reasonable prices.

Mosfiloti also houses a unique museum: "The Temple of Michel Platini", dedicated to the famous French football player. Held by Philippos Stavrou "Platini", a former footballer himself, the museum currently holds two Guinness records for biggest number of sport artefacts and biggest number of artefacts regarding football.
