= Skarinou =

- Village
- Σκαρίνου (Greek)
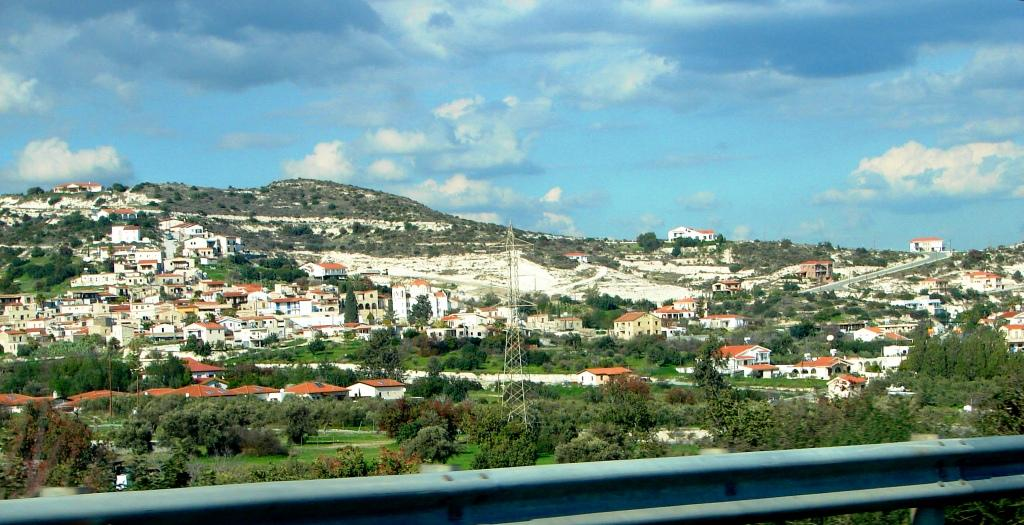

- Location in Cyprus
- Coordinates: 34°49′16″N 33°21′21″E
- Country: Cyprus
- District: Larnaca District

Population (2001)
  - Total: 238
- Time zone: UTC+2 (EET)
  - Summer (DST): UTC+3 (EEST)

Skarinou (Greek: Σκαρίνου, Turkish: Iskarinu) is a village in the Larnaca District of Cyprus, located 4 km west of Kofinou.

The Skarinou Community Council Website includes a history of the village, and local community and business information.
