= Klavdia =

- Village
- Location in Cyprus
- Coordinates: 34°53′32″N 33°30′53″E
- Country: Cyprus
- District: Larnaca District

Population (2011)
  - Total: 427

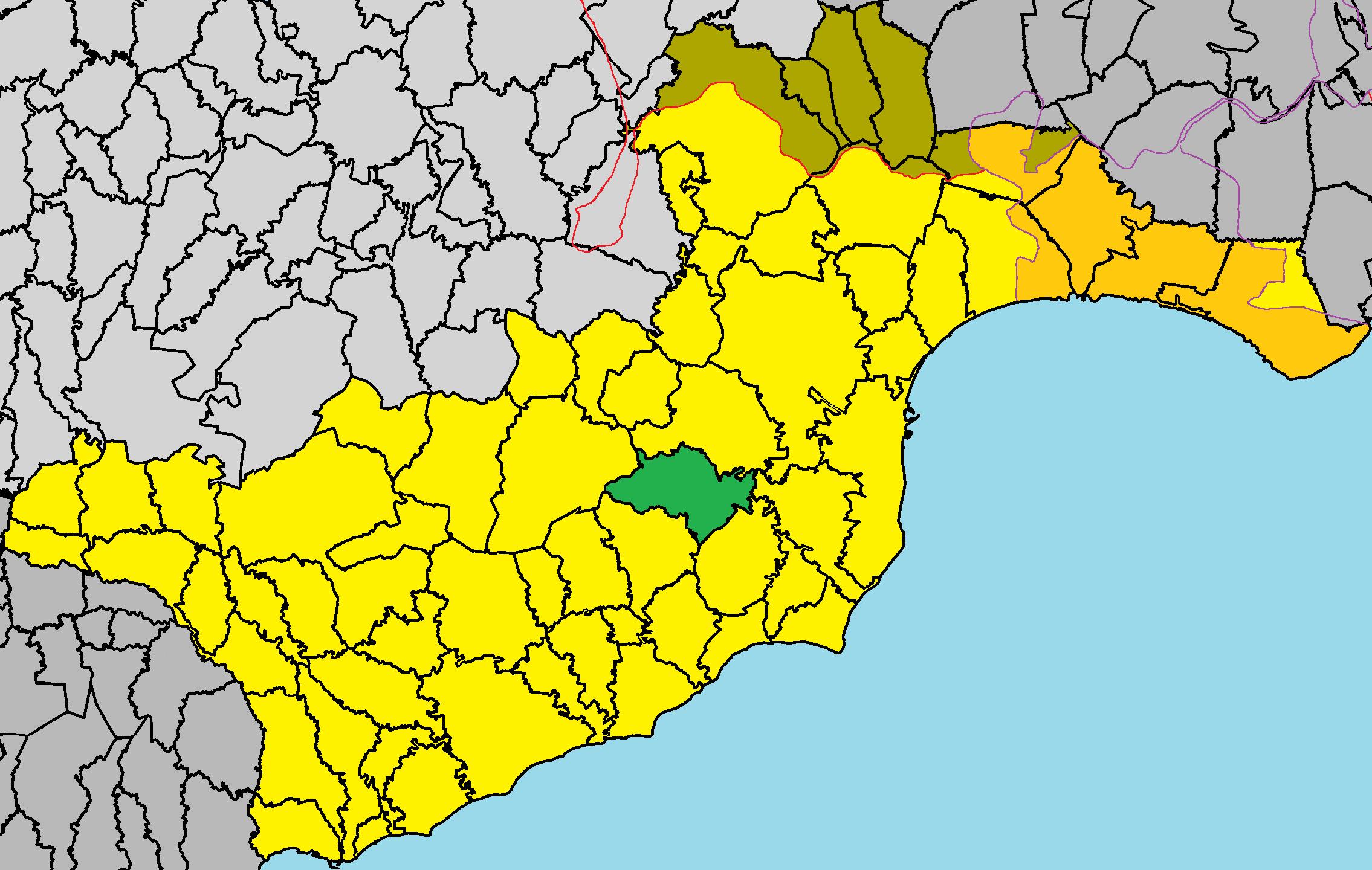
Klavdia in Larnaca District

Klavdia (Greek: Κλαυδιά; Turkish: Klavya or Alaniçi) is a village in the Larnaca District of Cyprus, located 10 km (6.2 mi) west of Larnaca. Prior to the 1974 Turkish Invasion of Cyprus and consequent displacement, the village was inhabited solely by Turkish Cypriots.
