= 1491 Cyprus earthquake =

Coordinates: 35.148°N 34.527°E

The 1491 Cyprus earthquake occurred on 24 April 1491, and resulted in extensive damage across the island of Cyprus and some limited damage in the Levant.

== Epicentre and geology ==
The precise epicenter of the earthquake remains unknown. Nicholas Ambraseys wrote that the epicenter was probably located in the Eastern Mediterranean Sea between the coasts of Cyprus and Syria. Papazachos and Papaioannou, on the other hand, state that the 1491 earthquake is only one of the two earthquakes (the other being in 1718) that had an epicentre within the island of Cyprus, and this was most likely in the Mesaoria plain. They state that the plain may constitute a graben that is associated with normal faults, which would have produced the earthquake.

According to the Cyprus Geological Survey Department, the earthquake had a magnitude of 7.0 on the Richter scale and an intensity of VIII-IX on the Mercalli scale.

== Damage ==
The earthquake caused widespread damage particularly along the eastern coast of Cyprus as well as the Mesaoria plain, including the capital city of Nicosia. In 'badly-built' city of Nicosia, chroniclers state that 4,000 buildings were destroyed during the earthquake. The primary sources disagree on the loss of life in the city, with some stating that there was no loss of life, but another source stating that 1,000 people died.
