= Kato Lefkara =

Kato Lefkara Κάτω Λεύκαρα
- Village
- Location in Cyprus
- Coordinates: 34°51′44″N 33°19′0″E
- Country: Cyprus
- District: Larnaca District

Government
  - Type: Community

Population (2011)
  - Total: 128
- Time zone: UTC+2 (EET)
  - Summer (DST): UTC+3 (EEST)

Kato Lefkara (Greek: Κάτω Λεύκαρα) is a village in the Larnaca District of Cyprus. Its population in 2011 was 128.
