= Mazotos =

Mazotos Μαζωτός
- Location in Cyprus
- Coordinates: 34°48′8″N 33°29′24″E
- Country: Cyprus
- District: Larnaca District

Population (2001)
  - Total: 784
- Time zone: UTC+2 (EET)
  - Summer (DST): UTC+3 (EEST)

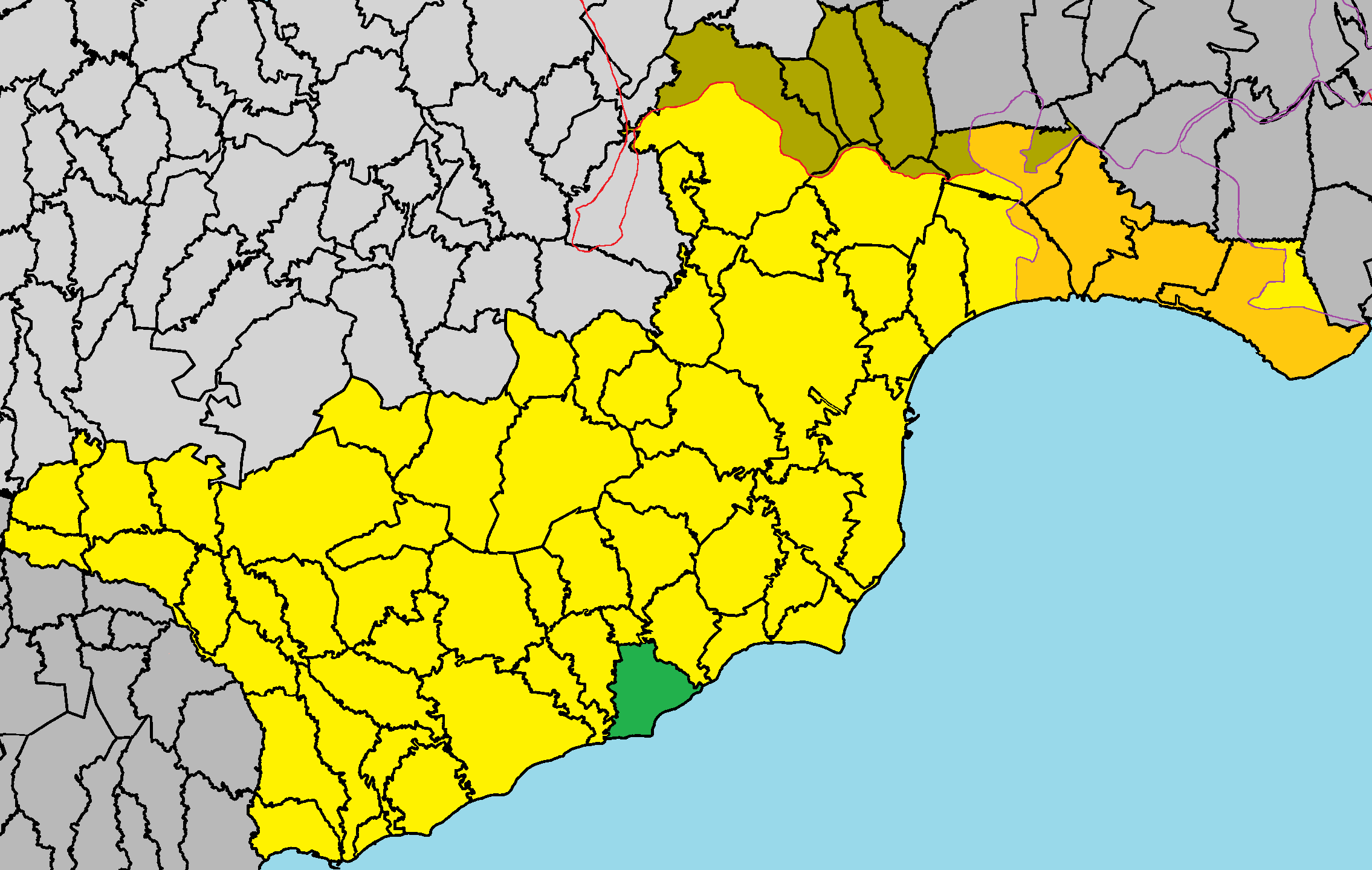
Mazotos, Larnaca District.

Mazotos (Greek: Μαζωτός, Italian: Mazotto) is a village 22 km away from Larnaca in Cyprus, close to the sea.

The community today numbers about 1,200 predominantly Greek speaking Cypriots but with about 350 expatriates who are here on a permanent basis as retirees. In addition the village can accommodate a further 2,500 in 'holiday homes'.
