= Choirokoitia (village) =

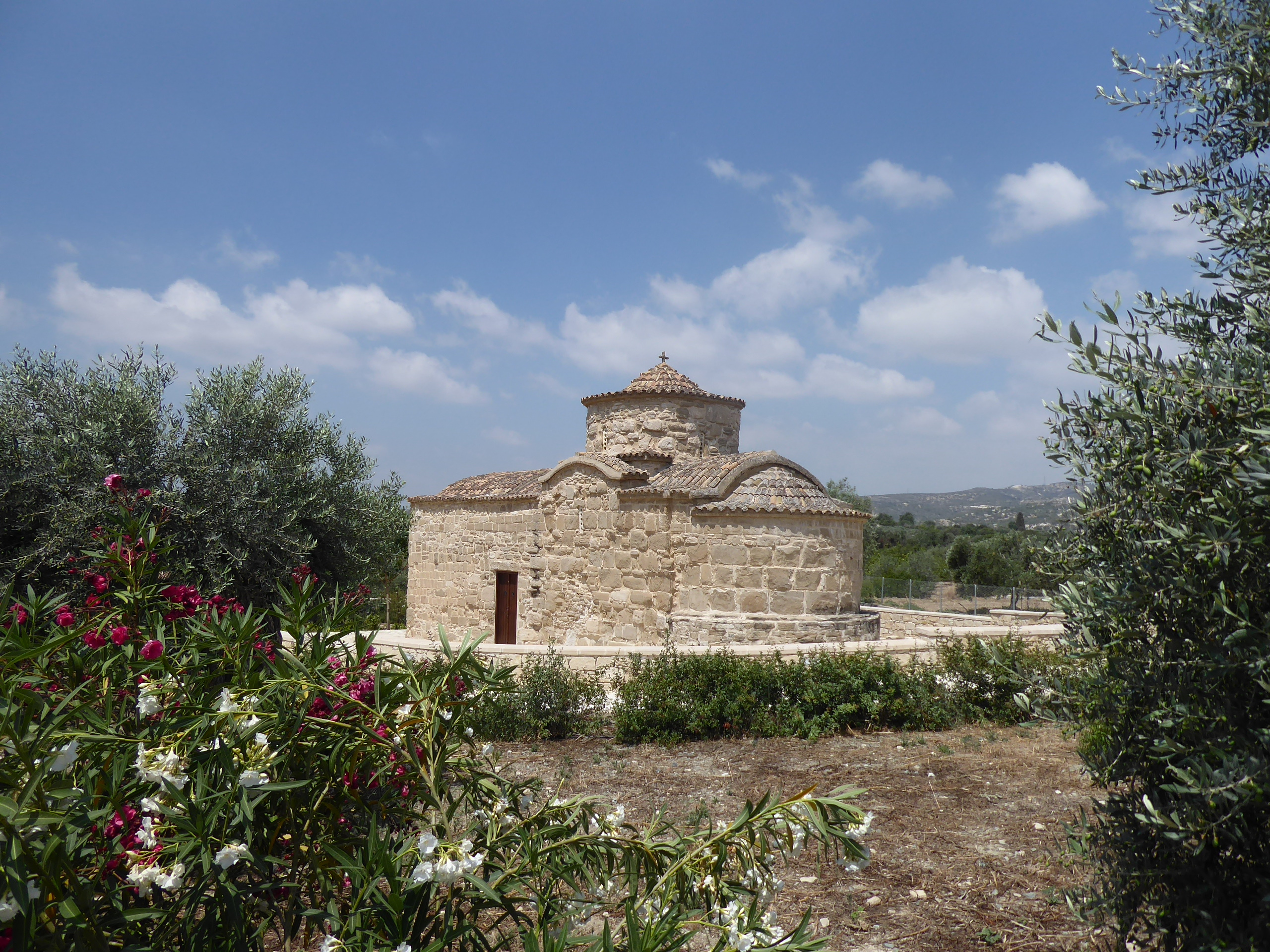
- Panagia tou Kampou, Choirokoitia

- Location in Cyprus
- Coordinates: 34°47′47″N 33°20′11″E
- Country: Cyprus
- District: Larnaca District

Population (2011)
  - Total: 632
- Time zone: UTC+2 (EET)
  - Summer (DST): UTC+3 (EEST)

Choirokoitia (Greek: Χοιροκοιτία; Turkish: Şirokitya) is a village in the Larnaca District of Cyprus, located 2 km north of Tochni, near the UN World Heritage Site of Choirokoitia.
