= Anglisides =

- village
- Location in Cyprus
- Coordinates: 34°51′10″N 33°27′22″E
- Country: Cyprus
- District: Larnaca District

Population (2011)
  - Total: 1,146
- Time zone: UTC+2 (EET)
  - Summer (DST): UTC+3 (EEST)
- Postal code: 7571

Anglisides (Greek: Αγγλισίδες) is a village in the Larnaca District of Cyprus, located 4 km north of Anafotida and 20 km southwest of Larnaca.

== History ==
Anglisides was a mixed village from at least the Ottoman period, with the population roughly split evenly between Greek and Turkish Cypriots in 1831. During the British colonial era, the Greek Cypriot population grew significantly while the Turkish Cypriot population stagnated.
