= Anafotia =

- Village
- Location in Cyprus
- Coordinates: 34°49′26″N 33°27′49″E
- Country: Cyprus
- District: Larnaca District

Population (2011)
  - Total: 790
- Time zone: UTC+2 (EET)
  - Summer (DST): UTC+3 (EEST)
- Website: www.anafotia.org

Anafotia (Greek: Aναφωτιά or Αναφωτία; Turkish: Akkor) is a village located in the Larnaca District of Cyprus, west of Larnaca. In 1994, the official name of the village became Anafotida (Aναφωτίδα), following a decision by the then-government of Cyprus to make the names of villages on the island more Greek. However, locally the village is still referred to as Anafotia.

The naming of the village, according to The Great Cyprus Encyclopaedia, derived either from the name “Agia Foteini” or “Fotou,” the latter meaning 'light' There is some evidence to suggest the name is derived from the Greek word for light, or fire, fotia, (φωτιά) as the Turkish name for the village, Akkor, translates into English as meaning 'incandescent'.

Anafotia is mainly agricultural, with tomatoes being a dominant crop. The village centre is small, but there are a number of cafes, a branch of the Co-operative Bank and four churches. The original church is dedicated to St Photeine. A new church was begun in the 1930s dedicated to St Dimitrianos. In his 1936 book Historic Cyprus the British colonial officer Rupert Gunnis thought the new church was so badly constructed it 'may well fall down', a prediction that came true twenty years later.

In his book Strolling around Cyprus: Larnaka, City and District, Giorgos Karouzis wrote: 'While strolling along Anafotia, one mainly gets to see cultivated expanses of land. In particular, the village produces citrus fruit, watermelons, melons, tomatoes and cucumbers. A special place among the cultivations is held by the olive groves and the vineyards. In fact, according to the elderly residents of the village, as Karouzis preserves, the community used to be covered with even more vineyards which occupied large expanses of land. However, apart from cultivated pieces of land, there are also the uncultivated ones which take up 1000 square metres of land.'

During the Greek Cypriot uprising against British rule from 1955 to 1959, which aimed to secure union of Cyprus with the Kingdom of Greece through the process of Enosis, EOKA fighter Michalakis Parides, who was born in Anaphotia, died in a shoot out with British troops in 1958, in the village of Vavla, near Pano Lefkara. A statue of him stands in the centre of Larnaca, outside the Archaeological Museum.

In the 2008 presidential election the village voted overwhelmingly for the right-wing DISY candidate Ioannis Kasoulidis (68 percent), against the Communist Party AKEL candidate Dimitris Christofias (32 percent).

== Notable people ==
- Ioannis Eoannou, EOKA fighter
- Stass Paraskos, artist and founder of the Cyprus College of Art
- Michalakis Parides, EOKA fighter (killed in action 1958)
