= Maroni, Cyprus =

Maroni Μαρώνι
- Village
- Location in Cyprus
- Coordinates: 34°45′26″N 33°21′21″E
- Country: Cyprus
- District: Larnaca District

Government
  - Body: Community Council of Maroni
  - President: Neoclis Neocleous
  - Vice President: Michael Charalambous

Population (2021)
  - Total: 740
- Time zone: UTC+2 (EET)
  - Summer (DST): UTC+3 (EEST)
- Website: http://www.maroni.org.cy

Maroni (Greek: Μαρώνι; Turkish: Maroni) is a village located in the Larnaca District of Cyprus.

== History ==
It has been a settlement since Middle Bronze Age.

== Gallery ==
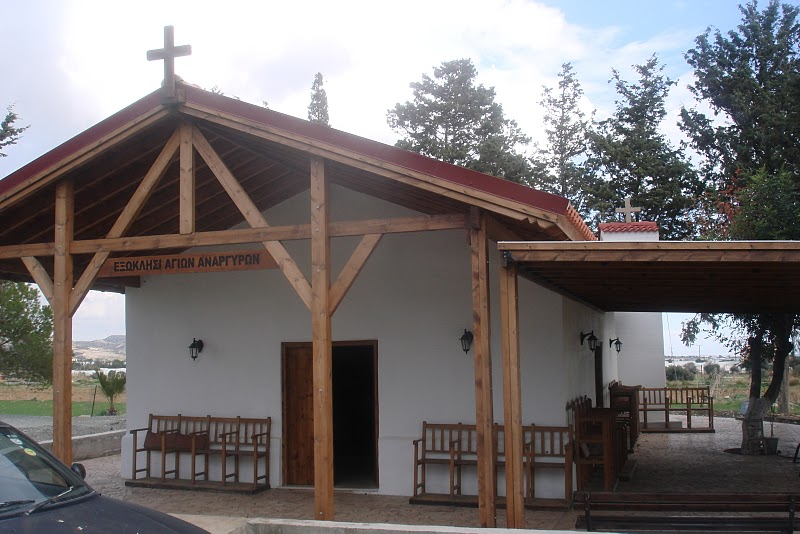
Maroni's church

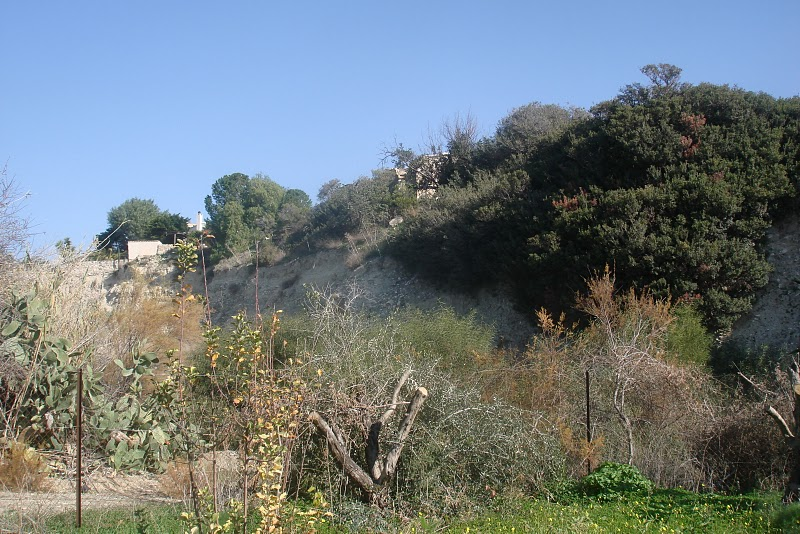
A hill in Maroni

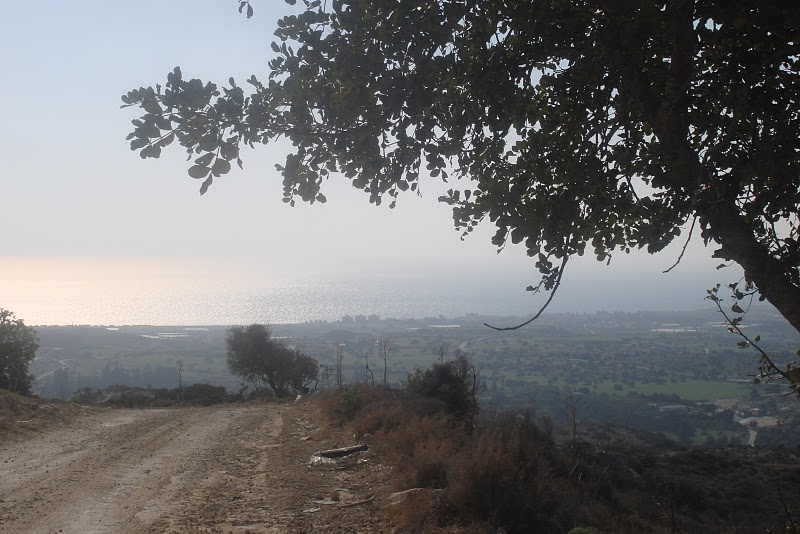
View of Maroni village
