= Kofinou =

- Village
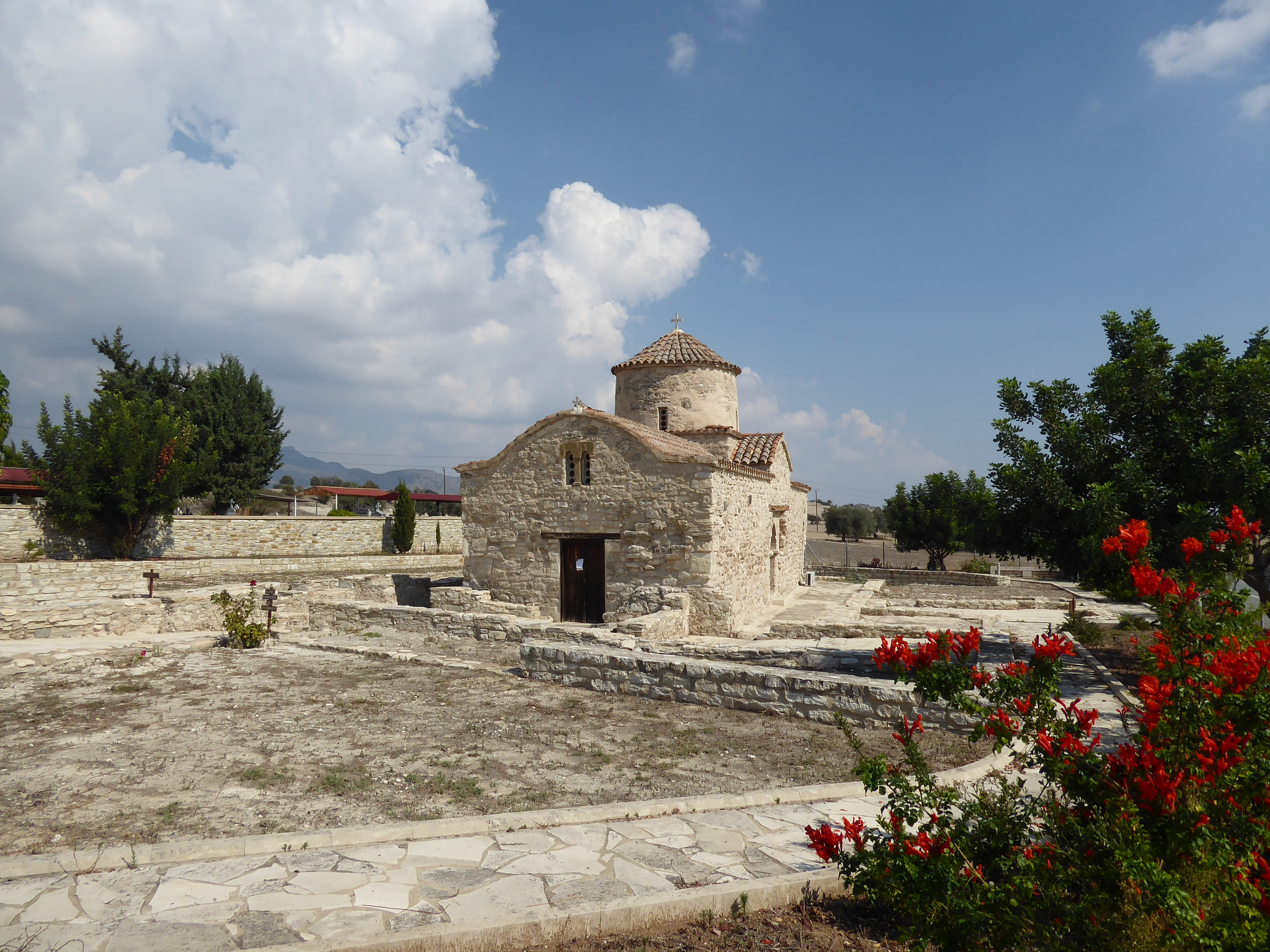
- Church of Panagia Kofinou

- Location in Cyprus
- Coordinates: 34°49′33″N 33°23′30″E
- Country: Cyprus
- District: Larnaca District

Population (2011)
  - Total: 1,312
- Time zone: UTC+2 (EET)
  - Summer (DST): UTC+3 (EEST)

Kofinou (Greek: Κοφίνου; Turkish: Köfünye or Geçitkale) is a village located in the Larnaca District of Cyprus. It is situated where the roads from Nicosia, Larnaca and Limassol trisected, prior to the by-pass built in the 1990s.

== History ==
Cyprus was invaded and conquered by Ottoman Turkey in 1570-1 A.D. At that time a small contingent of Turkish forces was stationed there. Their descendants lived in relative peace with the local Greek and Christian population for many years. In the 1950s during the uprising by Greek Cypriots to overthrow British Empire rule the relationship between the Greek and Turkish population worsened and the Greeks left but were replaced by Turkish Cypriots from another village.

The village became infamous on 15 November 1967, when some National Guards troops overran the TMT (a Turkish-Cypriot armed group) fighters located at the village, including the neighbouring mixed village of Agios Theodoros. Turkish-Cypriot TMT members stationed at the area were controlling the area and blocking the main road from Nicosia to Limassol, making it impossible for Greek-Cypriots civilians to pass through the area without UN escort. After repeated warnings through the United Nations on 15 November 1967, General Grivas and his National Guard to Turkish Cypriots to stop fire at civilians they attacked. The fighting escalated and some 24 Turkish Cypriots, including unarmed civilians lost their lives in the overnight events; Turkey's ultimatum the following day resulted in the withdrawal of the National Guard from the two villages.

This event in particular saw the return of Grivas and his battalion back to Greece. In addition, this event also culminated in the removal of all road blocks upon which Turkish Cypriot buses entering Nicosia were being stopped and by which means the passengers were subjected to a body search.

After the Turkish invasion of Cyprus in 1974, the original Turkish Cypriot population of Kofinou were allocated the village of Lefkoniko – the new Geçitkale – in the north by the Turkish Cypriot administration, to this day where many of them reside.

Kofinou is planned to be the place for large HVDC converter stations for the 2,000 MW EuroAsia Interconnector and the EuroAfrica Interconnector. The EuroAsia Interconnector is a 2000 MW electricity interconnector between Greek, Cypriot, and Israeli power grids via a 1520 km long submarine power cable. The EuroAfrica Interconnector is a 2000 MW interconnector between Greek, Cypriot, and Egypts power grids via 1710 km long submarine power cable. Converter stations will be near the existing Kofinou 132kV transmission substation of the Electricity Authority of Cyprus.
