= Ora, Cyprus =

Ora
- Village
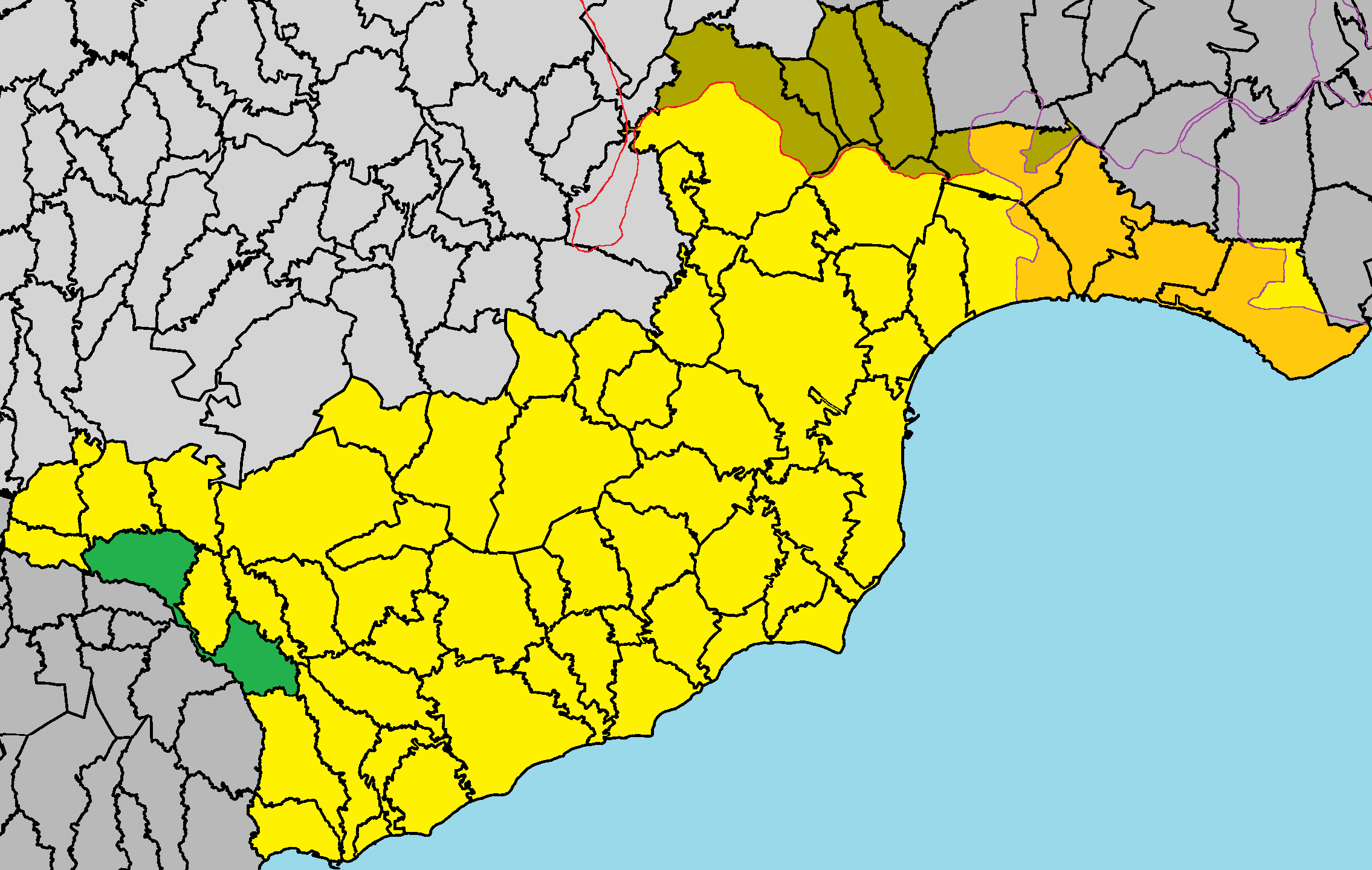

- Location in Cyprus
- Coordinates: 34°51′44″N 33°11′44″E
- Country: Cyprus
- District: Larnaca District

Population (2011)
  - Total: 206
- Time zone: UTC+2 (EET)
  - Summer (DST): UTC+3 (EEST)

Ora (Greek: Ορά) is a village in the Larnaca District of Cyprus. The settlements of Parsata and Drapeia are part of the municipality. Its population in 2011 was 206.
