= Geography of Cyprus =

Cyprus
Κύπρος (Greek); Kýpros; Kıbrıs (Turkish)
- Satellite image of Cyprus in 2022

- Location of Cyprus

Geography
- Location: Mediterranean Sea
- Coordinates: 34°N 33°E
- Largest city: Nicosia
- Area: 9,251 km^{2} (3,572 sq mi)
- Coastline: 648 km (402.6 mi)
- Highest elevation: 1,952 m (6404 ft)
- Highest point: Mount Olympus

Administration
- Republic of Cyprus
- Capital and largest city: Nicosia
- Area covered: 5,896 km^{2} (2,276 sq mi; 63.7%)
- Turkish Republic of Northern Cyprus
- Capital and largest city: North Nicosia
- Area covered: 3,355 km^{2} (1,295 sq mi; 36.3%)
- Sovereign Base Areas of Akrotiri and Dhekelia (British Overseas Territory)
- Capital and largest settlement: Episkopi Cantonment
- Area covered: 254 km^{2} (98 sq mi; 2.7%)

Demographics
- Population: 1,326,108 (2025)
- Population rank: 51st
- Pop. density: 138/km^{2} (357/sq mi)
- Languages: Greek (Cypriot Greek); Turkish (Cypriot Turkish); Cypriot Arabic; English; Armenian; Kurbet; Cypriot Sign
- Ethnic groups: Greek Cypriots; Turkish Cypriots (Turkish settlers); Armenian Cypriots; Lebanese Cypriots; Indians; Romani; British; Russians; Jews

Additional information
- Time zone: Eastern European Time (UTC+2)
  - Summer (DST): Eastern European Summer Time (UTC+3)

Cyprus is an island in the Eastern Basin of the Mediterranean Sea. It is the third-largest island in the Mediterranean, after the Italian islands of Sicily and Sardinia, and the 80th-largest island in the world by area. It is located south of the Anatolian Peninsula, and belongs to the Cyprus Arc. Geographically, Cyprus is located in West Asia, but the country is considered a European country in political geography. Cyprus also had lengthy periods of mainly Greek and Turkish influence along with intermittent Anatolian, Levantine, Byzantine, Ottoman, and Western European influence.

The island is dominated by two mountain ranges, the Troodos Mountains and the Kyrenia Mountains or Pentadaktylos, and the central plain, the Mesaoria, between them. The Troodos Mountains cover most of the southern and western portions of the island and account for roughly half its area. The narrow Kyrenia Range extends along the northern coastline. It is not as high as the Troodos Mountains, and it occupies substantially less area. The two mountain ranges run generally parallel to the Taurus Mountains on the Turkish mainland, the outlines of which are visible from northern Cyprus. Coastal lowlands, varying in width, surround the island.

Geopolitically, the island is divided into four segments. The Republic of Cyprus, the only internationally recognized government, governs the southern 60% of the island, and has been a member state of the European Union since 1 May 2004. The Turkish Republic of Northern Cyprus, diplomatically recognized only by Turkey, occupies the northern third of the island, which is around 36% of the territory. The United Nations-controlled Green Line is a buffer zone that separates the two and it is about 4%. Lastly, two areas—Akrotiri and Dhekelia—remain under British sovereignty for military purposes, collectively forming the Sovereign Base Areas of Akrotiri and Dhekelia (SBA). The SBAs are located on the southern coast of the island and together encompass 254 km^{2}, or 2.8% of the island.

== Terrain ==
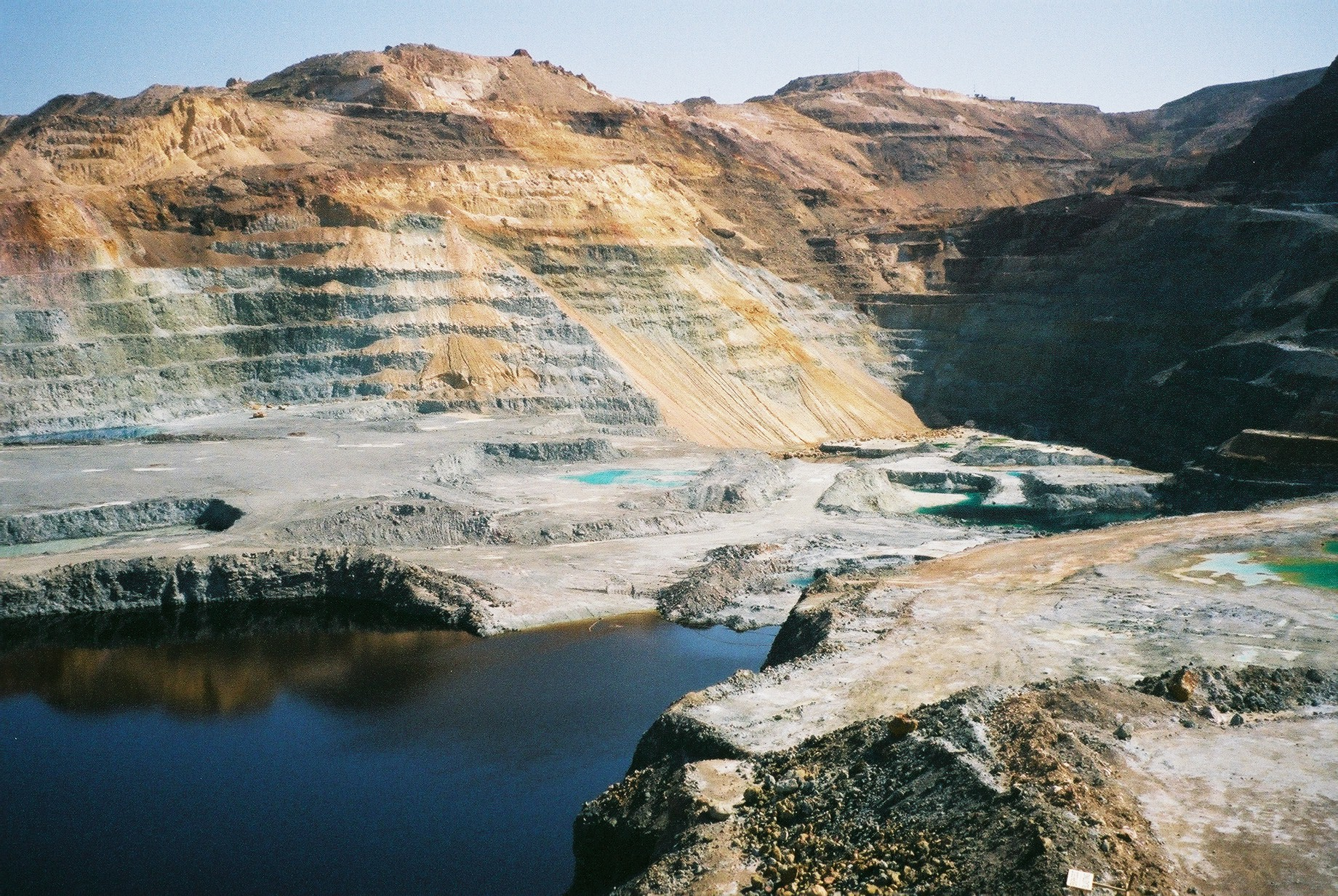
Skouriotissa mine

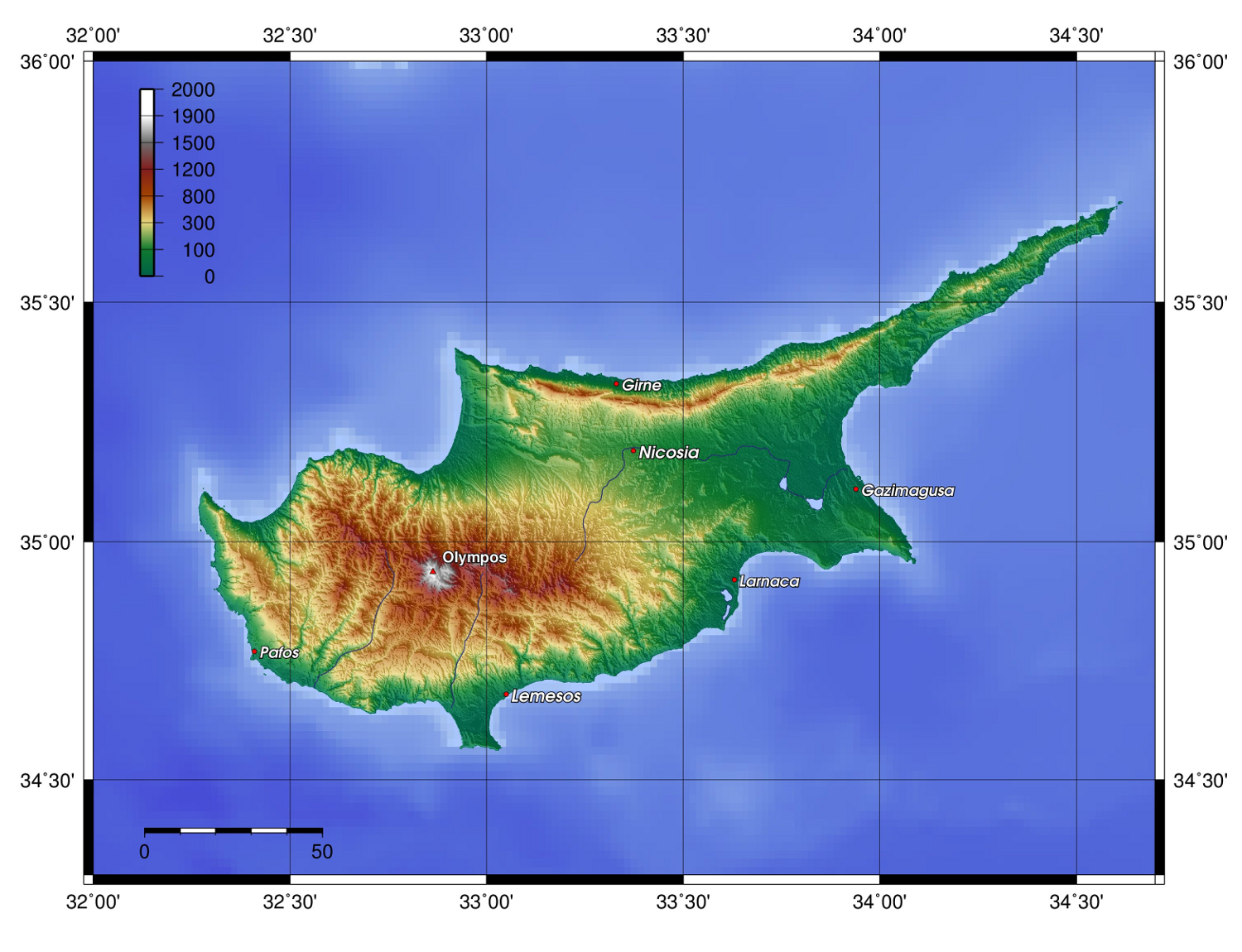
Topography

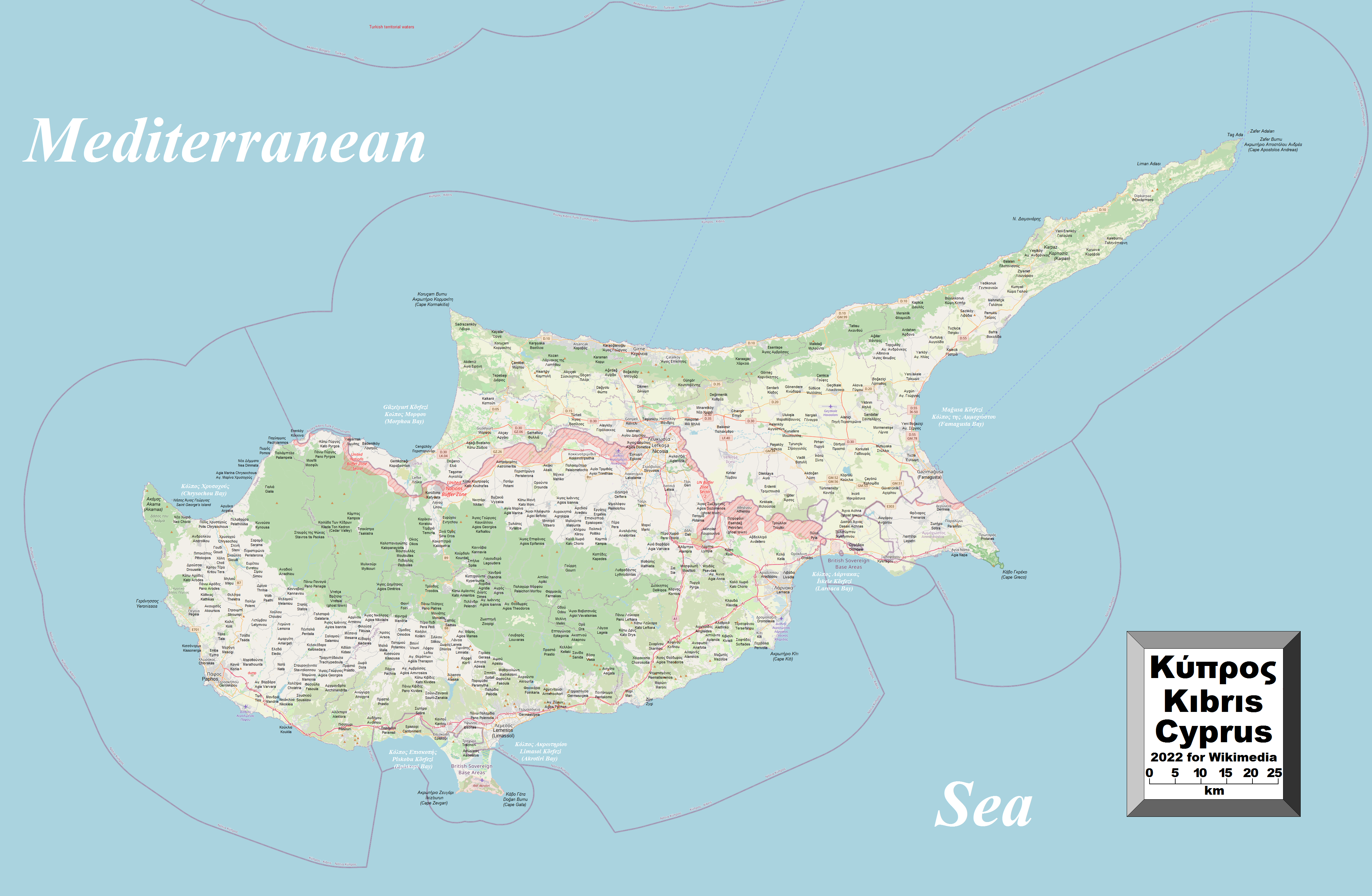
Detailed map of Cyprus

There are three distinct geologic regions on the island. In the central and western part of the island is the Troodos Massif, a mountain range whose surface layer is mostly basaltic lava rock, and whose maximum elevation is 1,952 m (6,404 ft). Running in a thin arc along the northeast margin of the island is Cyprus's second mountain range, a limestone formation called the Kyrenia Range. The space between these ranges is home to the capital Nicosia, visible as a grayish-brown patch near the image's centre.

The rugged Troodos Mountains, whose principal range stretches from Pomos Point in the northwest almost to Larnaca Bay on the east, are the single most conspicuous feature of the landscape. Intensive uplifting and folding in the formative period left the area highly fragmented, so that subordinate ranges and spurs veer off at many angles, their slopes incised by steep-sided valleys. In the southwest, the mountains descend in a series of stepped foothills to the coastal plain.

While the Troodos Mountains are a massif formed of molten igneous rock, the Kyrenia Range is a narrow limestone ridge that rises suddenly from the plains. Its easternmost extension becomes a series of foothills on the Karpas Peninsula. That peninsula points toward Asia Minor, to which Cyprus belongs geologically. The Kyrenia Range is also known as the Pentadactylon Mountains, due to a summit resembling five fingers.

Even the highest peaks of the Kyrenia Range are hardly more than half the height of the great dome of the Troodos massif, Mount Olympus (1,952 m or 6,404 ft), but their seemingly inaccessible, jagged slopes make them considerably more spectacular. British writer Lawrence Durrell, in Bitter Lemons, wrote of the Troodos as "an unlovely jumble of crags and heavyweight rocks" and of the Kyrenia Range as belonging to "the world of Gothic Europe, its lofty crags studded with crusader castles."

Rich copper deposits were discovered in antiquity on the slopes of the Troodos. The massive sulphide deposits formed as a part of an ophiolite complex at a spreading centre under the Mediterranean Sea which was tectonically uplifted during the Pleistocene and emplaced in its current location.

== Drainage ==
In much of the island, access to a year-round supply of water is difficult. This is traditionally attributed to deforestation which damaged the island's drainage system through erosion, but Grove and Rackham question this view. A network of winter rivers rises in the Troodos Mountains and flows out from them in all directions. The Yialias River and the Pedhieos River flow eastward across the Mesaoria into Famagusta Bay; the Serraghis River flows northwest through the Morphou plain. All of the island's rivers, however, are dry in the summer. An extensive system of dams and waterways has been constructed to bring water to farming areas.

The central Mesaoria plain is the agricultural heartland of the island, but its productiveness for wheat and barley depends very much on winter rainfall; other crops are grown under irrigation.This broad, central plain, open to the sea at either end, was once covered with rich forests. However, the timber was needed by ancient conquerors for their sailing vessels, so little evidence of the woodland remains . The now-divided capital of the island, Nicosia, lies in the middle of this central plain.

== Vegetation ==
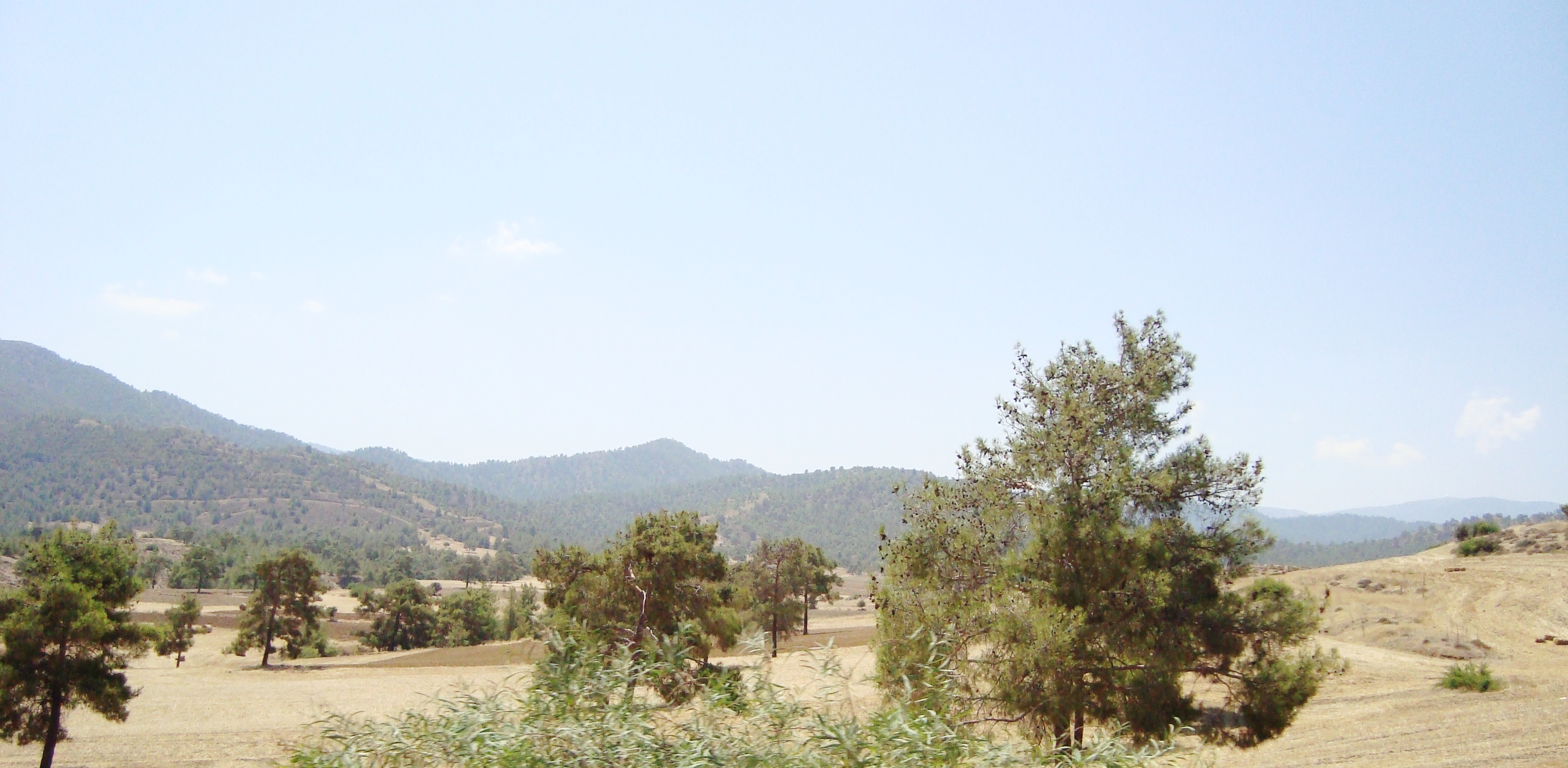
Cyprus countryside on the way to Troodos Mountains during the summer

Despite its small size, Cyprus has a variety of natural vegetation. This includes forests of conifers and broadleaved trees such as pine (Pinus brutia), cedar, cypresses, and oaks. Ancient authors write that most of Cyprus, even Messaoria, was heavily forested, and there are still considerable forests on the Troodos and Kyrenia ranges, and locally at lower altitudes. About 12% of the whole island is classified as woodland. Where there is no forest, tall shrub communities of golden oak (Quercus alnifolia), strawberry tree (Arbutus andrachne), terebinth (Pistacia terebinthus), olive (Olea europaea), kermes oak (Quercus coccifera), and styrax (Styrax officinalis) are found, but such maquis is uncommon. Over most of the island untilled ground bears a grazed covering of garrigue, largely composed of low bushes of Cistus, Genista sphacelata, Calicotome villosa, Lithospermum hispidulum, Phagnalon rupestre, and, locally, Pistacia lentiscus. Where grazing is excessive this covering is soon reduced, and an impoverished batha remains, consisting principally of Thymus capitatus, Sarcopoterium spinosum, and a few stunted herbs.

== Climate ==
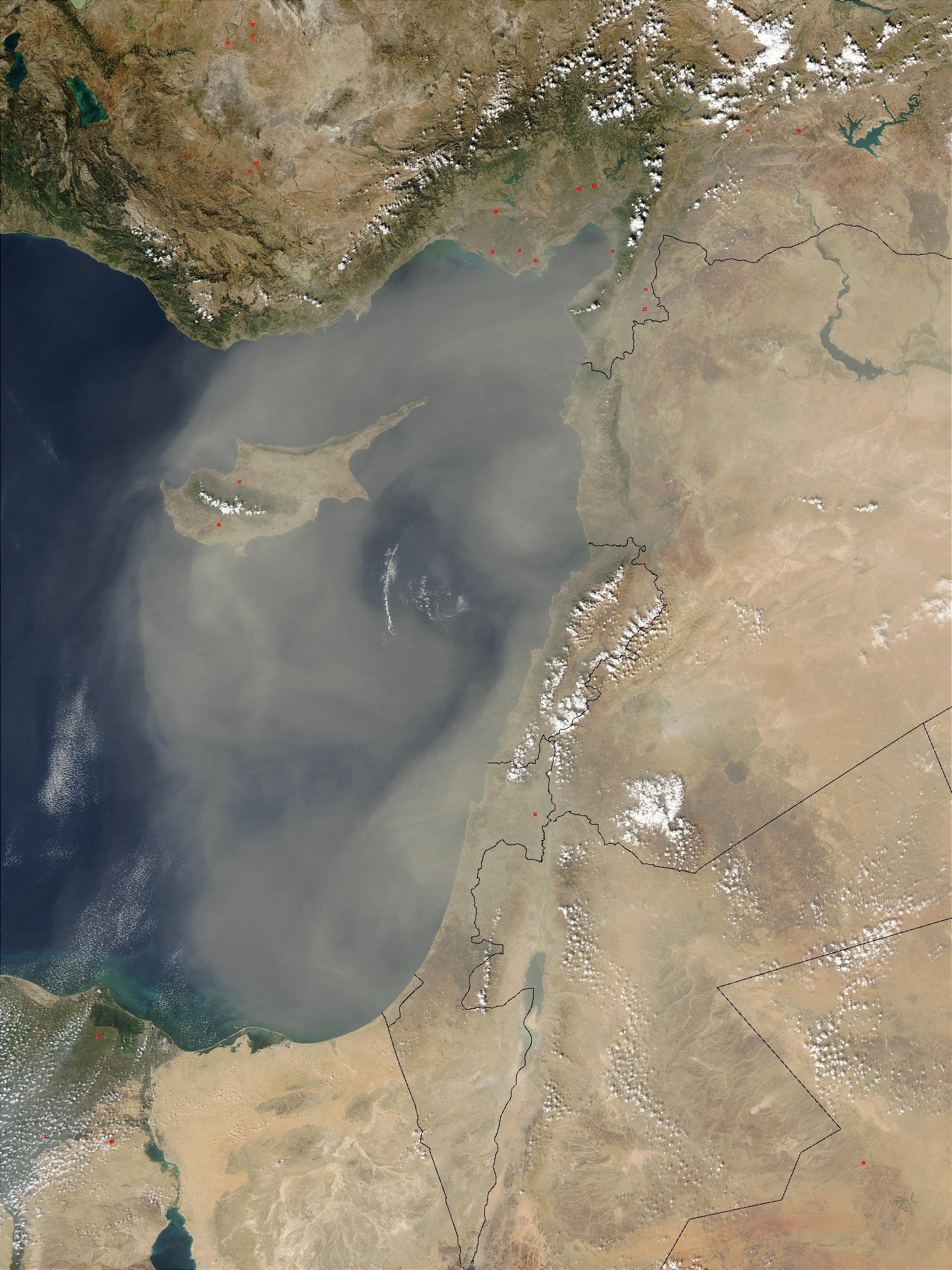
Sandstorm in the Levant, October 19, 2002

The intense Mediterranean climate, warm and rather dry, with rainfall mainly between November and March, favours agriculture. In general, the island experiences extremely mild wet winters and dry hot summers. Variations in temperature and rainfall are governed by altitude and, to a lesser extent, distance from the coast. Hot, dry summers from mid-May to mid-September and rainy, rather changeable winters from November to mid-March are separated by short autumn and spring seasons.

== Area and boundaries ==
Area:
Total: 9,251 km^{2} (of which 5,896 km^{2} (2,276 sq mi) are under the control of the Republic of Cyprus and of which 3,355 km^{2} (1,295 sq mi) are under the administration of the Turkish Republic of Northern Cyprus)

Neighbouring territories include Turkey 75 kilometres (47 mi) to the north, Lebanon and Syria to the northeast (105 and 108 kilometres (65 and 67 mi), respectively), Israel 200 kilometres (124 mi) to the southeast, Egypt 380 kilometres (236 mi) to the south, and Greece to the west: 280 kilometres (174 mi) to the small Dodecanesian island of Kastellorizo, 400 kilometres (249 mi) to Rhodes and 800 kilometres (497 mi) to the Greek mainland.

Land: 9,241 km^{2}
Water: 10 km^{2}

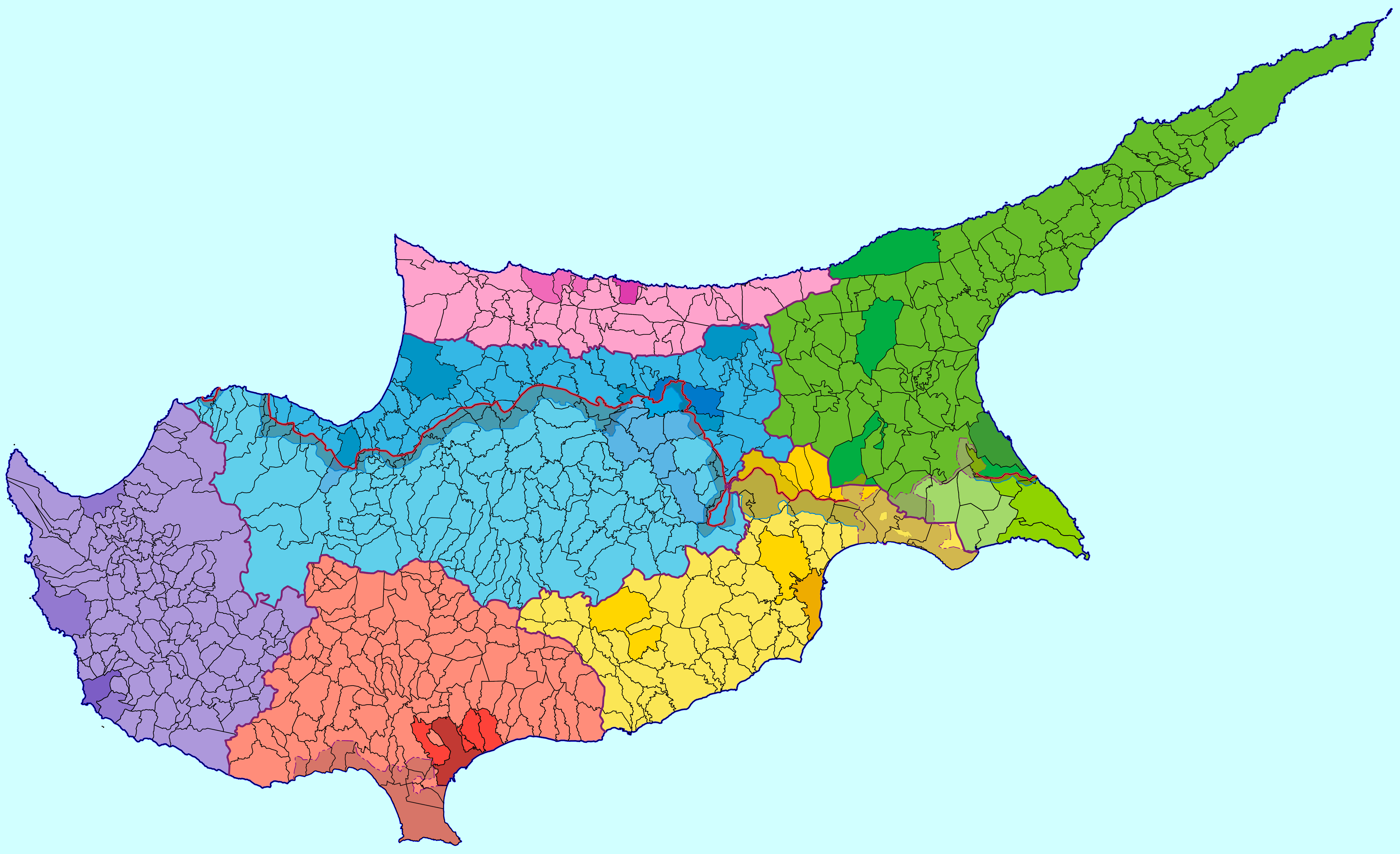
Municipalities and communities map of Cyprus

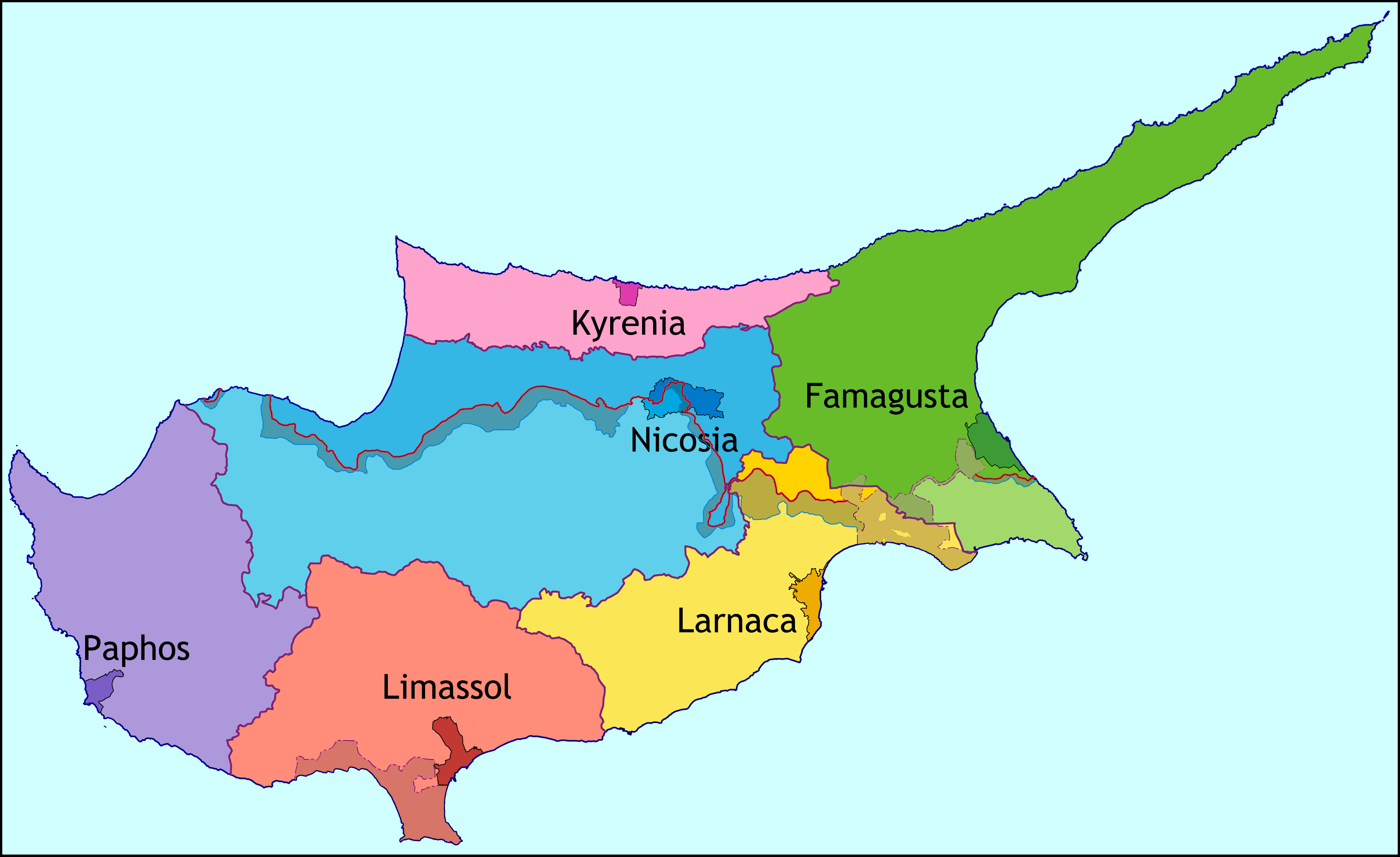
District map of Cyprus

Land boundaries: 0 km

Coastline: 648 km

Maritime claims:
Territorial sea: 12 nmi (22.2 km; 13.8 mi)
Continental shelf: 200 m depth or to the depth of exploitation
Exclusive Economic Zone: 98,707 km^{2} (38,111 mi^{2})

Elevation extremes:
Lowest point: Mediterranean Sea 0 m
Highest point: Olympus 1,952 m

== Resource and land use ==
Natural resources: copper, pyrite, asbestos, gypsum, timber, salt, marble, clay earth pigment

Land use:
arable land: 9.90%
permanent crops: 3.24%
other: 86.86% (2012)

Irrigated land: 457.9 km^{2} (2007)

Total renewable water resources: 0.78 km^{3} (2011)

Freshwater withdrawal (domestic/industrial/agricultural):
total: 0.18 km^{3}/yr (10%/3%/86%)
per capital: 164.7 m^{3}/yr (2009)

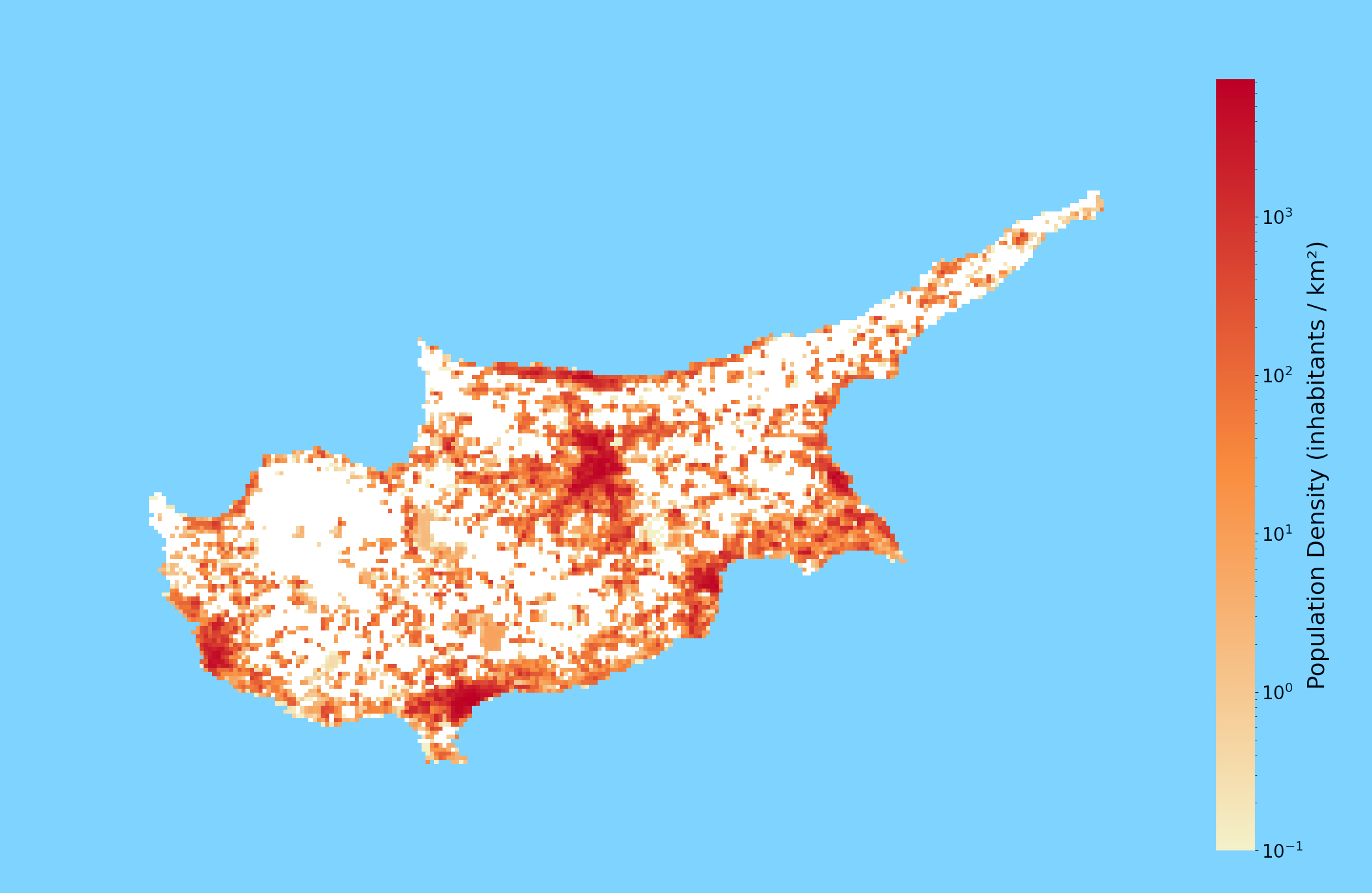
Population density of Cyprus (2023)

== Environmental concerns ==
Natural hazards: moderate earthquake activity; droughts

Environment – current issues: water resource problems (no natural reservoir catchments, seasonal disparity in rainfall, sea water intrusion to island's largest aquifer, increased salination in the north); water pollution from sewage and industrial wastes; coastal degradation; loss of wildlife habitats from urbanization.

Environment – international agreements:
party to: Air Pollution, Air Pollution-Persistent Organic Pollutants, Biodiversity, Climate Change, Climate Change-Kyoto Protocol, Endangered Species, Environmental Modification, Hazardous Wastes, Law of the Sea, Marine Dumping, Nuclear Test Ban, Ozone Layer Protection, Ship Pollution, Wetlands
signed, but not ratified: none

== See also ==
- Geology of Cyprus
- List of Cyprus islets
- List of dams and reservoirs in Cyprus
- List of rivers of Cyprus
