= Machairas =

Machairas can refer to:

- Leontios Machairas, a 15th-century Cypriot Greek historian
- Machairas Monastery, a 12th-century monastery in Cyprus
- Machairas Forest, a state forest and park in Cyprus
- Machairas, Aetolia-Acarnania, a village in the municipal unit Astakos, western Greece
