= Alikos =

River in Nicosia District, Cyprus

Alikos Αλυκός (in Greek) • Alikos (in Turkish)
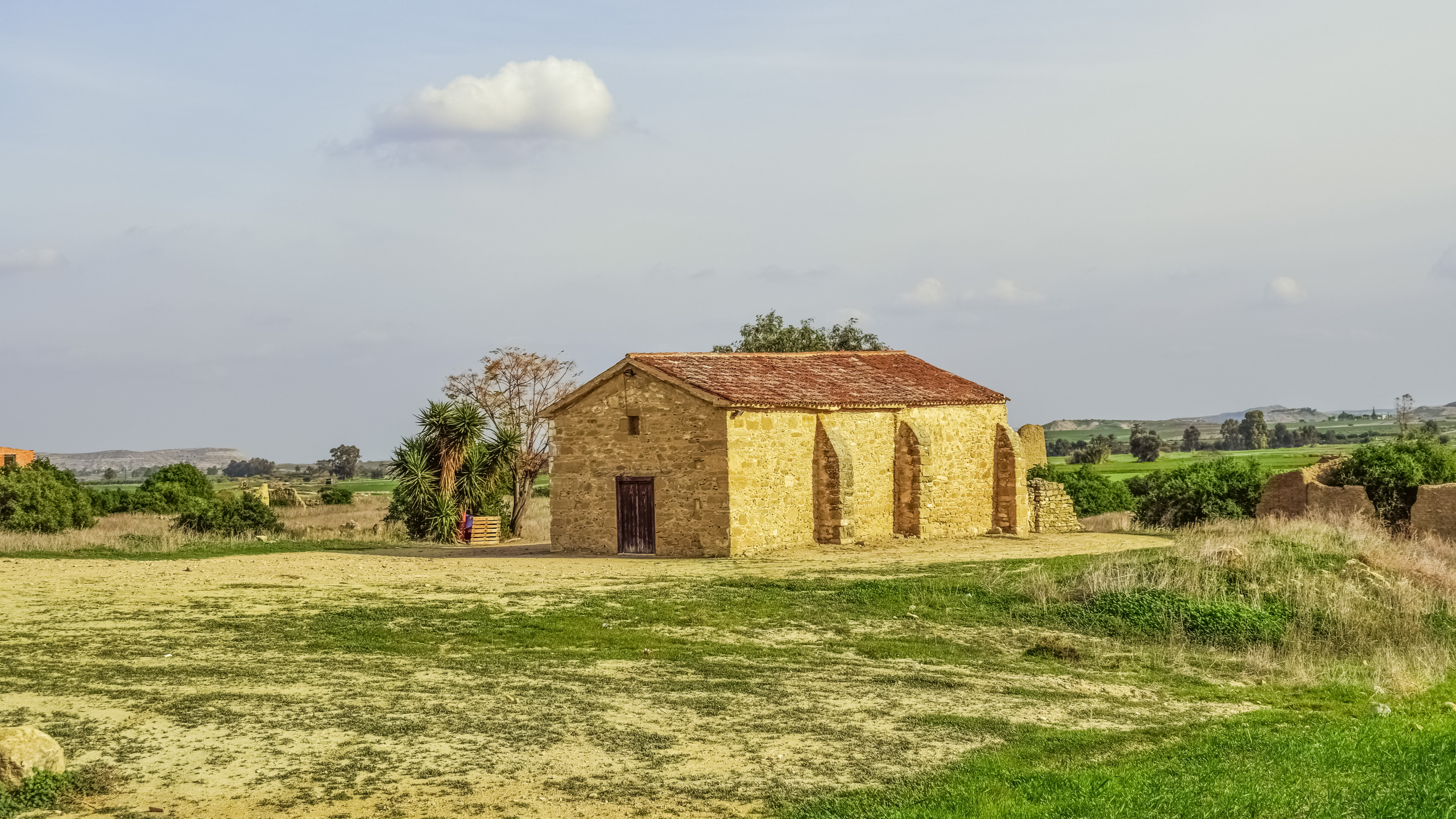
- Alikos river plain at Ayios Sozomenos (river bed in background at distance of c. 200 m.)

Location
- Country: Cyprus
- District: Nicosia District

Physical characteristics
- Source
  - location: Kapedes, Troodos Mountains
  - coordinates: 34°58′32″N 33°15′14″E
  - elevation: 550 m (1,800 ft)
- Mouth
  - location: Ayios Sozomenos
  - coordinates: 35°3′57″N 33°26′18″E
  - elevation: 180 m (590 ft)
- Length: 31.33 km (19.47 mi)

Basin features
- Tributaries
  - left: Almyros

The Alikos or Alykos (Greek: Αλυκός or Greek: Άλυκος, Turkish: Alikos) is a river in Nicosia District, Cyprus, a tributary of the Yialias. The river originates in the Machairas Forest in the Troodos Mountains close to Kapedes and flows northeast across the Mesaoria plain, to Ayios Sozomenos, south east of Nicosia, where is joins the Yialias.

The Alikos is only an intermittently flowing river. Near its source the average rainfall is around 52.5 cm (20.7 in) per annum.

It has a length of 31.3 km (19.4 mi).

At its source there are two streams either side of Kapedes, which flow northwards and unite just north of the village. The stream on the west side is named Argaki tou Syrkanou (stream of Syrkani). This becomes the united stream Galinion which then flows through Analiontas , but just before the village it becomes the Alikos.

The Alikos then passes near Margi and reaches Agios Sozomenos. At its beginning the river flows over lavas that form the igneous complex of Troodos, but then continues through sedimentary rocks until reaching the alluvial deposits of the Ayios Sozomenos area and its confluence with the Yialias.

Its major tributary is the Almyros, which originates north of Kampia. It flows eastwards past the village of Pera and joins the Alikos north-west of Dali about 6 km (3.7 mi) upstream from its confluence with the Yialias. The length of the Almyros is 21 km (13 mi). It is only intermittently flowing.

The lower part of the Alikos and Almyros has been declared a conservation area. It became a Special Protection Area in 2002 and in 2015 became a Natura 2000 Special Area of Conservation.

The dominant species along the riverbed is Tamarix smyrnensis, a variety of Tamarix occurring mainly in streams of southern Greece. It is a deciduous small tree or shrub found where the water is brackish. It is extremely resistant to drought and soil salinity. The Greek word for Tamarix is Almyriki (Αλμυρίκι), which was associated with the word Almyros (Αλμυρός) by a process of paretymology. Almyros means salty. Salt Cedar is an alternative name for Tamarix in English. Reed beds occur in the Ayios Sozomenos area, where there are also cliffs alongside the river which favour some rare plant and bird species.

Alikos, spelled ἁλυκός, is a classical Greek word meaning salty.

As an intermittently flowing river, the Alikos is frequently dry. However it can have large volumes flowing at times of high rainfall. In the Autumn of 1971 the Alikos River near Ayios Sozomenos was recorded with a flow of 60 cubic metres (2,100 cubic feet) per second. Indeed, the weir near Ayios Sozomenos with the flow gauging station suffered repeated overflowing and the erosion of the banks, and was widened to 60 ft (18 m). to handle the flow.

The average rainfall in the Alikos River area reached 363.3 mm (14.30 in) per annum during the period 1991 – 2005. The Alikos and Almyros feed the Yialias River and thence the Central Mesaoria Aquifer, through the infiltration of surface water into the alluvial deposits of the rivers. The aquifer is recharged by a total of 10 million m^{3} (2.2 billion imp gal) per year, mainly from rainfall and underground water flowing from the northeastern edges of the Troodos Massif (an ophiolite).

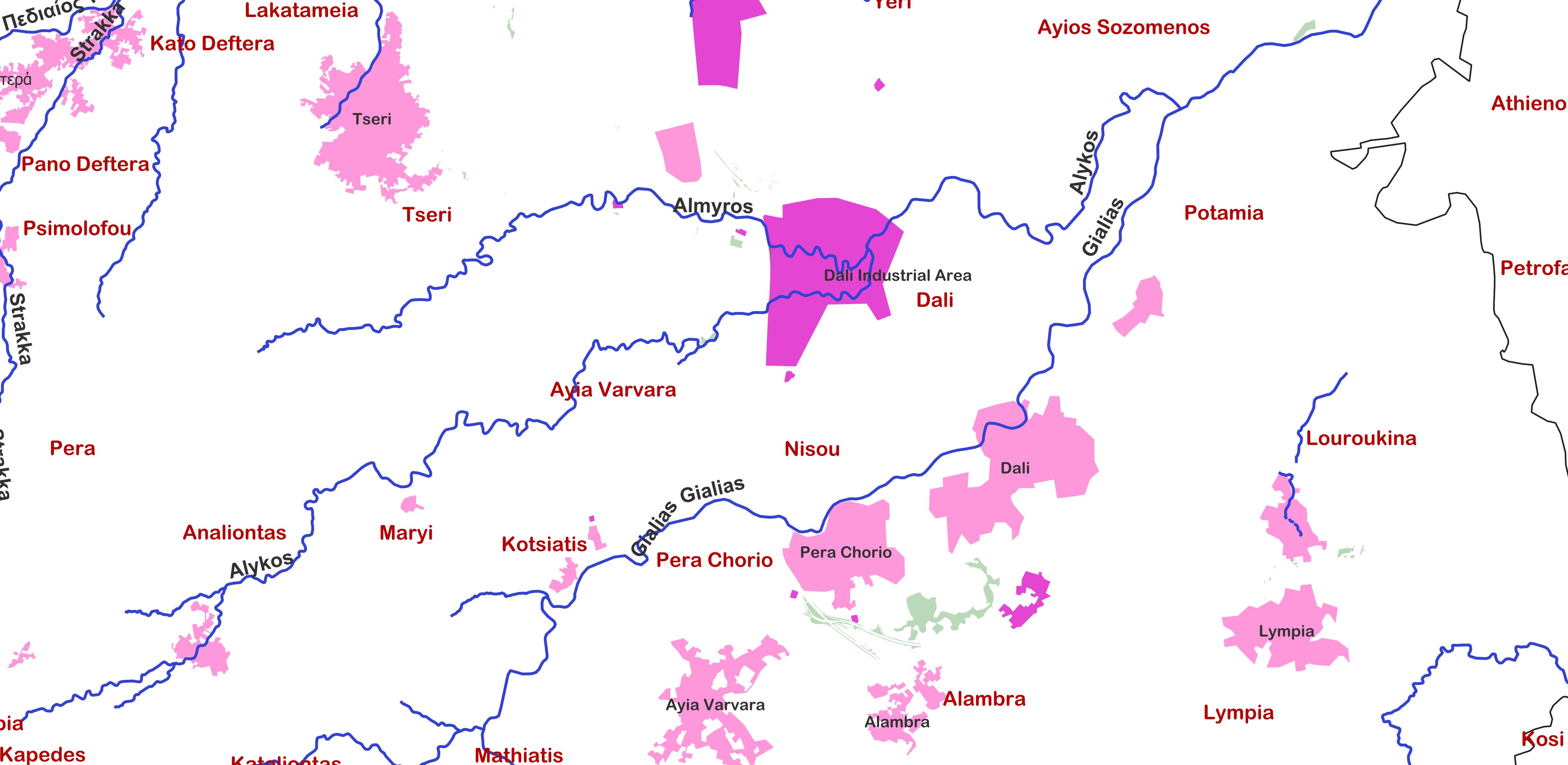
Map of the Alikos (Alykos) River and its main tributary

== See also ==
- List of rivers of Cyprus
