= Agios Sozomenos =

Agios Sozomenos: Αγιος Σωζόμενος (Greek); Arpalık (Turkish)
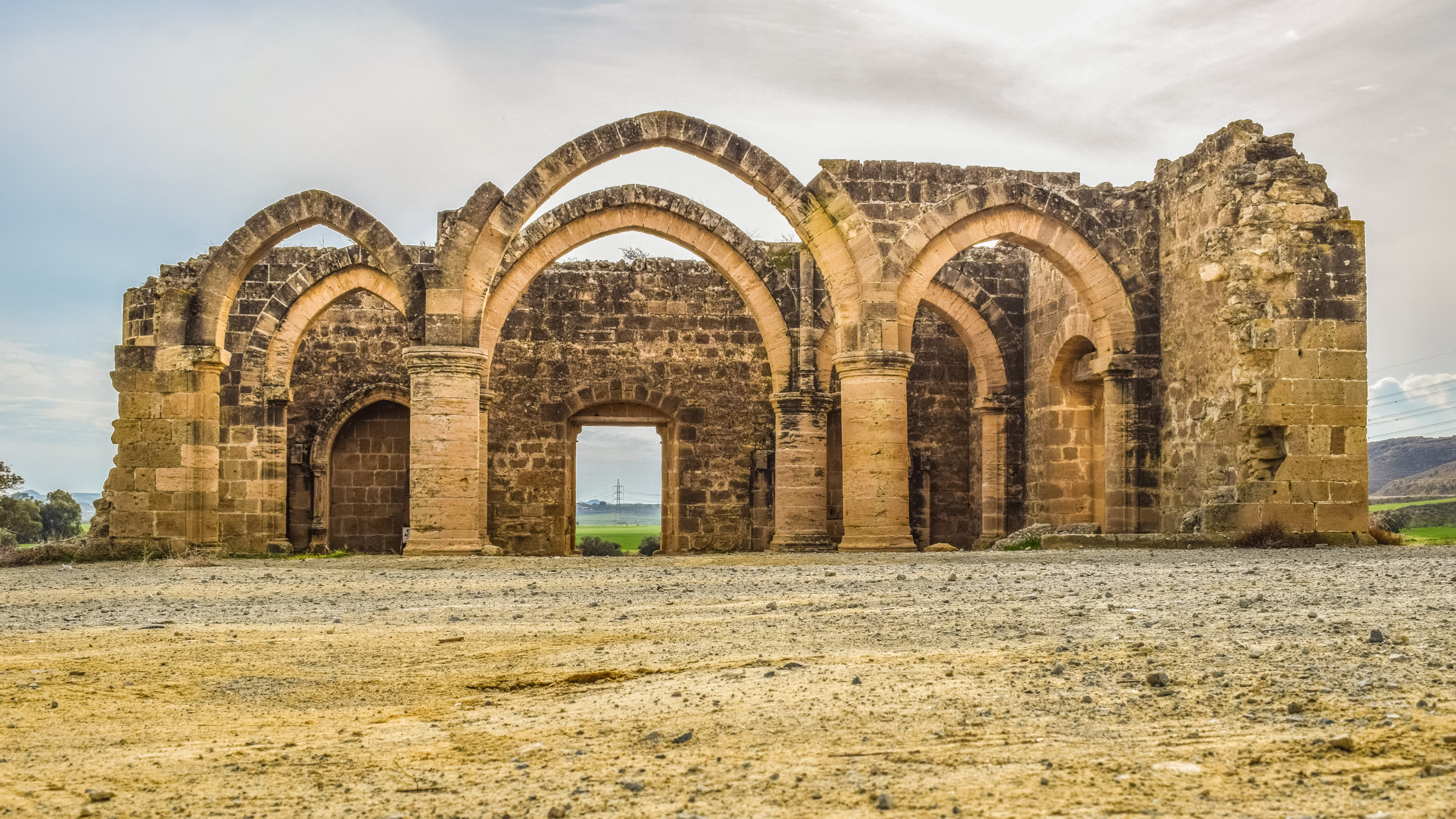

- Location in Cyprus
- Coordinates: 35°3′57″N 33°26′18″E
- Country: Cyprus
- District: Nicosia District

Population (2001)
  - Total: 4
- Time zone: UTC+2 (EET)
  - Summer (DST): UTC+3 (EEST)

Agios Sozomenos (Greek: Αγιος Σωζόμενος; Turkish: Arpalık (lit. "place of barley")) is a deserted village in the Nicosia District of Cyprus, close to the Green Line and near Potamia. It is located at the confluence of the Alikos river with the Gialias, the second-longest river of Cyprus.

The village is known for the Byzantine cave chapel dedicated to the hermit saint known as Sozomenos; the never-completed Latin church of Saint Mamas; and the ruined mud-brick buildings that date to before the village's abandonment in 1964. In recent years, the site has also become a popular attraction for visitors. There have been a number of archaeological excavations near the village, including a project focused on remains from the Late Bronze Age directed by Despina Pilides of the Department of Antiquities since 2016.

== Cave chapel ==
300 meters from the center of the village lies a church converted from a hermit's cave. The cave has been closed with a wall since 1912, when a British court awarded control of the chapel to the Greek Cypriot inhabitants of the village. It includes a number of wall paintings depicting scenes from the life of Saint Sozomenos, dating to the 14th century. (An earlier layer from the 10th century were taken to the Byzantine Museum in Nicosia.) Details of the saint's life are unknown, as no synaxarium survives from before 1780, but Sozomenos is likely to have lived in the 10th or 11th centuries. The paintings depict miracles attributed to Saint Sozomenos. After his death, a cult developed around his healing powers, which led to the development of the cave as a church and building up a village around it. The cave also has niches with icons and candles; an agiasma (holy water fountain); and a recess for burial, though the saint's remains have been removed.

The art historian Nikolas Bakirtzis has described the program of paintings in the cave as follows:

These images were part of the effort to establish the chapel as a cult center through the documentation of the saint’s ‘credentials’ for sainthood. At the same time they emphasized the cave chapel’s function as a pilgrimage site anchored around the saint’s tomb and his legacy as a healer. … There is little doubt that the artist intended to provide a recognizable visual reference for pilgrims visiting Sozomenos’s hermitage and to locate the saint at the site of the church of the Virgin, thus extending the sacred realm of his healing presence.

The church of the Virgin Bakirtzis refers to is the main Byzantine church of the village, which is still used for services. It may have been originally dedicated to Saint George, since a small fresco survives on the outside wall.

== Latin church ==
The arches that stand prominently in the village belong to the church of Agios Mamas, which dates back to the period of Latin rule in Cyprus (14th to 16th centuries). The scholarly consensus is that it was never completed, as is evidenced by unfinished stonework and other architectural details. It features two arcosolia for the burial of elite donors. Today, the church is a popular attraction for visitors of various sorts from nearby Nicosia.

== Later history ==
In 1831, the village had 34 Turkish Cypriot males and 33 Greek Cypriot males. The overall population and the proportion of Turkish Cypriots increased over the next century, reaching a peak of 172 Turkish Cypriots and 25 Greek Cypriots in 1960. On 6 February 1964, the village was the site of intercommunal violence that led to its abandonment. These events have been the subject of a number of films and articles, which include many interviews with former inhabitants. In 1987, the Cypriot director Panicos Chrysanthou made the film A Detail in Cyprus (Λεπτομέρεια στην Κύπρο) about the village and specifically the events of 1964. Most of the mud-brick buildings have fallen into ruins today.
