= Kapedes =

Kapedes: Καπέδες (Greek); Kapedez (Turkish)
- Location in Cyprus
- Coordinates: 34°58′32″N 33°15′14″E
- Country: Cyprus
- District: Nicosia District
- Elevation: 1,840 ft (560 m)

Population (2021)
  - Total: 566
- Time zone: UTC+2 (EET)
  - Summer (DST): UTC+3 (EEST)

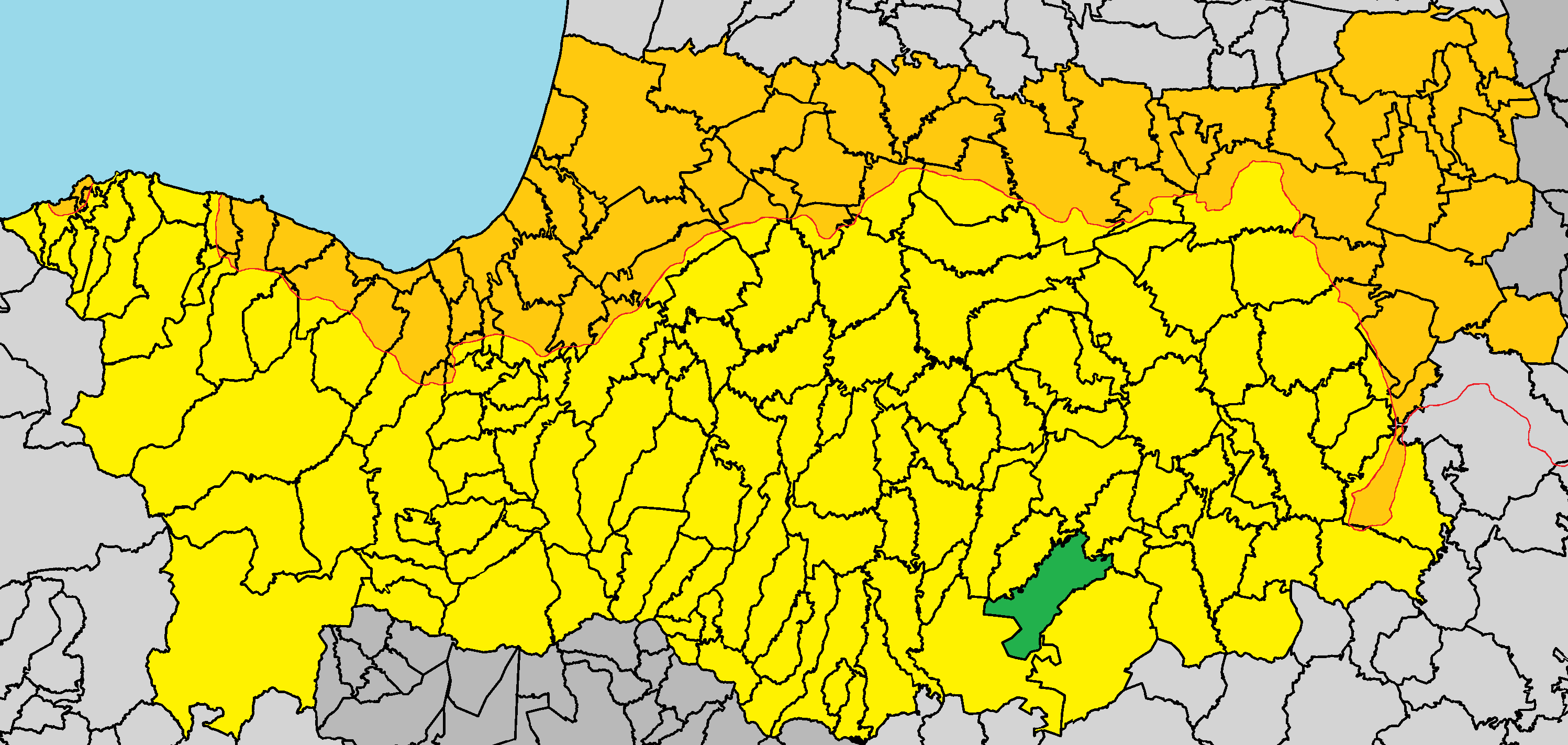
Location of Kapades within the Nicosia District

Kapedes (Greek: Καπέδες; Turkish: Kapedez) is a village located in the Nicosia District of Cyprus on the northern slopes of the Troodos Mountains, at a height of around 560 m (1,840 ft).

A tributary of the Pedieos, called Argaki of Agios Onoufrios, and several tributaries of the Gialias cross the area around Kapedes.

Florio Bustron (16th century) records the village as "Capedes", although some old maps record the name as "Capdor". The village continued to exist during Ottoman Turkish rule. The nearby Machairas Monastery possessed land in the village area.

The Ottoman tax census of 1572 recorded Kapedes as "Kapeze" with 26 properties. The first British census in 1881 records that Kapedes was part of the Nahieh of "Dagh" (i.e. mountainous area) of Nicosia District or Caza, when it has a population of 212.

The Community (Civil Parish) forms part of the combined authority called the Community Service Complex of Tamassos, named after the ancient city.

== Population ==
Population at recent censuses, below:

Kapedes
Year	Population
1960	411(*)
2001	523
2011	572
2021	566

(*) All Greek/Greek Cypriot
