= Mesaoria =

Landform on the island of Cyprus

Coordinates: 35°10′N 33°40′E

The Mesaoria (Greek: Μεσαορία, Turkish: Mesarya) is a broad, sweeping plain which makes up the north centre of the island of Cyprus.

Mesaoria

== Etymology ==
The word "Mesaoria" (sometimes spelled "Mesarya"), means "between the mountains" in Greek.

== Geography ==
The Mesaoria is a broad plain on the island of Cyprus which extends across the island from Famagusta Bay in the east to Morphou Bay in the west and is bounded on the south by the Troodos Mountains and on the north by the Kyrenia Mountains. It has a length of 96 km (60 mi), and a breadth varying from 16 to 32 km (9.9 to 19.9 mi). It has an area of approximately 1,000 km^{2} (390 sq mi). It rises to an altitude of 325 m (1,066 ft), with an average elevation of perhaps 100 m (330 ft).

It has seasonal streams that form from melting snow, which descend from the southern chain and rarely reach the sea. The Pedieos and lalias (Yialias, Idalias) lose most of their flood waters in the marshes around Salamis, near Famagusta Bay. The Pedieos rises near Machairas Monastery and passes close to Nicosia, and flowed through it before it was diverted by the Venetians. The lalias rises near the source of the Pedieos, passes through Nisou, Dali and Pyroi, and traverses the Mesaoria more or less parallel to the Pedieos. A smaller but more constant streams is the Cares (Clarios), which flows from the slopes of the Troodos Mountains into the Bay of Morphou.

The alluvial plains of the centre of the island are for the most part the product of successive rain-storms and floods which have brought down immense quantities of light debris from the mountains which has been spread over the lower lands, principally by human agency exerted in the system of colmatage, which has been practised from time immemorial. This has resulted in the general raising of the land surface and incidentally in the natural reclamation of many acres of land in the lower parts of the Mesaoria, which once were arms of the sea.

It is the agricultural heartland of Cyprus, but it depends completely on winter rainfall and irrigation for its water, which limits production. It is also the most settled region on the island, containing dozens of villages and many of the largest towns, including the capital, Nicosia.

For the most part, the Mesaoria is a flat, bare plain, with few trees except for those planted as windbreaks. Due to deforestation, much of the Mesaoria is covered with "kafkalla", which is a local term referring to calcium carbonate that has been compacted into a hardpan. The only plants that grow well on this surface are quickly eaten by grazing animals, which has greatly exacerbated soil erosion.

The plain has a subtropical semi-arid climate with temperatures of 40 °C being common. The rainfall on the plain is significantly lower than in the mountains, but in recent years a number of dams and irrigation systems have been constructed to capture the mountain runoff.

== History ==
Twenty million years ago Cyprus was two islands, which were the predecessors of the Kyrenia and Troodos mountain ranges. Approximately one million years ago, the Mesaoria plain arose, resulting in the current island of Cyprus. At various times, changing levels of the Mediterranean sea covered and exposed the plain; it has been in its present form since the end of the Pleistocene.

The Mesaoria plain shows evidence of cultivation dating from the Neolithic. In classical times the entire center of the island was covered by dense forests. Most of these were cut down in the middle of the 1st century BC to provide wood for the Ptolemaic navy. Additionally, much wood was harvested to provide energy for the extraction of copper. However, as recently as the late sixteenth century there were still significant stands of trees on the plain. Today, the only remaining forested areas are on the surrounding mountains, particularly the Troodos range.

As evidenced by a papal document in 1196, the eastern region of Mesaoria had become settled with a dense network of villages by the 12th century. The plain served as the island's prime agricultural region.

A single line of railway of 2 ft 6in gauge was constructed running the full length of the plain, from Famagusta to Nicosia (58 km (36 mi)) and then to Karavostasi, on Morphou Bay (a further 55 km (34 mi)). Work was begun in 1904 and Nicosia was connected on 21 October 1905. The line was closed in 1951.

== See also ==
- Breadbasket
- Messara Plain
