= Lazanias =

Lazanias: Λαζανιάς (Greek); Lazanya (Turkish)
- Village
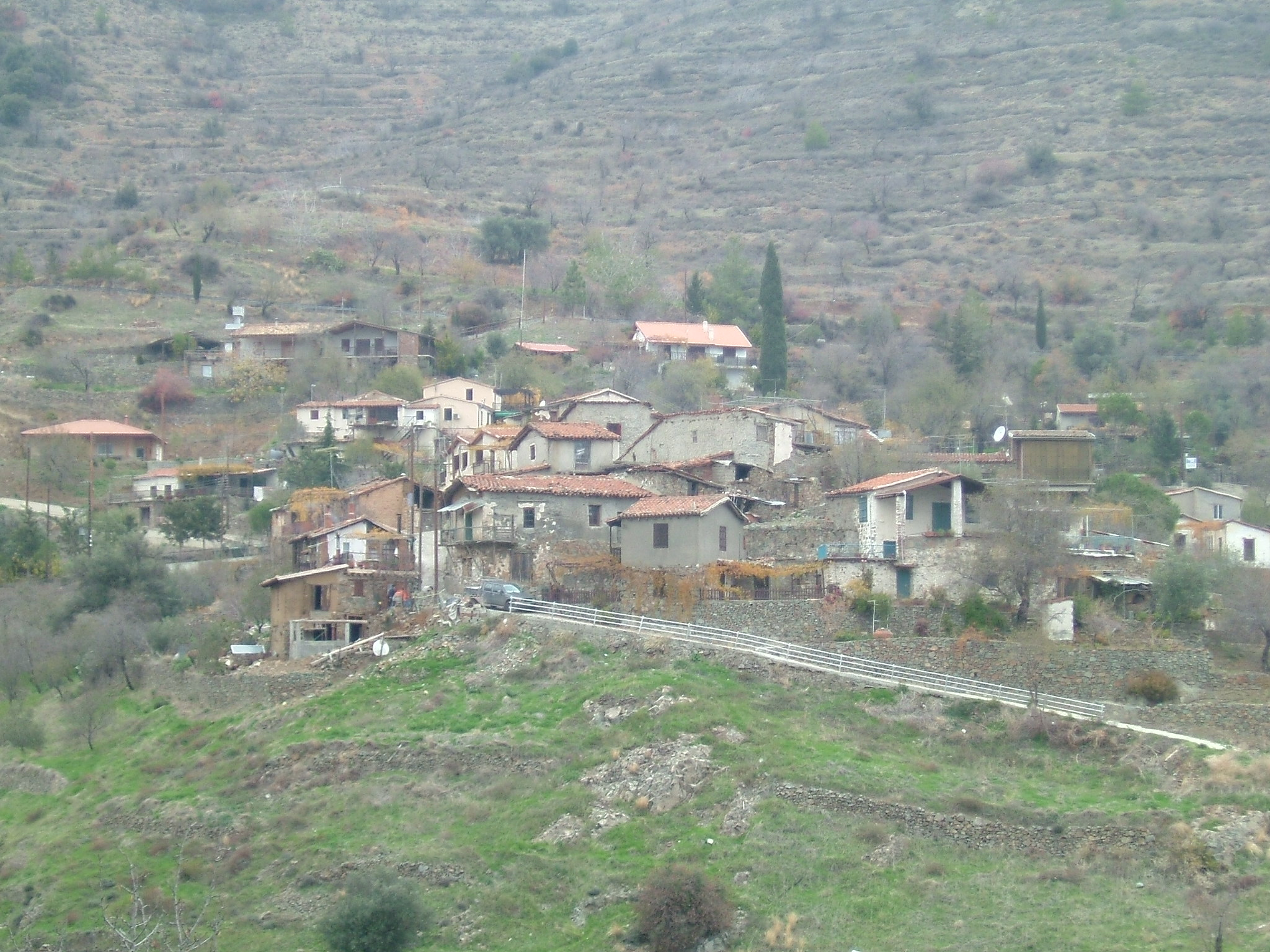

- Location in Cyprus
- Coordinates: 34°56′54″N 33°10′27″E
- Country: Cyprus
- District: Nicosia District

Population (2011)
  - Total: 39
- Time zone: UTC+2 (EET)
  - Summer (DST): UTC+3 (EEST)

Lazanias (Greek: Λαζανιάς or Λαζανιά; Turkish: Lazanya) is a village in the Nicosia District of Cyprus, located in the Machairas Forest area, southwest of Gourri.

== History ==
The creation and the name of the village are naturally connected with the foundation of the Machairas Monastery on 1160. The monks Ignatius and Procopius after securing imperial patronage of Manuel I Komnenos negotiated the resettlement of the various Machaira clans and with the Monastery's expenses were merged into the existing villages. The Lazania and other villages were given as a privilege to the new Monastery during the Komnenos dynasty. Also the Monastery had promoted several investments in the area (forest industry, agriculture, farming and mills).

During (1192-1489) the Lusignans implemented the feudal system to the island and abolished the privileges of the monastery. The village was given as a fief to some Lusignan (in Greek: Cypriot dialect Lazania). The reaction of the Orthodox population had assumed such proportions that the Franks to suppress the rebellion executed 13 monks. Based on the events that took place and the phrase “the Lazanias (= Lusignan)” took this place, hence the name of the Lazania village came to existence
