= Gialias =

Coordinates: 35°10′N 33°55′E

Gialias Γιαλιάς (in Greek) • Çakıllı Dere/Yalya Deresi (in Turkish)

Location
- Country: Cyprus

Physical characteristics
- Source
  - location: Machairas Forest, Troodos Mountains
  - elevation: 1,423 m (4,669 ft)
- Mouth
  - location: Famagusta Bay
  - elevation: 0 m (0 ft)
- Length: 88 km (55 mi)

Basin features
- Tributaries
  - left: Alikos
  - right: Koutsos

The Gialias (also Yialias; Γιαλιάς, Çakıllı Dere/Yalya Deresi) is the second longest river in Cyprus. It has a length of 88 km (55 mi), river originating in the Troodos Mountains and Mesaoria. In its course passes through the plain of Mesaoria and flows into Famagusta Bay. Its depth reaches up to 9 meters.

In 1952, the Pano Lythrodonta dam with a capacity of 32,000 m3 and a height of 10 meters was built in Gialias.

== Folk tradition ==
There are many folk traditions associated with Gialias. In the village of Nisou in the Nicosia District, it is believed that it was once divided into two to be reunited at another point, where an island was created where the name of the village comes from. Another tradition says that in the area of the village of Assia, Pedieos and Gialias were united, the countess of the area decided to separate them and bring the riverbed next to the village, to its current riverbed.

== See also ==
- List of rivers of Cyprus
