= Nisou =

Nisou: Νήσου (Greek); Dizdarköy (Turkish)
- Village
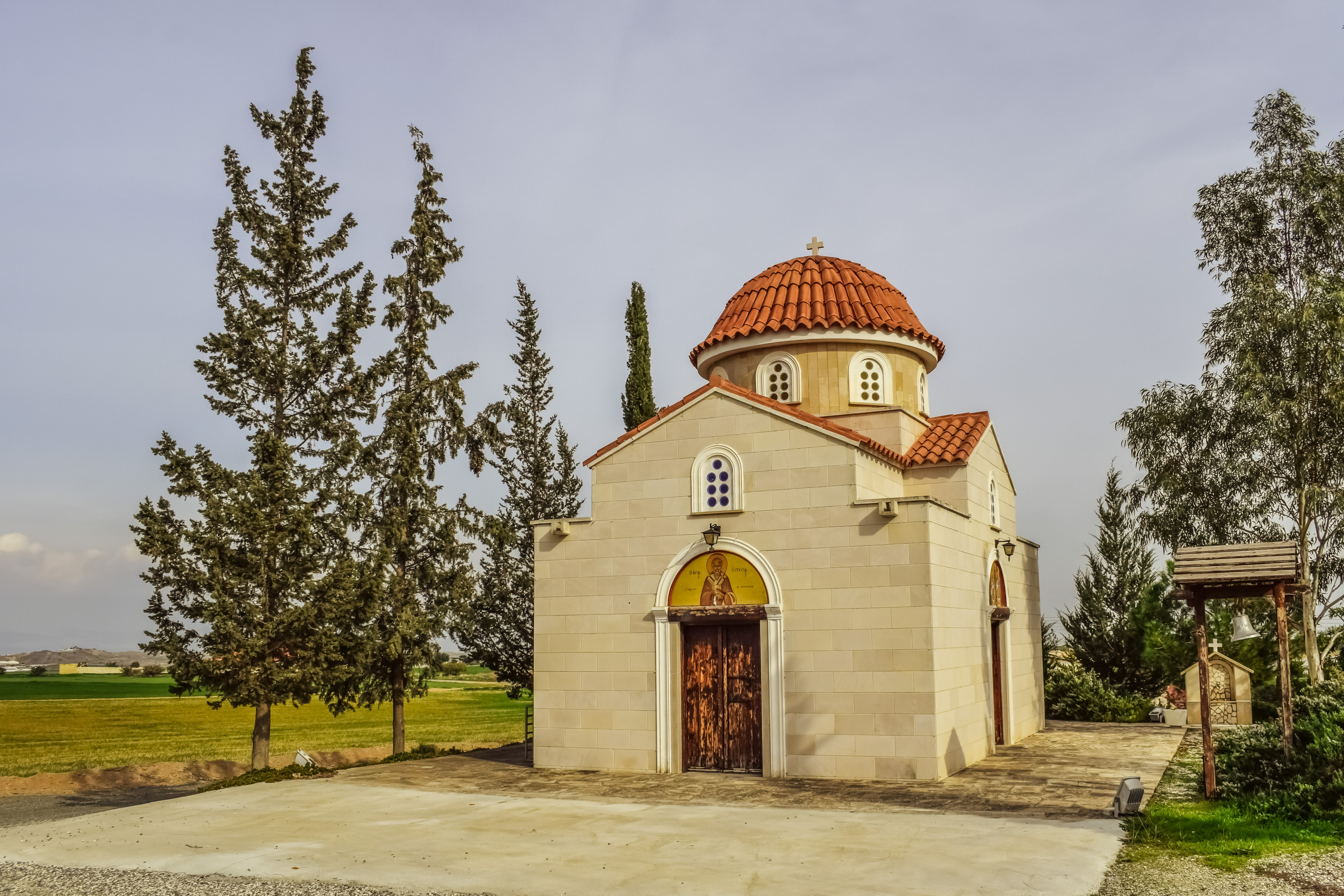

- Location in Cyprus
- Coordinates: 35°1′14″N 33°23′28″E
- Country: Cyprus
- District: Nicosia District

Population (2001)
  - Total: 1,323
- Time zone: UTC+2 (EET)
  - Summer (DST): UTC+3 (EEST)

Nisou (Greek: Νήσου; Turkish: Dizdarköy) is a village in the Nicosia District of Cyprus, just north of Pera Chorio and it is about 15 kilometres from the capital.

It is built at the north bank of the Yialias River. The old road of Nicosia-Limassol goes through the village, while the new road comes from northwest of the village.

In the older years, the village resembled a small island since it was surrounded by the Yialias River. The river would come from the mountains of Machera and would split at the Nisou area into two parts which would join again towards the East (in the Dali area). That is how it got its name Nisos or Nisou.

Nisou had historically been a mixed village, with 366 Greek Cypriots and 108 Turkish Cypriots recorded in the census of 1960. With the outbreak of inter-communal violence in 1963, the Turkish Cypriot population fled to the nearby Turkish Cypriot population centres of Louroujina and Goşşi, and their houses were destroyed. By December 1970, the Republic of Cyprus had repaired 30 of these houses at a cost of £7,000, but the displaced Turkish Cypriots did not return. All of these villagers were then resettled to various areas of Northern Cyprus after the Turkish invasion, with the highest number being in Argaki.

Following local government reform in 2024, Nisou was merged into the new municipality of South Nicosia-Idalion.
