= Analiontas =

Analiontas: Αναλιόντας (Greek); Analyonda (Turkish)
- Village
- Location in Cyprus
- Coordinates: 35°0′24″N 33°17′23″E
- Country: Cyprus
- District: Nicosia District

Area
  - Total: 10.6 km^{2} (4.1 sq mi)
- Elevation: 365 m (1,198 ft)

Population (2021)
  - Total: 551
- (443 in 2011)
- Time zone: UTC+2 (EET)
  - Summer (DST): UTC+3 (EEST)

Analiontas (Greek: Αναλιόντας (lit. 'upper lion'); Turkish: Analyonda) is a village in the Nicosia District of Cyprus, located south of Pera Orinis. The government of Analiontas has attributed both its own name, as well as that of the now-abandoned nearby village of Kataliontas, to the age of Venetian Cyprus during the 16th century, but maps from the time labeled Analiontas as Anolido. Analiontas is populated by Greek Cypriots; there was previously a minority of Turkish Cypriots, with the 1946 census recording 35 Turks and 172 Greeks, but they were evicted from the village in 1958 during the Cypriot intercommunal violence.

Τhe river Alikos passes through the village. Most of the village area is cultivated due to good rainfall, with abundant olive trees. Eucalyptus grows along the many streams, most of which are tributaries of the Alikos.
