= Machairas Forest =

Forest in Cyprus

- Μαχαιράς
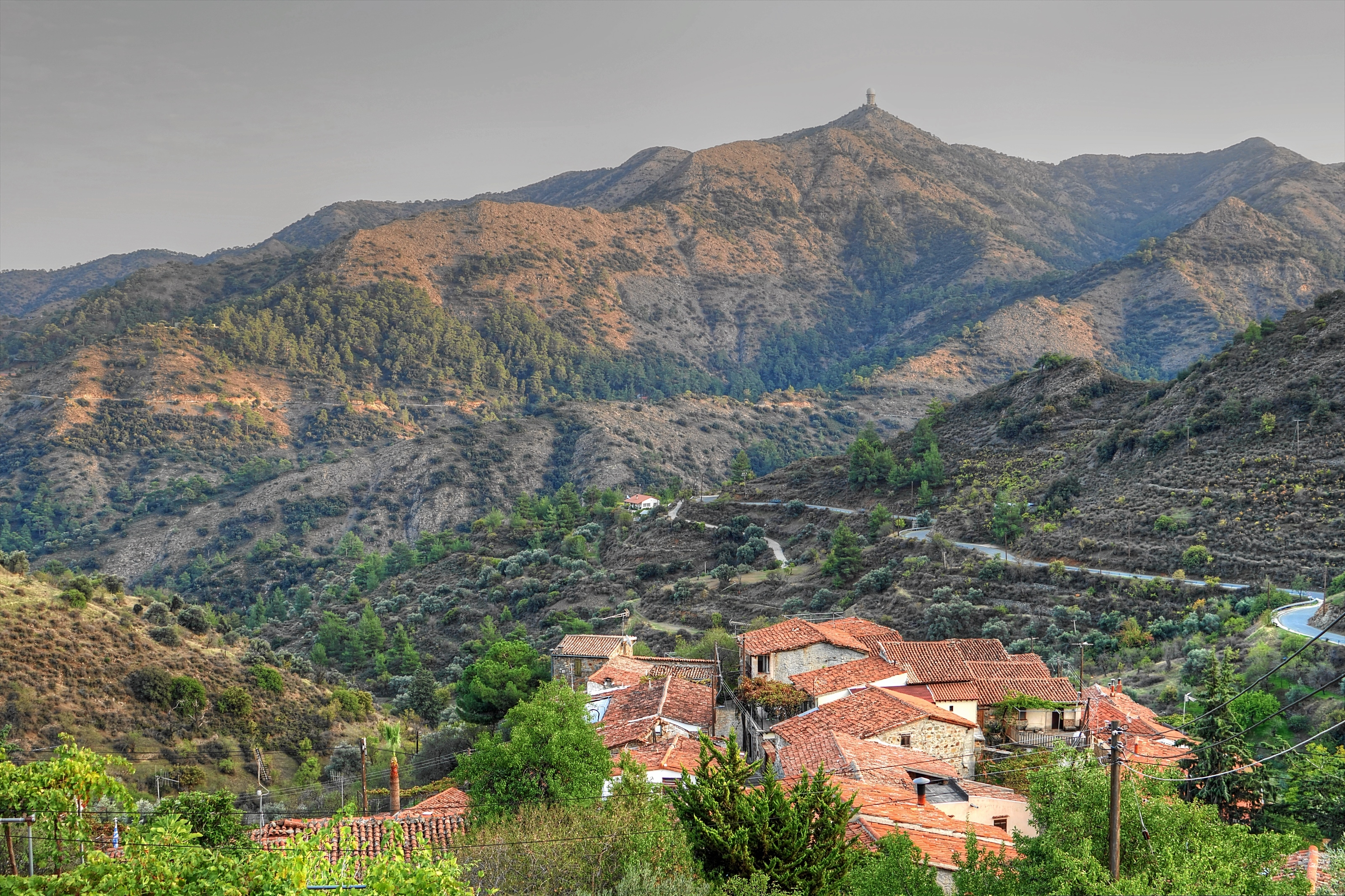
- Machairas Forest with Kionia Peak, seen from Lazanias.

- Location within Cyprus
- Location: near Lazanias, Nicosia District, Cyprus
- Coordinates: 34.9406°N 33.1909°E
- Area: 46.37 km^{2} (17.90 mi^{2})
- Established: 1885

In a general sense, the Machairas Forest is the forested area at the eastern end of the Troodos mountain range or massif in south-central Cyprus and, more specifically, it is a state forest and national park covering around 46.37 km^{2} (17.90 mi^{2}) in the northern foot-hills of Kionia Peak, the highest point in the eastern Troodos.

Machairas forest is a Mediterranean type forest consisting primarily of Calabrian pine (Pinus brutia), which is similar to the Aleppo pine, and Golden Oak (Quercus alnifolia), the national tree of Cyprus. In some areas these are mixed together and in others they occur separately.

Machairas Forest is the eastern part of the Troodos massif (an ophiolite complex). The highest point is Kionia peak at 1,423 m (4,669 ft), but to the east the forest is only 400 m (1,300 ft) high. As well as the State Forest, there is private land around Machairas Monastery. This monastery has a commanding position at the head of a wooded valley on one of the highest available slopes of Kionia Peak. The forest is named after this monastery, which itself has a name derived from the Greek word for sword or knife. Rainfall ranges from 446 mm (17.6 in) to 707 mm (27.8 in) per annum. The relief is mountainous with narrow deep valleys and high mountain peaks. The mean daily maximum temperature in August (the hottest month) is 30.5 °C (86.9 °F). Numerous streams flow from the mountains of the forest, which feed other larger streams and rivers, such as the Pediaios, the Gialias, the Maroni and the Alikos, a tributary of the Gialias.

Under the Woods and Forests Delimitation Ordnance, 1881, the Forest Delimitation Commission delimited the Machairas Forest in 1884 and in 1885 the forest within these bounds came under the protection and management of the government of Cyprus. By 1921 the total area of State Forest Lands was 678.6 mi^{2} (1,758 km^{2}) of which 15.26 mi^{2} (39.5 km^{2}) was Machairas Forest. There were at that time five main forests the largest being Paphos Forest.

Machairas was declared a "National Forest Park" in 2004 consisting of the Machairas forest (43.93 km^{2} (16.96 mi^{2})) and the Lythrodontas forest (1.31 km^{2} (0.51 mi^{2})) by decree 61.368 of 22 Dec 2004. Decree No. 62.114 of 01 Jun 2005 added the adjacent "Vounia tou Anemou" (1.126 km^{2} (0.435 mi^{2})).

Administratively, the largest part of the forest is located in the village area of Lazanias, while a smaller part extends into the administrative areas of the villages of Kapedes, Gourri and Politiko.

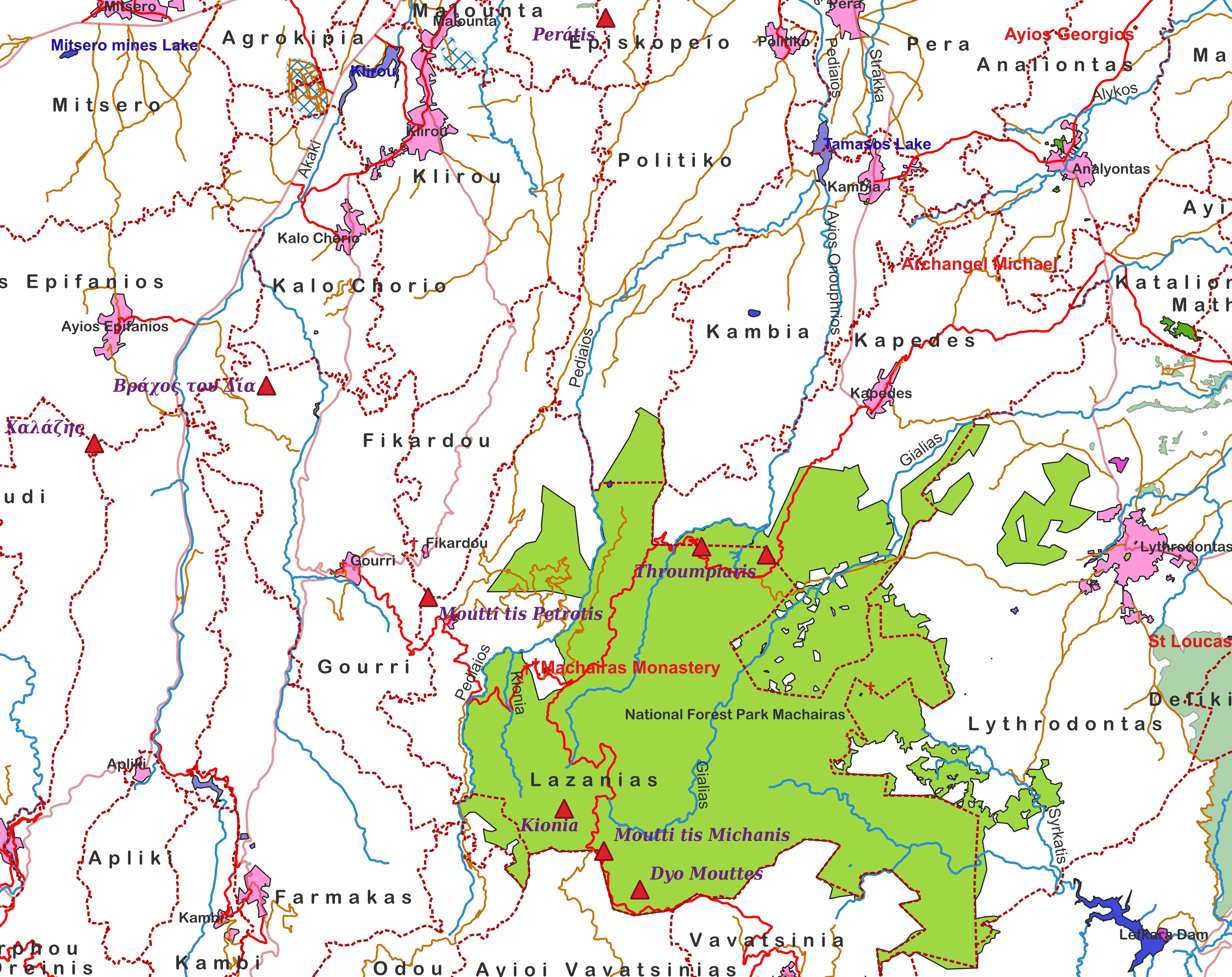
Machairas Forest
