= Strovolos River Trail =

Path for cyclists and pedestrians in Cyprus

The Strovolos River trail is a shared use path for cyclists and pedestrians in Cyprus. It is 15 km in length and runs along the Pedieos River, beginning at The English School, Nicosia in Nicosia and passing through Archangelos. Forms part of the Pedieos Linear Park, it runs along the Pedieos River and passes through the 2 Nicosia district municipalities of Strovolos and Lakatamia and it is in the process of being expanded to join with the City of Nicosia municipality. Entrances at Kasou Street, Rodou Street and Tenedou Street in Strovolos. Begins at co-ordinates 35.151175, 33.346923 in Strovolos, near the CYTA building in Strovolos Avenue.
