= Kataliontas =

Kataliontas: Kαταλιόντας (Greek); Katalyonda (Turkish)
- Village
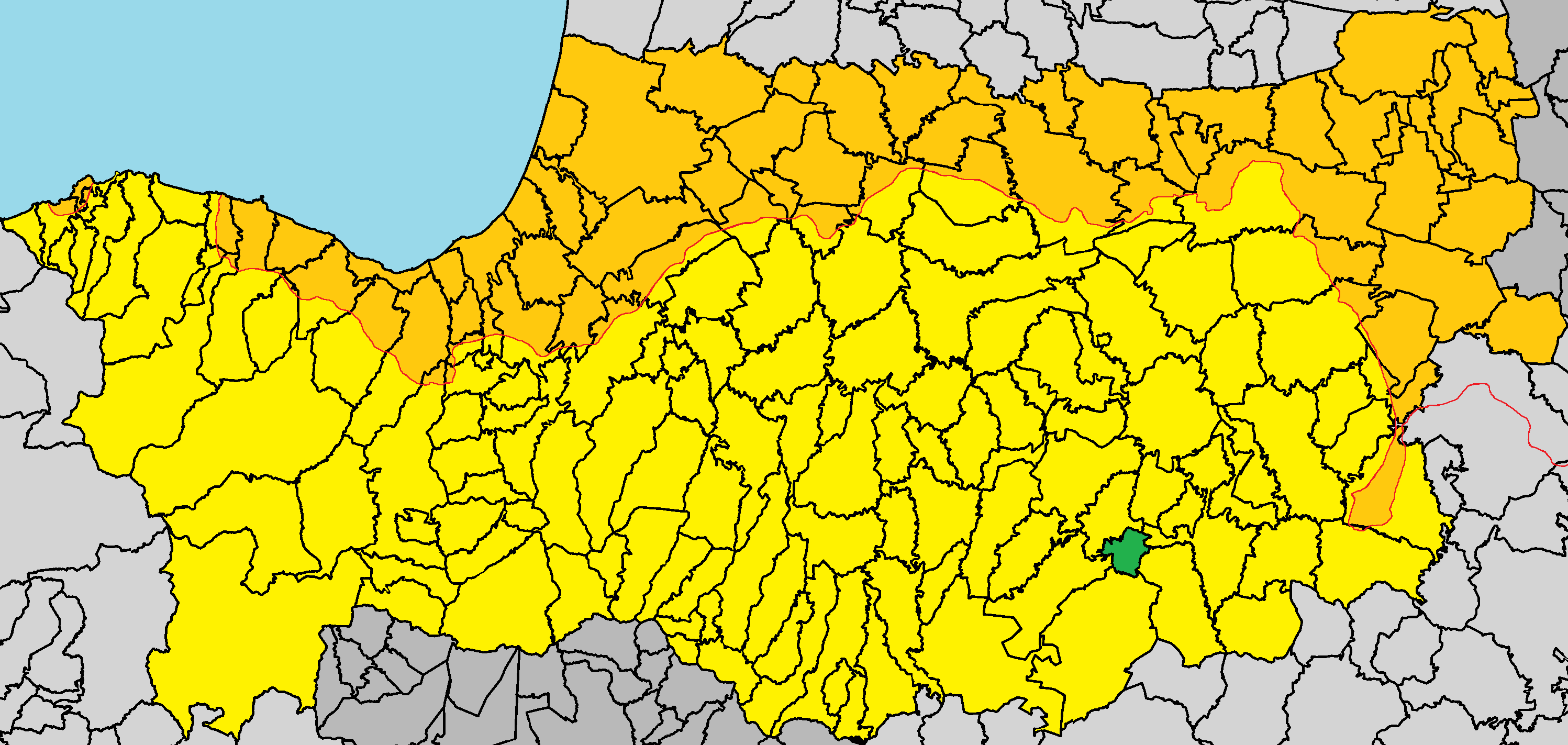

- Location in Cyprus
- Coordinates: 34°59′29″N 33°17′56″E
- Country: Cyprus
- District: Nicosia District

Population
  - Total: 0
- Time zone: UTC+2 (EET)
  - Summer (DST): UTC+3 (EEST)

Kataliontas (Greek: Καταλιόντας; Turkish: Katalyonda) was a small village in the Nicosia District of Cyprus, 2 km south of Analiontas.

Habitation in the area of Kataliontas can be traced back to the Neolithic era. The government of Analiontas has attributed both its own name and the name of Kataliontas, respectively meaning "upper lion" and "lower lion" in Greek, to the age of Venetian Cyprus, but maps from the time labeled Kataliontas as Katolido.

Kataliontas had an estimated population of 14 in 1921, all Turkish Cypriots, but in later censuses as counted together with Analiontas. Kataliontas was abandoned in 1958 during the Cypriot intercommunal violence. The remains of the village were demolished in 1977.
