= List of Cyprus islets =

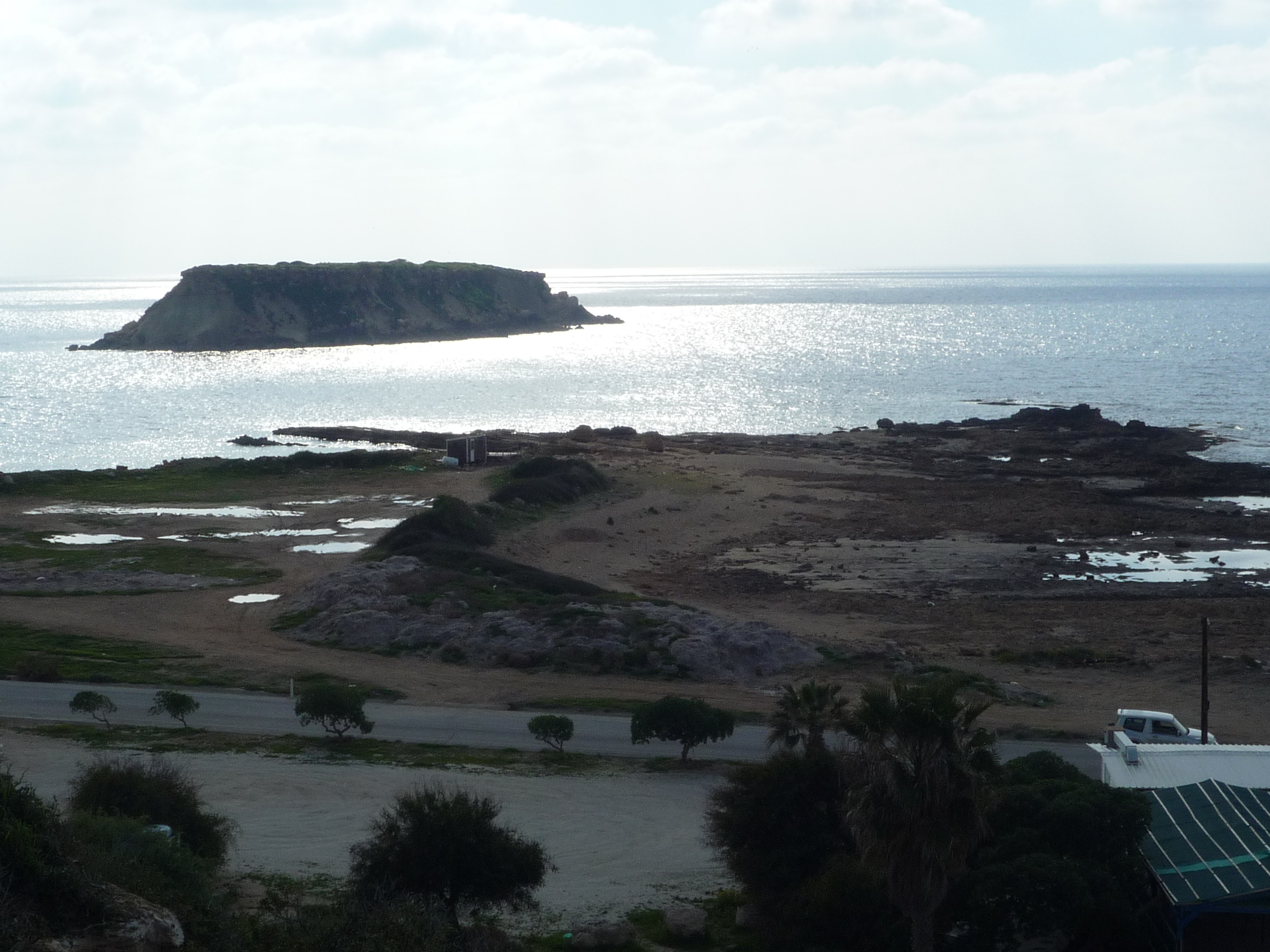
Yeronisos Islet

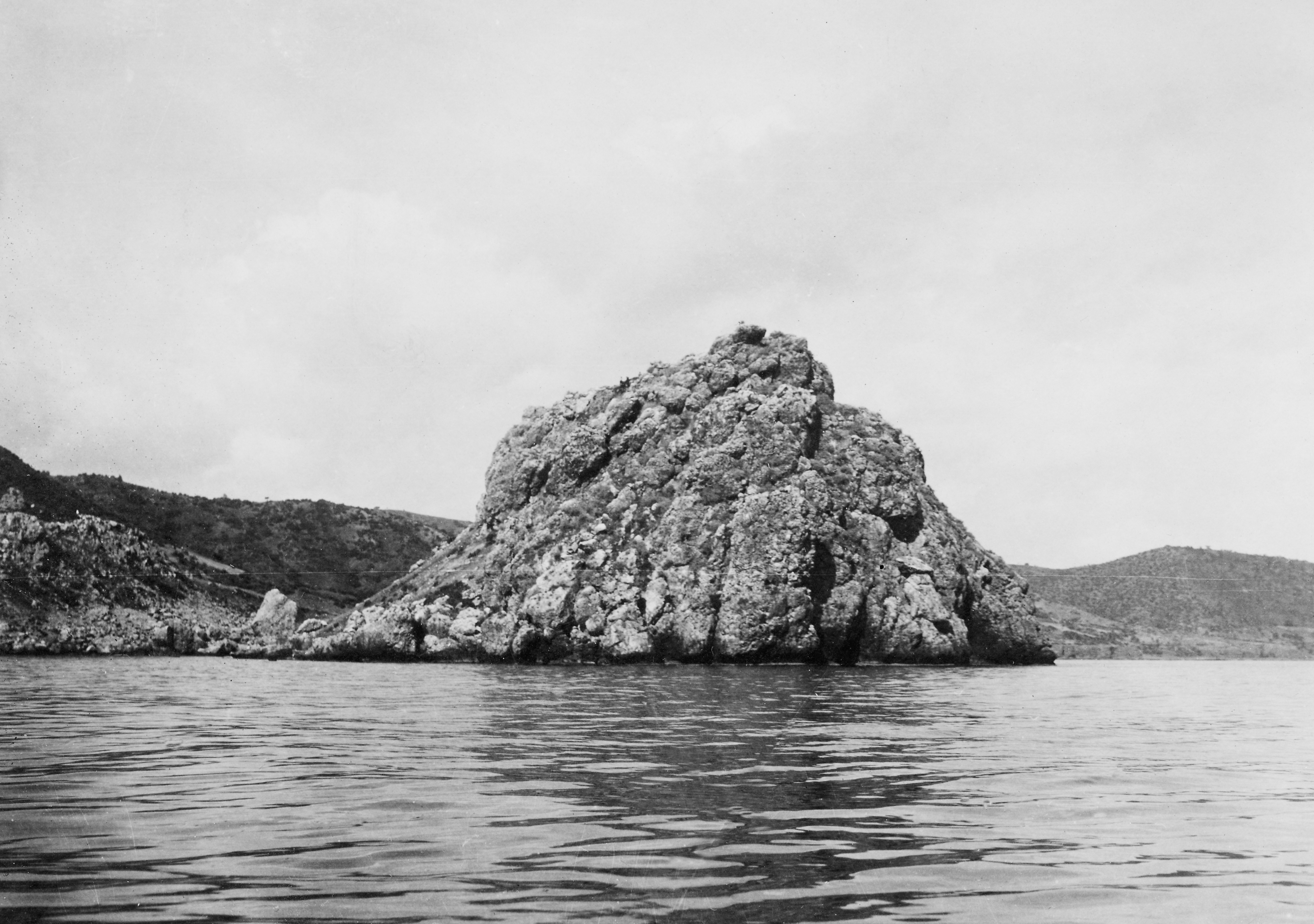
Petra Tou Limniti

This is a list of islets, islands, and rocks of the island of Cyprus (35°00′11″N 32°59′16″E).

- Ayios Georgios (Yeoryios, Nisída Agíou Georgíou), islet located in the Akamas peninsula, 35°04′29″N 32°20′03″E
- Aspro Island (Nisi Aspro), island located in the Karpasia peninsula, 35°35′19″N 34°25′27″E
- Dhemoniaris, island located in the Karpasia peninsula, 35°33′25″N 34°10′16″E
- Galounia, islet located in the Karpasia peninsula
- Glaros (Nisída Gláros), islet located in the Karpasia peninsula, 35°39′22″N 34°26′38″E
- Glykiotissa (Nisída Glykiótissa), island located in Kyrenia region, 35°20′57″N 33°17′30″E
- Kleides Islands, rocky islets at the north, 35°42′24″N 34°36′12″E
- Khamili (Nisída tis Chamilís), islet located in the Akamas peninsula, 35°05′02″N 32°18′28″E
- Jila (Nisída Kíla), island located in the Karpasia peninsula, 35°30′19″N 34°19′30″E
- Kalamoulia (Nisída tis Chamilís), islet located near Karavas, 35°05′02″N 32°18′28″E
- Kannoudhia (Nisída Kannoúdia), islet located in the Akamas peninsula, 35°02′16″N 32°16′20″E
- Kemathion, islet located in the Karpasia peninsula
- Khoti (Nisída Chotí), islet located next to Ayios Amvrosios, 35°21′03″N 33°32′51″E
- Kionos (Nisída Kióni), islet located in the Akamas peninsula, 35°01′27″N 32°16′28″E
- Koppo (Nisída Kóppos), islet located in the Akamas peninsula, 35°01′39″N 32°16′47″E
- Kordhylia (Nisídes Kordýlia), island located in the Karpasia peninsula, 35°40′44″N 34°31′59″E
- Kormakitis (Nisída Kormakítis), islet located in the cape Kormakitis, 35°24′18″N 32°55′13″E
- Koutisopetri, islet located in the Karpasia peninsula
- Koutoulis, islet located in the Karpasia peninsula, 35°33′09″N 34°10′17″E
- Lefkonisos (Nisída Lefkónisos), islet located in the Karpasia peninsula, 35°38′51″N 34°25′14″E
- Mazaki (Nisída Mazáki), island located in the Akamas peninsula, 35°06′43″N 32°16′52″E
- Maniji (Manikis), islets located near Peyia, 34°53′16″N 32°19′21″E
- Moulia (Vráchoi Mouliá), rocks located near Paphos, 34°43′24″N 32°26′09″E
- Nisarka (Nissaria), islet located near Paphos, 34°50′47″N 32°22′31″E
- Nisha (Nichchia), islet located in the Karpasia peninsula, 35°34′47″N 34°16′51″E
- Palloura, point located in the Karpasia peninsula, 35°21′24″N 34°04′50″E
- Petra Tou Limniti, islet located next to Pyrgos, 35°10′53″N 32°44′17″E
- Petra Tou Romiou, rocks located near Kouklia, 34°39′49″N 32°37′38″E
- Scales (Nisída Skáles), islet located in the Karpasia peninsula, 35°28′17″N 34°02′00″E
- Sernos (Chernos), islet located in the Karpasia peninsula, 35°28′33″N 34°02′45″E
- Skaloudhia (Nisídes Skaloúdia), island located in the Karpasia peninsula, 35°33′50″N 34°11′02″E
- Skamni, islet located in the Karpasia peninsula, 35°32′37″N 34°09′56″E
- Vatha, islet located south to Limassol
- Yeronisos, island located near Peyia, 34°53′59″N 32°18′42″E
- Yeronisos, islet located near Karavas

== See also ==
- List of islands of Greece
