= Gourri =

Gourri: Γούρρι (Greek); Gurri (Turkish)
- village
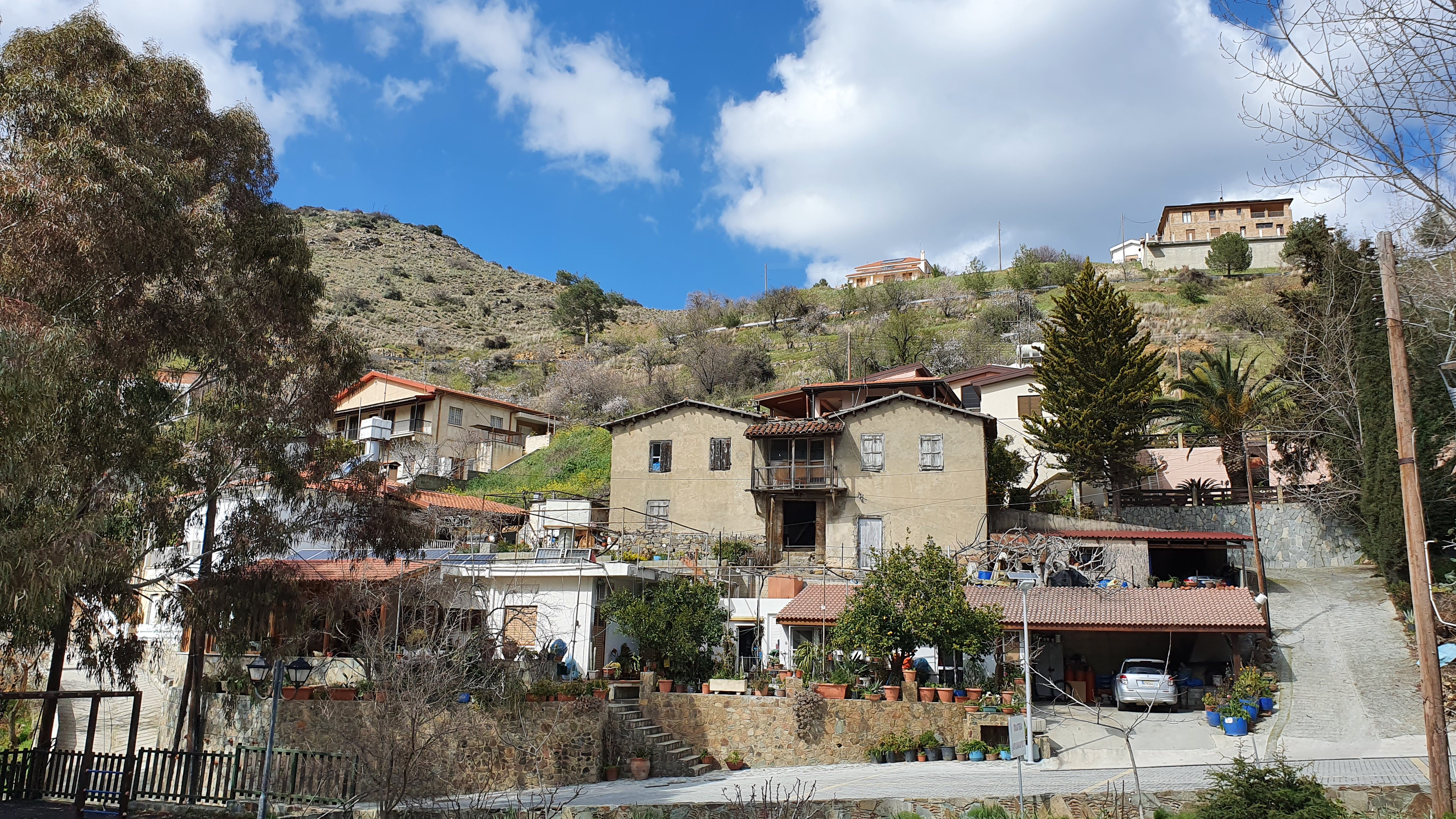

- Location in Cyprus
- Coordinates: 34°57′26″N 33°9′25″E
- Country: Cyprus
- District: Nicosia District

Population (2001)
  - Total: 225
- Time zone: UTC+2 (EET)
  - Summer (DST): UTC+3 (EEST)

Gourri (Greek: Γούρρι; Turkish: Gurri) is a village in the Nicosia District of Cyprus, found on a rough side at the foothill of the Machaira mountain, in the geographical region of Pitsilia. The village is located 10 km south of Klirou, 36 km from Nicosia.

== History ==
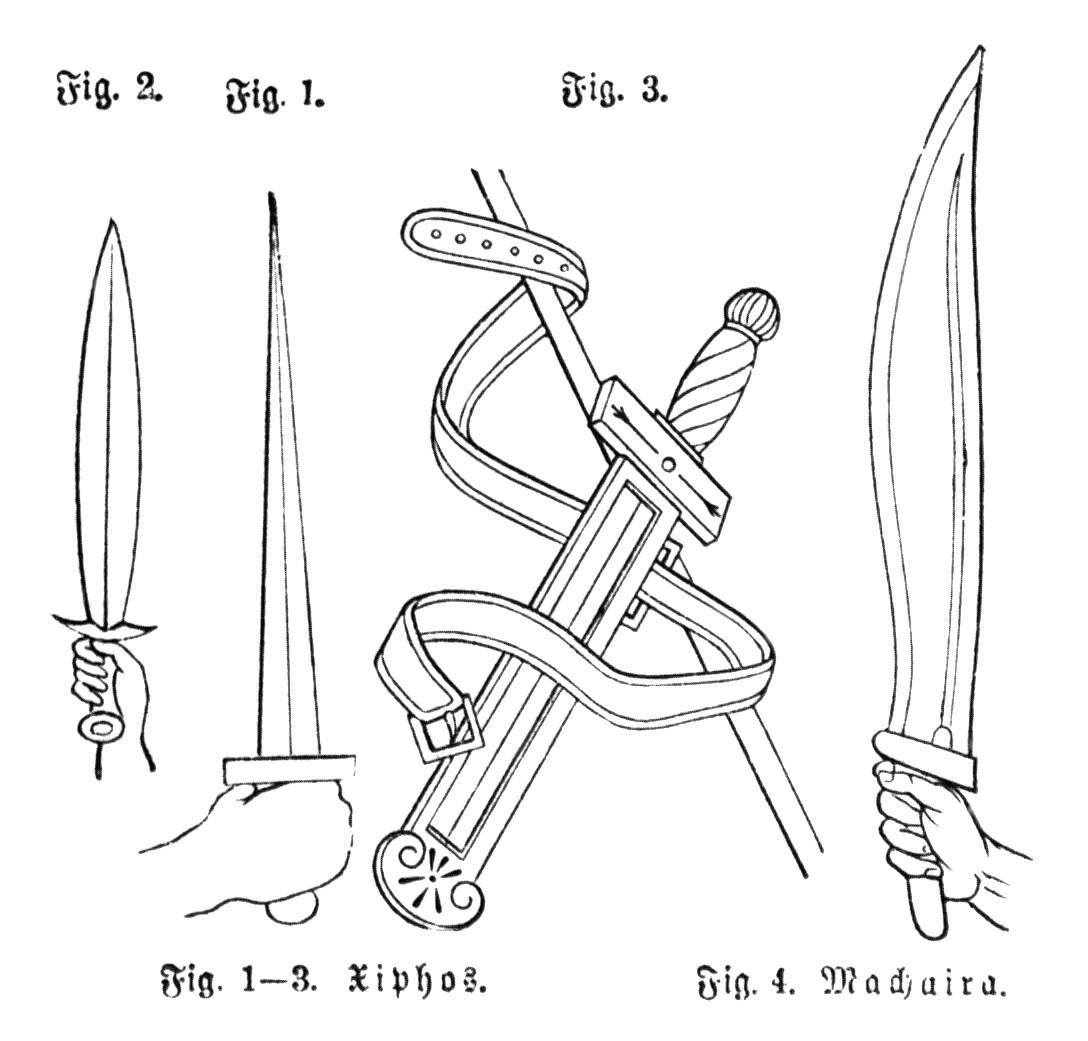
Antique swords, fig. 1–3: Xiphos, fig. 4: Makhaira.

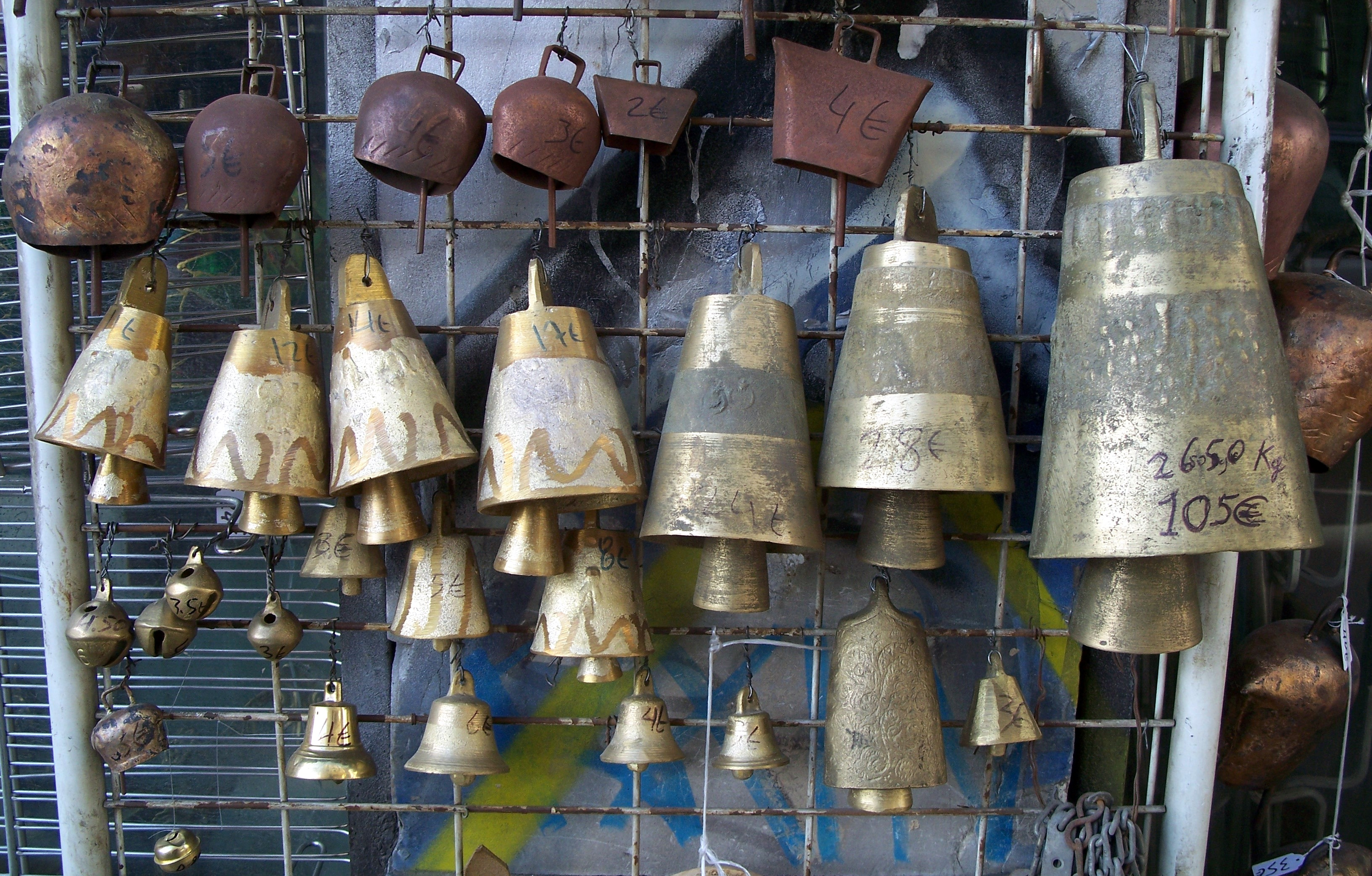
Greek livestock bells

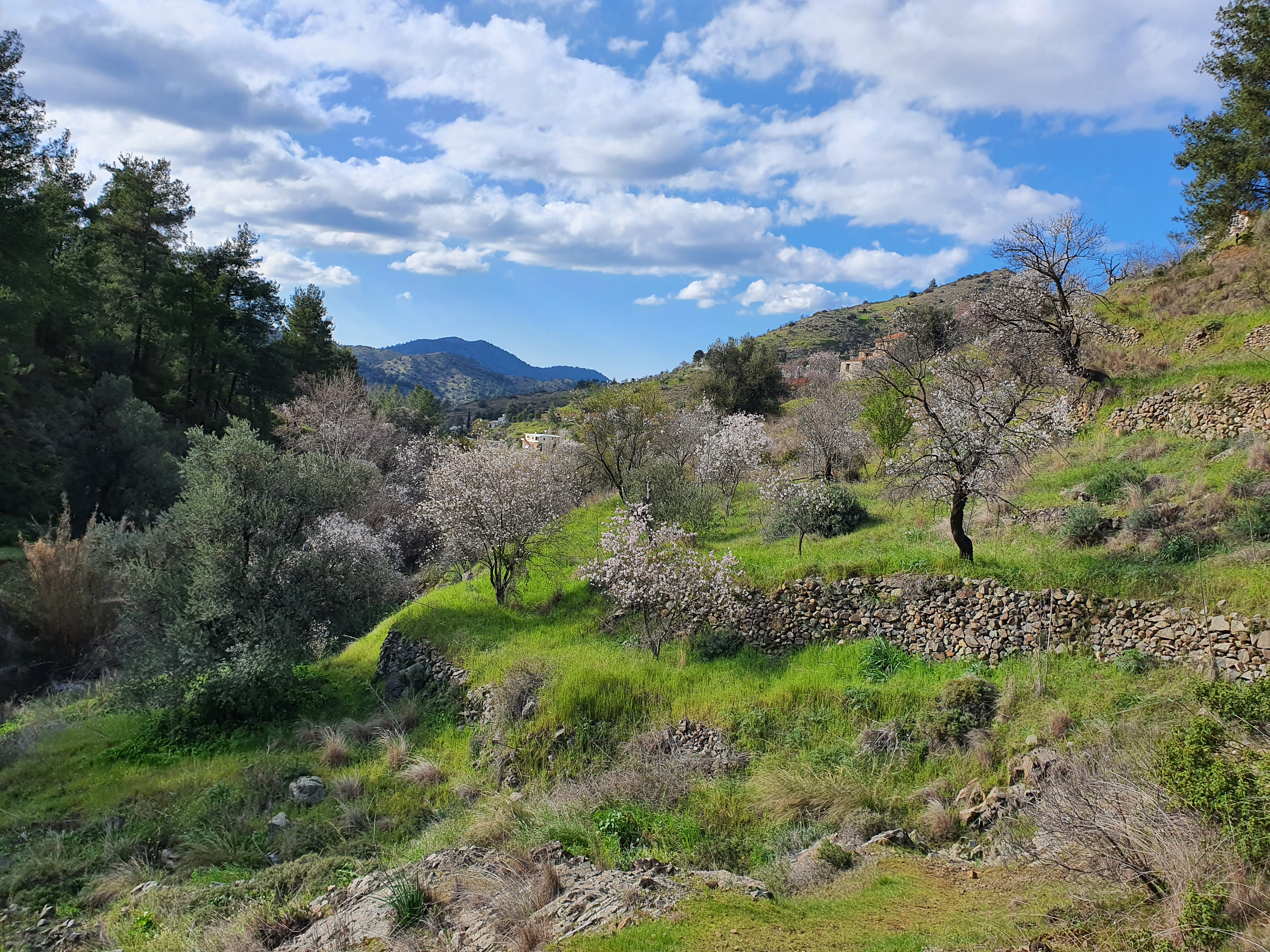
Area between village and waterfall

The village name came into existence at around 800 AD after a general amnesty pardon of all dissidents and fugitive outlaws on the island. From the 5th to the 8th century there was a lot of turmoil in the islands history. Earthquakes, anti-Pagan laws and Arab invasions caused dissidents and refugee groups to form in Clans, in the inaccessible valleys and peaks of Troodos Mountains, in order to avoid oppression. There they established the rule of the sword as basic tool of survival. Hence the name of the mountain Makhaira originates from these clans fighting ability. One of these clans was the Kourries, originated by dissident's fugitives from Kourion area. The Kourries were in control of the East side of the mountain. Gourri village name is taken from the Kourries’ clan.

In Komnenos dynasty (1081–1185), the Gouri and other villages were given as a privilege to Machairas Monastery. The various clans were merged into the existing communities and the new monastery had invested "for the benefit of communities", in production of agricultural tools, "ploughs, saddles, and livestock bells."

During the Frankish period (1192–1489) the Knights Templar implemented the feudal system to the island and abolished the privileges of the monastery. The locals had rebelled and Franks, in order to suppress the rebellion, applied the (military feudalism) Commandry (feudalism) in the village and generally in Pitsilia. The uprising resulted in the execution of 13 monks and the complete destruction of the villages Rogkia and Kalamithasa as other small settlements.

This was the first time that Gourri and Pitsilia territory were occupied militarily.

== Sources ==
- A History of the Crusades: vol. 3 by Harry w. Hazart
