= Cypriot Sign Language =

Pidgin sign language of Cyprus

- Κυπριακή νοηματική γλώσσα
- Native to: Cyprus
- Language family: pidgin

Language codes
- ISO 639-3: None (mis)
- Glottolog: None
- IETF: gss-CY

Cyprus or Cypriot Sign Language (Greek: Κυπριακή Νοηματική Γλώσσα, romanized: Kypriakí Noimatikí Glóssa) is an incipient sign language of Cyprus. It appears to be a pidgin of American Sign Language and Greek Sign Language, not yet a fully developed language. The Greek Cypriot deaf community predominantly uses the Greek Sign Language.
