= Pedieos =

Coordinates: 35°10′N 33°55′E

Pedieos Πεδιαίος/Πιθκιάς (in Greek) Kanlı Dere (in Turkish)
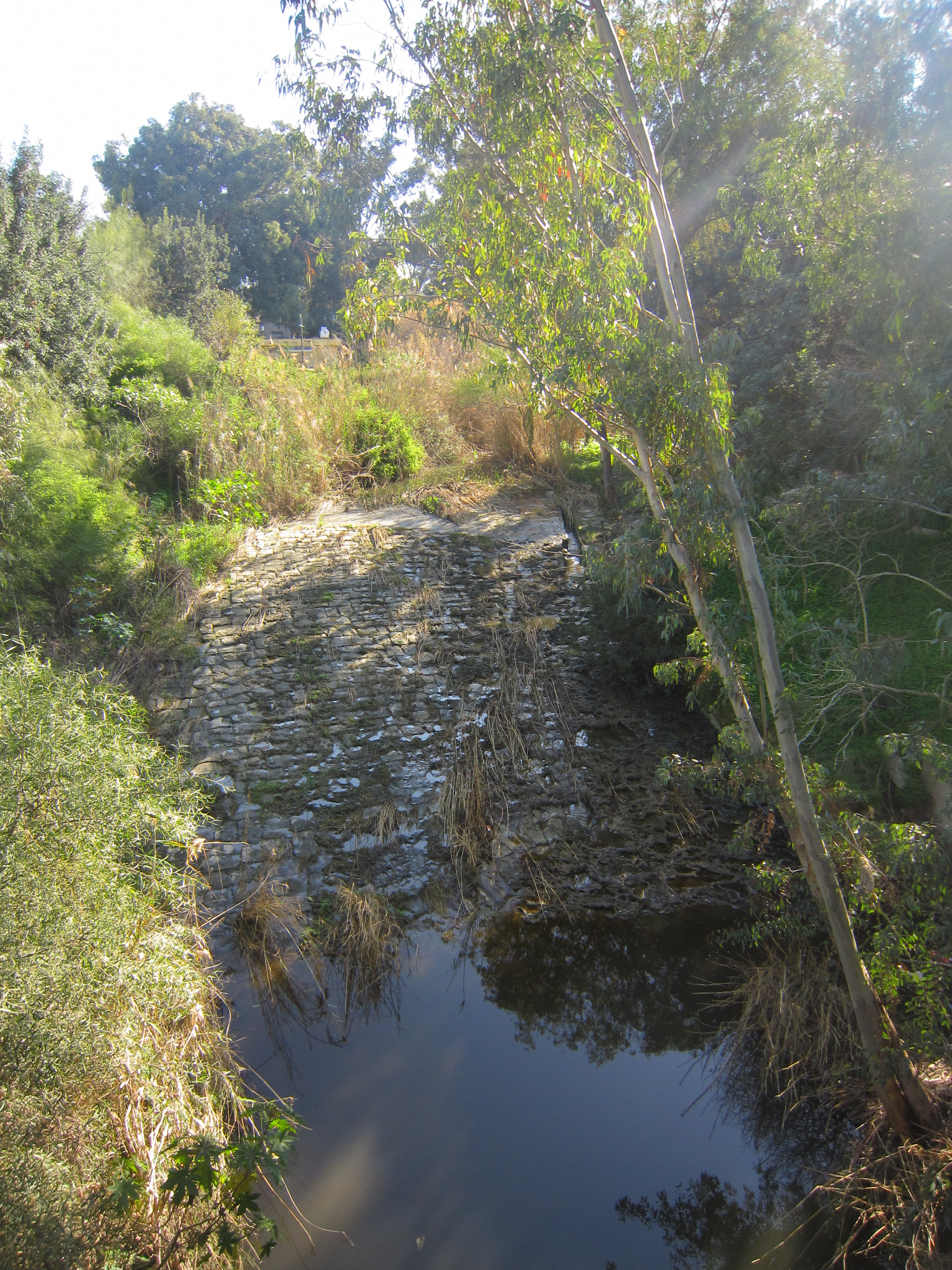

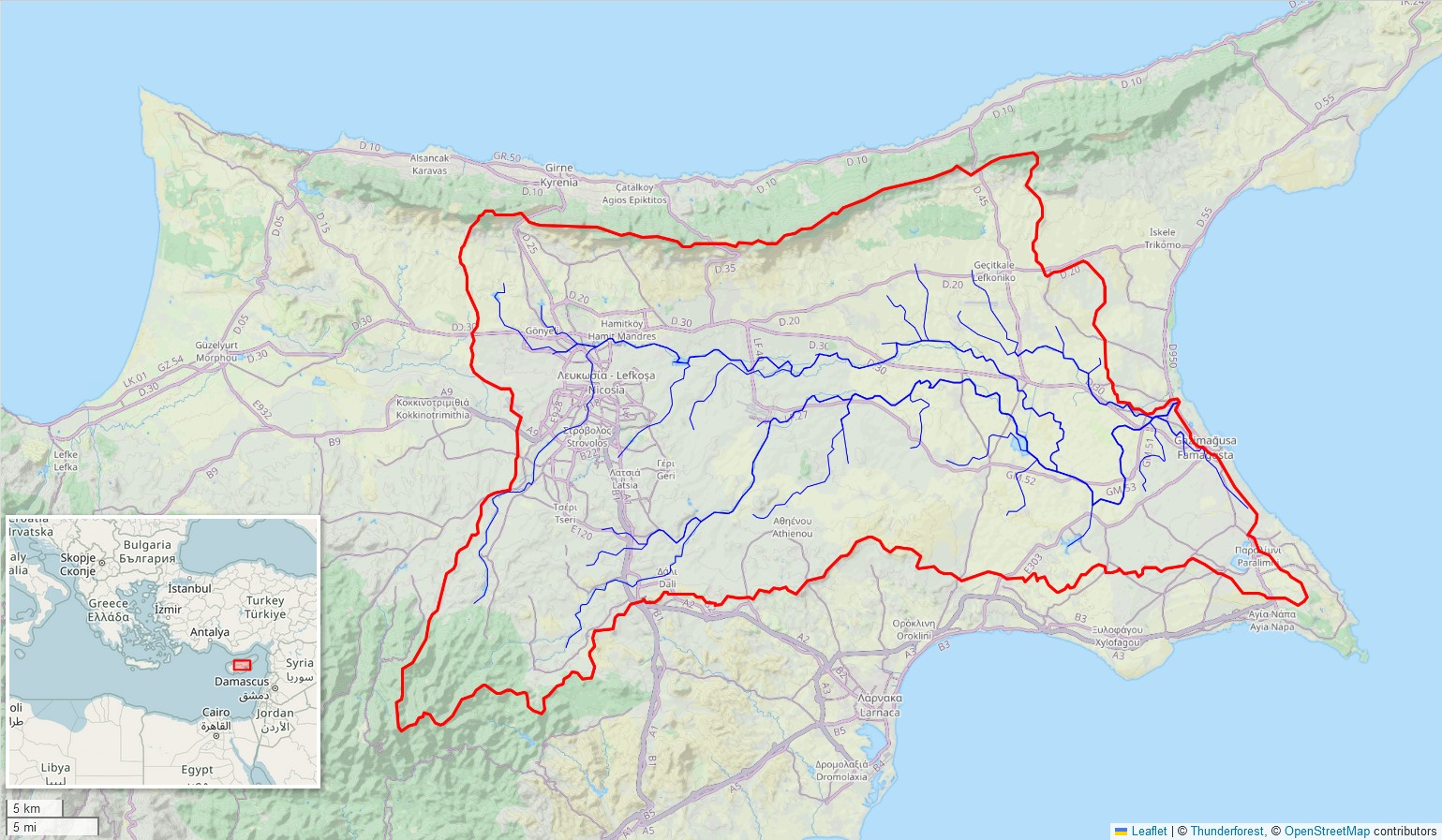
- Pedieos River watershed (Interactive map)

Location
- Country: Cyprus

Physical characteristics
- Source
  - location: Troodos Mountains
- Mouth
  - location: Famagusta Bay
  - coordinates: 35.16, 33.91
  - elevation: 0 m (0 ft)
- Length: 98 km (61 mi)
- Basin size: 2,000 km^{2}

The Pedieos (also Pediaios or Pediaeus or Pithkias; Greek: Πεδιαίος/Πηθκιάς, Turkish: Kanlı Dere) is the longest river in Cyprus. The river originates in the Machairas Forest in the Troodos Mountains close to Machairas Monastery and flows northeast across the Mesaoria plains, through the capital city Nicosia. It then steers east, meeting the sea at Famagusta Bay close to the ancient Greek city of Salamis. Maximum depth is 10 meters.

The river has a total length of 98 km. An 18 km stretch of the river banks, in and around Nicosia, has been turned into pedestrian walkways.

There are two dams constructed along the river, the largest one at Tamassos built in 2002.

== See also ==
- List of rivers of Cyprus
- Strovolos River Trail
