= List of rivers of Cyprus =

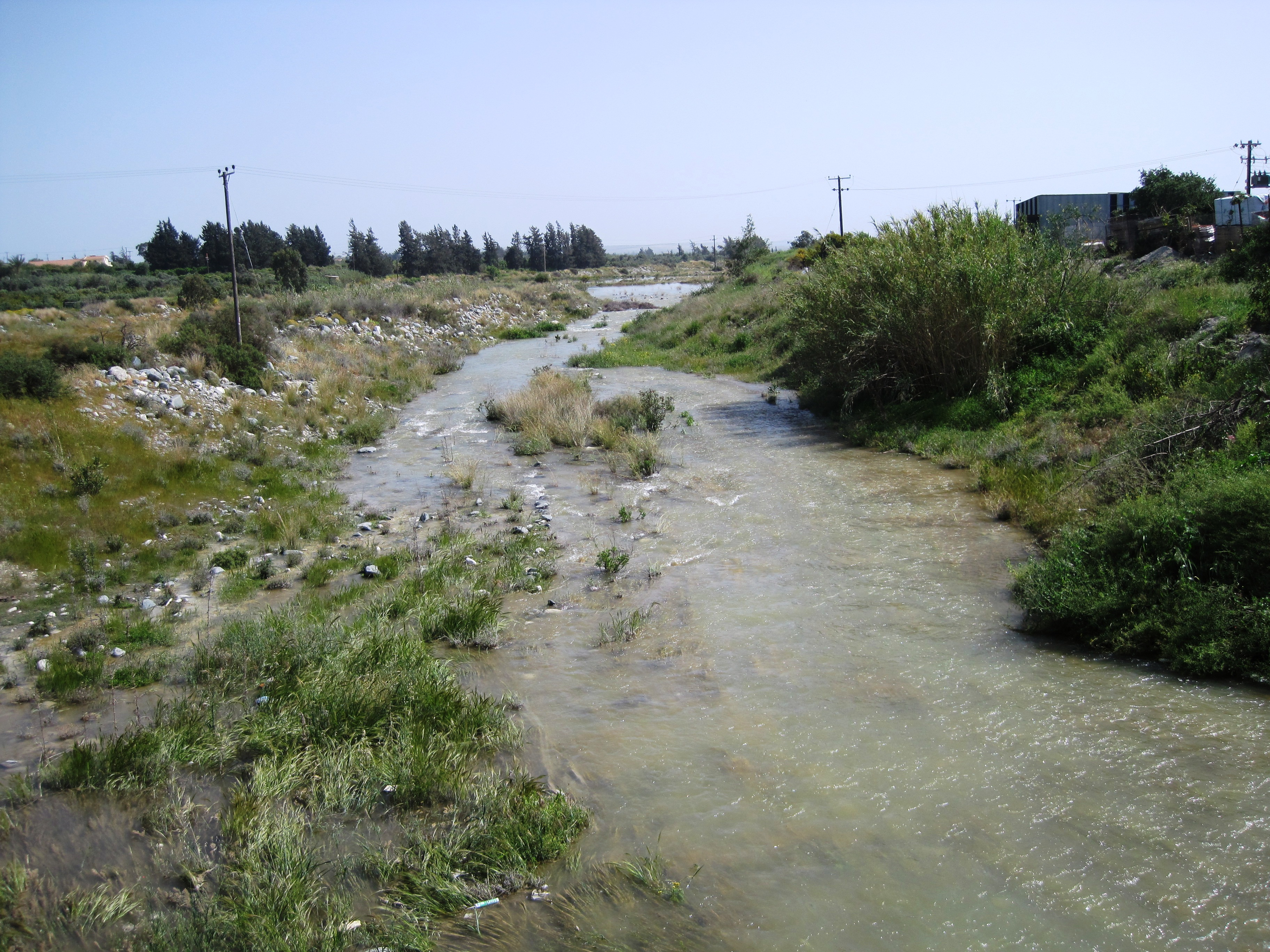
The Kouris river

Most of the 35 rivers and streams in Cyprus are small and impermanent. Melting snow supplies water to a number of these until late April. Others are merely winter torrents which go dry during the summer.

== Rivers ==
No.	River	Name in Greek	Name in Turkish	Length
1	Pedieos	Πεδιαίος / Πηδιάς	Kanlıdere	105 kilometres (65 mi)
2	Gialias	Γιαλιάς	Çakıllıdere (Yayladere)	88
3	Serakhis	Σερράχης	Serahi	55
4	Diarizos	Διαρίζος	Diyariza (Diyarizo)	42
5	Xeropotamos	Ξεροπόταμος	Kurudere	41.5
6	Ezousa	Έζουσα	Ezusa	41
7	Kouris	Κούρης	Kuris	38
8	Akaki	Ακάκι	Akaki	Unknown
9	Ha Potami	Χαποτάμι	Hapotami	Unknown
10	Peristerona	Περιστερώνα	Persiterona	Unknown
11	Ovgos	Οβγός	Dardere	Unknown
12	Tremithos	Τρέμιθος		Unknown
13	Elia	Ελιά	Doğancı	Unknown
14	Stavros tis Psokas	Σταυρός της Ψώκας		Unknown
15	Pentashinos	Πεντάσχοινος	Pendaşino (Beştulum)	Unknown
16	Karkotis	Καρκώτης	Karkot	Unknown
17	Vasilikos	Βασιλικός		32
18	Maroni	Μαρώνι		Unknown
19	Yermasogeia	Γερμασόγεια	Yermasoya	Unknown
20	Atsas	Ατσάς	Atsas	Unknown
21	Limnatis	Λιμνάτης		Unknown
22	Krios	Κρυός		Unknown
23	Alikos	Αλυκός		31.3
24	Garillis	Γαρύλλης	Garilis	Unknown
25	Setrahos	Σέτραχος		Unknown
26	Limnitis	Λιμνίτης	Yeşilırmak	Unknown
