= Famagusta Bay =

Body of water in eastern Cyprus

Coordinates: 35°10′N 34°00′E

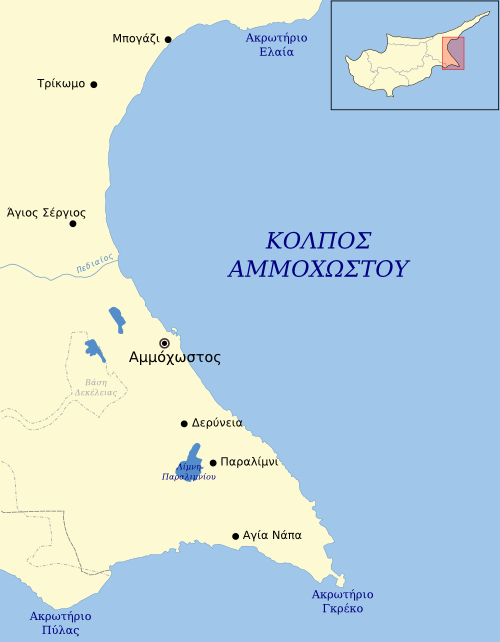

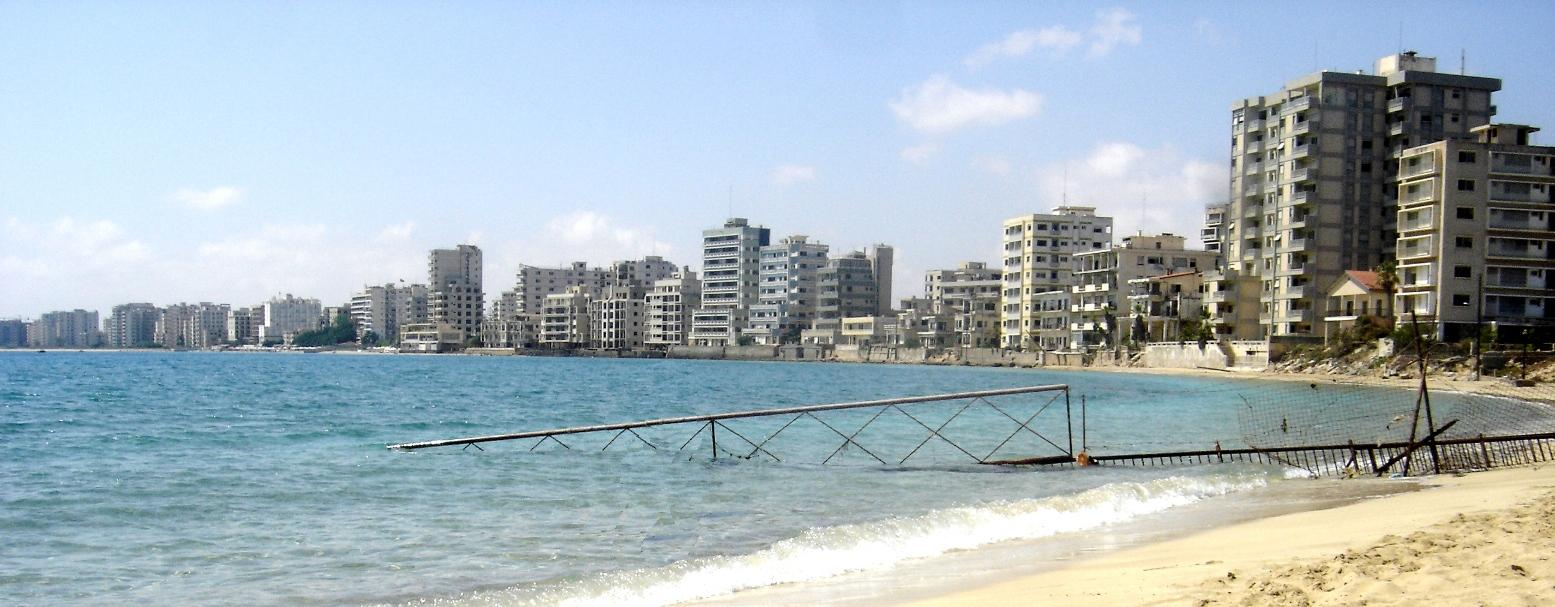

Famagusta Bay (Greek: Κόλπος της Αμμοχώστου, Turkish: Mağusa Körfezi) is the easternmost body of water that is formed by the Karpasia peninsula and Protaras. It is named after the city of Famagusta, which lies almost right in the middle of the bay. The ancient city-state of Salamis also is found on the bay, north of Famagusta. It is known for the best sandy beaches in Cyprus, which stretch for miles.
