= Machairas Monastery =

12th-century monastery in Cyprus

Machairas
- Μαχαιράς
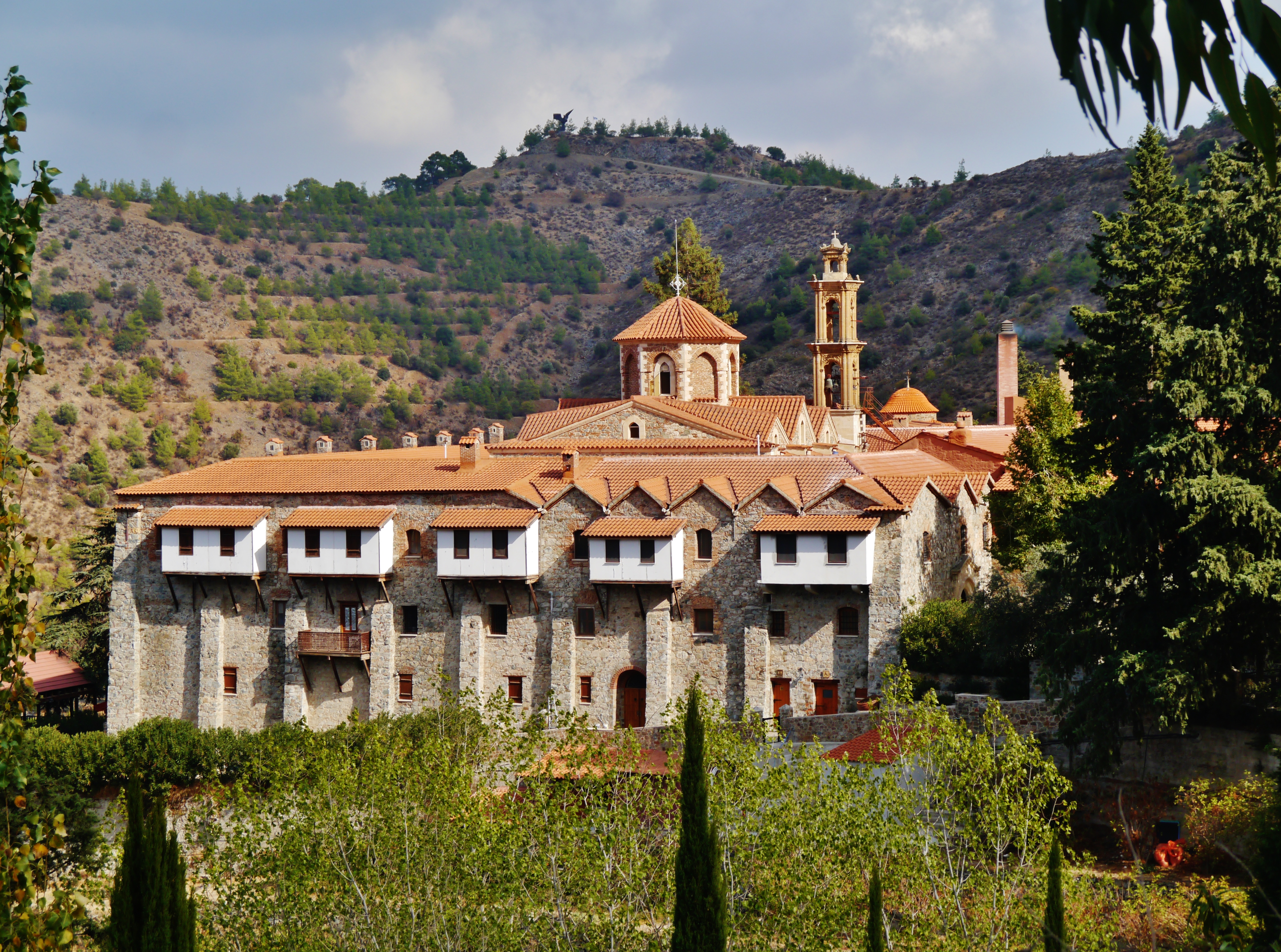
- Machairas Monastery

- Location within Cyprus
- Interactive map of Machairas

Monastery information
- Full name: The Holy, Royal and Stavropegic Monastery of Machairas
- Order: Orthodox monasticism
- Established: 12th century
- Dedication: Virgin Mary
- Celebration: 21 November
- Diocese: Church of Cyprus

People
- Founder: Manuel I Komnenos
- Prior: Epiphanios, Bishop of Ledra

Architecture
- Style: Byzantine

Site
- Location: near Lazanias, Nicosia District
- Country: Cyprus
- Coordinates: 34.9406°N 33.1909°E

Machairas Monastery (Greek: Μαχαιράς [locally [maʃeˈɾas]]) is a historic monastery dedicated to the Virgin Mary located about 40 km from the capital of Cyprus, Nicosia. It lies at an altitude of about 900 m and was founded at the end of the 12th century close to the current village of Lazanias, in the Machairas Forest.

== History ==
Legend has it that an unknown hermit smuggled one of the 70 icons said to have been painted by Luke the Apostle secretly from Asia Minor to Cyprus. This icon of the Virgin Mary remained in its hiding place until the arrival of two other hermits from Palestine in 1145: Neophytos and Ignatius who stumbled across the icon in a cave. To reach it, they had to machete their way into the cave through the thick plant growth, so the icon assumed the name 'Machairotissa' in reference to the Greek word for knife μαχαίρι (Makhaira). The whole monastery founded on this site takes its name from this icon.

Following the death of Neophytos, Ignatios travelled with Prokopios (another hermit) to Constantinople in the year 1172 where they succeeded in obtaining financial assistance from the then Byzantine emperor Manuel I Komnenos. The monastery was also granted ownership of the entire mountain on which it is now situated and the status of stavropegion (meaning it remained independent of the area bishopric). The initial monastery was then enlarged by the monk Neilos in the early 13th century. He became the first abbot of the monastery (later he even became bishop of Tamassos). The monastery received further grants from two other Byzantine emperors: Emperor Isaac II Angelos granted cash and land in Nicosia and Emperor Alexios III Angelos donated 24 serfs. The monastery was sustained great damage within the fire in 1892. So, archimandrite Chariton travelled to Russian Empire to gain donations for the reconstruction of the monastery. He managed to collect 6 483 rubles. There is a small museum within the territory of the monastery. The museum is dedicated to Grigoris Afxentiou, a Greek Cypriot insurgent leader who participated in EOKA's campaigns during the Cyprus Emergency. Afxentiou was killed in action on 3 March 1957 in his secret hideout near the monastery.

== Architecture ==
The monastery has a rectangular layout and a red-tiled timber roof. The main entrance faces towards the east; a second faces due west. The supporting buildings and monks' cells are built around a centrally located church designed in Byzantine style. The main aisle of the church is lined with a row of columns. It is covered by a dome and the large tiled roof. The interior of the church is decorated with religious icons, chandeliers, stone floors and wall frescoes. The icon of the Virgin Mary takes a prominent position.

Currently, the monastery holds 20–30 Orthodox monks who live off of agricultural activities.

== Festivals ==
The monastery is dedicated to the Virgin Mary and officially celebrates the feast of the Entrance of the Virgin Mary to the Temple (Eisodia) on 21 November.
