= Paul Åström =

20th-century Swedish archaeologist and classical scholar

Paul Åström (January 15, 1929 – October 4, 2008) was a Swedish archaeologist and classical scholar. He was a professor at the University of Gothenburg and director of the Swedish institutes in Athens and Rome. He is mostly known for his achievements in the prehistoric archaeology of Cyprus.

== Biography ==
Åström was born at Sundsvall in Västernorrland County, Sweden. Åström earned a Master of Philosophy in 1951 and Doctor of Philosophy in 1958 at Lund University. Åström started his academic career as a student of Axel W. Persson (1888-1951) at Uppsala University and subsequently became a student of Einar Gjerstad (1898-1988) where he received his doctoral degree. His dissertation was called The Middle Cypriote Bronze Age and dealt mostly with the ceramics of that time period.

In 1958 he became the director of the Swedish Institute at Athens where he remained until 1963. Then he taught at University of Missouri (1963-1964) and became the director of the Swedish Institute at Rome (1967-1969). In 1969 he took up a professorship in ancient culture and social life at the University of Gothenburg. He was dean of the historical-philosophical section 1974-1980 and for the Faculty of Humanities 1975-1980 prior to his retirement from the university in 1993.

Åström participated in a number of excavations, including in Turkish Labranda in 1950, in Kalopsida and Agios Iacovos in Cyprus in 1959, in Dendra on several occasions during the 1960s and 1980s and in San Giovenale in 1967 and 1969. He headed the Swedish part of the Greek-Swedish excavations at Midea in Argolis (1983-1999) and conducted excavations in Dendra together with Greek archaeologist Nicoletta Divari-Valakou, Head of the Archaeological Sites Department, Hellenic Ministry of Culture and at Hala Sultan Tekke, site of one of the Late Bronze Age biggest harbours in Cyprus.

Åström formed his own publishing company, Astrom Editions in 1962. He held honorary doctorates from the University of Vienna (1994), the University of Athens (1995) and the University of Ioannina (2001).

== Selected works ==
- The Middle Cypriote Bronze Age (1957)
- Hala Sultan Tekke: 8, Excavations 1971-79 (1983)
- Kairos: Studies in Art History and Literature (1988)
