= Hermione (Argolis) =

Town at the southern extremity of Argolis

Coordinates: 37°23′00″N 23°15′13″E

Location of Hermonie in Modern Greece

Hermione (Ancient Greek: Ἑρμιόνη) or Hermium or Hermion (Ἑρμιών or Ἑρμιῶν) was a town at the southern extremity of Argolis, in the wider use of this term, but an independent city during the Classical period of Greek history, and possessing a territory named Hermionis (Ἑρμιονίς). The sea between the southern coast of Argolis and the island of Hydra was called after it the Hermionitic Gulf (Ancient Greek: Ἑρμιονικὸς κόλπος, romanized: Hermionikos kolpos; Latin: Hermionicus Sinus), which was regarded as distinct from the Argolic and Saronic Gulfs. The ruins of the ancient town lie about the modern village of Ermioni.

According to Greek mythology, Hermione was founded by the Dryopes, who are said to have been driven out of their original abodes on Mount Oeta and its adjacent valleys by Heracles, and to have settled in the Peloponnesus, where their three chief towns were Hermione, Asine, and Eïon. Hermione is mentioned by Homer along with its kindred city Asine in the Catalogue of Ships in the Iliad. Asine and Eïon were conquered at an early period by the Dorians, but Hermione continued to exist as an independent Dryopian state long afterwards. Hermione appears to have been the most important of the Dryopian towns, and to have been in possession at one time of a larger portion of the adjacent coast, as well as of several of the neighboring islands. Strabo, following ancient authorities, places the promontory Scyllaeum in Hermionis, and the Hermionitic Gulf extended along the coast of Troezen as far as this promontory. Hermione is mentioned first among the cities of the Amphictyony, the representatives of which were accustomed to meet in the adjacent island of Calaureia, from which it has been inferred that Hermione had the presidency of the confederacy, and that the island belonged to this city. It is expressly stated that Hydra belonged to the Hermionians, and that they surrendered this island to the Samian pirates, who gave it into the charge of the Troezenians. The Hermionians are mentioned as Dryopes at the time of the Greco-Persian Wars: they sent three ships to the Battle of Salamis, and 300 men to the Battle of Plataea.

Subsequently the Argives took possession of Hermione, and settled there an Argive colony. There is no account of its conquest, and Pausanias supposes that the Argives obtained peaceable possession of the town; but it probably came into their power about the same time that they subdued Mycenae and Tiryns, 464 BCE. Some of the expelled Hermionians took refuge at Halieis, where the Tirynthians had also settled; and it was perhaps at this time that the lower city was deserted. Hermione now became a Doric city; but the inhabitants still retained some of the ancient Dryopian customs. Thus it continued to be the chief seat of the worship of Demeter Chthonia, who appears to have been the principal deity of the Dryopians; and we learn from a remarkable inscription that the Asinaeans, who had settled in Messenia after their expulsion from Argolis, continued to send offerings to Demeter Chthonia at Hermione. Although Hermione had fallen into the hands of the Argives, it did not continue permanently subject to Argos, and it is mentioned subsequently as an independent town and an ally of Sparta. Around 230 BC the city was ruled by a tyrant named Xenon. The capture of the Acrocorinthus and the liberation of Argos by Aratus of Sicyon, however, convinced Xenon to voluntarily step down in 228 BC. He was the last tyrant of the Peloponnese to surrender his power. Hermione then joined the Achaean League and continued to exist long afterwards, as is evidenced by its numerous coins and inscriptions.

Pausanias describes Hermione at considerable length. The old city, which was no longer inhabited in his time (2nd century), stood upon a promontory seven stadia in length, and three in breadth at its widest part; and on either side of this promontory there was a convenient harbour. There were still several temples standing on this promontory in the time of Pausanias, of which the most remarkable was one sacred to Poseidon. The later town, which Pausanias visited, stood at the distance of four stadia from this temple upon the slopes of the hill Pron. It was entirely surrounded by walls, and was in earlier times the acropolis of the city. The ruins lie about the modern village of Ermioni. Of the numerous temples mentioned by Pausanias the most important was the ancient Dryopian sanctuary of Demeter Chthonia, situated on a height of Mount Pron, said to have been founded by Chthonia, daughter of Phoroneus, and Clymenus her brother. It was an inviolable sanctuary; but it was plundered by Cilician pirates. Opposite this temple was one sacred to Clymenus and to the right was the stoa of Echo, which repeated the voice three times. In the same neighbourhood there were three sacred places surrounded with stone fences; one named the sanctuary of Clymenus, the second that of Hades, and the third that of the Acherusian lake. In the sanctuary of Clymenus there was an opening in the earth which the Hermionians believed to be the shortest road to Hades, and consequently they put no money in the mouths of their dead to pay the ferryman of the lower world.

== Archaeological research ==
Greek and Swedish archaeologists have conducted research in Hermione since 2015, first in a project entitled A Greek cityscape and its people. A study of Ancient Hermione (2015-2017), which has been continued in a research program called Hermione: A model city (2018-). The projects aim to create a better understanding of life in a Greek polis from a long-term perspective through integrated studies of the built environment, landscape, family and other social structures as well as religious practices, including funerary rituals. The first results have been published in the journal of the Swedish Institute at Athens, called Opuscula, and in the journal Archaeological Prospection.

== See also ==
- Swedish Institute at Athens

== Sources ==
- Swedish Institute at Athens - Hermione (2015): https://www.sia.gr/en/articles.php?tid=17&page=1
- Swedish Institute at Athens - Ancient Hermion (2015): https://www.sia.gr/en/articles.php?tid=34&page=1
- Swedish Institute at Athens - Hermione, The Argolid (2015- ongoing) (2021): https://www.sia.gr/en/articles.php?tid=447&page=1
