= Calaurus =

Greek mythological island

In Greek mythology, Calaurus (Ancient Greek: Καλαύρου) was the eponym of the island of Kalaureia near Troezen. He was the son of Poseidon.
