= Dendra =

Prehistoric archaeological site in Greece

- Δενδρά (Greek)
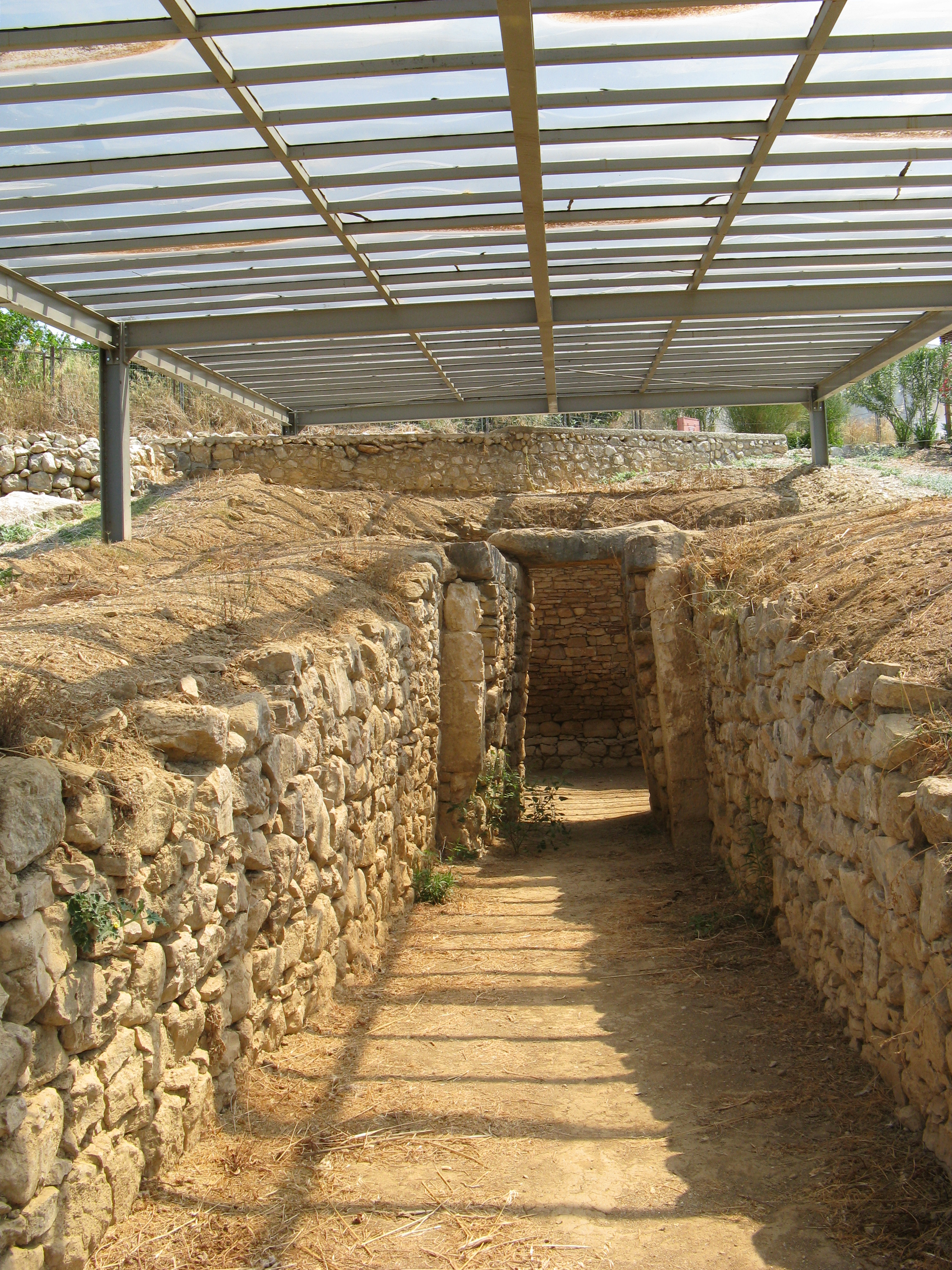
- The tholos tomb at Dendra

- Location within Greece
- 37°39′21″N 22°49′43″E
- Type: Settlement
- Periods: Early Bronze Age to Mycenaean
- Location: Dendra, Argolis, Greece

Site notes
- Archaeologists: Axel W. Persson
- Owner: Public
- Management: Ephorate of Antiquities of Argolis
- Public access: Yes
- Website: Hellenic Ministry of Culture and Tourism

Dendra (Greek: Δενδρά) is a prehistoric archaeological site situated outside the village with the same name belonging to the municipality of Midea in the Argolid, Greece.

The site was inhabited during the Neolithic and Early Helladic periods, and is known for its Late Bronze Age cemetery. In the first half of the 20th century, the Swedish archaeologist Axel W. Persson excavated an unplundered tholos tomb and many Mycenaean chamber tombs, presumably belonging to the ruling classes of the nearby citadel of Midea. The finds from the site include the Dendra panoply, a set of Mycenaean bronze armour found in one of its chamber tombs, and the Dendra Octopus Cup from the tholos. From the Hellenistic into the Byzantine periods, it was the site of a village: local tradition recalled that it had once been known as "Sanga".

== History ==
The site of Dendra is approximately 6 kilometres (3.7 mi) from the town of Argos. It was inhabited during the Neolithic and Early Helladic periods, and used as a cemetery between the Late Helladic II period and Late Helladic IIIB (that is, c. 1450 – c. 1180 BCE). (Note: Hope Simpson 1965, p. 14. For the chronological dates, see Shelmerdine 2008, p. 4.) The Swedish archaeologist Axel W. Persson, who excavated both sites, considered the cemetery to have been used by the elites of the nearby citadel of Midea; this view remains generally upheld by modern archaeologists, though Schallin suggests that people from other sites may have also used the cemetery.

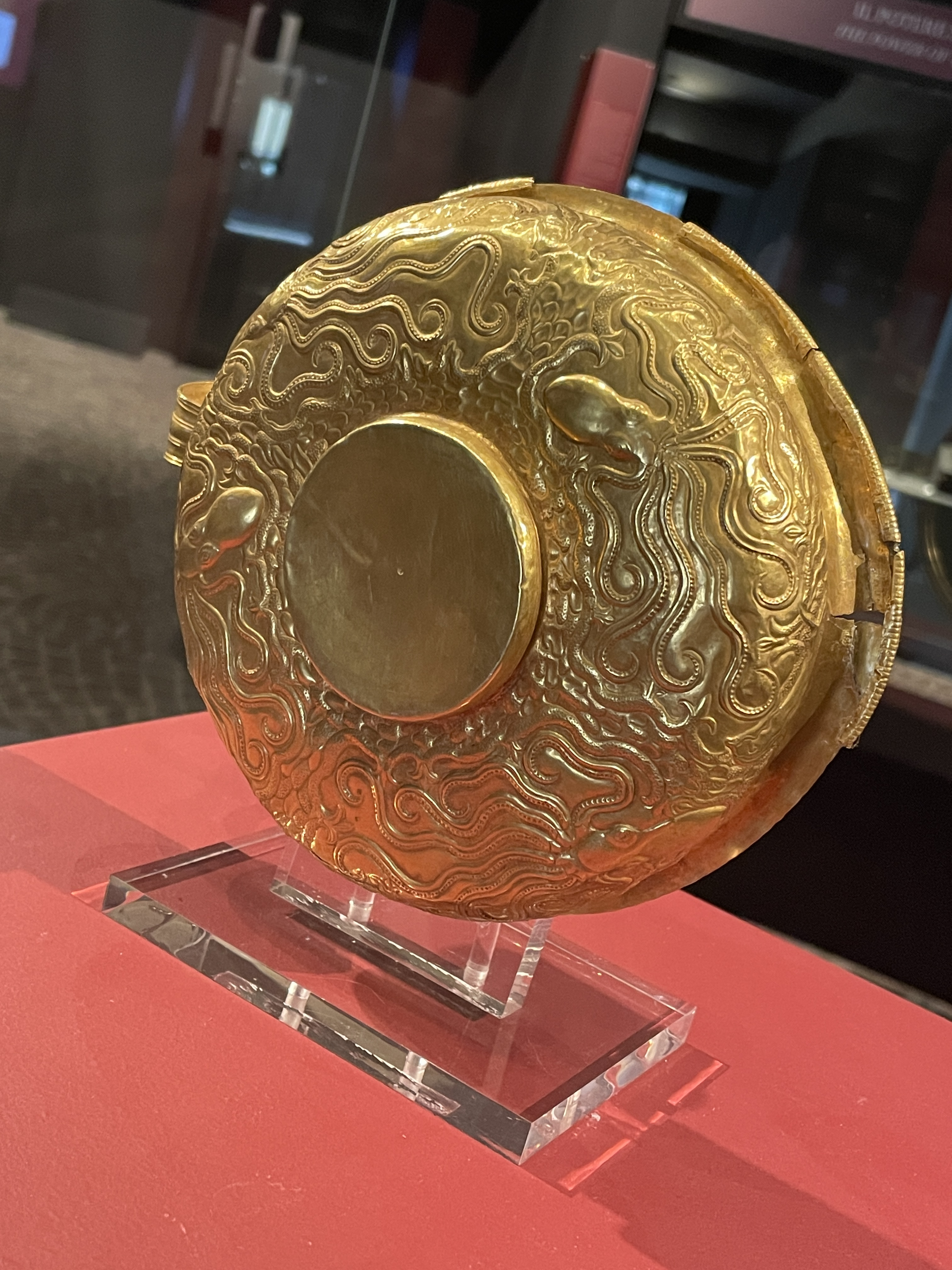
The golden Octopus Cup from Dendra

The cemetery consists of a tholos tomb, three tumuli and sixteen chamber tombs, and is one of the richest known from the Mycenaean period. Persson named the tholos tomb the "Royal Tomb", and determined that it dated to the Late Helladic IIIA period (c. 1350 BCE). Although the chamber itself was empty, several burials in it were made in pits in the floor. They included a female skeleton, dubbed "a little princess" by Persson, a second female skeleton which he called "the queen", and a male skeleton he called "the king", as well as further bones belonging to at least three additional people, and a further burial in the tomb's stomion dating to the Protogeometric period. The tomb also contained a gold cup, known as the "Dendra Octopus Cup", buried with the "king".

Several of the chamber tombs contained the bones of donkeys, which Peter Mitchell suggests may have had supernatural significance or recalled the horses often buried with high-status individuals at Dendra and other sites. Chamber Tomb 12 contained the Dendra panoply, a set of bronze armour (the oldest such armour from Europe), as well as a boar's tusk helmet. Chamber Tomb 1 included the burials of five individuals including several ceramic phi figurines, one of the kourotrophos type. The chamber of Chamber Tomb 2 was found empty; Persson concluded that it was a cenotaph intended for a warrior killed on a raid into Egypt, though Schallin suggests that it was more probably looted, and calls Persson's explanation "fanciful". A woman's burial was found in the dromos, alongside grave goods consisting of spindle whorls, a needle, and various glass paste objects once coated in gold leaf.

A settlement at the site existed from the Hellenistic into the Byzantine periods: in the twentieth century, a local tradition recorded that a village there had once been called "Sanga".

== Excavation ==
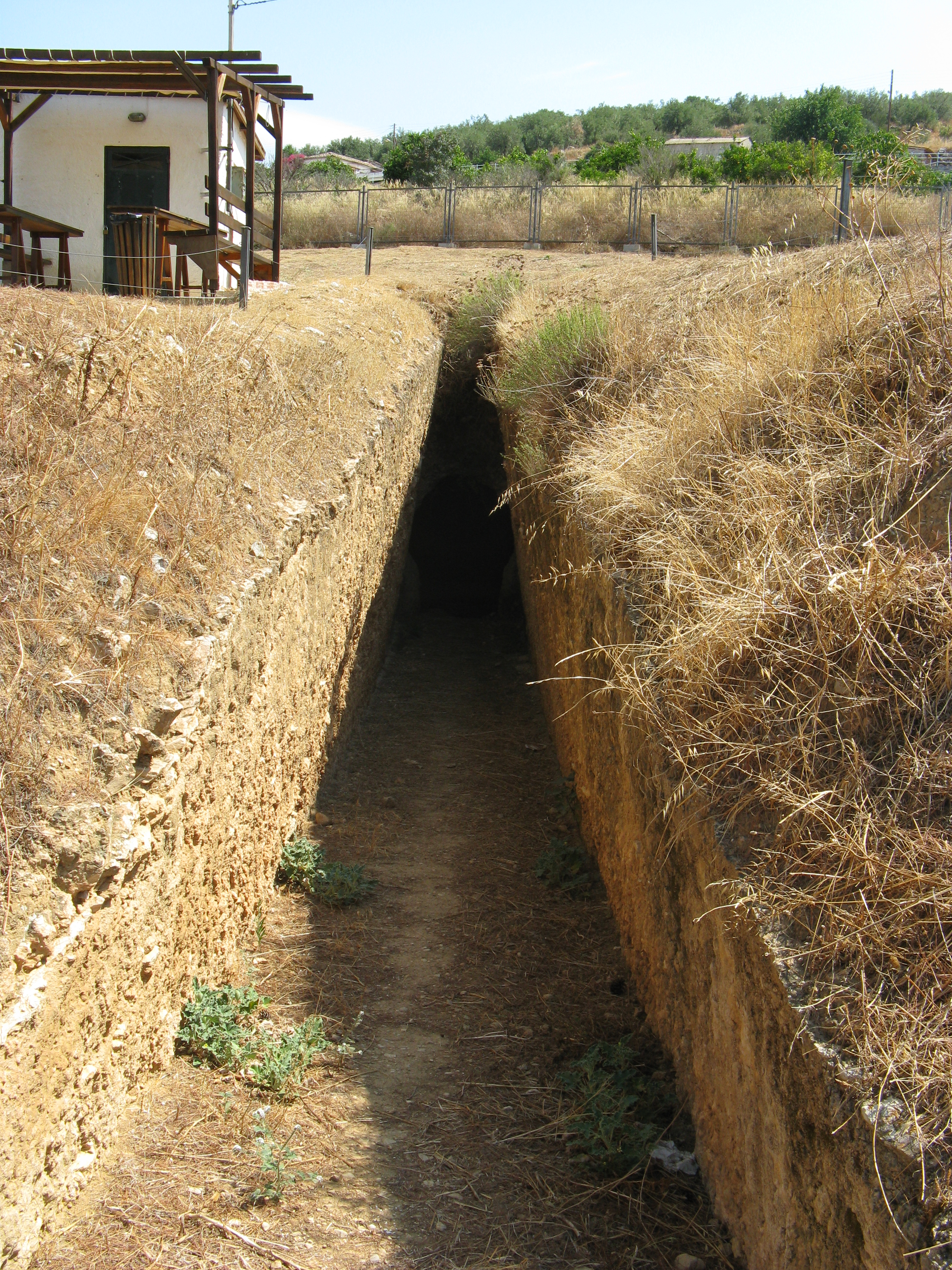
One of the chamber tombs of the Dendra necropolis

The cemetery at Dendra was first excavated in 1926, when Nikolaos Bertos, the local ephor of the Greek Archaeological Service, invited Persson to excavate its tholos tomb. Although looters had attempted to rob the tomb since at least the 11th century BCE, the fact that its burials were made in pits in the floor had saved the tomb from successful looting.

In 1927, Persson excavated three chamber tombs at the site, and Bertos excavated a further two. While excavating at Midea in 1937, Persson made further excavations at Dendra to investigate what was called the "Dendra Mystery": the alleged discovery and disappearance, in the nearby village, of a large golden vessel. Although he determined that the cup never existed, he excavated a further chamber tomb, and returned in 1939 to excavate an additional four. Persson's excavations were frequently visited by villagers from modern Dendra and by tourists from other areas of Greece: an innkeeper from Mykines, near the Bronze Age citadel of Mycenae, walked three hours to the site, and drank wine from the Octopus Cup at the archaeologists' invitation.

Subsequent excavations (following partly successful attempts to plunder the unexcavated tombs) unearthed in 1960 the Dendra panoply of bronze armour, currently exhibited at the Archaeological Museum in nearby Nafplio, and Bronze Age tumulus burials which included sacrificed horses.

== Bibliography ==
- Casson, Stanley (1932). "Review: The Royal Tombs at Dendra near Midea". Antiquity. 6 (23): 467–468. doi:10.1017/S0003598X00007110.
- Hope Simpson, Richard (1965). A Gazetteer of Mycenaean Sites. Institute of Classical Studies Bulletin Supplements. Vol. 16. University of London.
- Hurwit, Jeffrey (1979). "The Dendra Octopus Cup and the Problem of Style in the Fifteenth Century Aegean". American Journal of Archaeology. 83 (4): 413–426. JSTOR 504141.
- Mitchell, Peter (2018). The Donkey in Human History: An Archaeological Perspective. Oxford University Press. ISBN 978-0-19-874923-3.
- Molloy, Barry (2008). "Martial Arts and Materiality: A Combat Archaeology Perspective on Aegean Swords of the Fifteenth and Fourteenth Centuries BC". World Archaeology. 40 (1): 116–134. JSTOR 40025316.
- Persson, Axel W. (1931). The Royal Tombs at Dendra near Midea. London: Humphrey Mitford – via Internet Archive.
- Persson, Axel W. (1942). New Tombs at Dendra near Midea. Oxford University Press.
- Sakka, Niki (2021). "Archaeology and Politics in the Interwar Period: The Swedish Excavations at Asine". In Solomon, Esther (ed.). Contested Antiquity: Archaeological Heritage and Social Conflict in Modern Greece and Cyprus. Bloomington: University of Indiana Press. pp. 80–107. ISBN 978-0-253-05596-5.
- Schallin, Ann-Louise (2016). "Rituals and Ceremonies at the Mycenaean Cemetery at Dendra". In Murphy, Joanne (ed.). Ritual and Archaic States. Gainesville: University Press of Florida. pp. 76–99. doi:10.5744/florida/9780813062785.001.0001. ISBN 978-0-8130-6278-5.
- Schofield, Louise; Parkinson, R. B. (1994). "Of Helmets and Heretics: A Possible Egyptian Representation of Mycenaean Warriors on a Papyrus from El-Amarna". The Annual of the British School at Athens. 89: 157–170. JSTOR 30102567.
- Shapland, Andrew (2025). The Emergence of Aegean Prehistory. Cambridge Elements. Cambridge University Press. ISBN 978-1-009-34284-1.
- Shelmerdine, Cynthia (2008). "Introduction: Background, Methods and Sources". In Shelmerdine, Cynthia (ed.). The Cambridge Companion to the Aegean Bronze Age. Cambridge: Cambridge University Press. pp. 1–18.

== See also ==
- Swedish Institute at Athens
