= Xenon (tyrant) =

Last tyrant of the ancient Greek city of Hermione

Xenon (Ancient Greek: Ξενων) was the last tyrant of the ancient Greek city of Hermione. In 229 BC he was convinced by Aratus of Sicyon to step down from his post and let his city join the Achaean League.

Around the same time the poet Cercidas of Megalopolis wrote a poem about a "greedy cormorant wealthpurse, that sweet-scented out-of-control Xenon", but it is impossible to establish if he intended the same person.
