= Midea (Argolid) =

Ancient Greek city

Coordinates: 37°38′59″N 22°50′29″E

Midea (Greece)

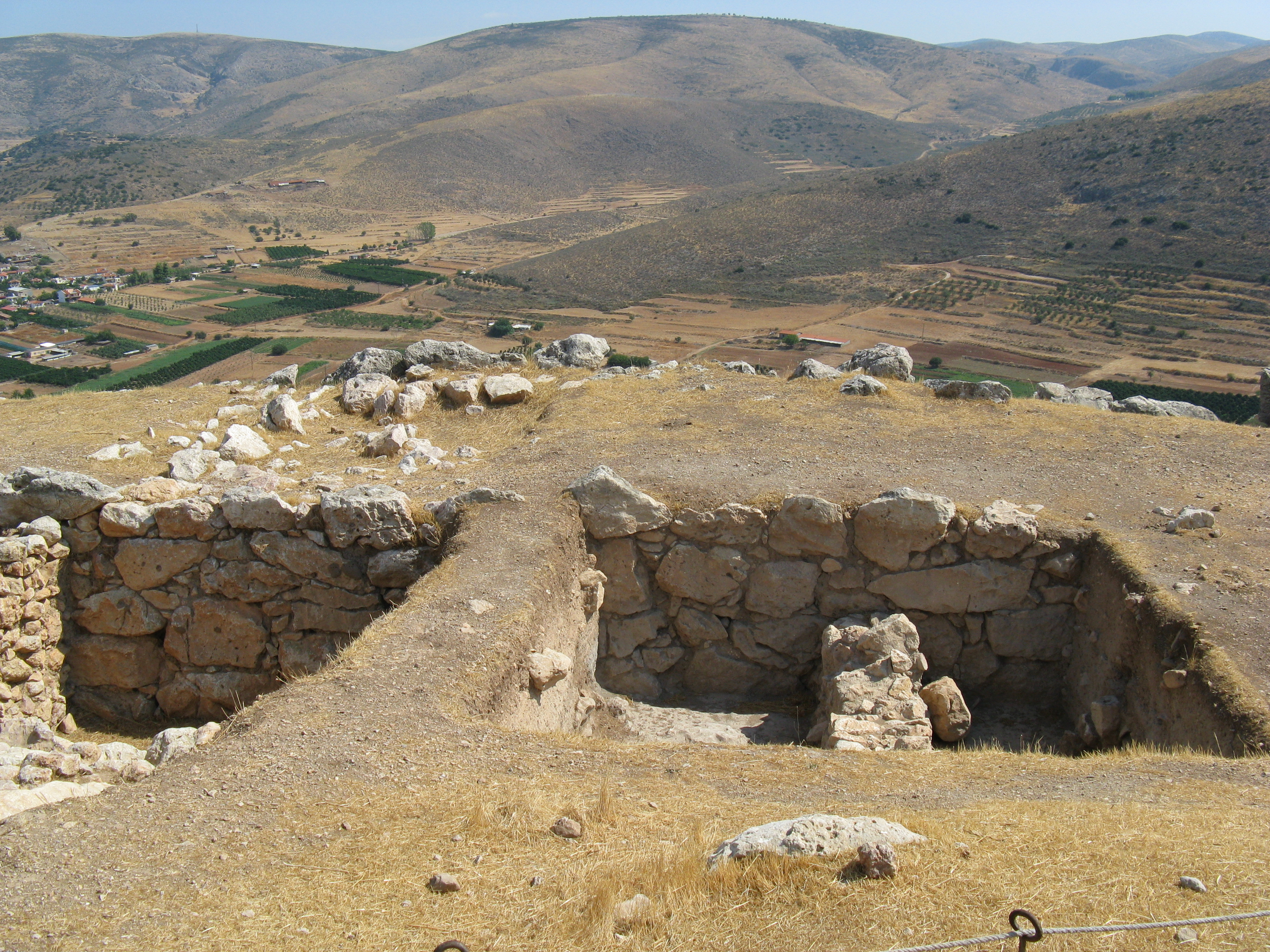
Midea archeological site.

Midea (Ancient Greek: Μιδέα) or Mideia (Μίδεια) was a city of ancient Argolis.

== Mythology and proto-history ==
Midea was originally called Perseuspolis (Περσέως πόλις), and is mentioned by Pseudo-Apollodorus in connection with its eponymous hero Perseus. It was said to have derived its name from the wife of Electryon, and was celebrated as the residence of Electryon and the birthplace of his daughter Alcmena, best known as the mother of Heracles. But it is mentioned in the earliest division of the country, along with the Heraeum and Tiryns, as belonging to Proetus. It was the residence of Hippodameia in her banishment.

== History ==
It was destroyed by Argos, probably at the same time as Tiryns, soon after the Greco-Persian Wars. Strabo describes Midea as near Tiryns; and from its mention by Pausanias, in connection with the Heraeum and Tiryns, it must be placed on the eastern edge of the Argeian plain. The only clue in the ancient authors to its exact position is a statement by Pausanias, who says that, returning from Tiryns into the road leading from Argos to Epidaurus, "you will reach Mideia on the left."

== Site and remains ==
The remains of Midea, that of a Bronze Age citadel, stand above the village of the same name in the Argolid. The citadel is one of the largest and best preserved Mycenaean citadels. A tholos tomb and cemetery of chamber tombs at nearby Dendra is associated with the site.

Excavations were started by the Swedish archaeologist Axel W. Persson and have been continued regularly by the Swedish Institute at Athens and published in the journal Opuscula.

=== Palace ===
The first Megaron was constructed in the LH IIIB2 period and destroyed c.1200 BC like the rest of the settlement. A smaller version was later resurrected during the LH IIIC period.

== See also ==
- Swedish Institute at Athens
- Helladic chronology
- Argos, Lerna, Tiryns, Mycenae - similar nearby sites

== Sources ==
- Swedish Institute at Athens - Midea, Argolid: https://www.sia.gr/en/articles.php?tid=339&page=1
