= Kalaureia =

Island in Greece

Native name: Καλαυρία
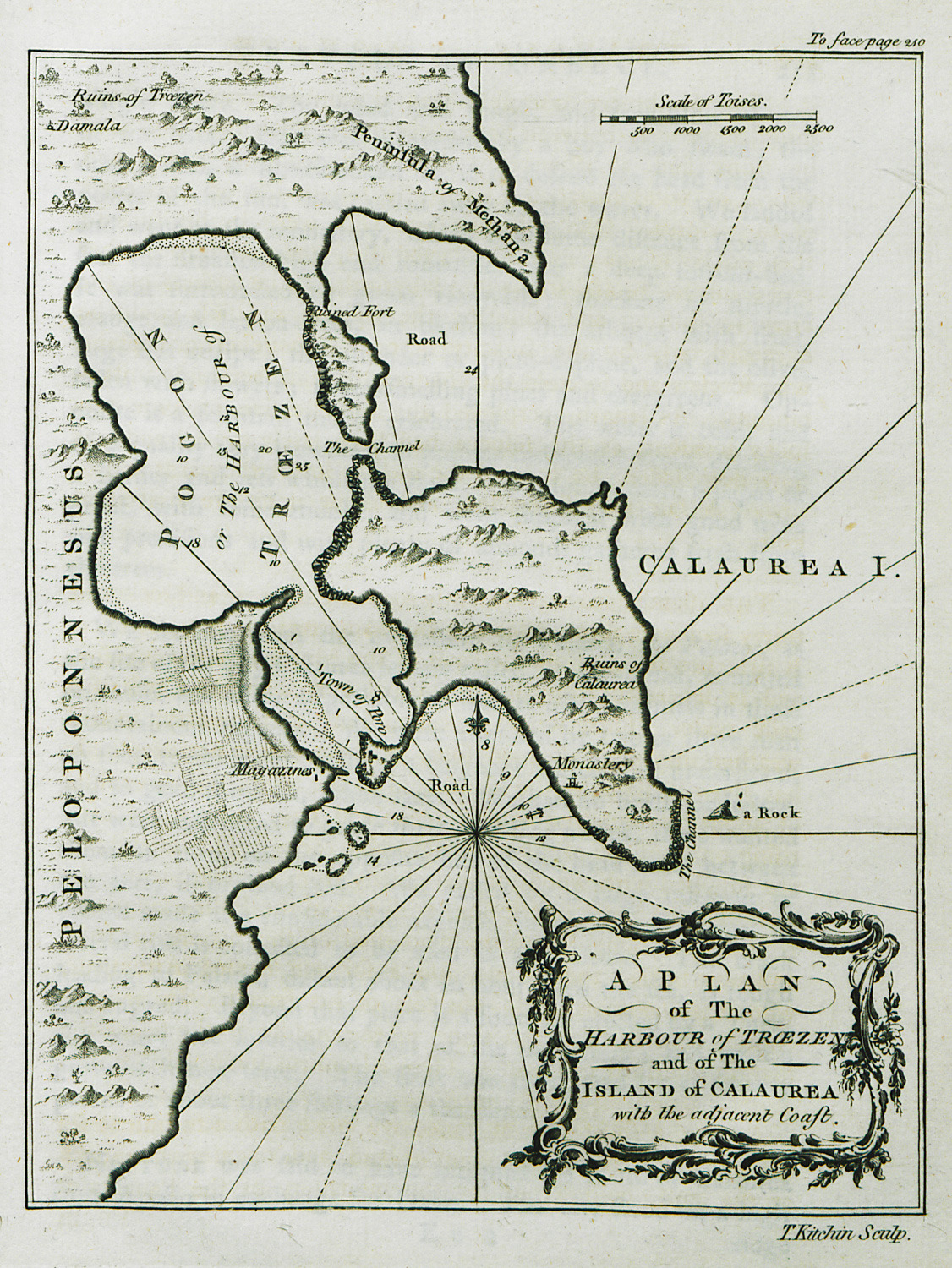
- The Harbour of Troezen and the Island of Calaurea with the adjacent coast, map of 1776
- Interactive map of Kalaureia

Geography
- Coordinates: 37°31′07″N 23°28′45″E
- Archipelago: Aegean

Administration
- Greece

Kalaureia (Ancient Greek: Καλαυρεία) or Calauria or Kalavria (Greek: Καλαυρία) is an island close to the coast of Troezen in the Peloponnesus of mainland Greece, part of the modern island-pair Poros.

Strabo describes the coastwise journey along the Hermionic Gulf:

The gulf begins at the town of Asine. Then come Hermione and Troezen; and, as one sails along the coast, one comes also to the island of Calauria, which has a circuit of one hundred and thirty stadia and is separated from the mainland by a strait four stadia wide.

== Pre-classical asylum ==
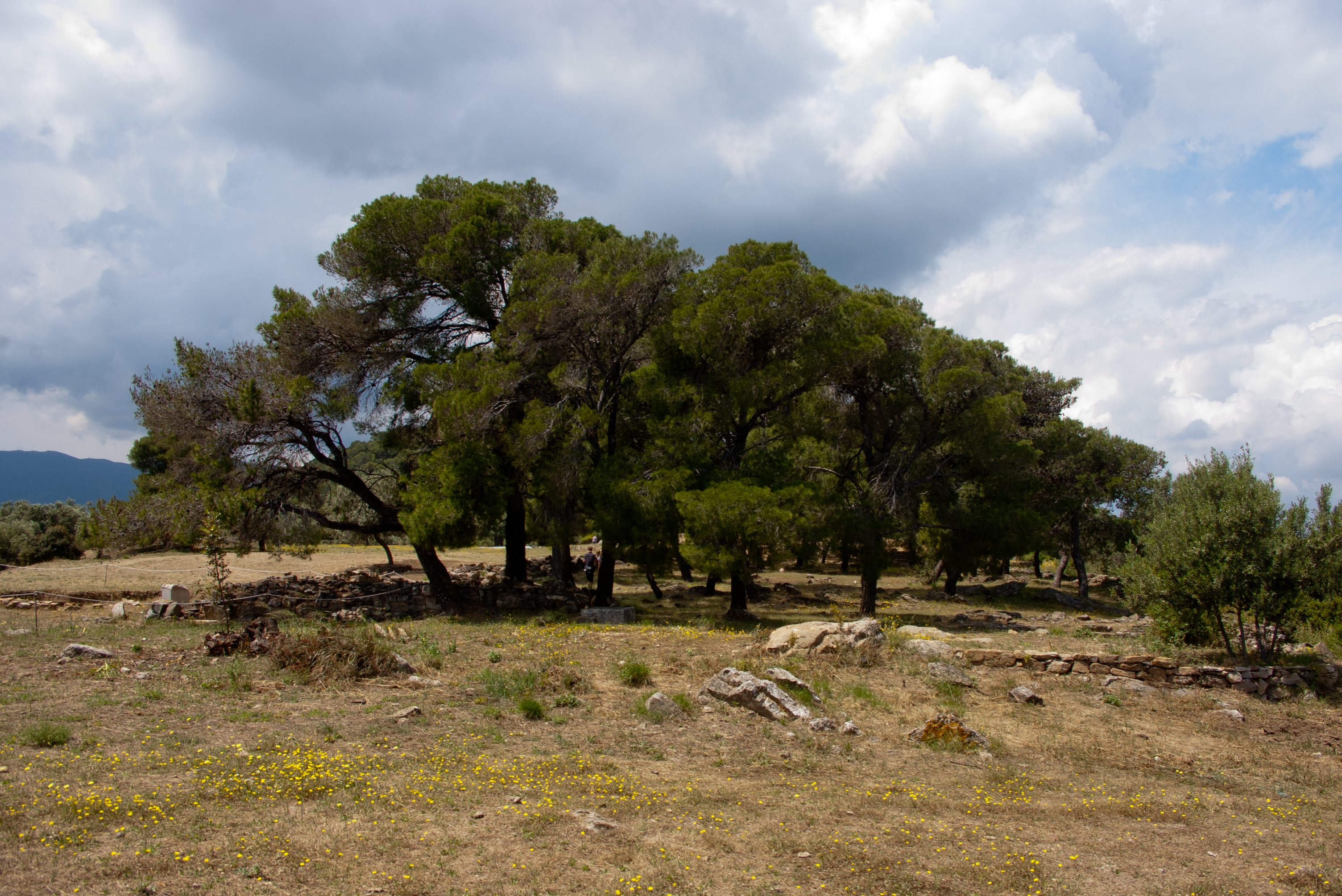
The site of the temple of Poseidon.

On Calauria a Doric temple of Poseidon was built in the ancient sanctuary, possibly around 520 BCE. The dimensions of the temple are 27.4 by 14.4 m. There are six columns on each short side and twelve on each long side.

There is strong evidence that the epithet of Poseidon at Kalaureia was Geraistos (Γεραιστός), a word from an unknown pre-Hellenic language. A 6th century A.D. dictionary by Stephanus of Byzantium gives the names of Zeus's sons as Geraistos, Tainaros, and Kalauros, who sailed from an unspecified location and landed in different places on the Peloponnesus. Geraistos, Tainaros, and Kalaureia are all sanctuaries of Poseidon; in the towns of the latter two, one of the months of the year was named Geraistios (the only other poleis (πόλεις) with this month name are Sparta, Kalymna, and Kos). It is also theorized that the epithet Geraistios (Γεραίστιος) also applies to Kalaureia because all three sanctuaries function as asylums.

Another, older aetiology of the temple says that it was bartered for by Poseidon himself, who received it from Apollo in exchange for his share of Delphi. This story is attested by Callimachus, Pausanias referencing Musaeus, and Strabo referencing the history of Ephorus. Pausanias and Strabo both quote the following oracle: "For thee it is the same thing to possess Delos or Kalaureia / most holy Pytho [Delphi] or windy Taenarum."

Kalaureia (Greece)

Kalaureia was mentioned by Philostephanus in a lost work On Islands.

It was to Kalaureia that Demosthenes the famous orator, condemned to death with his friends by the pro-Philip Macedonian party at Athens, fled and took sanctuary in Poseidon's sanctuary; as Antipater's officers closed in, he took poison and died, 16 October 322 BCE.

== Legendary amphictyony ==
It is claimed by the Hellenistic historian Strabo that in the Archaic period, an early amphictyony, one of several Hellenic leagues of pre-classical times of which little is known, was centered on Kalaureia–the Calaurian Amphictyony. Archaeology of the site suggested to Thomas Kelly that the sacred league was founded in the second quarter of the seventh century BCE, ca 680-650; before that date there were virtually no remains at the site, which could not have been used more than sporadically. A peribolos (περίβολος) wall enclosing the sanctuary site was built with the temple, but there are no earlier traces of structures. The temenos or sanctuary dedicated to Poseidon, may have been linked to the sanctuaries at Geraistos and Tainaros (Ταίναρος). The island was known at one time as Eirene (Εἰρήνη) ("Peace"), clearly in reference to the amphictyony. A reference in Strabo gives a list of the poleis that belonged:

And there was also a kind of Amphictyonic League connected with this temple, a league of seven cities which shared in the sacrifice; they were Hermione, Epidaurus, Aegina, Athens, Prasïeis, Nauplïeis, and Orchomenus of Arcadia; however, the Argives paid dues for the Nauplians, and the Lacedaemonians for the Prasians. (Strabo, Geography viii.6.14.)

Troezen and Poros, which he considered the harbour of Troezen, Strabo omitted. However, there is no archaeological evidence to corroborate this list, and modern scholars believe that a feast in the ancient temenos celebrating the "revival" of the amphictyony, may have been based on a Hellenistic invention; the feast certainly existed: a third-century BCE plaque celebrating the "revival" of the Kalaureian League has been recovered.

After the Greco-Persian Wars, the friendly connection between Athens and Troezen appears to have continued; and during the hegemony of the Athenian empire before the Thirty Years' Peace (455 BCE) Troezen was an ally of Athens, and was apparently garrisoned by Athenian troops; but by this peace the Athenians were compelled to relinquish Troezen. (19.29)

== Archaeological excavations ==
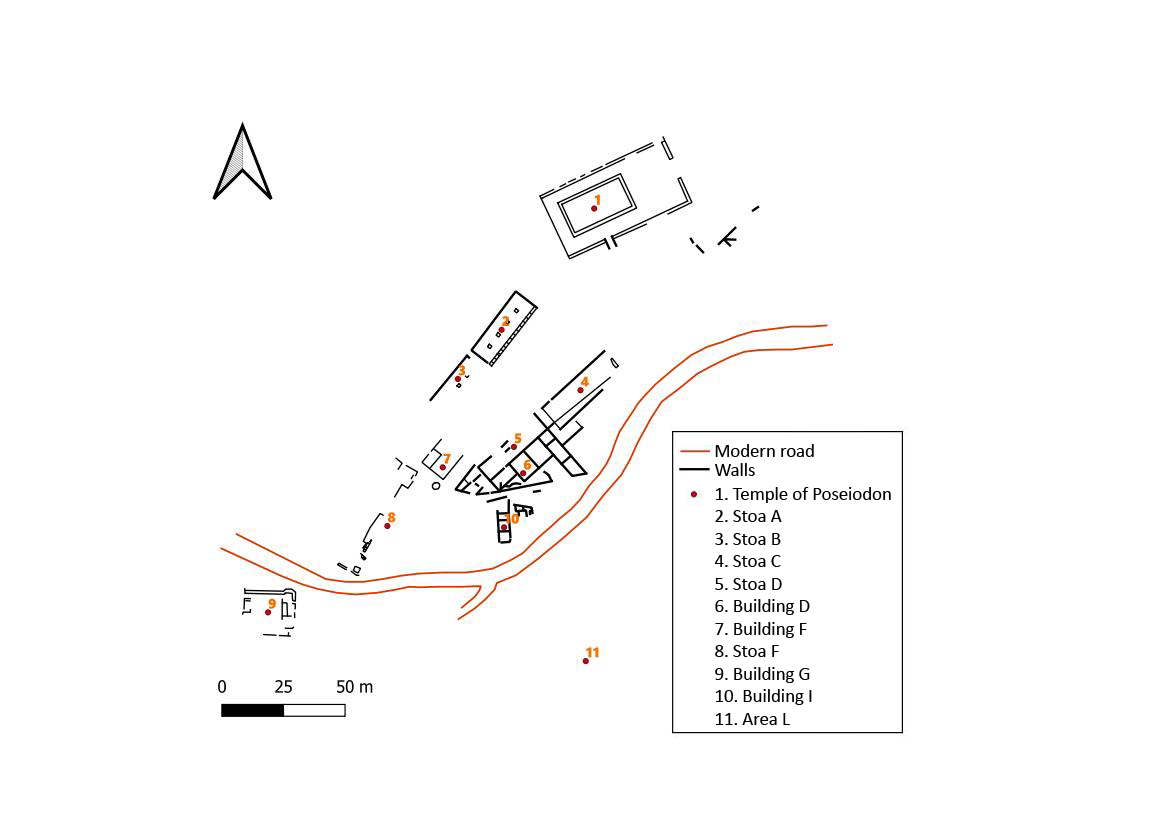
Archaeological excavations at Kalaureia

The Sanctuary was excavated by Swedish archaeologists in 1894. These early excavations are treated in Ingrid Berg's PhD thesis (Stockholm University), published in 2016. Excavations were resumed in 1997, conducted by the Swedish Institute in Athens in collaboration with the Greek National Heritage Board. The results of these new excavations are published in the Institute's journal Opuscula Atheniensia (-2007) and (with open access) in Opuscula (2008-). The excavations are also presented at the Institute's webpage. In 2007-2012 the extensive research program "The City, the God, and the Sea" was financed by Riksbankens Jubileumsfond, and a final report of the results, written in Swedish, is available with open access at rj.se.

=== Archaeological finds during modern excavations ===
During the Late Archaic period a number of buildings were erected, including the temple, Stoa D and the Propylon (Building E). Little is known about the temple constructed during this period as it was almost completely robbed out by the time of the early Swedish excavations and when modern work started only foundation trenches and roof tiles remained. The temple was a peripteral building with 6×12 columns, constructed mainly out of poros stone and was surrounded by a low wall with the main entrance on the east side and a smaller entrance in the south. Stoa D, a simple colonnaded hall, was constructed during the same period and is currently poorly preserved. Building E, usually interpreted as the sanctuary’s propylon, is somewhat better preserved. It has two identifiable rooms in addition to the entrance way, the rooms may have functioned as a bouleuterion or the seat of the amphictyony.

Building activity continued also during the Classical period. Stoa A and Stoa B were constructed along the north side of the sanctuary. Only the foundation of the back wall of Stoa B is preserved. More is known of Stoa A which originally was a Doric building with polygonal walls covered in red plaster and with an inner Ionic colonnade. The building was destroyed already in antiquity, probably around 100 BC. Later, in Roman times, it housed several small sheds with commercial activity, suggesting that the area had an economic function at this time.

The next major phase of building activity also took place during the late 4th century BC. Structures were erected both inside and outside of the sanctuary. Stoa D was expanded by the large trapezoidal building D to the south. Building D was composed of three rectangular rooms that opened into the Stoa. Stoa C (the fourth and final stoa) was erected at the same time to the north-east of Building D. Facing the inner open area of the sanctuary it had an outer Doric and inner Ionic colonnade. An inscription suggests that the building functioned as an archive or was used for other administrative purposes.

Several buildings have also been revealed outside of the sanctuary itself. Building E was interpreted as a bouleuterion due to the many statue bases found in front of it. The large Stoa F was located just to the west of Building E. On the other side of the modern road a rectangular structure (Building G) was located. This was formed by a courtyard which was entered from the east and surrounded by several rooms. Among the finds was a statuette of Asklepios. There is also evidence for private architecture. Immediately to the south of Building D lies the Building I; a large structure which remained in use from the Late Classical period to Roman times. The proximity to the sanctuary suggests that the temenos of Poseidon was surrounded by the city at this time and not isolated from the urban landscape.

The most recent work on the site have focused on Area L to the south of the sanctuary and Building I, across the modern road. The identification of several large pithoi suggests that the building filled a communal function.

== See also ==
- Swedish Institute at Athens

== Sources ==
- Swedish Institute at Athens - Kalaureia (2015): https://www.sia.gr/en/articles.php?tid=16&page=1
- Swedish Institute at Athens - The 2016 excavation campaign in Ancient Kalaureia: https://www.sia.gr/en/articles.php?tid=80&page=1
- Swedish Institute at Athens - Kalaureia, Poros (1894 and 1997– ongoing) (2020): https://www.sia.gr/en/articles.php?tid=329&page=1
- Swedish Institute at Athens - The Kalaureia Excavation Project 2021 (2021): https://www.sia.gr/en/articles.php?tid=546&page=1
