= Åke Åkerström =

Swedish archaeologist and classical scholar (1902–1991)

Åke Åkerström (26 April 1902 – October 1991) was a Swedish archaeologist and classical scholar. He is best known for his work on architectural terracottas and Ancient vase painting.

== Biography ==
Åkerström received his doctoral degree at Uppsala University in 1934 where he was a student of Axel W. Persson. His dissertation was titled Studien über die etruskischen Gräber, unter besonderer Berücksichtigung der Entwicklung des Kammergrabes and dealt with Etruscan chamber tombs. He was the director of the Swedish Institute at Athens during two periods, 1948-1956 and 1970–1972.

== Bibliography ==
- 1934 Studien über die etruskischen Gräber, unter besonderer Berücksichtigung der Entwicklung des Kammergrabes
- 1940 Larisa am Hermos: die Ergebnisse der Ausgrabungen 1902-1934. 2, Die architektonischen Terrakotten
- 1943 Der geometrische Stil in Italien
- 1951 Architektonische Terrakottaplatten in Stockholm
- 1966 Die Architektonischen Terrakotten Kleinasiens
- 1987 Berbati vol. 2, The Pictorial Pottery
