= Midea, Greece =

Midea Μιδέα
- Municipal unit
- Location within the regional unit

- Location within Greece
- Coordinates: 37°39′N 22°49′E
- Country: Greece
- Administrative region: Peloponnese
- Regional unit: Argolis
- Municipality: Nafplio

Area
  - Municipal unit: 178.3 km^{2} (68.8 sq mi)

Population (2021)
  - Municipal unit: 4,966
  - Municipal unit density: 27.85/km^{2} (72.14/sq mi)
  - Community: 510
- Time zone: UTC+2 (EET)
  - Summer (DST): UTC+3 (EEST)
- Postal code: 210 55
- Vehicle registration: AP

Midea (Greek: Μιδέα) is a village and a former municipality in Argolis, Peloponnese, Greece. It was named Gerbesi (Γκέρμπεσι) until 1928. Since the 2011 local government reform it is part of the municipality Nafplio, of which it is a municipal unit. The municipal unit has an area of 178.306 km^{2}, and a population of 4,966 (2021). The seat of the municipality was in Agia Triada.

Within the boundaries of the municipal unit are two significant archaeological sites dating to the Bronze Age or earlier. One is the site of Dendra located outside the village of the same name. The other is the citadel site of Midea. Both sites were originally excavated by the archaeologist Axel W. Persson between the 1920s and World War II.

The villagers call themselves Arvanites, and traditionally speak Arvanitika.
