= Philostephanus =

3rd century BC North African Hellenistic writer

Philostephanus of Cyrene (Philostephanus Cyrenaeus) (Ancient Greek: Φιλοστέφανος) was a Hellenistic writer from North Africa, who was a pupil of the poet Callimachus in Alexandria and doubtless worked there during the 3rd century BC.

His history of Cyprus, De Cypro, written during the reign of Ptolemy Philopator (222–206 BC), has been lost, but it was known to at least two Christian writers, Clement of Alexandria and Arnobius. It contained a narration of the story of the mythical Pygmalion, of Cyprus, who fashioned a cult image of the Greek goddess Aphrodite that came to life. Ovid depended on the account by Philostephanus for his dramatised and expanded version in Metamorphoses, through which the Pygmalion myth was transmitted to the medieval and modern world.

The remarks on Cyprus seem to have come from a larger work, On Islands. Scattered brief quotes of Philostephanus on islands refer also to Sicily, Calauria off the coast of Troezen and Stryme, off the Thracian coast. Pliny's Natural History adduces Philostephanus as a source for the assertion that Jason was the first who went out to sea in a long vessel.

Other works of Philostephanus cited in surviving passages from other authors were works Of the Cities of Asia, On Cyllene, Epirotica ("On Epirus"), On Marvellous Rivers On Inventions, and various commentaries.

The fragments of Philostephanus, surviving in quotes from other authors, were published in Karl Wilhelm Ludwig Müller et al., Fragmenta Historicorum Graecorum.
