= Carl-Gustaf Styrenius =

Swedish classical archaeologist (1929–2023)

Carl-Gustaf Yngve Styrenius (17 June 1929 – 12 January 2023) was a Swedish classical archaeologist.

== Biography ==
Carl-Gustaf Styrenius was born in Helsingborg on 17 June 1929. He studied at Lund University, receiving a MPhil degree in 1954 and a Lic. degree in philosophy in 1961. He was a teaching assistant at the Classical Department from 1950 to 1954 and at the university's Antiquities Museum in 1956–1959. In 1967, he received his PhD degree after defending his thesis on Sub-Mycenaean pottery. He was appointed docent in classical antiquities and ancient history in Lund the same year. In 1963, he was appointed acting director of the Swedish Institute at Athens. He was director of the Institute from 1967 to 1970, as well as cultural attaché at the Swedish Embassy in Athens from 1963 to 1970. He participated in archaeological excavations at Tell Sukas in Syria in 1961, in Asine in 1970–1974 and in Chania from 1969 to 1990 (both in Greece) and in Carthage in Tunisia in from 1979 to 1983.

Styrenius became acting professor at Lund University in 1971. The same year, he was appointed Director of the Museum of Mediterranean and Near Eastern Antiquities in Stockholm, a position he held until 1989.

Styrenius was given the title of professor in 1994. He was chairman of the Swedish-Tunisian Association in 1972–1975, became secretary of the board of the Swedish Institute at Athens in 1986, was secretary of the Friends of the Museum of Mediterranean and Near Eastern Antiquities in 1971–1989 (and then was a board member until 1999), board member of the Swedish Archaeological Society in 1978–1982, board member of the Swedish-Greek Society 1984–1997 and board member of the Friends of the Swedish Istanbul Institute from 1989, where he also became secretary in 1994. In 1983 he became a corresponding member of the German Archaeological Institute.

Styrenius died in Solna on 12 January 2023, at the age of 93.
