= Swedish Institute at Athens =

Swedish archaeological institute in Athens, Greece

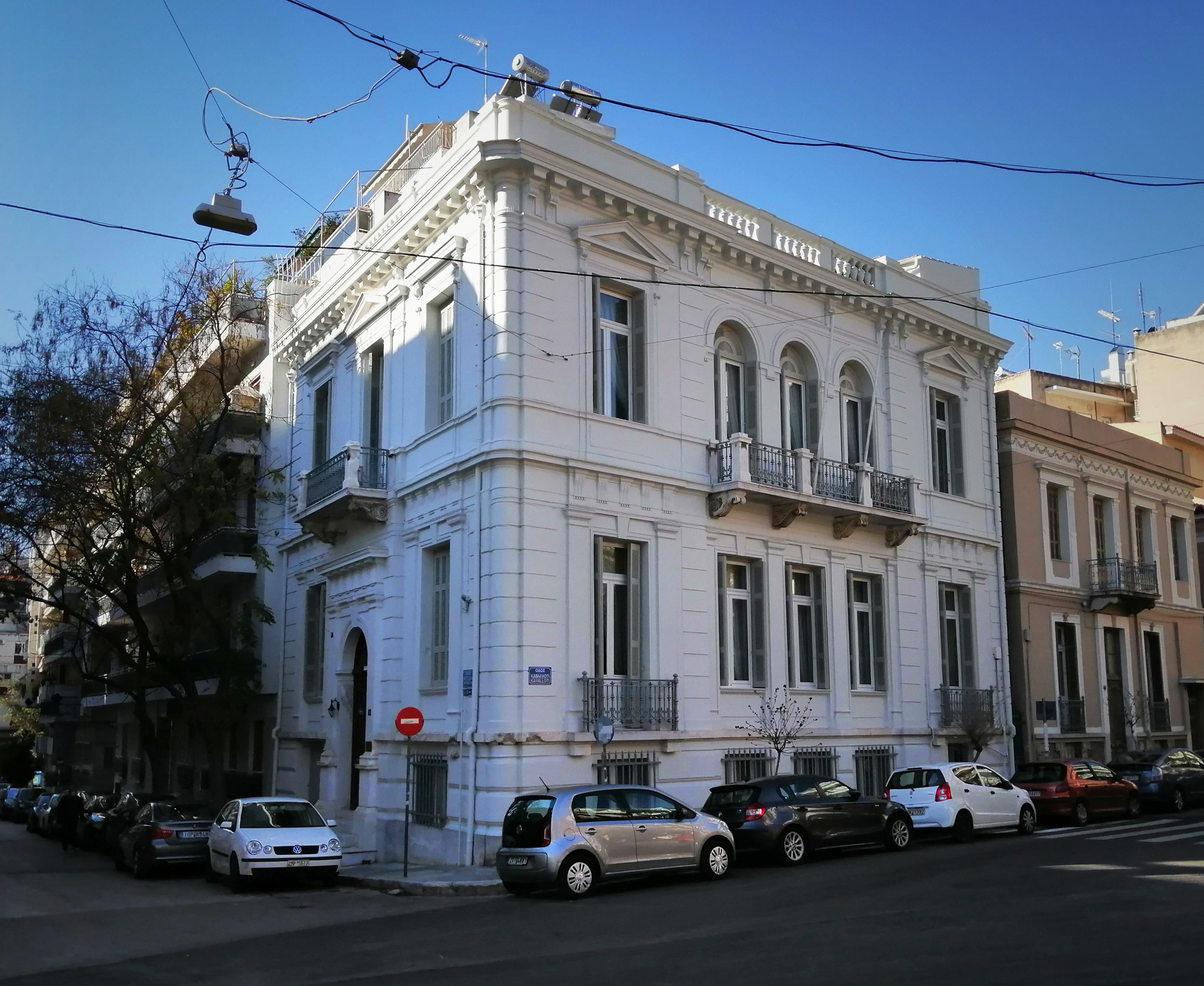
The Swedish Institute at Athens

The Swedish Institute at Athens (Swedish: Svenska institutet I Athen; Greek: Σουηδικό Ινστιτούτο Αθηνών) was founded in 1946 and is one of 19 foreign archaeological institutes operating in Athens, Greece. The institute is one of three Swedish research institutes in the Mediterranean, along with the Swedish Institute of Classical Studies in Rome and the Swedish Research Institute in Istanbul. Besides the premises in Athens the institute has an office in Stockholm and a guesthouse in Kavala. It also owns the Nordic Library along with the Danish Institute at Athens, the Finnish Institute at Athens and the Norwegian Institute at Athens.

The institute is a non-profit research foundation. The board consists of a chairman appointed by the Swedish Government, a vice-chair, secretary, treasurer, and additional members representing Classical Archaeology, Ancient Greek, and Art History.

Since 2017, Jenny Wallensten is the director of the institute and Ruth Jacoby is chairman of the board. The institute is mainly financed by the Swedish government through the Ministry of Education and Swedish private foundations provide the remaining funds.

== General information ==
According to the statutes of the Swedish Institute at Athens, the mission of the institute is to conduct research into the culture of ancient Greece, provide higher education in the field in order to enrich our own culture, and stimulate and support the cultural exchange between Sweden and Greece. The activities of the institute are mainly carried out in Greece and include education and research linked to the archaeology, history, and society, of ancient and modern Greece.

Greek law states that the foreign archaeological schools should administer all archaeological research in Greece conducted by scholars of their home countries. Terms for conducting archaeological fieldwork in Greece include that the schools present recent work during a yearly open meeting, publish results in an international journal, and keep a research library open that is accessible to Greek and foreign scholars.

The Swedish Institute at Athens organizes and hosts seminars, lecture series, conferences, and workshops on various topics. The institute offers scholarships to postgraduate students, scholars at Swedish universities, or Swedish scholars working outside Sweden, who wish to conduct work in Greece. The Nordic Library, operating through a partnership between the Swedish, Danish, Finnish and Norwegian institutes in Athens, holds circa 40 000 volumes, mainly Classical Archaeology and Ancient History. In collaboration with institutions of higher education in Sweden, the institute offers courses on undergraduate and advanced level. Several activities that the institute organizes are related to art and culture, including poetry reading and language exchanges between Swedish and Modern Greek in particular. The institute is also involved in hosting and organizing lectures and seminars dealing with various social issues. The Swedish Institute at Athens is responsible for the Kavala Guesthouse in northern Greece, that offers temporary housing for Swedish artists, authors, and researchers.

The institute has increased its activities in Sweden during recent years. Recurrent events now includes Grekiska filmdagar (Greek Film Days) in October, and the Annual Meeting where the work of the institute is presented. The events in Sweden are often collaborations between the Swedish Institute in Athens, the Swedish Institute of Classical Studies in Rome, and the Swedish Research Institute in Istanbul.

== The History of the Institute ==
Greek authorities encouraged the foundation of a Swedish archaeological research institute already during the 1920s and 1930s. However, as the Swedish Institute of Classical Studies was founded in 1926 this did not occur at the time.

Swedish crown prince Gustaf Adolf, later crowned Gustaf VI Adolf, was engaged in the project at an early stage. The possibility of establishing a research institute in Greece was reinvigorated during the 1940s. Einar Gjerstad, professor of classical archaeology and ancient history at Lund University, was a driving force in the establishment of the institute after the Second World War. The Swedish businessman Herbert Jacobsson and his Greek colleague Eugenios Eugenides contacted Axel Boethius, then a professor in Classical archaeology and former director of the Swedish Institute of Classical Studies in Rome. The institute was established in Stockholm in 1946. In 1947, the archaeologist Erik J. Holmberg travelled to Athens to initiate the founding the institute. The Swedish Institute at Athens was finally inaugurated in 1948, becoming the seventh foreign archaeological institute founded in Greece, and the first one since 1909. Originally the institute was located at Vouourestiou Street in the area of Kolonaki in Athens. In 1975 the Greek government authorized its status as a so-called Archaeological School. Following this the institute moved to its current premises in 1976 on the corner of Mitseon and Kavalotti, near the New Acropolis Museum and several sites of historical importance.

In 2014 the three Swedish Mediterranean institutes ("Medelhavsinstituten") were threatened with closure after a radical reduction of funds was proposed in the Swedish Government's budget bill of 2015; the Swedish Minister of Education Helene Hellmark Knutsson proposed a halving of grants by 2016 and an ending by 2017. The proposal was withdrawn after massive protests.

== Archaeological work ==
The earliest Swedish excavations in Greece were carried out in 1894 through the German archaeological school. This was followed by work by Swedish archaeologists in e.g. Aphidna, Asine and Dendra. Since the foundation of the Swedish Institute in Athens in 1948 all work by Swedish archaeologists in Greece falls under its aegis. Currently active projects include the excavations at the Sanctuary of Poseidon at Kalaureia (Poros) in the Saronic Gulf, various forms of work at the ancient city of Hermione at the tip of the Argolid Peninsula, explorations at Vlochos in (Thessaly) and Pergamos (Macedonia). Previous sites for projects include Aphidna (Attica), Asine (Argolis), Agios Elias (Arcadia), Berbati (Argolis), Chania Kastelli (Crete), Dendra (Argolis), Malthi (Messenia), Midea (Argolis), Paradeisos (Western Thrace), and surveys at Asea (Arcadia), and Makrakomi (Phthiotis).

== Current projects ==
=== The sanctuary of Poseidon on Kalaureia (1894 and 1997 – ongoing) ===
The earliest Swedish archaeological fieldwork in Greece was carried out in the Sanctuary of Poseidon at Kalaureia in 1894, under the direction of Sam Wide and Lennart Kjellberg. Wide initiated and raised funds for the project. Kalaureia was one of several archaeological sites that had been proposed by the German archaeologist Wilhelm Dörpfeld who also came to act as an advisor for the project. In 1894, Dörpfeld, Wide, and Kjellberg, visited the Sanctuary of Poseidon at Kalaureia together. At that time, only some remains were visible above ground and Wide made the decision to carry out excavations during the journey. The excavations of the summer of 1894 lasted from June 11 until August 13. During the excavations, efforts concentrated on uncovering the architecture of the sanctuary and finds included bronze statuettes, inscriptions and various votives. No further excavations were carried out at Kalaureia until 1997. Archaeological projects since then include the Kalaureia Excavation Project (2003–2005) directed by Berit Wells, and The Sea, the City and the God (2007–2012), initially directed by Berit Wells and later Arto Penttinen. The latter is currently the director of the excavations at Kalaureia. Since 2012, excavations have been conducted at the site every year, except in 2020. The project has aimed to study the relationship between the Sanctuary of Poseidon and the ancient city of Kalaureia.

=== Hermione, the Argolid (2015 – ongoing) ===
The project A Greek cityscape and its people: a study of ancient Hermione, in the Argolid, was initiated in 2015 as a collaboration between the Ephorate of Antiquities of Argolida and the Swedish Institute at Athens. The general director for the project is Alcestis Papadimitriou, while Jenny Wallensten is responsible for the Swedish part. The aim of the field project is to explore the civic life in a Greek city state from the Archaic to Imperial periods. Studies have concerned buildings, family life, community structures and religious practices, including burial practices. Digital methods have been developed and employed to map out the extent and plan of the ancient city without having to resort to large-scale excavation.

=== Vlochos, Thessaly (2016 – ongoing) ===
The current archaeological fieldwork in Vlochos, Thessaly, (The Vlochos Archaeological Project) is a collaboration between the Swedish Institute at Athens and the Ephorate of Antiquities of Karditsa. It is under the General Directorship of Maria Vaïopoulou, director of the Ephorate, with Robin Rönnlund being the director for the Swedish side. The aim of the project is to investigate the hill of the site of Strongilvouni and its surroundings. Extensive remains of a large fortification, from the Archaic to Hellenistic periods, have been located on the hilltop. In 2016 media reported extensively about the site. Even if the results from the geophysical surveys were impressive, the presentation given in media was misleading.

=== Pergamos, Macedonia (2024 - ongoing) ===
After preliminary surveys in 2021 and 2022 the Swedish Institute initiated a field project in collaboration with the Ephorate of Antiquities of Kavala with the title The Ancient Pergamos Project. Patrik Klingborg and Georgia Galani are directing the project from the Swedish side, and Stavroula Dadaki from the Greek side. The project aims at establishing the chronology of the site, and to gain a better understanding of its role in the surrounding area. The project also aims at making new information about the site available for both an academic and a general audience. The project published its first article in November 2024, with a thorough description of the history of the area together with interpretations pertaining to its chronology. With the exception of field surveys no previous archaeological investigation of the site has taken place.

== Previous projects ==
=== Aphidna, Attica (1894) ===
Aphidna was one of Atticas twelve demes during the Classical period, located in northeast Attica and protecting the north borders of the region. Following the excavations at the Sanctuary of Poseidon at Kalaureia, Sam Wide decided to initiate an investigation in Aphidna. Mycaenean sherds, three graves, and a grave mound were found on site. The grave mound was excavated, after a permit had been issued by the Greek authorities. The finds dated the Bronze Age and included bronze- and silver vessels, and several spindle whorls.

=== Asine, Argolis (1922, 1924, 1930, 1970–1974, 1976–1978, 1985, 1989–1990) ===
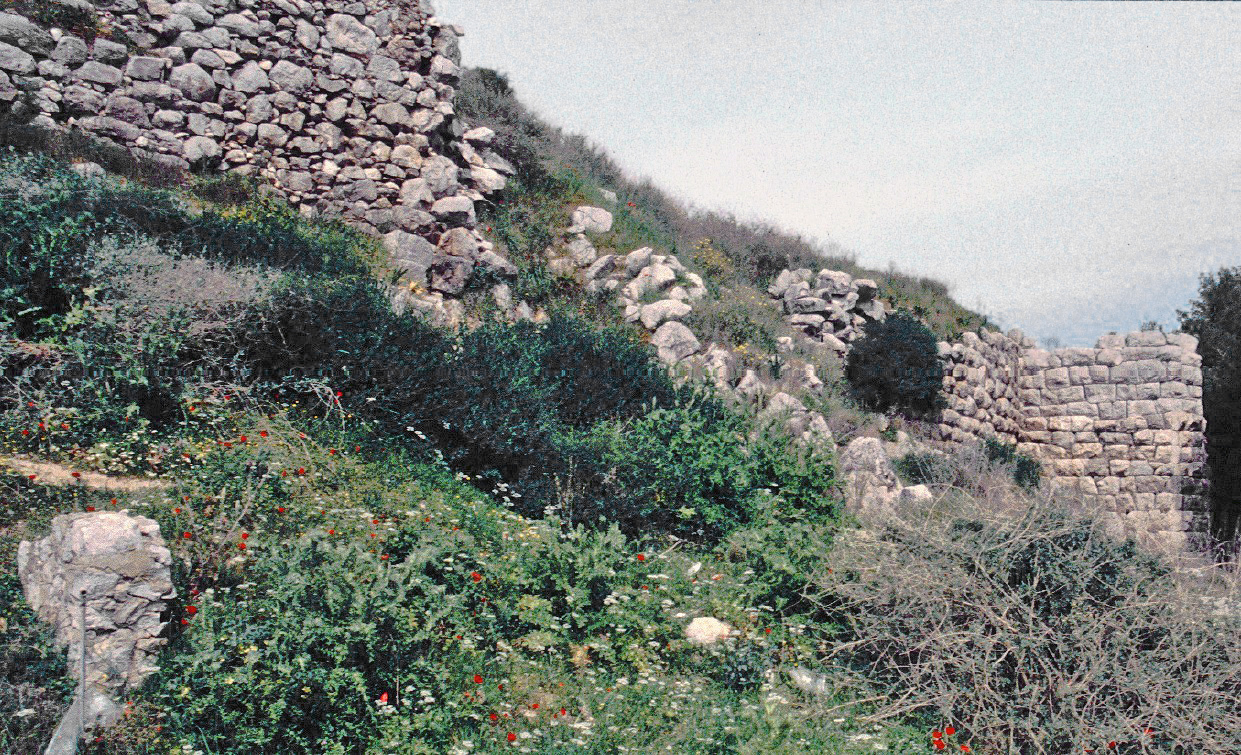
Hellenistic and later walls at Asine (Argolid), a Swedish excavation since the 1920s

The acropolis of Asine is located on a promontory in the Argolic Gulf, approximately 10 km southwest of modern Nafplion. Archaeological evidence demonstrates more or less continuous inhabitation from the Neolithic period. The neighboring city state of Argos razed the town of Asine around 700 BC. Since the 1920s, Swedish archaeologists have periodically carried out excavations at Asine. The first excavation was initiated on behalf of the Crown Prince Gustaf Adolf of Sweden in 1922. Early excavations at Asine concentrated on the acropolis hilltop and the finds included roof tiles and vast amounts of pottery. Following a hiatus of nearly forty years, excavations at Asine were resumed in the 1970s under the leadership of Director Carl-Gustaf Styrenius. The final Swedish excavations were conducted under the leadership of Berit Wells in 1989–1990.

=== Dendra, Argolis (1926–1927, 1937, 1962–1963) ===
The earliest Swedish excavations at Dendra in the Argolid were carried out 1926–1927, under the leadership of archaeologist Axel W. Persson. Persson had previously investigated a Mycenean tholos grave on the site when he identified several chamber tombs from the same period. Excavations were carried out during two field campaigns in 1937 and 1939. Following World War II, archaeologist Paul Åström resumed the field work at Dendra in collaboration with the local authorities. The project was subsequently coordinated as a Greek-Swedish collaboration. In 1960 the remarkable so-called Dendra harness was recovered from a chamber tomb dating to the 13th century BC. The Dendra harness is currently being exhibited at the Archaeological Museum of Nafplio.

=== Malthi, Messenia (1927–1929, 1933–1934, 1952, 2015–2017) ===
Malthi, one of the offshoots of the Ramovounis mountain range in Messenia, held a fortified settlement during the Bronze Age. Since the 1920s Swedish archaeologists have been studying the settlement, beginning with Natan Valmin in 1926. Valmin was shown two tholos graves when he travelled the area and later had them excavated. When the fieldwork was resumed on the hill in 1933–1934, archaeologists discovered several layered strata from a minor settlement underneath a thin layer of soil. However, Valmin's research has been re-evaluated afterwards. Michael Lindblom and Rebecca Worsham resumed field work at Malthi 2015–2017. The purpose of the new excavations was to correct inaccuracies of the dating of the archaeological strata that previously had been identified by Valmin. Field work included minor excavations with the aim to further elucidate the stratigraphy and topography of the site.

=== Berbati Valley, Argolis (1935–1938, 1953, 1959, 1988–1990, 1994–1995, 1997, 1999) ===
Swedish archaeologists have been conducting field work in the Berbati Valley since the 1930s. More recent investigations have also come to include valleys Limnes and Miyio, located east of Berbati. Archaeological excavations in the area were initiated in 1934, when Axel W. Person, Gösta Säflund, and Erik J. Holmberg travelled the area in search of potential sites for excavations. The Mastos hilltop, located in the southwest of the Berbati Valley, appeared to be the most promising location. Excavations in the following years included explored a tholos grave and the work continued until 1938. Because of World War II, excavations were then interrupted until the 1950s. During 1953 and 1959 field work in the area was conducted by Åke Åkerström. From 1988 Berit Wells directed the field work, including the Berbati Valley Project which was initiated in 1994. The aim of the project was to study agricultural economics in the area. In 1999, the work in the Berbati Valley came to an end after an extensive survey.

=== Asea Valley, Arcadia (1936–1938, 1994–1996, 1997, 2000) ===
The city state of Asea was located in the Asea Valley during the 6th–4th centuries BC, between ancient Tegea and Megalopolis in the central Peloponnese. The location was favorable, since it situated the city on the main route between Argolis and Corinth, in the east, and Olympia, in the west. Erik J. Holmberg conducted the earliest excavations on the acropolis situated on the Paleokastro hill in 1936–1938. Archaeological remains from the Neolithic, Bronze Age, and Hellenistic period were discovered. Field work at Asea was resumed with The Asea Valley Survey between 1994 and 1996 under the direction of Jeanette Forsén. Further geophysical surveys were conducted around the Palaeokastro hill 2001–2012.

=== Midea, Argolid (1939, 1963, 1983–2009) ===
Midea is situated on a hilltop approximately halfway between Tiryns and Mycaenae in the Argolid. The acropolis was heavily fortified, as early European travelers such as Leake, Gell, and Curtius noted. Strabo and Pausanias mention Midea in the ancient literary sources. Early investigations were carried out at the site under German direction in 1907. However, structures were first unearthed when Axel W. Persson carried out excavations in 1939. Under the direction of Persson, archaeologists investigated the extent of the walls and dug several test trenches. Paul Åström and Nikolais Verdelis resumed work at the site in 1963 and carried out a new small-scale excavation near the east gate of the Citadel. Extensive excavations were first carried out in 1983, in the form of a Greek-Swedish collaboration under the leadership of Katie Demakopoulou and Paul Åström. The project was resumed by Ann-Louise Schallin after 2000. Investigations at Midea revealed that the fortification was built during the second half of the 13th century and destroyed by fire not long after.

=== Kastelli Hill, Chania (1969–2014) ===
Kastelli Hill is located in the city of Chania on west Crete. Archaeological evidence indicates continuous inhabitation from the Neolithic until present time, except for a minor hiatus during the Late Bronze Age. Yannis Tzedakis, former director-general of the Archaeological Authorities of the Ministry of Culture of Greece, initiated excavations at Kastelli Hill 1964–1969. The then director of the Swedish Institute at Athens Carl-Gustav Styrenius was contacted to discuss a potential collaboration and the Greek-Swedish collaboration was initiated in 1969. Since the 1970s Danish archaeologists made significant contributions to the project. Swedish archaeologists carried out new excavations 1989–1990 and in 2010 the Danish Institute at Athens joined the project as a full participant, a collaboration that continued until the end of active field work in 2014. During excavations, extensive remains of structures and large amounts of pottery were uncovered. Among the more spectacular founds were two Linear A tablets and several seal stamps.

=== Paradeisos, Thrace (1976) ===
Paradeisos is located in the modern region East Macedonia and Thrace. Archaeologists Erik J. Holmberg and Pontus Hellström travelled through Paradeisos in North Greece searching of potential excavation sites in 1975. A decision was made to carry out excavations at the site in the following year, based on the previous finds from the Late Neolithic to the Bronze Age reported by R. Felsch. Four smaller trenches were dug. Finds included approximately 400 kg of pottery and several figurines from the late Neolithic. Finds from the excavation are currently being stored in the Archaeological Museum of Kavala.

=== Makrakomi, Fthiotis (2010–2015) ===
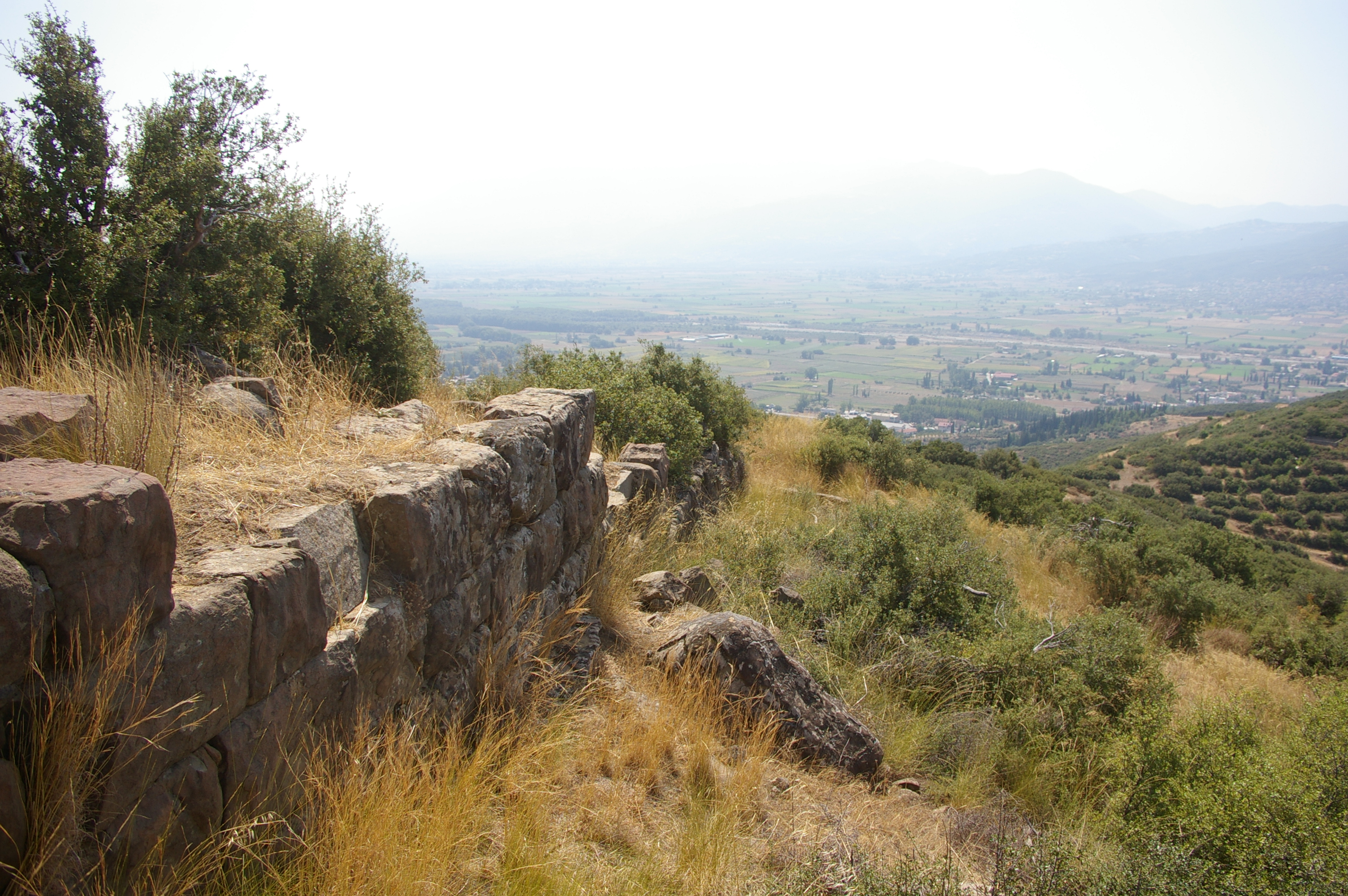
Macra Come, Fthiotis, examined by the Institute since 2010.

The Makrakomi Archaeological Landscapes Project (MALP) was carried out around the village of Makrakomi in the Spercheios valley with the aim of exploring the ancient history of the area. The valley was particularly important during the late classical and Hellenistic periods as it hosts a route connecting the north and south of parts Greece. The project was a collaboration between the Fthiotis and Evritania Ephorate of Antiquities, under the direction of Maria Foteini Papakonstantionou and Swedish archaeologist Anton Bonnier. Fieldwork included surveys, geophysical investigations, small scale excavation, and geomorphological studies. An archaeological and architectonic inventory was carried out 2011–2012. Investigations have demonstrated human activity in the valley from the Neolithic until the Late Classical period, when settlements became more long-lived before they faded away during the Roman period.

== Publications ==
The Swedish Institute at Athens publishes the journal Opuscula. Annual of the Swedish Institutes at Athens and Rome together with the Swedish Institute of Classical Studies in Rome through the Editorial Committee of the Swedish Institutes at Athens and Rome (ECSI). This includes reports on the fieldwork carried out under the aegis of the institute as well as other scientific articles relating to antiquity. The Swedish Institute in Athens also publishes Skrifter utgivna av Svenska institutet i Athen, 4˚ and Skrifter utgivna av Svenska institutet i Athen, 8˚.

== Cultural activities ==
Promoting and stimulating cultural exchange between Sweden and Greece is one of the main missions of the Swedish Institute at Athens. Several cultural activities are organized annually, including book presentations, art and photo exhibitions, concerts, and film screenings. In the beginning, it was mostly a matter of presenting Swedish culture in Greece. However, Greek culture has increasingly come to be presented in Sweden in recent years. For example, the film festival Grekiska filmdagar (“Greek film days”) that is devoted to modern and contemporary Greek film. The Swedish Institute at Athens is also involved in a collaboration with the Swedish art school Konstfack and the Athens School of Fine Arts. The aim of the project is to promote crafts made in silk. Within the framework of this seminars are organized in the silk producing city of Soufli in Northern Greece. The institute is also involved in a collaboration between Fridhems Folkhögskola in Sweden and the Ionian University jazz program, with the purpose of bringing Greek and Swedish jazz musicians together during The Kavala Jazz Sessions and Corfu Masterclasses.

== The Kavala Guesthouse ==
The Swedish Institute at Athens is responsible for a guesthouse in the city of Kavala in northern Greece. The house in Kavala was originally built to house employees at the Swedish tobacco monopoly during the early 20th century when the city was an important center for the trade of tobacco. The property was bought in 1934 and the building itself was built in 1936. The building was designed by the Greek architecture Panagiotis Manouilidis and constitutes a rare and well-preserved example of Greek architecture in the Bauhaus style from that period. The house can be described as an airy building with a light and smooth facade, flat roof, and functional interior design. In the wake of World War II the city of Kavala lost its position as a prominent production center of tobacco. In 1963 the new director of the Swedish tobacco monopoly Olof Söderström who had a cultural interest decided to transform the house in Kavala into a guesthouse for Swedish artists and researchers. The tobacco monopoly began to investigate the potential to sell the house in 1973. However, the house was instead donated to the Swedish Institute at Athens after lengthy negotiations. The contract was finally signed at the Swedish embassy on June 6, 1976, after persistent efforts from several persons, including Sweden's then Ambassador Agda Rössel and the Director of the Swedish Institute at Athens Pontus Hellström. Today, the Kavala guesthouse offers a stimulating and environment for Swedish writers, artists, and researchers.

== List of directors ==
- Erik Holmberg 1947–1948
- Åke Åkerström 1948–1956
- Arne Furumark 1956–1957
- Paul Åström 1958–1963
- Carl-Gustaf Styrenius 1963–1971
- Åke Åkerström 1971–1972
- Pontus Hellström 1972–1976
- Robin Hägg 1976–1994
- Berit Wells 1994–2003
- Ann-Louise Schallin 2004–2010
- Arto Penttinen 2010–2016
- Jenny Wallensten 2017–present

== See also ==
- Swedish Institute

== Bibliography ==
- E. Korka et al. (eds.): Foreign Archaeological Schools in Greece, 160 Years, Athens, Hellenic Ministry of Culture, 2006, p. 144–151.
