= Axel W. Persson =

Swedish archaeologist (1888–1951)

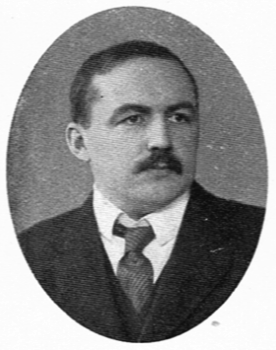
Axel Waldemar Persson. 1938

Axel Waldemar Persson (1 June 1888 – 7 May 1951) was a Swedish archaeologist. He was professor of classical archaeology and ancient history at Uppsala University and conducted excavations of sites in Greece and in Asia Minor.

== Biography ==
Persson was born at Kvidinge in Skåne County, Sweden. He studied at Lund University, as well as at the universities of Göttingen and Berlin. He conducted a study trip to France, Italy, Greece and Asia Minor during 1920–21.

He excavated sites in the Argolid in Greece, including Asine, Dendra and Midea, as well as other sites in Asia Minor including Milas and Labraunda, searching for the origins of the Linear B writing system. In the summer of 1926, he excavated an unpaved tholos tomb at Dendrá in Argolis The finds were added to the National Archaeological Museum, Athens. In 1935, he excavated a prehistoric hill at Gencik Tepe in south-eastern Anatolia region of Turkey and Hellenistic chamber tombs at Milas. In 1937, he returned to Dendrá where he excavated a chamber tomb.

Persson became an associate professor at Lund University in 1915 and a professor at Uppsala University from 1924. He was professor of classical archaeology and ancient history at Uppsala University until his retirement in 1951. He was of great importance as an inspiring teacher. His graduates, including Åke Åkerström and Einar Gjerstad, made significant contributions to the field of archaeology.

== Personal life ==
He was married during 1913 to Victoria Mirea (1887–1958), He died during 1951 and was buried at Uppsala gamla kyrkogård.

== Other sources ==
- Chadwick, John (1990), The Decipherment of Linear B, Cambridge University Press, pp. 30–31, ISBN 978-0-521-39830-5.
- Furumark, Arne (1951), "Axel W. Persson", Minos. Revista de Filología Egea: 112.
- Gjersted, Einar (1980), Ages and Days in Cyprus, Studies in Mediterranean Archaeology, Pocket Books, pp. 9–10, archived from the original on 2011-07-07.
- Green, Erik (1953), "Bibliography of the writings of Axel W. Persson", Opuscula Atheniensia, 1: 224–236.
- Koşay, Hâmit Zübeir (1951), Axel Waldemar Persson 1888-1951 (in Turkish).
- Medwid, Linda M. (2000), "Axel W(aldemar) Persson", The makers of classical archaeology: a reference work, Humanity Books, pp. 237–239, ISBN 978-1-57392-826-7.
- The archaeological excavations at Milas and Gencik Tepe, 1938, Swedish Research Institute in Istanbul. Retrieved 2009-08-13.
- Labraunda: The Excavations, Swedish Excavations at Labraunda. Retrieved 2009-08-13.
