= Protogeometric style =

Ancient Greek pottery style, 1025–900 BC

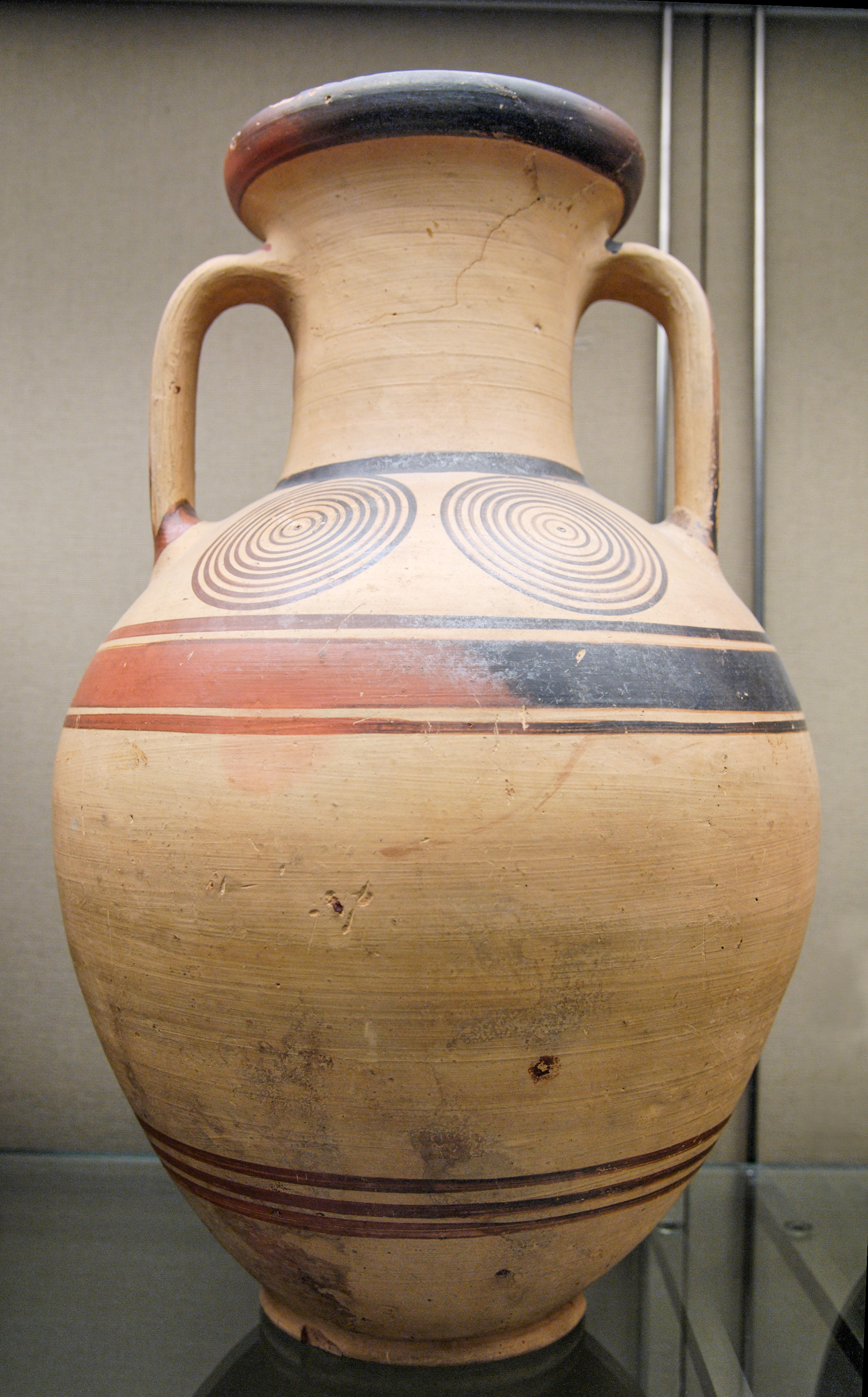
Proto-Geometric amphora c. 975–950 BCE. Athens, now British Museum.

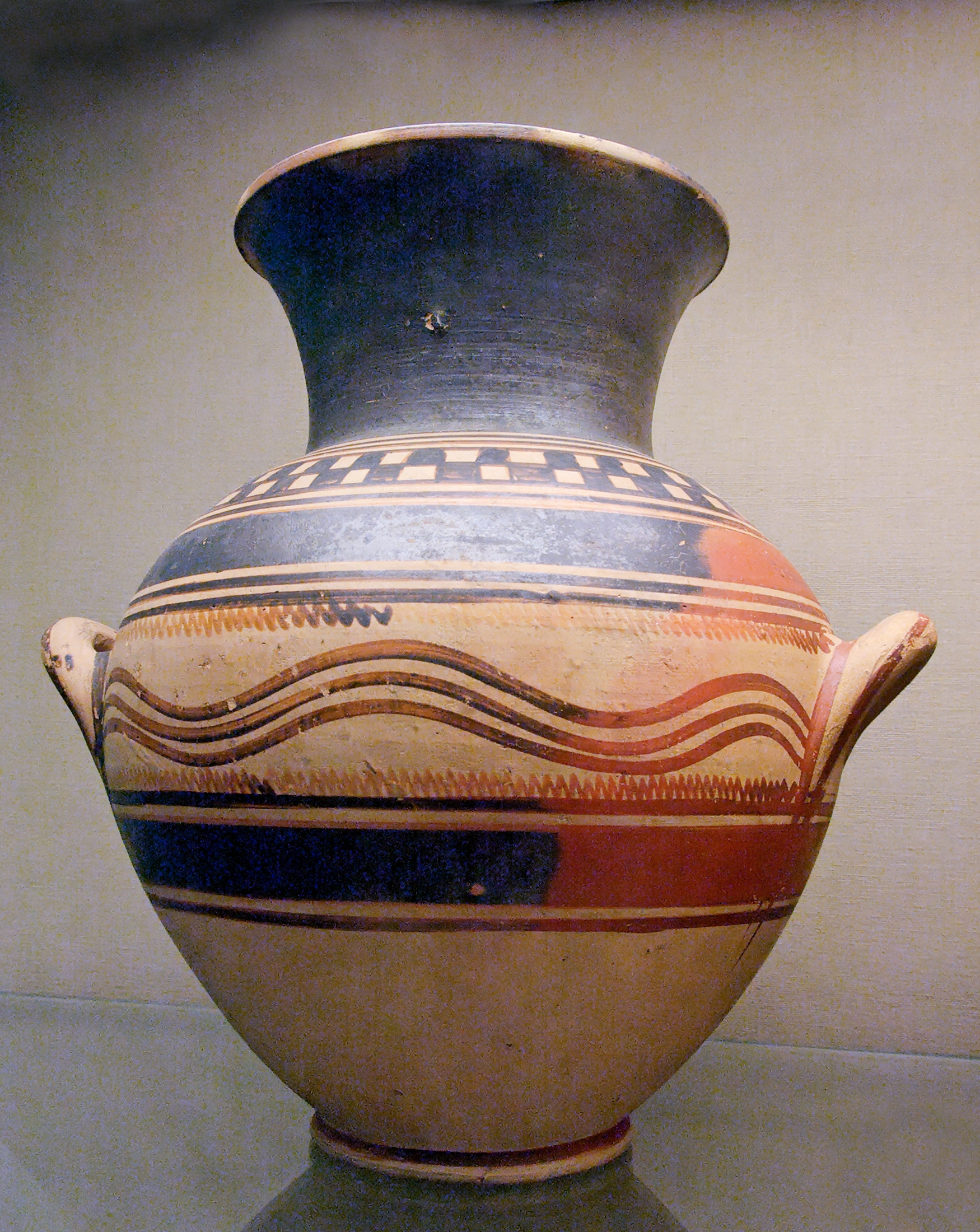
Proto-Geometric amphora c. 950–900 BCE

The Protogeometric style (or Proto-Geometric) is a style of Ancient Greek pottery led by Athens and produced, in Attica and Central Greece, between roughly 1025 and 900 BCE, during the Greek Dark Ages. It was succeeded by the Geometric style.

Earlier studies considered the beginning of this style around 1050 BCE.

== History ==
After the Late Bronze Age collapse and ensuing Greek Dark Ages, the Protogeometric style emerged around the late 11th century BCE, as the first expression of a reviving civilization. Following on from the development of a faster potter's wheel, vases of this period are markedly more technically accomplished than earlier Dark Age examples. From Athens the style spread to several other centres.

== Production and decoration ==
The decoration of these pots is restricted to purely abstract elements and very often includes broad horizontal bands about the neck and belly and concentric circles applied with compass and multiple brush. Many other simple motifs can be found, but unlike many pieces in the following Geometric style, typically much of the surface is left plain.

Like many pieces, the example illustrated includes a colour change in the main band, arising from a firing fault. Both the red and black colour use the same clay, differently levigated and fired. As the Greeks learnt to control this variation, the path to their distinctive three-phase firing technique opened.

Some of the innovations included some new Mycenean influenced shapes, such as the belly-handled amphora, the neck handled amphora, the krater, and the lekythos. Attic artists redesigned these vessels using the fast wheel to increase the height and therefore the area available for decoration.

== Chronology ==
Based on radiocarbon dating and Bayesian models to Lefkandi, Kalapodi and Corinth, Toffolo et al. (2013) placed the Sub-Mycenaean/Protogeometric transition "in the second half of the 11th century, approximately centered on 1025 BCE."

The archaeologist Alex Knodell divides the Protogeometric period into three sub-periods:

Ceramic period	Dates BCE
Early Protogeometric	1025–1000
Middle Protogeometric	1000–950
Late Protogeometric	950–900

== See also ==
- Mycenaean pottery
- Archaic period

== Sources ==
- Cook, R.M., Greek Art, Penguin, 1986 (reprint of 1972), ISBN 0140218661
- Lemos, Irene S. (2002). The Protogeometric Aegean, The Archaeology of the Late Eleventh and Tenth Centuries BC. Oxford University Press.
- Miller, D. Garry (2013). Ancient Greek Dialects and Early Authors, Introduction to the Dialect Mixture in Homer, with Notes on Lyric and Herodotus (PDF). De Gruyter.
- Murray, R. L. The Protogeometric Style: the first Greek style, Gothenburg, Paul Åströms (1975).
- Eiteljorg, H., "The fast wheel, the multiple brush compass and Athens as home of the Protogeometric style" American Journal of Archaeology (AJA) 84 (1980) pp. 445–452.
