= Asine =

Ancient Greek city of Argolis

Coordinates: 37°31′36″N 22°52′27″E

Asine (Greece)

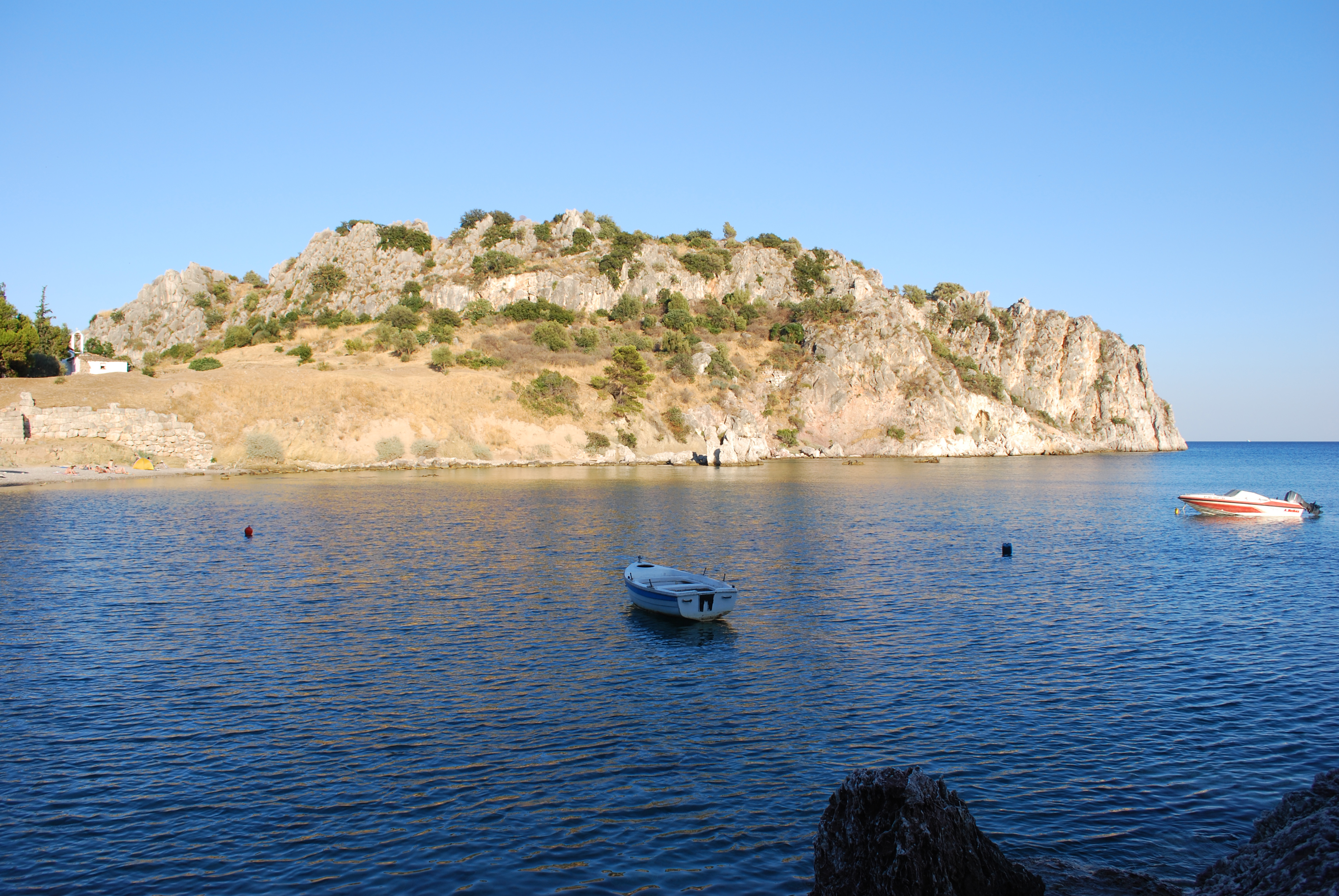
Kastraki and harbour

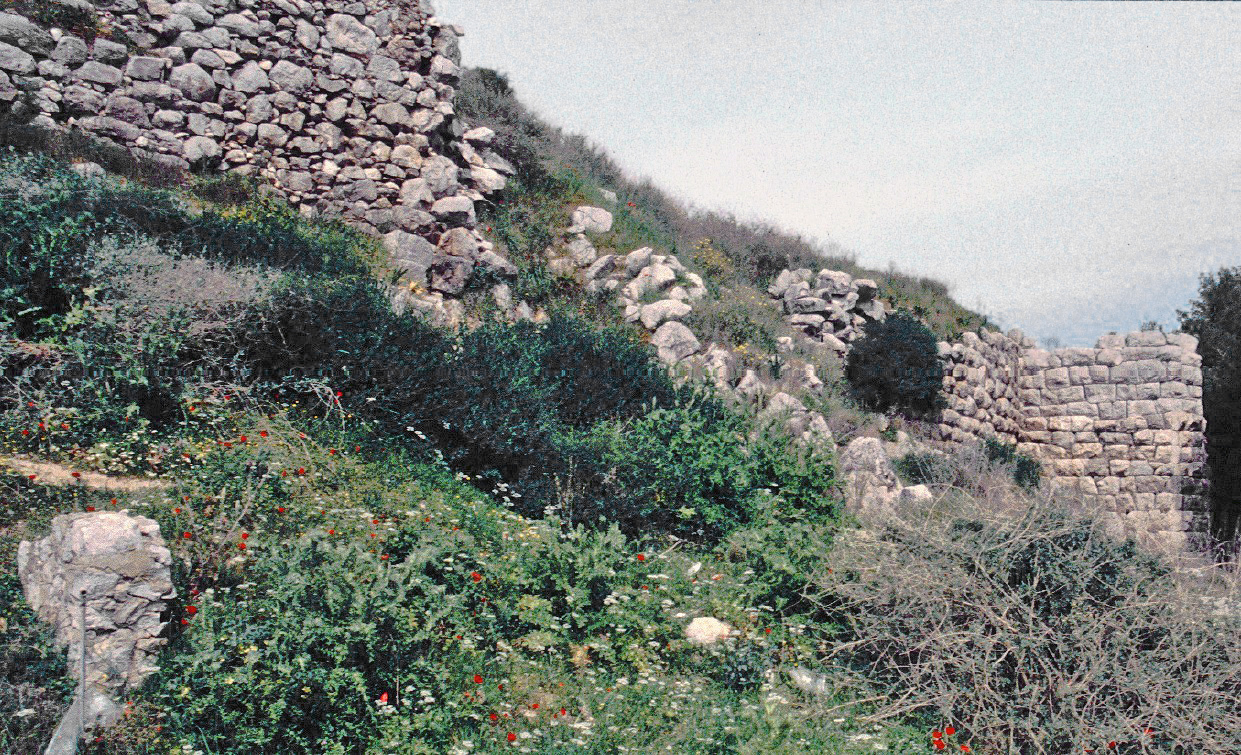
Cyclopean walls of Asine

Asine (/ˈæsɪniː/; Ancient Greek: Ἀσίνη) was an Ancient Greek city on the coast of ancient Argolis on a promontory locally known as Kastraki or Paliokastro near the modern village of Asine and Tolon.

The rocky peninsula measuring 330 x 150 m and rising 52 m above sea level had strategic advantages and its natural sheltered harbour played a key role in its development over the centuries.

== History ==
Habitation on Kastraki appears for the first time during the 3rd millennium BC in the Early Helladic period. The occupation of the Lower Town was intensive during the Middle Helladic, spreading to cover part of the opposite hill towards the end of this period. Finds from the settlement and chamber tombs of the Mycenaean period show a thriving community which had become rich due to their trade with the palaces of the Argolis and the centres beyond the Aegean.

The city is said to have been founded by the Dryopes, who originally dwelt on Mount Parnassus.

After 1700 BC the houses in the lower town became more elaborate with small courtyards and separated by narrow corridors. Many burials in cist graves, pits and pots located in and around the houses date to this period. The Mycenaean settlement here flourished mainly in or at the end of the 12th century BC. Among the simple houses, "House G" is visible as a megaron-type building with an anteroom, a central pillared hall and various rooms. In the northeast corner of the central hall, a stone bench was found with an assemblage of cult objects, including the terracotta head of a figurine known as the "Lord of Asine".

During the Geometric period, the Lower Town became a cemetery, while the settlement extended to the east of the promontory and to the southeastern slopes of the Barbouna Hill.

Homer mentions it in the Catalogue of Ships in the Iliad, a list of cities that sent ships to the Trojan campaign as part of the Argolic mission under the command of the Diomedes, king of Argos.

The sanctuary of Apollo Pythaeus dating from before 725 BC was found by excavation on the Barbouna hill.

According to Pausanias, in one of the early wars (late 8th c BC) between the Lacedaemonians and the Argives, the Asinaeans joined the former when they invaded the Argive territory under their king Nicander; but as soon as the Lacedaemonians returned home, the Argives laid siege to Asine and razed it to the ground, sparing only the sanctuary of Pythaëus Apollo. The Asinaeans escaped by sea; and the Lacedaemonians gave them, after the end of the First Messenian War, a portion of the Messenian territory, where they built a new town (also named Asine).

After the destruction of Asine the Lower Town was abandoned.

=== Revival in the Hellenistic Era ===
Small olive oil and wine presses, autonomous or incorporated into houses, were built on the Acropolis and in the Lower Town. They are similar in their arrangement with four-sided or circular tanks set into the floor for the collection of liquid, which flowed down the sloping floor into the reservoirs. Two of them still preserve the raised surface where the fruit was placed and the stone base with holes for securing the wooden press.

Nearly ten centuries after the destruction of the city its ruins were visited by Pausanias, who found the sanctuary of Apollo still visible.

A small Roman bath complex from the late 4th or early 5th century AD in the Lower Town is still visible.

During the Second World War, Italian troops built machine gun nests and bunkers on the site which destroyed many of the remains.

== Archaeology ==
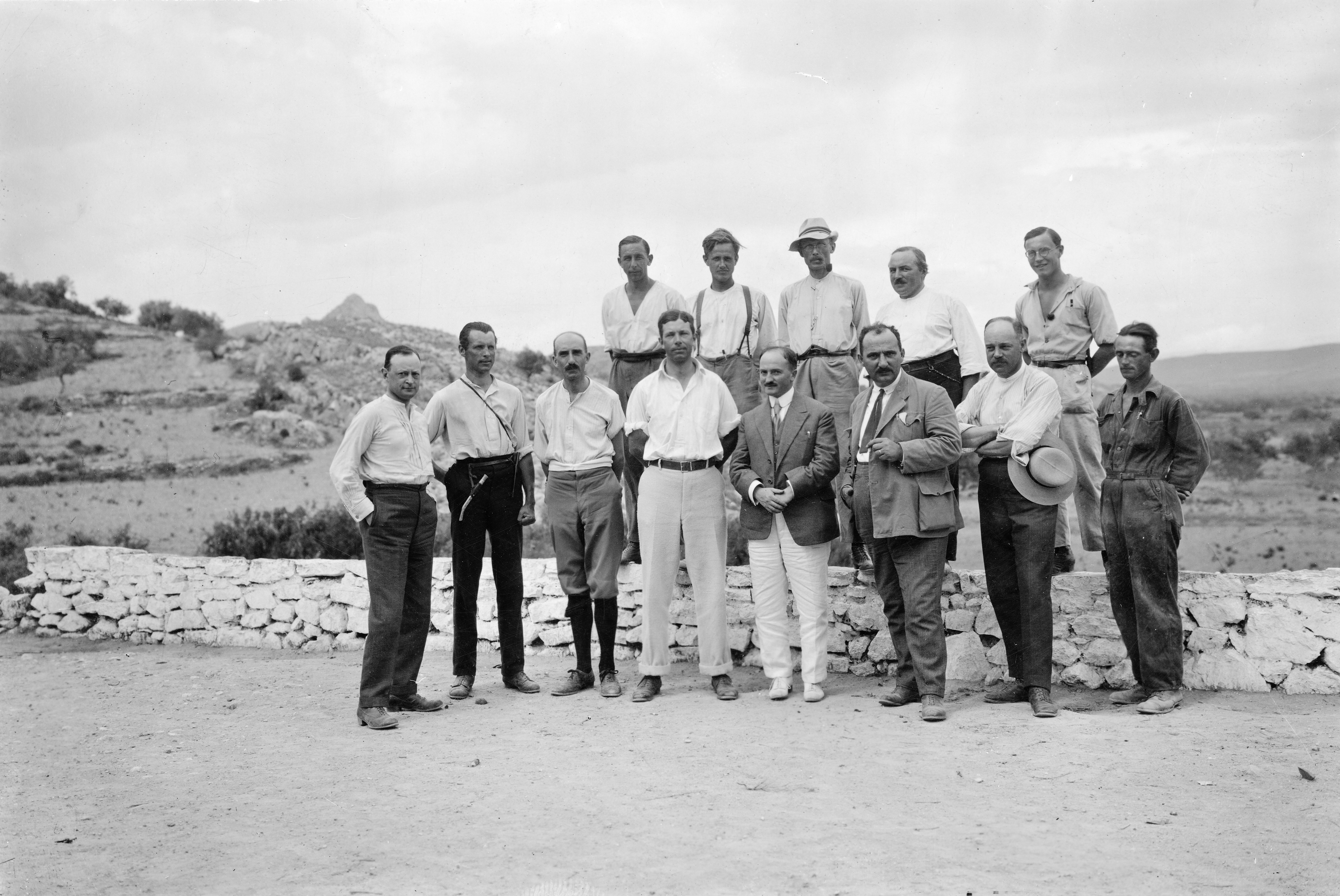
Swedish and visiting archaeologists, 1922.

Starting in 1922, Swedish archaeologists led by Axel W. Persson (and involving the Crown Prince Gustav Adolf of Sweden) found the acropolis of ancient Asine surrounded by a Cyclopean wall (much modified in the Hellenistic era) and a Mycenaean era necropolis with many Mycenaean chamber tombs containing skeletal remains and grave goods. Excavations have continued since then almost continuously under the Swedish Institute at Athens.

Underwater archaeology since 2020 has discovered remains of a large ancient port.

== See also ==
- List of ancient Greek cities
- Swedish Institute at Athens

== Sources ==
- Swedish Institute at Athens - Asine, Argolid: https://www.sia.gr/en/articles.php?tid=338&page=1
