= Penelope Mountjoy =

British archaeologist (1946–2025)

Penelope Mountjoy FSA
- Born: 1946; Bath, Somerset, England
- Died: 14 June 2025 (aged 78); Oxford, Oxfordshire, England

Academic background
- Education: University of Bristol; University of London

Academic work
- Discipline: Archaeology
- Sub-discipline: Pottery; Mycenaean archaeology
- Institutions: British School at Athens

Penelope Anne Mountjoy FSA (1946 – 14 June 2025) was a British archaeologist who specialised in Mycenaean ceramics. Mountjoy wrote several books and received numerous awards and fellowships to continue her research on Greek pottery.

== Early life and education ==
Mountjoy was born in Bath, Somerset, England in 1946. She received a Bachelor of Arts in classics from the University of Bristol and a Master of Philosophy from the University of London, before returning to Bristol for her Ph.D. She was a member of the British School at Athens.

== Career and honours ==
Mountjoy studied Mycenaean pottery of several periods, publishing multiple books on the subject. She was additionally a specialist in Minoan pottery. She also taught archaeological illustration at College Year in Athens, a programme for visiting US students. She was a recipient of a Seymour Gitin Distinguished Professor Fellowship from the Albright Institute of Archaeological Research in 2014 to study Mycenaean decorated pottery in Cyprus and the South Levant. She also obtained multiple Alexander von Humboldt Fellowships, a Glassman Holland Fellowship, and was elected as a Corresponding Member of the German Archaeological Institute. On 5 May 1988, she was also elected as a Fellow of the Society of Antiquaries of London (FSA).

== Death ==
Mountjoy died in Oxford on 14 June 2025, at the age of 78.

== Bibliography ==
=== Selected books ===
- 1983. (with Kunze, Emil) Orchomenos V: Mycenaean pottery from Orchomenos, Eutresis and other Boeotian sites (Abhandlungen 89). ISBN 978-3-7696-0084-1
- 1985. The Archaeology of cult: the sanctuary at Phylakopi (British School of Archaeology at Athens 18). London, British school of archaeology at Athens.
- 1986. Mycenaean Decorated Pottery: A Guide to Identification. Gothenburg.
- 1993. Mycenaean Pottery: An Introduction. Oxford University Press.
- 1999. Regional Mycenaean decorated pottery. Berlin, Deutsches Archäologisches Institut.
- 2008. The Mycenaean and the Minoan Pottery: the Johann Wolfgang Goethe University Collections. Weisbaden.
- 2003. Knossos the south house. The British School at Athens.
- 2017. Troy 9: Troy VI Middle, VI Late and VII. The Mycenaean Pottery. Habelt.
- 2018. Decorated Pottery in Cyprus and Philistia in the 12th Century BC: Cypriot IIIC and Philistine IIIC, Vols. I&II. Austrian Academy of Sciences. ISBN 978-3-7001-7955-9

=== Selected articles ===
- Betts, John H.; Davis, Jack L.; Palaima, Thomas G.; Goodison, Lucy; Mountjoy, Penelope; Fotou, Vasso; Easton, D. F. (1988). "Mycenaean Seminar 1986-8". Bulletin of the Institute of Classical Studies (35): 163–182. ISSN 0076-0730. JSTOR 43646219.
- Steel, Louise; Loader, Claire; Momigliano, Nicoletta; Driessen, J.; Day, Peter; Pini, Ingo; Hirschfeld, Nicole; Walberg, Gisela; Panayotakopoulou, Eva; Nowicki, Krzysztof; Phillips, Jacke (1997). "[Mycenaean Seminar 1996-97 and 1997-98]". Bulletin of the Institute of Classical Studies. 42: 203–245. ISSN 0076-0730. JSTOR 43636547.
- Renfrew, Colin; Brodie, Neil; Morris, Christine; Scarre, Chris; Barber, R. L. N.; Cherry, John F.; Davis, Jack L.; Daykin, Alec; Evans, R. K.; Morgan, Lyvia; Mountjoy, P. A. (2007). "Excavations at Phylakopi in Melos 1974-77". The British School at Athens. Supplementary Volumes (42): v–521. ISSN 1464-0813. JSTOR 40856115.
- Mountjoy, Penelope A. (2008). "A Mycenaean Vase from Megiddo". Bulletin of the American Schools of Oriental Research (349): 13–24. ISSN 0003-097X. JSTOR 25067054.
- Mountjoy, Penelope A. (2010). "A Note on the Mixed Origins of Some Philistine Pottery". Bulletin of the American Schools of Oriental Research (359): 1–12. ISSN 0003-097X. JSTOR 25741825.
- Master, Daniel M.; Mountjoy, Penelope A.; Mommsen, Hans (1 May 2015). "Imported Cypriot Pottery in Twelfth-Century B.C. Ashkelon". Bulletin of the American Schools of Oriental Research. 373: 235–243. doi:10.5615/bullamerschoorie.373.0235. ISSN 0003-097X.
- Mountjoy, Penelope A., et al. (2017) "The Sea Peoples: A View from the Pottery." in "Sea Peoples" Up-to-Date: New Research on Transformation in the Eastern Mediterranean in 13th-11th Centuries BCE, 1st ed., Austrian Academy of Sciences Press, pp. 355–78
