= Ephyraean style =

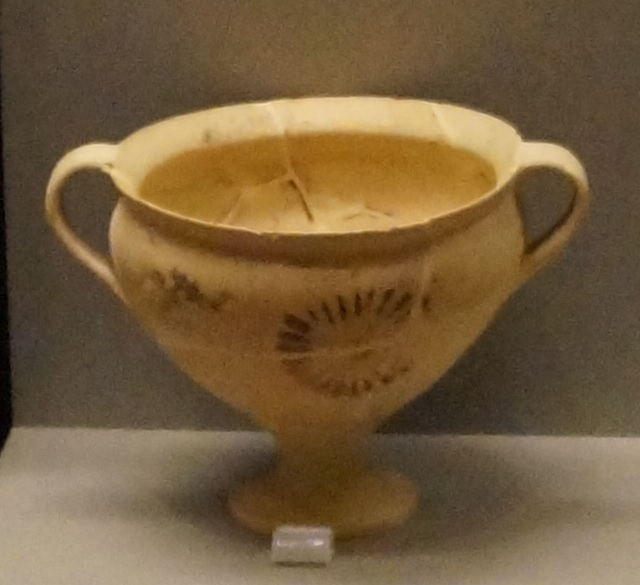
Ephyraean goblet from Prosymna (LH II B, mid-15th century BC)

The Ephyraean style is a distinctive type of Mycenaean pottery defined by a specific vessel, the Ephyraean goblet. This ware was first identified by archaeologist Carl Blegen during his excavations at Korakou, a site near Corinth. Blegen named the ware after Ephyra (Ancient Corinth), that he thought he was excavating.

The style's stratigraphic position places it firmly in the Late Helladic II (LH II) period (approx. 1450–1350 BC), and it is considered a key "date-mark" for this phase of the Mycenaean era. While other shapes, such as jugs, were sometimes decorated in the Ephyraean manner, the goblet is its most characteristic form.

== Goblets ==
=== Shape, origin, and fabric ===
The Ephyraean goblet is a decorated subdivision of Yellow Minyan ware, which itself is a refined development of Middle Helladic Grey Minyan ware.

Its characteristic shape—a one- or two-handled goblet with a short stem—is thought to be a direct imitation of metal vessels. This Helladic origin, derived from Minyan goblets, was emphasized by scholars like Persson and Wace, who refuted earlier theories by Arthur Evans that the shape had a Minoan origin.

The classic goblet has a specific shape:

- A short stem with a hollowed foot.
- A deep bowl with an everted (out-turned) lip.
- Two wide strap-handles.
- The average rim diameter is 16 cm, and the average height is 14 cm.

A less common variation exists, featuring a shallower bowl and a raised, concave base, which may be a later development within the LH IIB period.

The fabric is a key identifier. The clay, which varies from pinkish-buff to greenish-yellow, is hard-baked. The surface is smoothed, beautifully finished with a good polish, and covered with a slip of the same color. The lustrous paint varies from an orangey-red to a purple-brown or almost black, with variations in tone often appearing on a single vase due to the firing process.

=== Proportions and aesthetics ===
A primary feature of the Ephyraean goblet is its harmonious proportions, which Wace described as its "greatest attraction." The design is marked by a sophisticated sense of balance:

- The body and foot are "wonderfully adjusted" in size and shape to each other.
- The handles are "exactly calculated" in length and width to suit the body and lip.
- The everted lip has the precise width and curve to fit the size of the bowl.

This formal balance is matched by the decoration. The style avoids the horror vacui (fear of empty space) common in other prehistoric pottery. The decorative motifs are restrained, and the "pattern does not overload the field." This "limitation, simplicity, and admirable drawing" is beautifully adapted to the form, giving the entire vessel a sense of "true fitness and breeding."

=== Decoration ===
The decorative scheme is precise and minimal. On a Mainland Ephyraean goblet, decoration is confined to the two fields on either side of the vessel, between the handles.

A single, central motif is painted in each field. A small subsidiary motif — such as a small quirk, chevron, or curl—is sometimes placed at the very bottom of the handles where they join the body. The rest of the vase is left unpainted. The lip is "practically never" painted, and the inside is "rarely" painted.

The motifs are stylized and typically divide into two main classes: Floral and Marine. FM designations refer to Furumark's classification:

- Marine: The favorite and most common motif is the Argonaut (FM 22).
- Floral: This class includes the Rosette (FM 17), Lily (FM 9), Palm (FM 14), Crocus, and Iris.

Rarer motifs include the Group Spiral (FM 47) and the Running Spiral (FM 46).

=== Mainland vs. Cretan Style ===
The Ephyraean goblet originated on the Greek mainland, and its appearance on Crete in the Late Minoan II (LM II) period was an imitation of the mainland style, which Wace argued was artistically superior.

The Cretan-made versions, dated to LM II by finds at Knossos and Katsambas (Heraklion), can be distinguished from the mainland originals in several key ways:

- Fabric: The Cretan fabric is "less good," and the clay and surface "tend to be softer."
- Proportions: The proportions are "less well planned."
- Paint: Cretan goblets are often painted on the inside with a brown-black paint, and the lip frequently has a painted band—features "practically never" seen on mainland examples.
- Decoration: The decorative motifs on Cretan versions are "larger in proportion" and "nearly always appear too big for the goblet," in contrast to the restrained, balanced mainland style.

=== Chronology and distribution ===
The Ephyraean goblet is a key chronological marker for the LH IIB period. Evidence suggests it originated on the mainland during the LM IB period on Crete and was no longer being manufactured by the end of LH IIB. This is supported by the deposit from the Atreus Bothros at Mycenae, which dates to the subsequent LH IIIA1 period and contained very few Ephyraean sherds, suggesting they were already out of production.

The style had a wide distribution. It has been found throughout the Peloponnese (Argolis, Corinthia, Laconia, Messenia), in central Greece (Attica, Boeotia), and as an import on numerous islands, including Phylakopi on Melos, Ialysos on Rhodes, Kea, and Kythera.

== Other vessel shapes ==
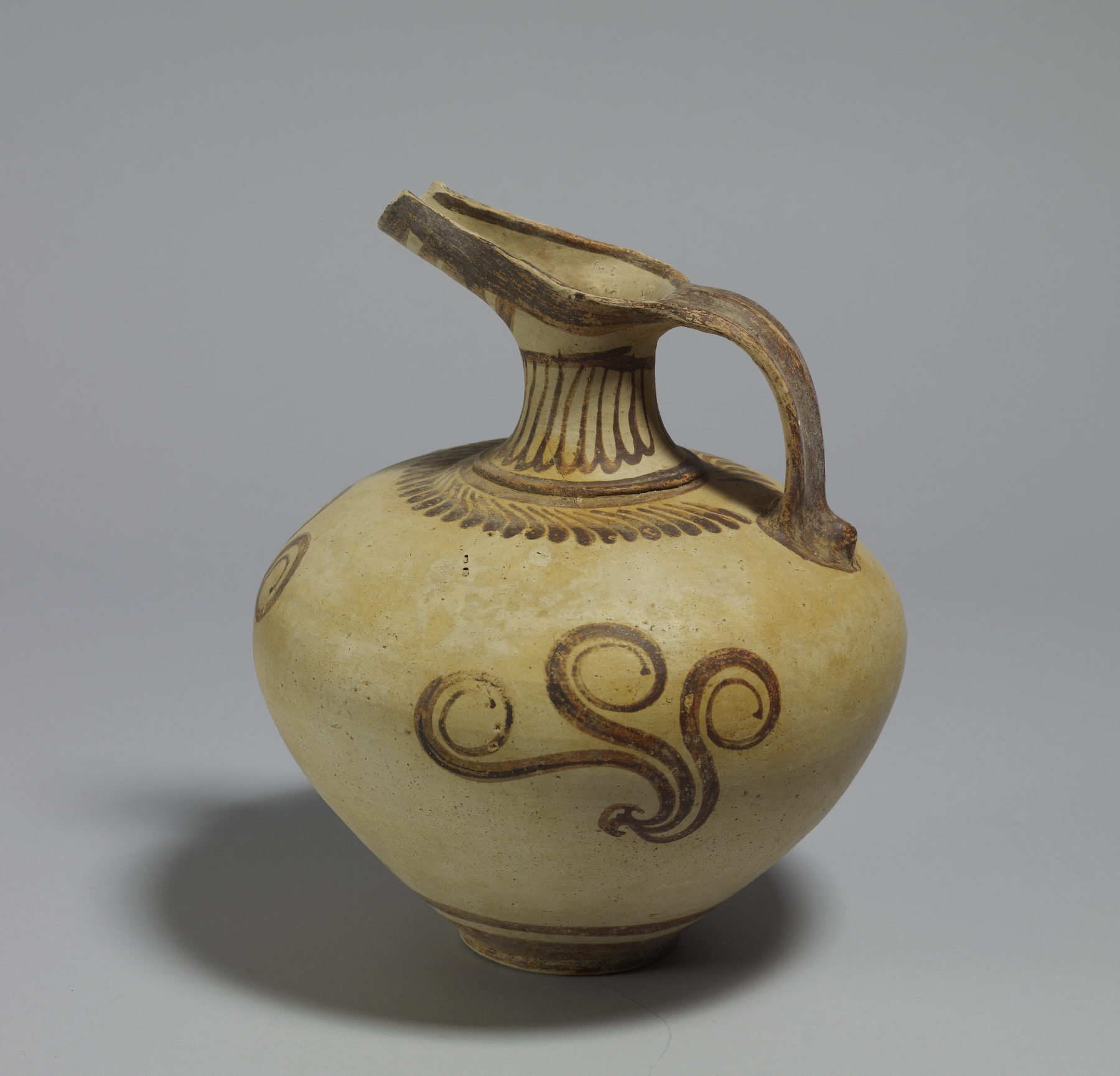
Ephyraean jug from Mycenae, 1420–1370 BC (LH IIB–LH IIIA1)

In addition to the Ephyraean goblets, jugs with corresponding decoration are also considered part of the Ephyraean style. These are bulbous jugs with a beak-shaped spout and one handle. They usually bear similar motifs on three sides, much like the goblets. The neck and shoulder of the vessel are also decorated, while the foot is kept dark.

Ephyraean jugs have been found in the settlements of Mycenae and Korakou and in the tombs of Athens, Chalkida, Iolkos, Pylos, and Ialysos.

== Sources ==
- Mountjoy, P. A. (1983). "The Ephyraean Goblet Reviewed". The Annual of the British School at Athens. 78: 265–271. doi:10.1017/S0068245400019717.
- Taylour, William (1983). The Mycenaeans. Ancient Peoples and Places. London: Thames & Hudson. ISBN 9780500021033.
- Evans, Arthur (1935). The Palace of Minos. Vol. 4, Part 1. London: Macmillan and Co.
- Wace, Alan (1956). "Part II. Ephyraean Ware". The Annual of the British School at Athens. 51: 123–127. doi:10.1017/S0068245400018815.
