= Stirrup jar =

Bronze Age style of pottery

- Linear B ka-ra-re-we, probably krairēwes from κραῖρα, "head, extremity, protrusion".
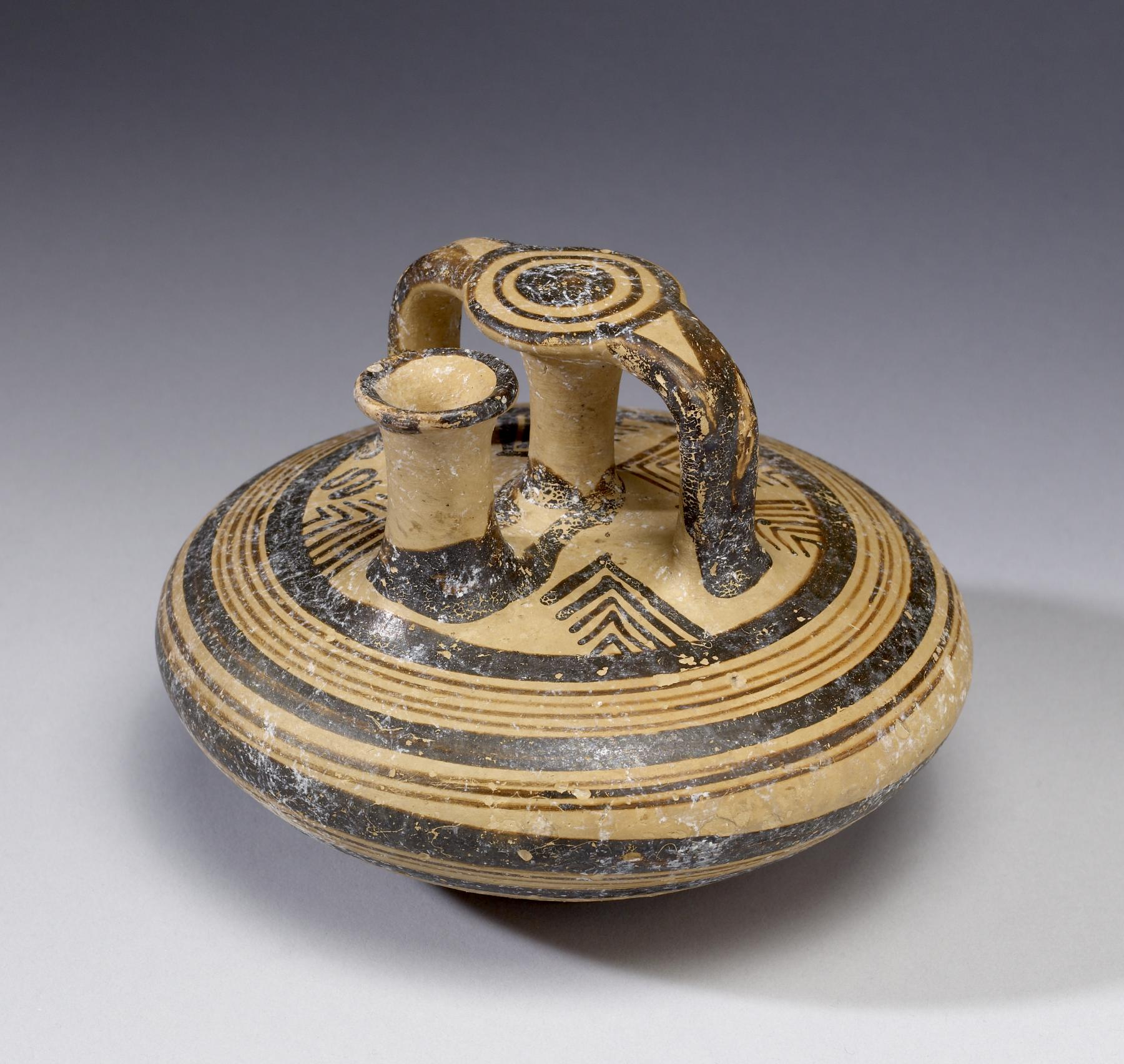
- Two examples of Mycenaean stirrup jars

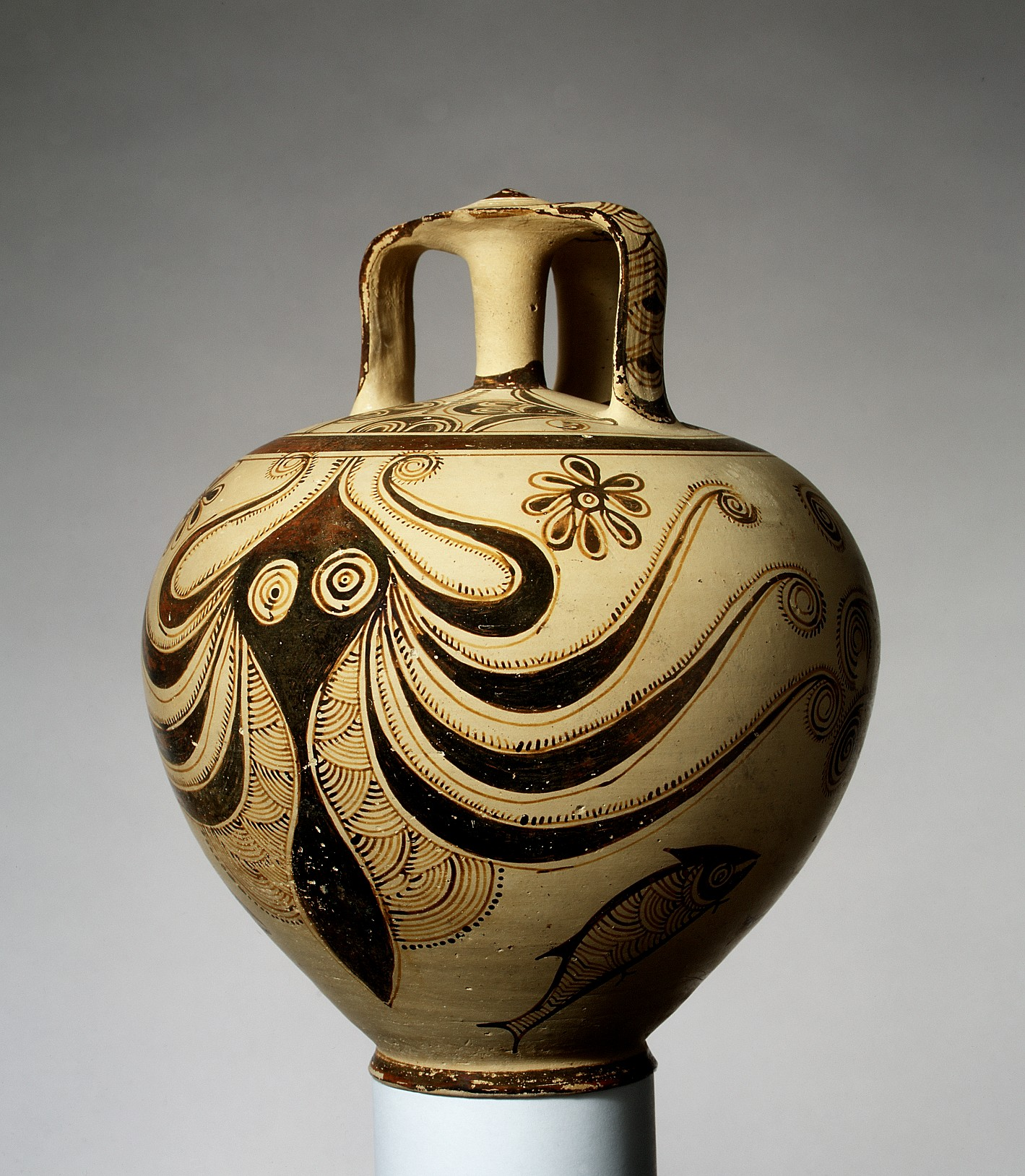
- Material: Ceramic
- Writing: About 10 instances of the LH/LM IIIB transport type have Linear B inscriptions.
- Created: Late Bronze Age, with an origin in the late Middle Bronze Age
- Discovered: Eastern Mediterranean, especially Crete and mainland Greece
- Discovered by: Schliemann.
- Classification: pouring vessel
- Culture: Mycenaean Greece, Minoan Crete

A stirrup jar is a type of pot associated with the culture of Mycenaean Greece. They have small squat bodies, a pouring spout, and a second nonfunctioning spout over which the handles connect like a stirrup. During the Late Bronze Age, they were used in the export of oils, and are found in large numbers at sites around the Eastern Mediterranean and beyond. The term "stirrup-jar" is a translation of German "Bügelkanne", the name assigned to them by Heinrich Schliemann who found the first instances during his excavations at Troy.

== Development ==
Despite its association with Mycenaean Greece, the stirrup jar has been argued to be a Minoan invention. H. W. Haskell, a theorist of the later 20th century, proposed that it originated in the Middle Bronze Age as a one-time invention intended to reduce wasteful pouring of expensive fluids. While earlier pouring vessels needed to be turned nearly upside down, pouring from a stirrup jar requires merely holding it by its stirrups and tilting it. Haskell's view was based on MM III jars found at Kommos (Crete) and Kea (island). From there it passed to the Cyclades, and only later to mainland Greece. Mycenaean stirrup jars were highly standardized, but Minoan and Cycladic examples vary greatly.

== Artistic features ==
Stirrup jars were decorated in a variety of designs. The stirrup jar offers two basic zones for decoration, the body and the shoulder. These are defined by concentric bands of color around the bottom and the top of the vase. The bands are present on nearly every stirrup jar, whether the canvases are painted or not. Sometimes the bands cover the entire body, and are the only decoration. These designs were achieved by applying slip while the pot was leather-hard or also after partial firing. After the final firing, the design became an integral part of the indurated surface.

== Archaeological context ==
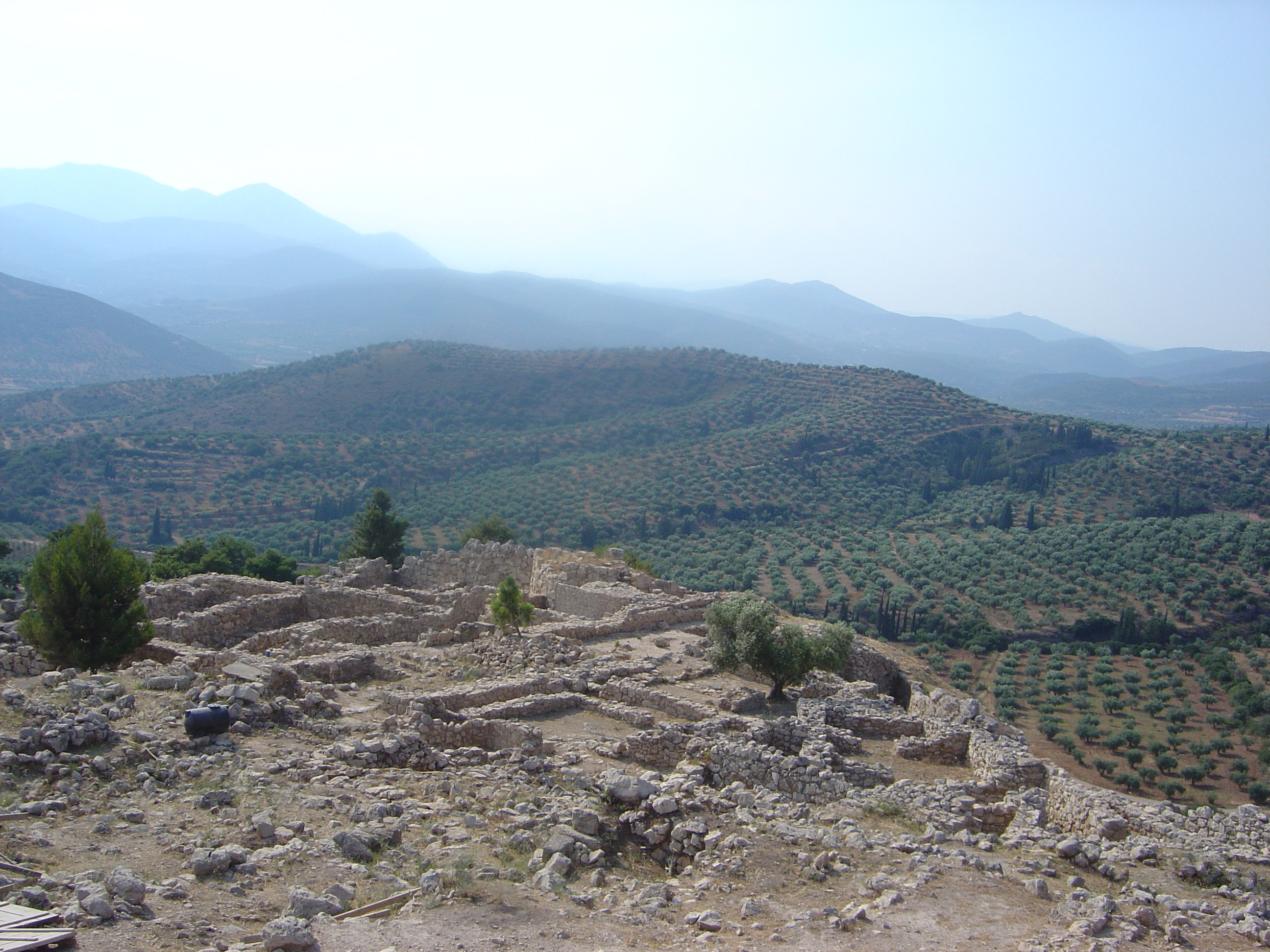
Houses in Mycenae. Note the extensive plantation of olive in the background.

Stirrup jars have been found at archaeological sites throughout the Eastern Mediterranean region, including those in mainland Greece, the Cyclades, Crete, Cyprus, Rhodes, Asia Minor, and Ancient Egypt. In short, the type is primarily associated with, and is a diagnostic of, Mycenaean Greece. It is known from the entire Mycenaean Period from Early Mycenaean (Late Helladic and Cycladic I and II) through all phases of the Late Mycenaean (Late Helladic, Cycladic, and Minoan III).

Evidence from Linear B documents indicates that stirrup jars were used as containers for olive oil. Speculations as to other contents have been made, but are generally unsupported. The most common, wine, had its own battery of containers from serving and drinking ware (cups, mixers, bowls, etc.) to transport vessels, the amphorae, which are generally larger and more plentiful than stirrup-jars. Wine was apparently more plentiful. Oil requires a significant investment in olive trees, which cannot be harvested for several years after planting. A third suggestion, perfume, is not compatible with the small quantities placed in perfume jars, which are always very small. The relatively large stirrup jars would represent unrealistically huge amounts of perfume.

Noting that the stirrup jars of which he knew from the excavated houses of Mycenae and elsewhere had a capacity of 12–14 L, Ventris, decipherer of Linear B, hypothesized that one stirrup jar was designed to hold one liquid unit, which he took to be “the convenient figure” of 12 litres (3.2 US gal). Using a density of olive oil of 0.917 kg/L obtains a weight of about 11 kilograms (24 lb) for a full jar, to which must be added the weight of the jar. As this is not a convenient weight for decanting or table use, the jars that came to Ventris's attention were probably of the transport type; that is, intended for export. Furumark's FS 164 is between 40 centimetres (16 in) and 50 centimetres (20 in) high and between 27.5 centimetres (10.8 in) and 35 centimetres (14 in) maximum diameter. A full jar was probably not lifted by the stirrups alone, as this practice would risk a disaster. As for amphorae, one might suppose wooden racks and loading nets lifted by cranes.

=== Fine ware stirrup jars ===
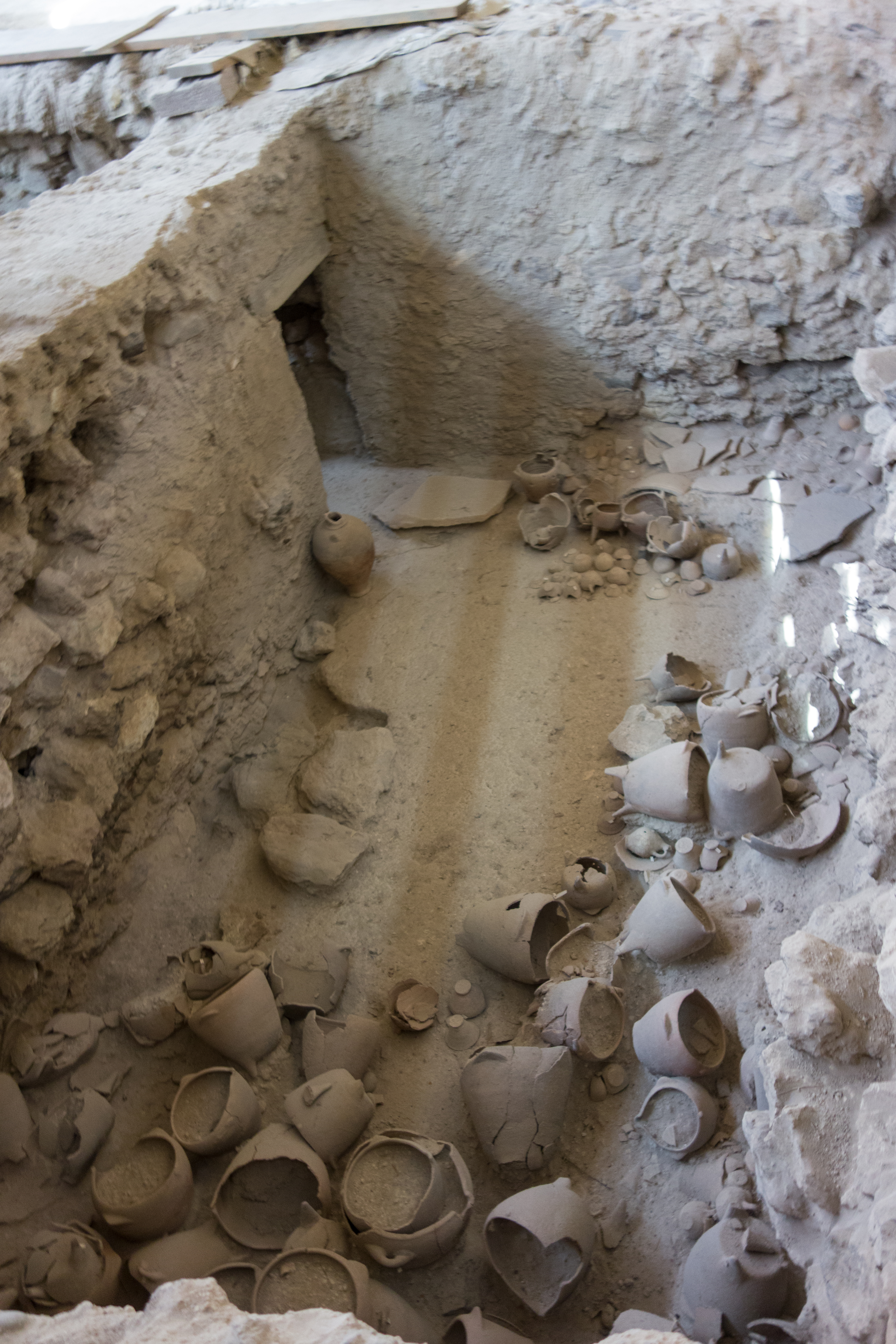
Storage pottery, Akrotiri

The early stirrup-jars were not distinguished by special type; i.e., the sizes and shapes varied within a maximum height of 45 centimetres (18 in). They were all from "domestic deposits," yet some had features suggesting export: instead of the two stirrup handles, a disk supported by three handles, and a true spout with two or three horns (we should say lugs) on its sides. The lugs could be for lashing down a cloth (Homeric kredemnon) over a stopper (no stoppers have been found). The disk had one or two holes on the edge, possibly for ties holding a stopper or a shipping tag. Haskell suggests an identity tag marking the owner.

By LM I B, the smaller Cretan jars had developed into one of the two subsequent major types, the "fine ware", which Haskell proposes spread to the rest of the eastern Mediterranean: LH I B, LC I A, etc., and the equivalent periods on Cyprus and Rhodes. Those cultures were predominantly Mycenaean. Before then, while Knossos was still under the Linear A administration, the stirrup jar moves into the Cyclades and is found at Akrotiri before the volcanic eruption. The smaller and finer instances were found in the living spaces. The storerooms contained larger and coarser stirrup jars. Haskell hypothesizes that the smaller were used for decanting from pithoi and for temporary storage.

What makes a stirrup jar "fine" is the grain size of the clay. Powdered clay results in a smooth surface. "Coarse ware", or coarse texture, means a surface similar to that of oatmeal, composed of larger grains, formed by admixture with quartz (sand) and particles of other minerals.

=== Transport stirrup jars ===
Haskell developed his idea of the larger, coarser type of stirrup jar found in storerooms at Akrotiri into the "transport stirrup jar", a vessel serving as a standard container for the export of olive oil, and perhaps other valuable fluids as well. The neutron activation analysis performed by the British Museum sparked a field-wide interest in the topic and the method. A number of research groups were to assume the challenge of refining the technique and applying it to other caches of stirrup jars to more fully ascertain its provenance and uses in trade. A challenge had been thrown down earlier questioning the validity of some of Evans' excavation at Knossos and his date for the invasion of Knossos by Mycenaeans, based on a supposed late date of the stirrup jar (see below under issues).

==== The Kommos sherds ====
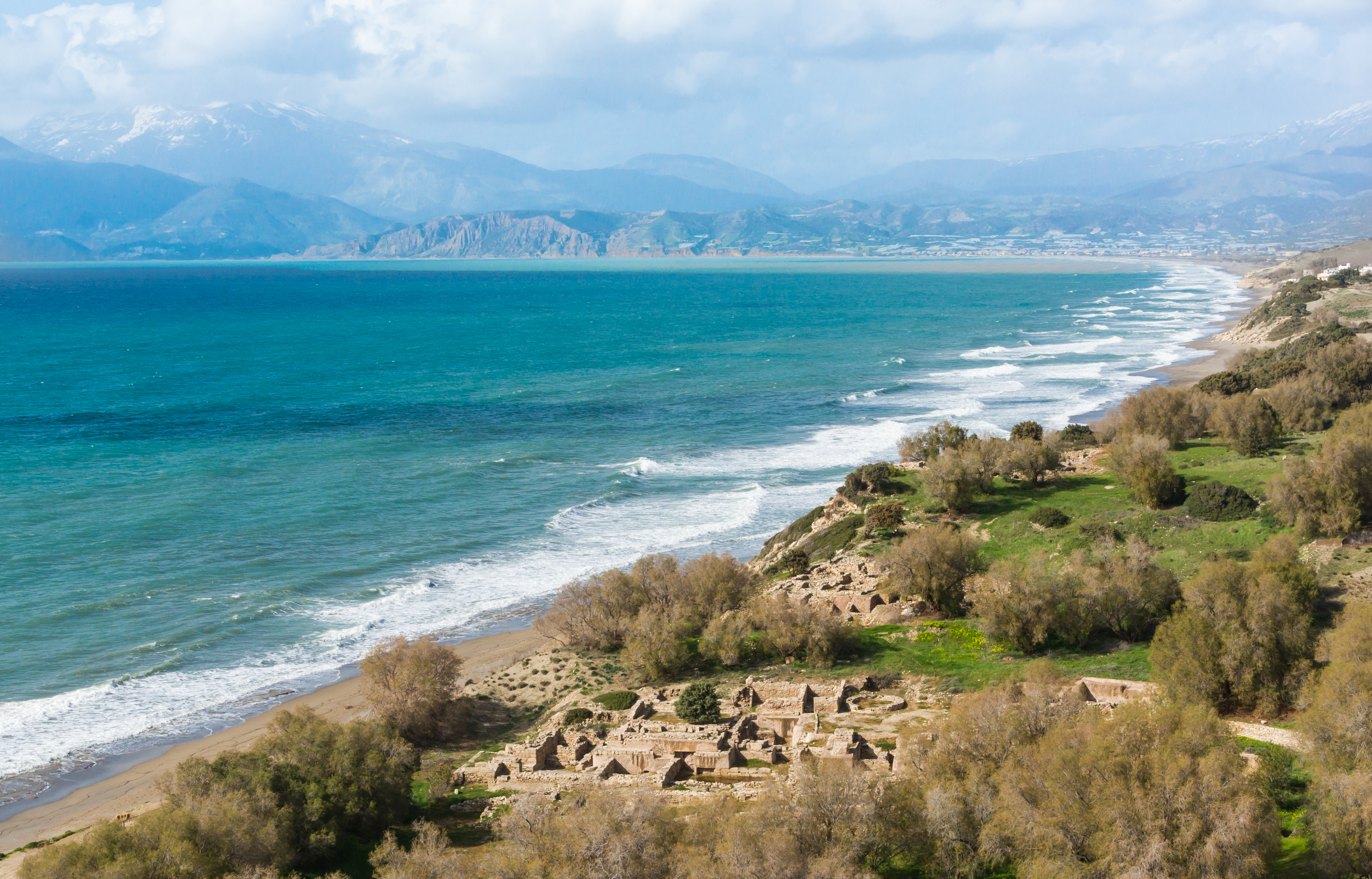
The archaeological site, and the bay of Kommos, the ancient harbor of Phaïstos, Crete, Greece.

Contemporaneously with Haskell's theoretical work and the British Museum's neutron activation studies, excavations were being conducted at Kommos on the southern coast of Crete by the University of Toronto, 15 years of excavation in all, ending in 1995, which turned up thousands pieces of what looked like export and import pottery. The excavators and theorists of this effort adopted Haskell's term of "transport jars". Kommos was an LBA (Late Bronze Age) port networking extensively with Egypt and the Levant.

Following the lead of the British Museum, the project archaeologists decided it would be illuminating to the subject of trade contacts and relationships to conduct neutron activation studies of the origin of this pottery. Accordingly, they prepared powdered samples of 18 stirrup jars, 13 short-necked amphorae, 34 Canaanite jars, 19 Egyptian jars, and 4 others subsequently reclassified, 88 in all, covering the span LM I B through LM III B. The stirrup jars covered LM II through LM III B. The goal was to test non-random geographical hypotheses about the compositional profiles of the samples; that is, the provenances, as had the British Museum.

The actual grouping by composition was done in advance by thin-section petrography, in which microscopically thin sections of the sample are mounted on a slide for visual inspection under a microscope. The grains of the fabric can then be identified mineralogically and the sample classified according to the types of minerals found. The study found 26 fabrics concerning which hypotheses could be tested by neutron activation and analysis of variance; that is, for each group, were the samples in it randomly or not? The cross-identification between fabric type and geologic region was assigned by inspection. The cross-identification between region and elemental profile was an outcome of the methods chosen for statistical manipulation of the profiles. These are beyond the scope of this article, but the theory is as follows.

Imagine an ideal clay bed in which the same elements are found at the same concentrations in every sample at random. In a sufficient number of samples, the measured concentrations are expected to vary at random (defined mathematically) around a mean. If any do not, then the sample comes from a bed containing higher amounts. By comparing every element to a control element, presumed ideal; that is, at measured concentrations varying only at random, the investigators developed one or more profiles that were non-random.

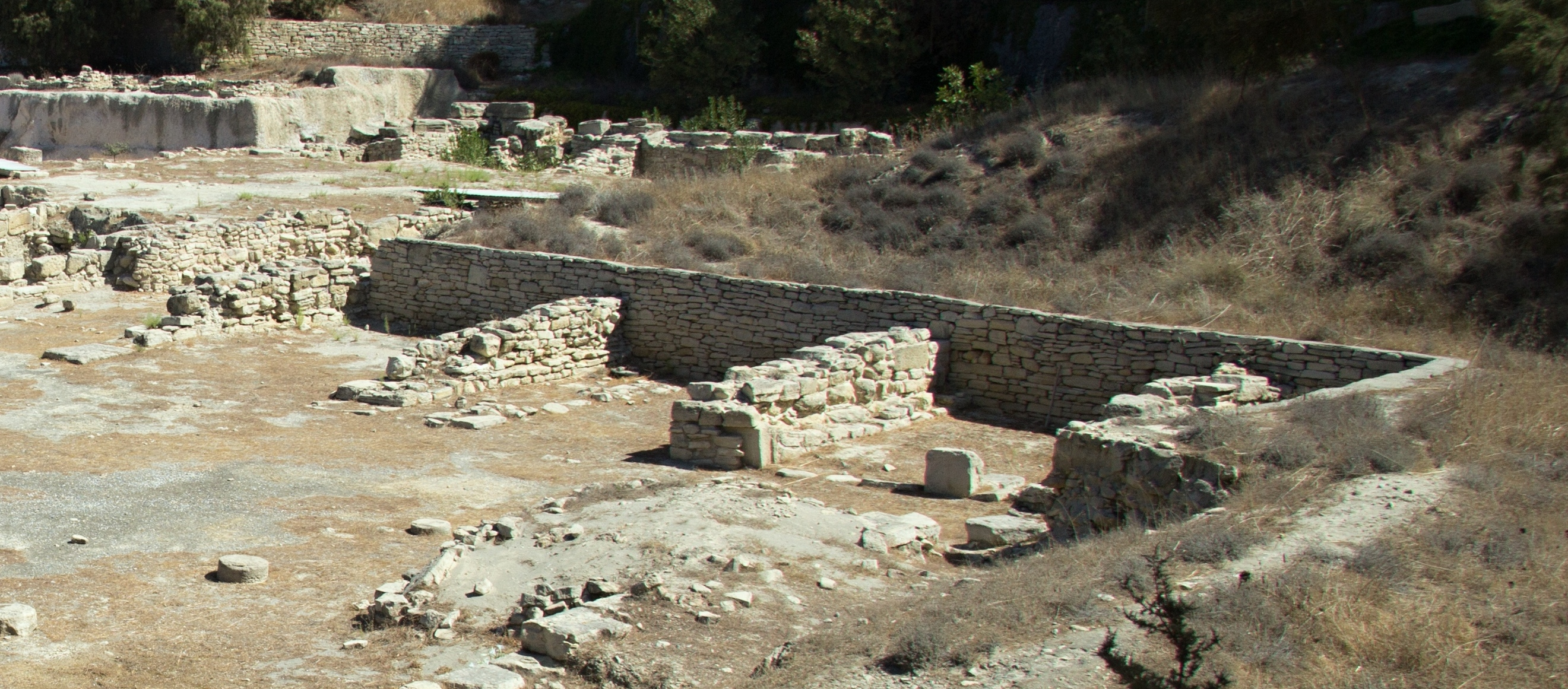
Location of the kiln at Kommos, placed in a previous central courtyard in the abandoned "south stoa of ashlar building T". The line of the stoa is marked by column bases. The kiln is under the subsequently excavated mound to the right. The bins formed from the ruined walls of T, looking like the bins of a modern stone yard, were used to store clay.

The first problem was to find a control element that was always present in the same concentration, varying only randomly. The investigators selected 27 elements for study, which might be presumed to be in every clay bed. Only 16 of these were chosen for statistical analysis, as the most reliable and representative. As a control, or ideal, element, the investigators chose Scandium, a low-presence element that had the second-lowest variability. The variation of each element in all the samples was calculated and compared to that of Scandium. If it exceeded that of Scandium by a specific threshold, then the element was judged present in some sample in a non-random amount. Further analysis pin-pointed which samples. The end result was a series of nine elemental profiles, each representing a bed of unique chemical composition. They were termed “Cretan chemical groups” I through IX.

There was obviously not a one-to-one match with the 26 fabrics. The investigators chose the multi-fabric solution: more than one fabric might belong to the same chemical group. The fabrics could then be grouped by chemical similarity in a dendrogram (which had no implications of descent). Some of the conclusions they drew are:

- The nine types are divided into Cretan (I–III) and import (IV–IX). All the Egyptian and Canaanite jars except two are from beds along the Nile or on the coastal plains of Lebanon, Syria, and Israel. The two are apparently imitations of Canaanite jars in Cretan clay. None of the stirrup jars or short-necked amphorae are imports.
- Native Cretan types I-III are all in or adjacent to the Messara Plain in south central Crete. They are of different clay than that around Kommos; i.e., the clay (or possibly the pots) was brought to Kommos, probably from select beds. It was fired in the kiln at Kommos. Type I consists of marine sediments. Type II with a higher concentration of Chromium reflects outcroppings of high-Chromium rock in the plain. Type III comes from volcanic rock in the foothills of the Asterousia Mountains of south coastal Crete. I contains mainly Fabric A ("main south-central Cretan"), with smaller amounts of D, E, G, and J; II is A also, and III is B.
- Of the stirrup jars, 10 are A and I, ranging in date from LM II to LM III B. The locality cannot be determined any more precisely than western Messara Plain. Since the kiln at Kommos included bins for storage of unworked clay, pottery fired there was probably worked at that location also. The ruins of the fine palace would now have taken on a messy industrial appearance, with thousands of pots in every stage of development.

These conclusions about the stirrup jars at Kommos follow the same direction as the earlier British Museum studies. Throughout the 14th/13th centuries BC the jars were made from local clays. If there was any connection to Knossos and north Crete there is little hint of it here. There is nothing to suggest that the pot-making was an aspect of an overall palace economy (the deficit does not imply there was none). Kommos was a terminal point for imports from Egypt and the Levant. There was possibly a local balance of trade against exports from Kommos, as the transport jars, not being imports, can only have been intended for export.

== Issues of the stirrup jar ==
The stirrup jar has been a key topic in the scholarship of the LBA, perhaps because of its specialized nature. Beginning before the LBA, and ending after, it has endured through some major changes in civilization. Change of language is generally considered to be a major cultural change. When the stirrup jar began on Crete, its administrative citizens used a syllabary termed by Evans Linear A, reflecting a yet unknown language, probably not Indo-European, sometimes called "Aegean". At some point in the LBA Linear A was replaced by Linear B, another syllabary representing east Greek. One of the major issues regarding this change is when it occurred, a second being how.

At some point later, east Greek stopped being spoken in the Peloponnesus and on Crete, while writing disappeared in Greece. When history began to be written in a new alphabet centuries later, verbal tradition covering the gap was telling of an invasion of illiterate west Greek speakers from central Greece, a destruction of Mycenaean civilization, and a replacement or subjugation of the East Greeks in the Peloponnesus. A new population on the coast of Anatolia told of being driven across the Aegean by invaders. Issues of this second cultural change are when and how this replacement occurred.

To some the dark age seemed to wipe the slate of Greek culture clean. All the old ways and artifacts seemed to have disappeared or to have been highly modified. The stories of political events during those times were discounted as unreliably legendary, having no primary record. The art seemed to have begun anew. The change seems somewhat unusual, as large populations of east Greeks, such as the city of Athens, were little touched by the change and should have left some continuous record. The darkness and discontinuity of the dark age began to be questioned, which is a third type of issue.

== List of stirrup-jar sites ==
=== Crete ===
- A number of inscribed Kydonian stirrup jars have been recovered from several archaeological sites on Crete.

=== Rhodes ===
- Early examples of the stirrup jar have been recovered from Rhodes dating to c. 1200 BC.

=== Mycenae ===
- From the Panagia Houses I and II, twelve LH III B globular, decorated stirrup jars of two sizes, a smaller, fine-ware, and an intermediate-size of variable grain texture.

== Gallery ==
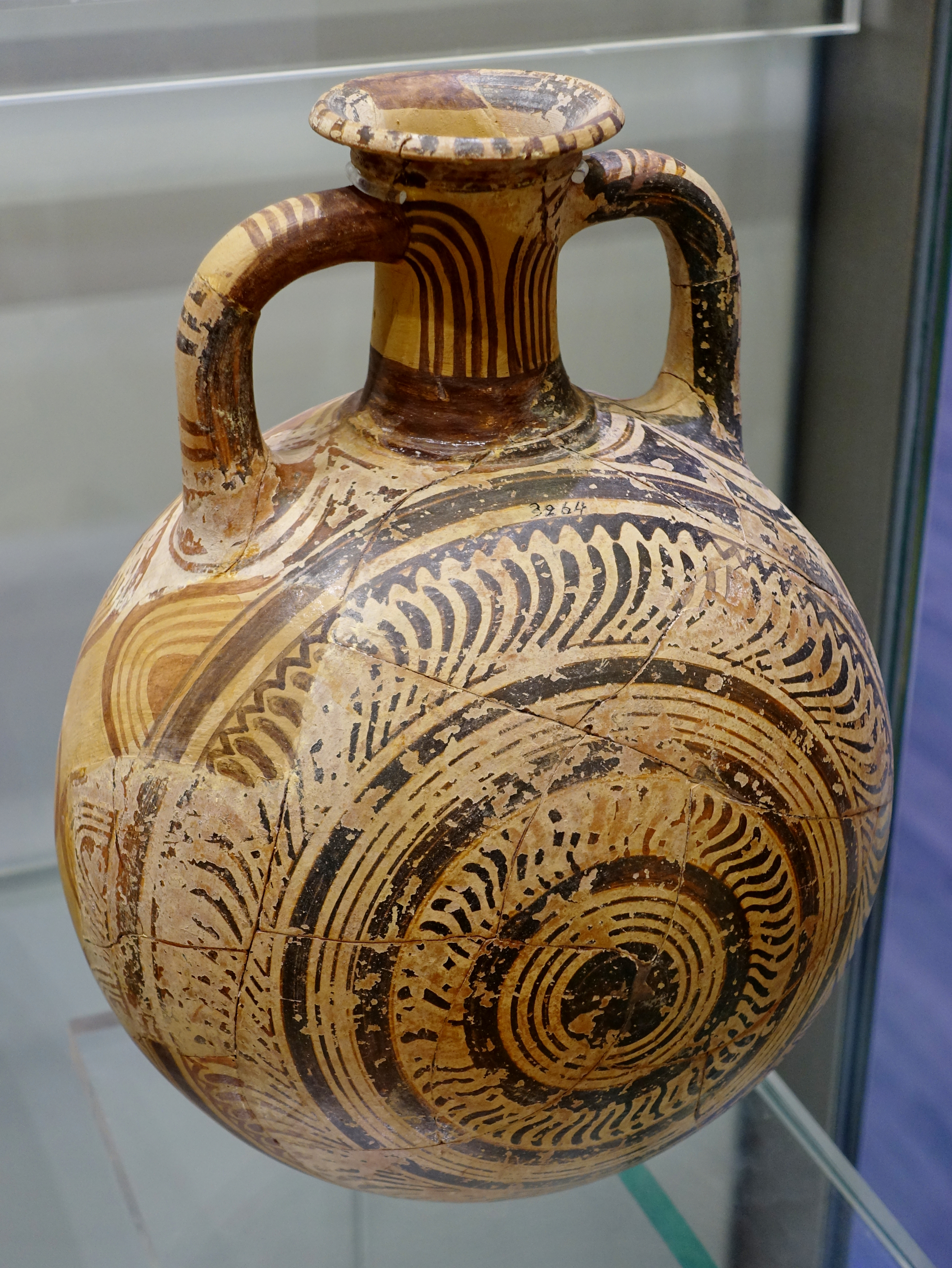
A stirrup flask from Roussolakkos, Crete, 1370 - 1200 BC (Date by the Archaeological Museum of Iraklion). The stirrup handles are present, but the spout is a true one, necessitating total inversion of the flask.

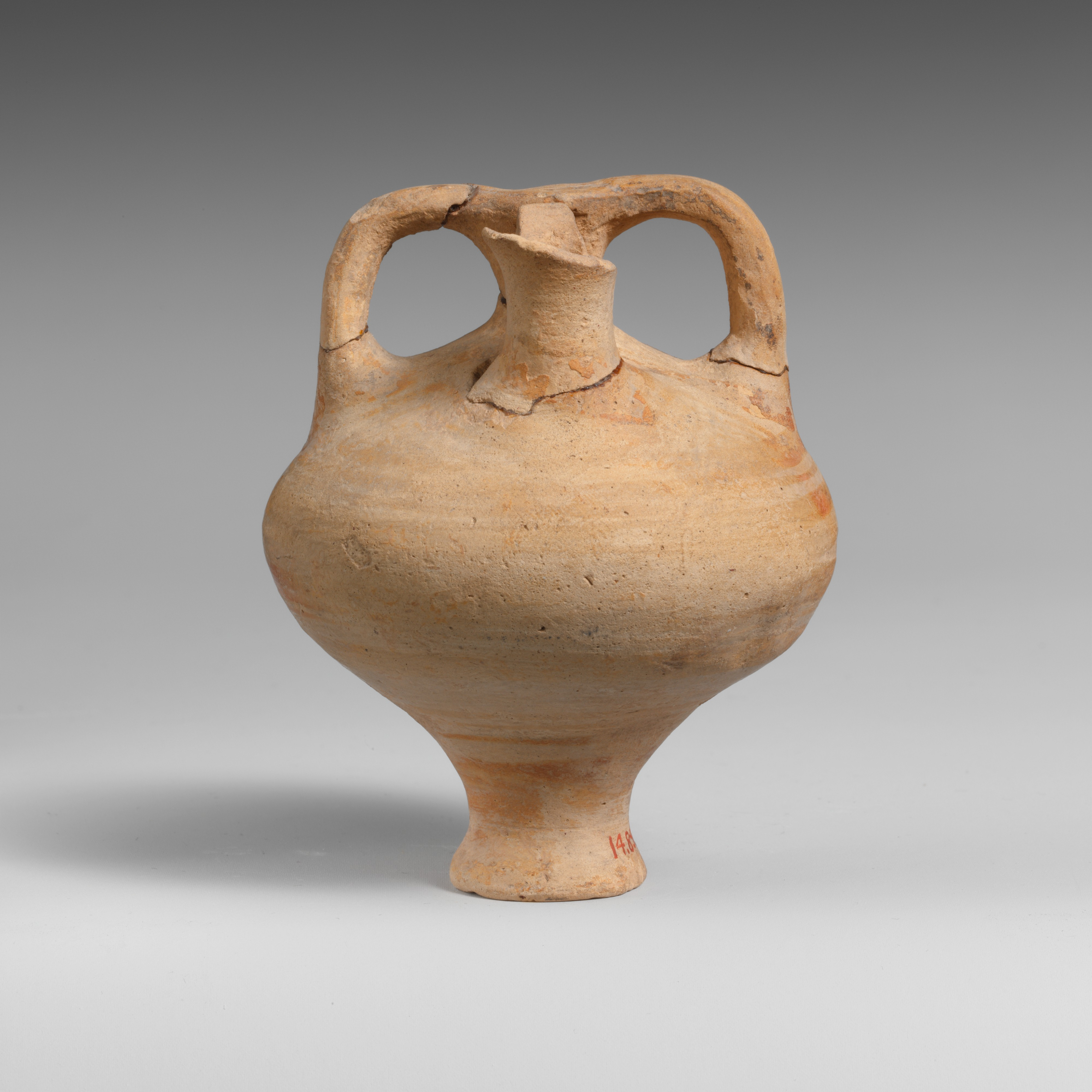
Transport Minoan stirrup-jar, LM III A ca. 1400 BC (The Met's date)

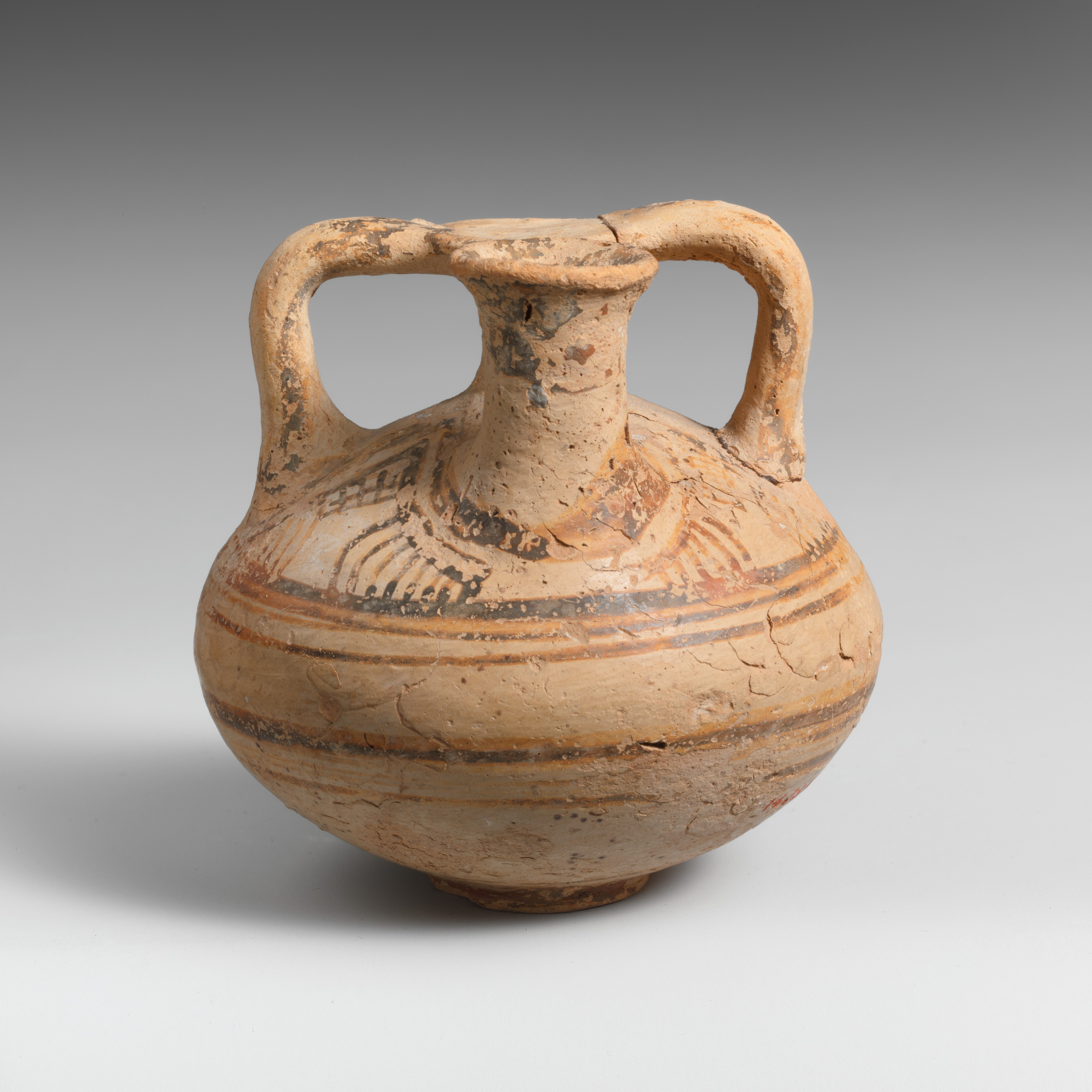
Fine-ware Minoan stirrup-jar, LM III B ca. 1300 BC (The Met's date)

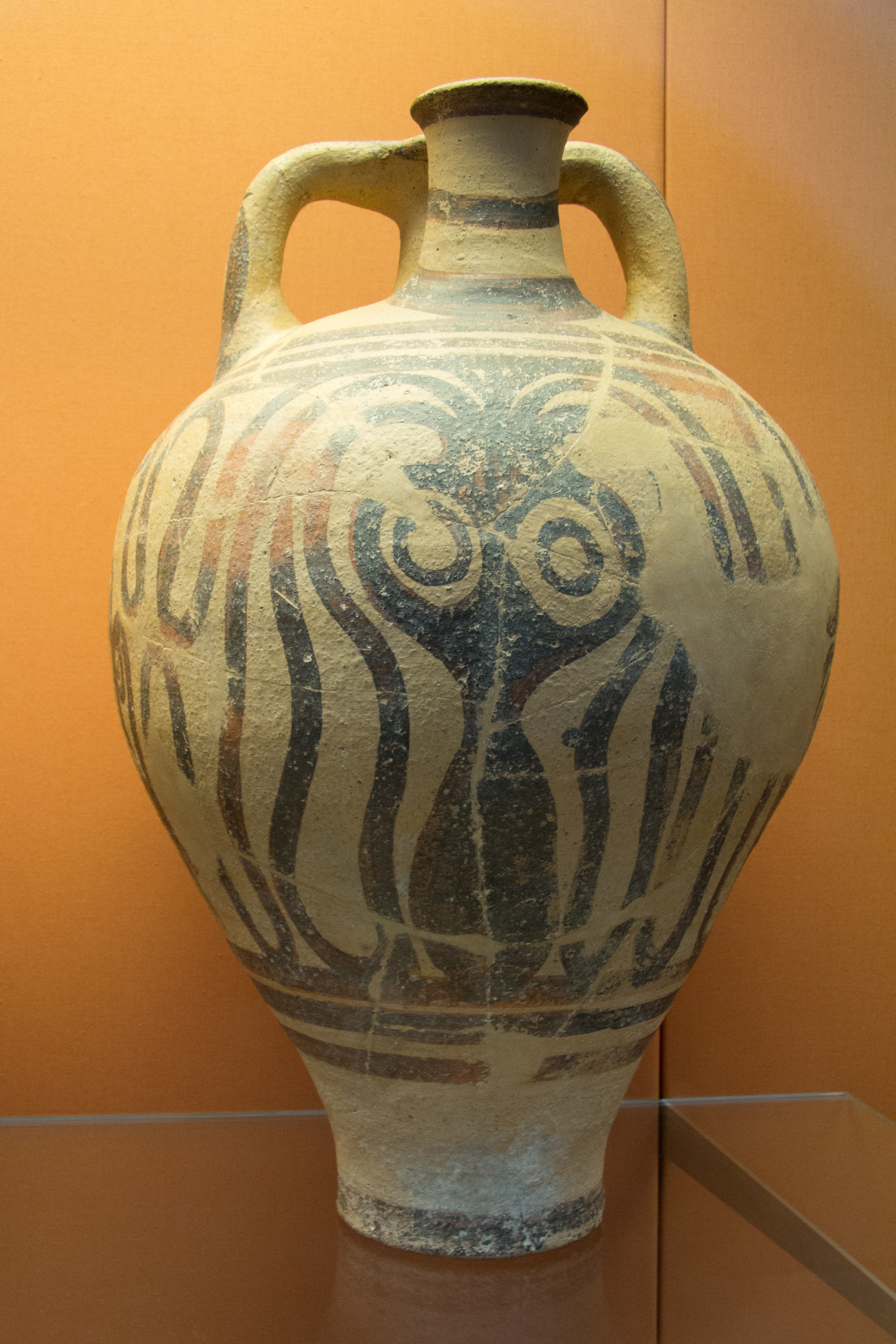
Transport Minoan stirrup jar, LM III B ca. 1300-1200 BC (British Museum date). From Tomb 50, Kourion, Cyprus.

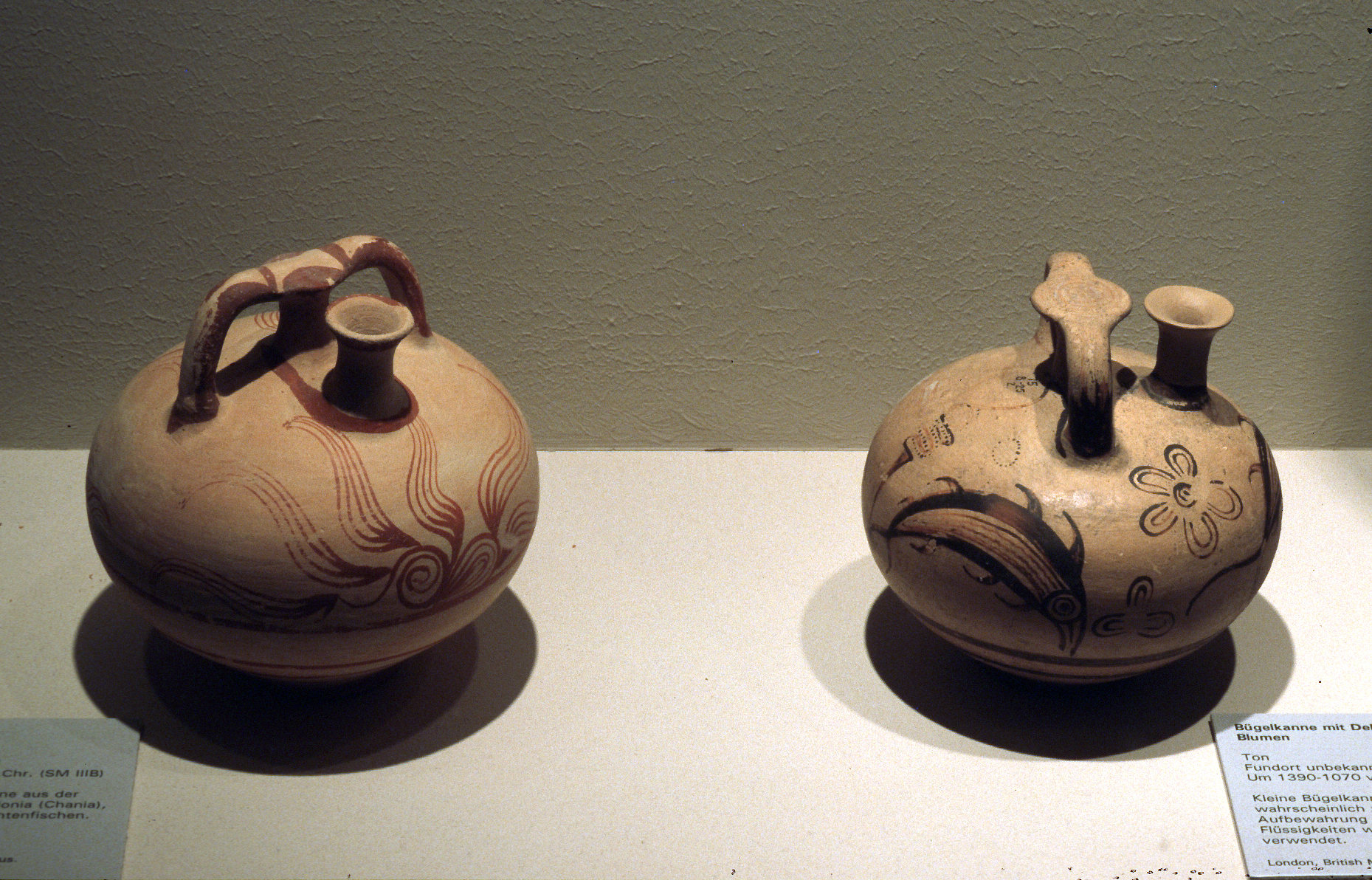
Fine-ware Minoan stirrup jar, LM III ca. 1390 - 1070 BC (Museum display dates)

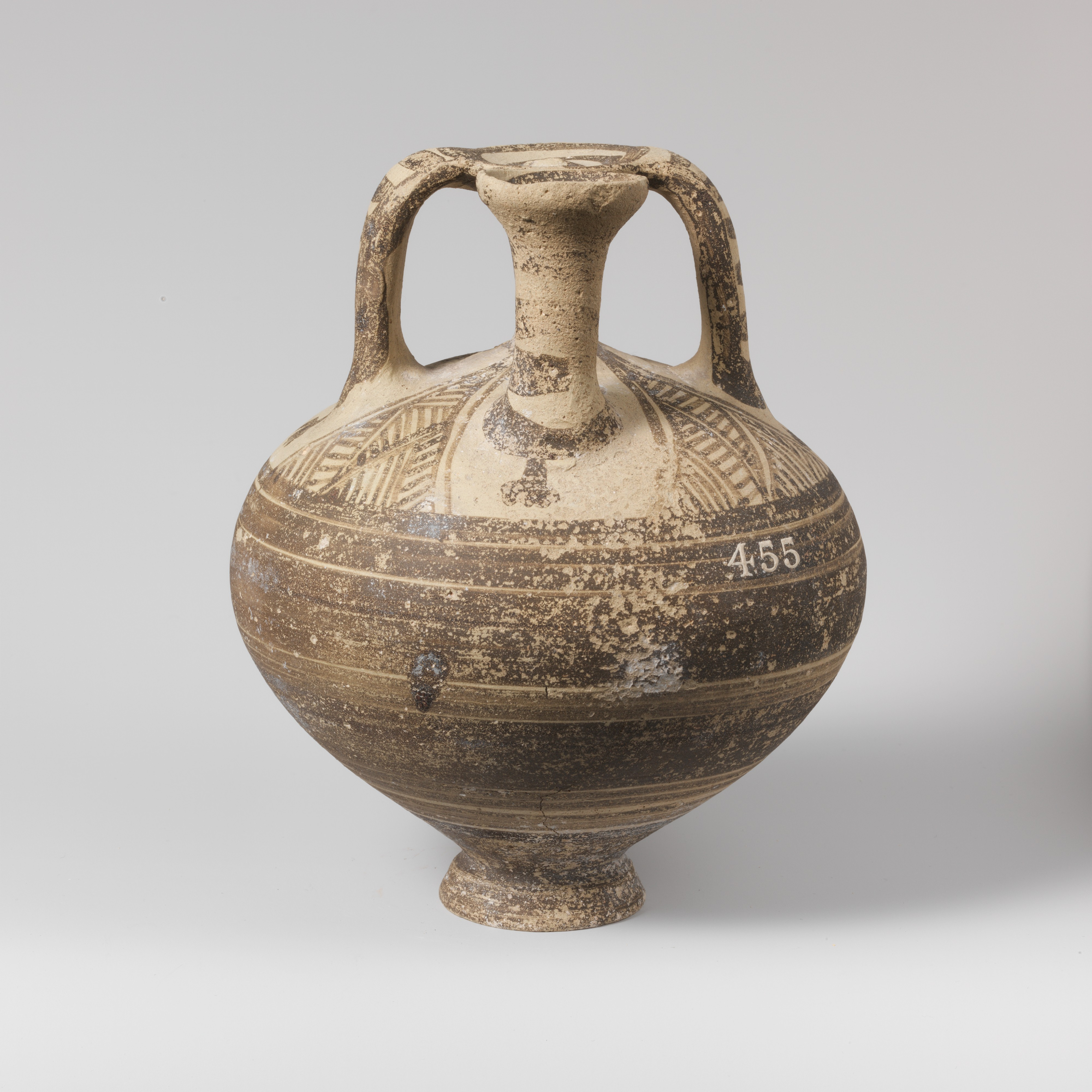
Cypriot stirrup jar, Late Cypriot III B ca. 11th century BC (The Met's date)

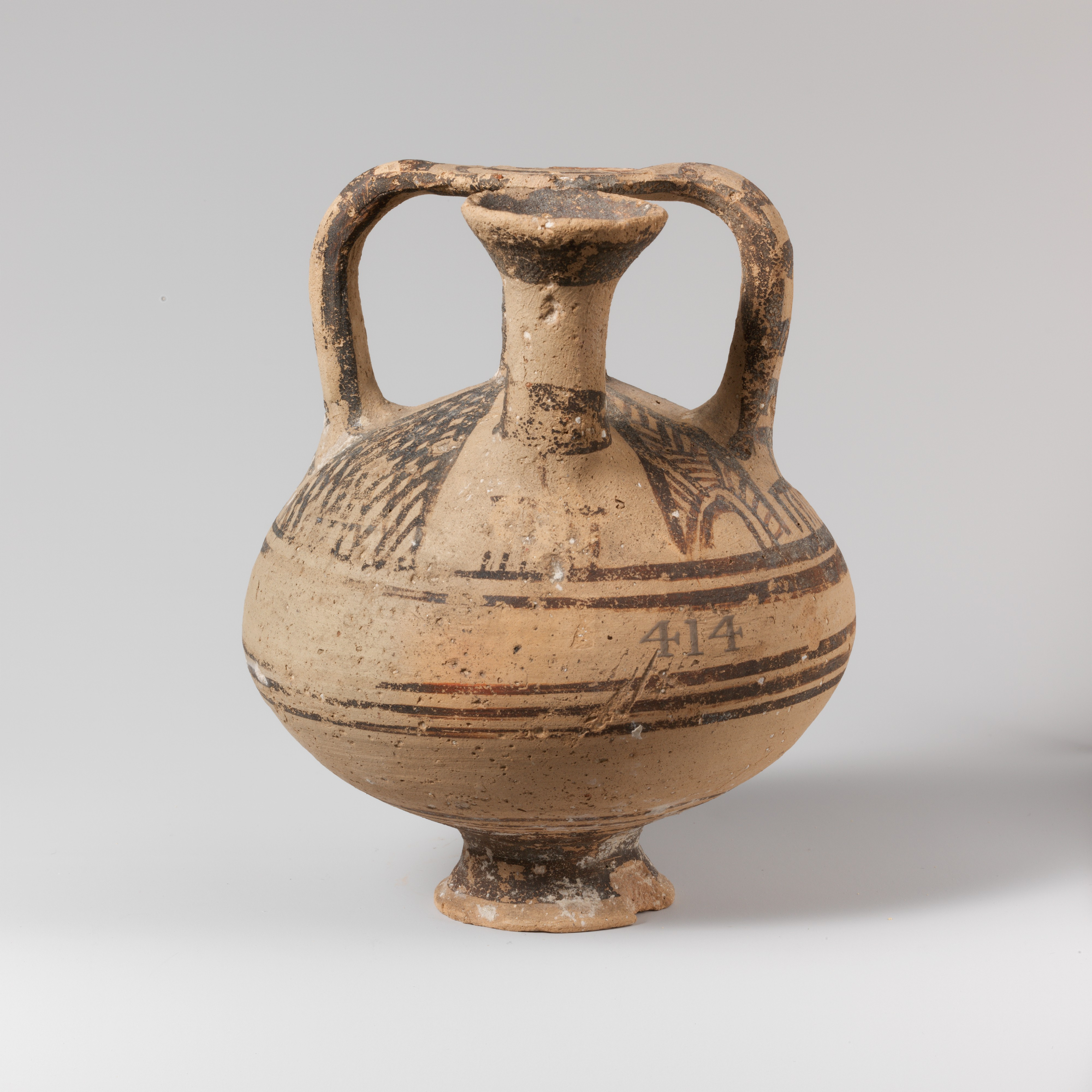
Cypriot stirrup jar, Late Cypriot III ca. 11th century BC (The Met's date)

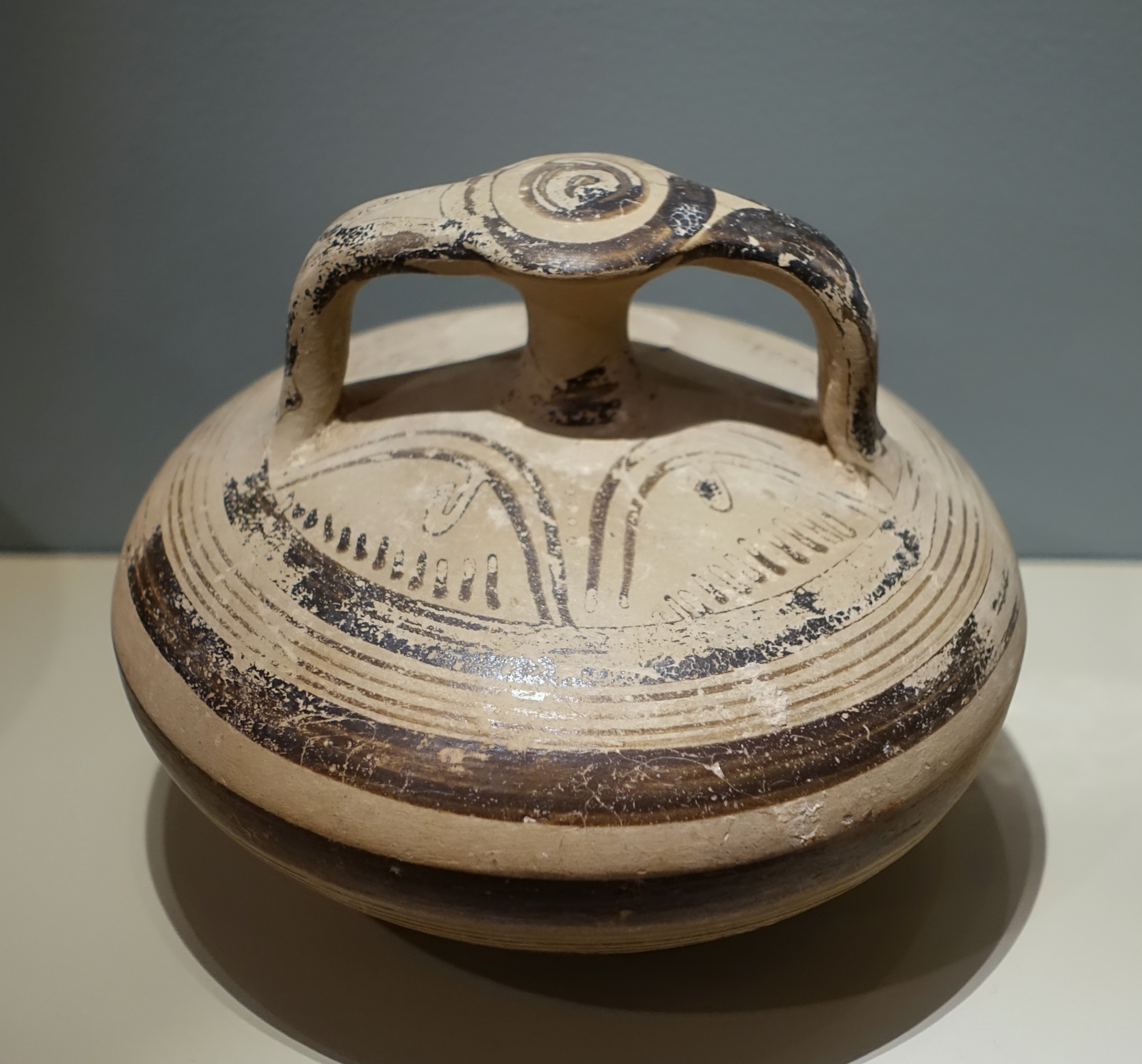
Cypriot stirrup jar, Late Cypriot III ca. 1200 - 1100 (Middlebury College's date)

== Science and the stirrup-jar ==
Stirrup jars are made of clay, which in unworked form occurs in beds of particles of a certain size formed from the weathering of rock. As different rocks are composed of different minerals, clay has also a certain range of compositions, all of which contain clay minerals and sand, which is weathered quartz. Mixed with water the particles of clay cohere in a plastic mass of loosely bonded grains. When fired, or baked in an oven, the grains indurate, or form chemical bonds between them, so that they can no longer slide over each other. Pottery is therefore constructed and shaped in the plastic phase and then placed in an oven of predetermined temperatures to cook for predetermined lengths of time. The ancients were aware of these factors and did vary temperature and time although not with today's precision. In the vocabulary of pottery, clay pots are considered earthenware ceramics and are typically labelled terracotta, etymologically "baked earth".

In the last few decades of the 20th century a number of questions became current about the provenance of Mycenaean pottery excavated by the British Museum from Tell es-Sa'idiyeh in the Jordan Valley. The pottery was Mycenaean, but was it imported or local? As a result, the British Museum's Department of Scientific Research (now Conservation and Research) decided to run a series of scientific tests on stirrup jars as representative pottery to see what determinations might be made, such as the provenance of the clay from which they were manufactured. They would perform the same tests on a "control group" of pots of known provenance in the British Museum.

=== Radiographic analysis ===
The preliminary tests determined the construction of the stirrup jars by xeroradiography, which had been adapted to archaeological images from medical technology. It produced x-ray images on paper rather than film. Like x-rays of metal castings, these images were of the masses within the border surfaces, showing cracks and inclusions. All the pots turned out to be constructed in the same way, without consideration of time or place.

First the body of the pot is constructed by one of a few methods: coils, slabs or the potter's wheel. Immediately after construction, the pot contains too much moisture to be fired, as its sudden loss would cause the pot to contract and crack. It is allowed to dry until shrinkage is complete and it reaches a state called in the trade leather-hard, a descriptive term. Subsequently, the body is pierced and the preformed spouts are luted (glued) in place. Etymologically the word means "mud". Lute is a slurry of clay and other substances the potter feels would enhance the binding. The false spout may be hollow, partly hollow, or solid. If hollow, it is blocked with ceramic. Finally, the stirrup handles are luted on.

Radiographic analysis revealed minor differences in construction: size and shape of the base, method of obtaining a base pot, size, shape and placement of the spouts and handles, etc. What the investigators wanted to know is whether any of these were statistically significant; i.e., were not the result of random variation, and therefore were the signature of some potter or school of potters. They decided to perform a quantitative analysis of each pot's elemental composition; that is, a list of elements with the percentage present. They would assume a presence of 23 elements and detect the amounts present, obtaining a profile for each pot. Software to perform an analysis of variance of the profiles of all the samples for various factors would then detect if any factor caused a non-random difference.

=== Neutron activation analysis ===
The tedious methods of qualitative analysis by chemical isolation of the components went out of general use with the invention of mass spectrometry in the early 20th century. Most generally, mass spectrometers turn the sample into a gas (destroying it) and by bombarding it with a stream of electrons create a plasma, or supercharged cloud of ions, which loses the energy imparted to it by radiating wavelengths characteristic of the elemental atoms at an intensity that depends on the concentration of the element. A detector sorts the radiation by wavelength and reads the atomic spectra. Software turns the raw spectra and concentrations into a report of element and concentration present in the sample. This method was less attractive to the investigators because of sample destruction.

A subsequent method activates only the nucleus rather than the whole atom. At the British Museum, a sample powder was obtained from each jar by drilling a 2 mm diameter hole in the footing with a tungsten carbide drill. The sample was sealed in a silica tube and sent off to a laboratory. There each sample was irradiated with a stream of neutrons. The nuclei acquired more neutrons than nature ordinarily permits, creating short-lived isotopes, which decayed emitting a radiation characteristic of the elemental atoms, etc. The sample is not destroyed, but can be used again.

Analysis of variance on the profiles of the sample jars found that minor variation of constructional features was random. On the other hand, there existed regional non-random profiles, which indicate regions of a single clay composition. The pots must have been manufactured there from them. A method had been found to identify at least by region the geological beds from which the clay had been retrieved.

=== Regions of stirrup-jar manufacture ===
The control sample regions were as follows.

- East Peloponnesus, represented by 5 jars from Mycenae and Berbati in the Argolid, LH III A2 and LH III B.
- Attica, represented by 4 jars, LH III C.
- Aegina, represented by one jar, LH III C.
- Rhodes, represented by 3 imports from East Peloponnesus, LH III A2 and LH III B, one from Attica, LH III B - C1, and 4 native to Ialysos, Rhodes, LH III C1.
- Crete, represented by 2 jars from Knossos, LM III B.
- Cyprus, represented by 4 imports from East Peloponnesus, LH III A2, LH III B, and 2 native Cypriote, 12th century BC.
- Caria, represented by 1 jar from Assarlik, LH III C.
- Egypt. None were manufactured, but there were 3 East Peloponnesian imports, LH III B.

In the test sample, there were

- three jars from Tell es-Sa'idiyes, 12th century BC, and one 13th-century jar from East Peloponnesus.

This is the first scientific data illuminating the difficult questions of who used the stirrup jars, when, who manufactured the stirrup jars, where, how they got from one place to another, and what conclusions might be drawn from their presence. Because the Jordanian stirrup jars were so late, the project confined itself to the relative time period, LH/LM III, long after the invention on Crete and introduction of the type to Greece. LH III included, however, the floruit of Mycenaean culture. Some hypotheses are evidently inconsistent, such as, stirrup jars were the monopoly of Crete and only arrived in Greece by importation from there, or that stirrup jars were moved from one area to another when they were carried there by Mycenaean Greeks.

Instead, several regions of competition are defined, not necessarily as a political bloc, but as regions where the jars were manufactured locally from local clays and sold with their contents on the open market both locally and for export. There are no political implications either imperial or any other, and no ethnic implications about the exporters or importers. Anyone in the region could make and ship the pottery freely. If it was made by a royal administration in a palace, it was nevertheless sold on the free market. The manufacturers, however, as indicated by the historical documents of Linear B, might not have been free men according to today's understanding, and might not have reaped the profits.

The authors do present some tentative further conclusions, dividing III into an earlier (A and B) and a later (C). In the earlier period, East Peloponnesian stirrup jars were exported to Egypt, Palestine, Rhodes, and Cyprus. In later III, Cyprus and Rhodes made their own jars, while East Peloponnesus contributed none, presumably because they did not make them any longer. The authors attribute this deficit to the destruction of the mainland palaces and the fall of Mycenaean culture there, to be replaced by Dorian. By then Jordan also was making its own Mycenaean pottery from local clays. The presence of Mycenaean pottery there is therefore not an indication that they were Mycenaean Greeks. The former Mycenaean Greeks were, so to speak, either on the defensive or on the run, faced with invasions from the Balkans.

== See also ==
- Amphora
- Bridge spouted vessel
- Late Bronze Age
- Minyan ware
- Mycenaean pottery
- Stirrup spout vessel, a similarly named South American vessel
- Sub-Mycenaean pottery

== General sources ==
- Chadwick, John (1974). Documents in Mycenaean Greek (Second ed.). Cambridge: University Press.
- Day, Peter M.; Quinn, Patrick S.; Rutter, Jeremy B.; Kilikoglou, Vassilis (2011). "A World of Goods: Transport Jars and Commodity Exchange at the Late Bronze Age Harbor of Kommos, Crete" (PDF). Hesperia. 80 (4): 511–558. doi:10.2972/hesperia.80.4.0511. S2CID 126507132.
- Haskell, Halford W. (1985). "The Origin of the Aegean Stirrup Jar and Its Earliest Evolution and Distribution (MB III-LBI)". American Journal of Archaeology. 89 (2): 221–229. doi:10.2307/504326. hdl:11214/225. JSTOR 504326. S2CID 193111490.
- Leonard, A.; Hughes, M.; Middleton, A. (1993). "The Making of Aegean Stirrup Jars: Technique, Tradition, and Trade" (PDF). The Annual of the British School at Athens. 88: 105–123. doi:10.1017/S0068245400015902. S2CID 140580296.
- Pratt, Catherine Elizabeth (2014). Critical Commodities: Tracing Greek Trade in Oil and Wine from the Late Bronze Age to the Archaic Period (PDF) (PhD). Los Angeles: UCLA.
