= Sub-Mycenaean pottery =

Style of ancient Greek pottery

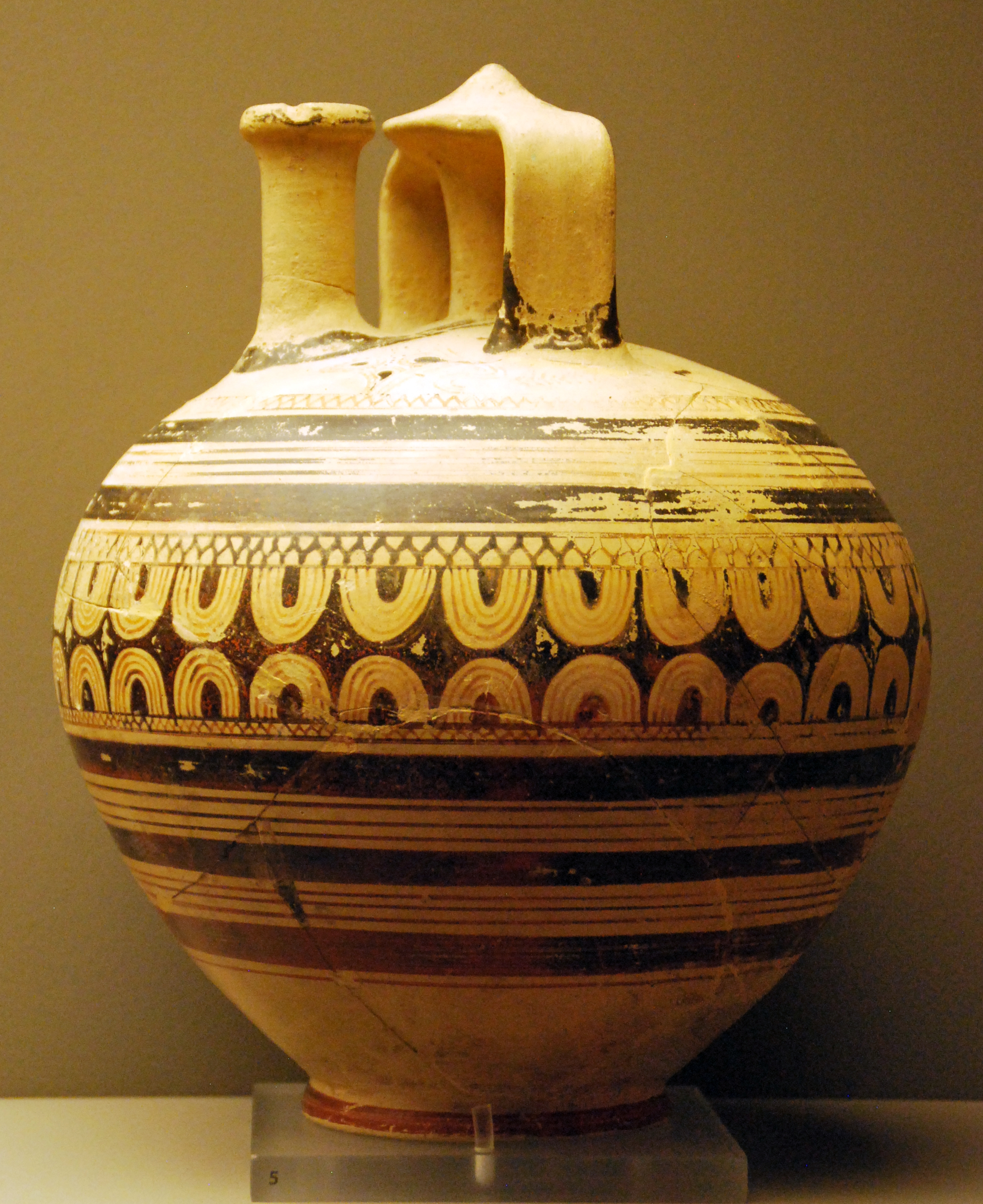
Late Mycenaean or Sub-Mycenaean small stirrup jar

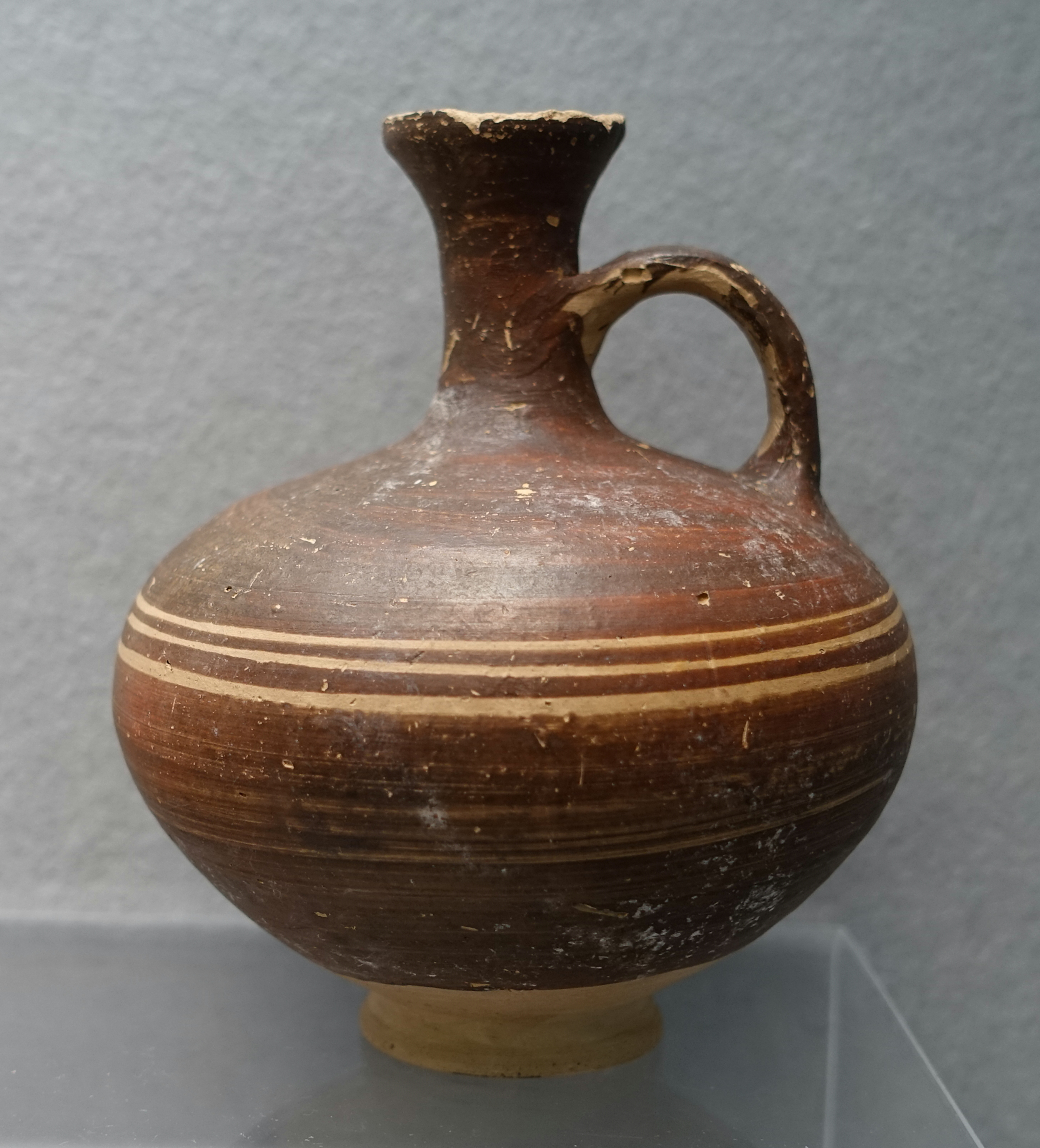
Lekythos in Protogeometric style, Submycenaean Greece, c. 1050 BC

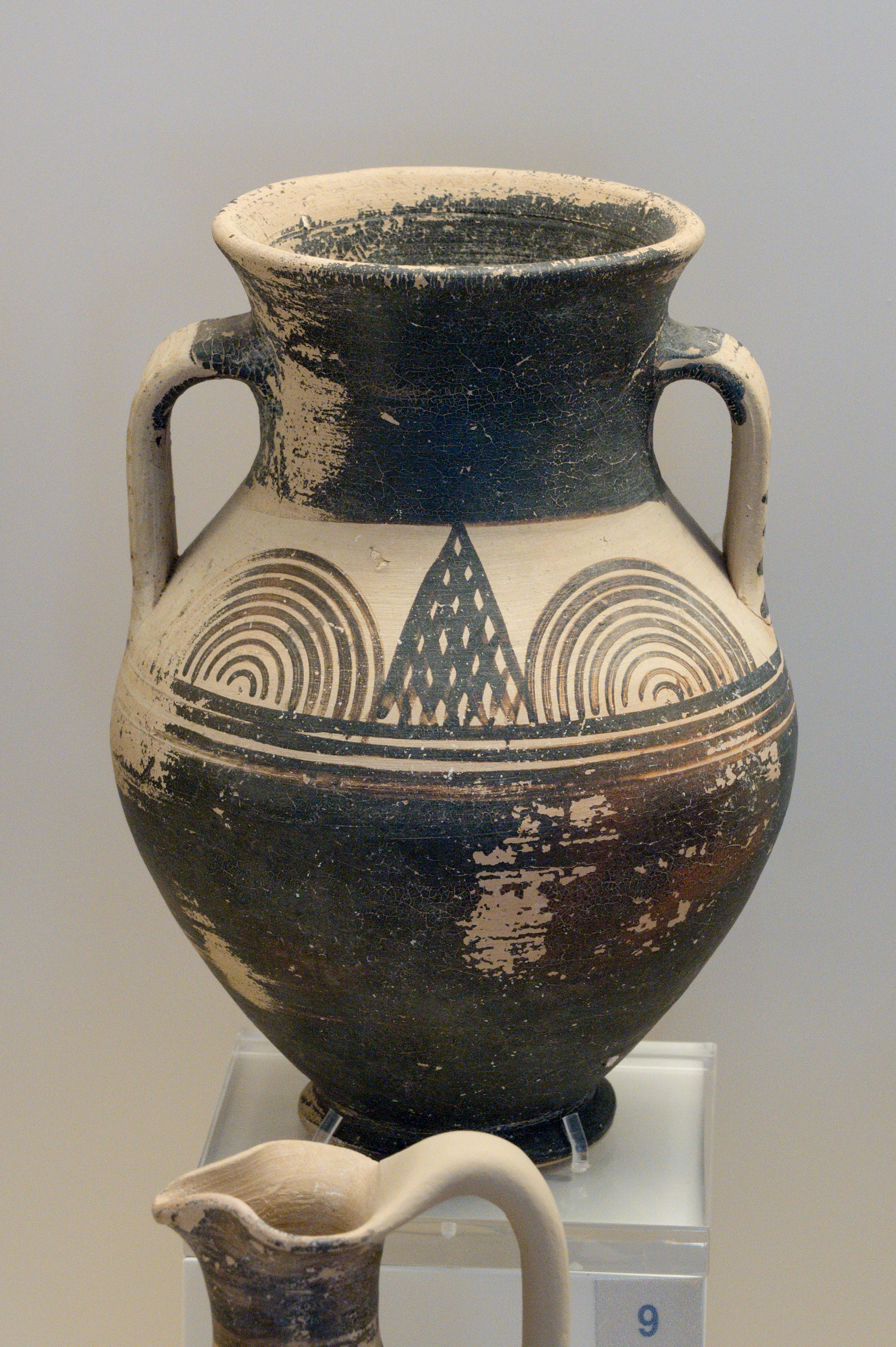
Amphoriskos, Tiryns, c. 1025–900 BC

Submycenaean pottery is a style of Ancient Greek pottery that is transitional between the preceding Mycenaean pottery and the subsequent styles of Greek vase painting, particularly the Protogeometric style. The vases from this period date between 1030 and 1000 BC.

== Discovery and Research ==
Submycenaean pottery is not extensively researched due to the limited number of discovered sites. The style was first identified in 1939 by Wilhelm Kraiker and Karl Kübler, based on finds from the Kerameikos and Pompeion cemeteries in Athens and Salamis. The existence of the style was initially disputed among archaeologists until later discoveries in Mycenae confirmed distinct Late Mycenaean and Submycenaean strata.

== Context and Distribution ==
Submycenaean pottery occurs primarily in contexts such as inhumations and stone-built cist graves. The distribution of finds suggests a settlement pattern consisting of hamlets and villages. In addition to Athens and Salamis, Submycenaean pottery has been discovered in Corinth, Asine, Kalapodi, Lefkandi, and Tiryns.

== Shapes and Decoration ==
The quality of Submycenaean vases varies widely. Only a few shapes were produced, including stirrup jars with a pierced shoulder, belly amphorae, neck amphorae, lekythoi, and jars, some with trefoil-shaped mouths. By the end of the Submycenaean period, the stirrup jar was replaced by the lekythos. The decoration on Submycenaean pottery is simple; motifs are limited to horizontal or vertical wavy lines, single or double hatched and overlapping triangles, and single or multiple concentric semicircles. Ornamental decoration is found on the shoulders of lekythoi, amphorae, and stirrup jars. Amphorae, amphoriskoi, and jugs typically feature one or several thick wavy lines. The overall style is less refined and carefully made compared to earlier pottery, leading one art historian to describe it as "rather unlovable".
