= John Lindros =

Swedish architect and photographer

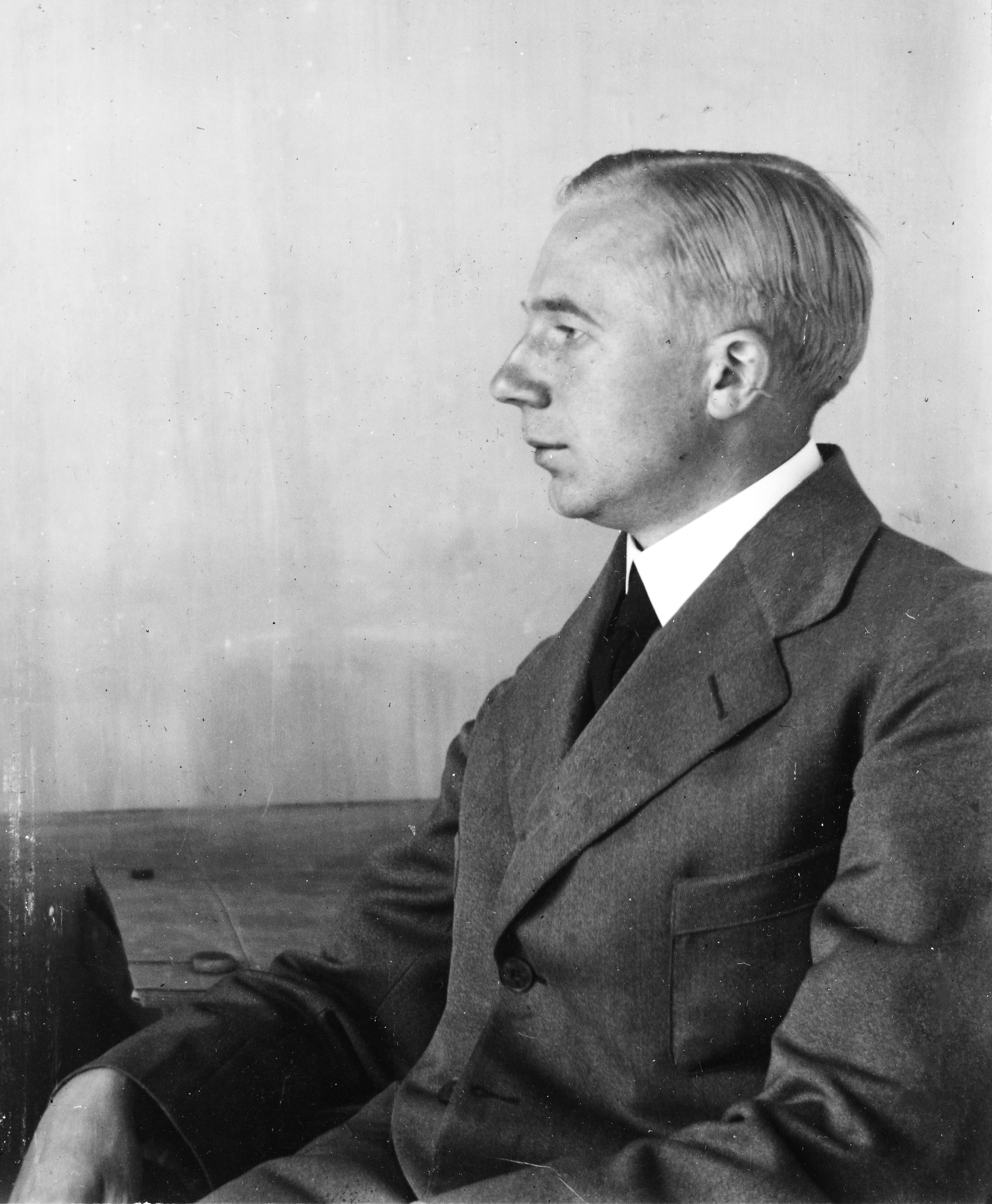
- Occupations: architect and photographer

John Lindros (August 3, 1898 – December 2, 1961) was a Swedish architect and photographer. He participated in the Swedish Cyprus Expedition.

== Biography ==
Lindros was born at Vaxholm, Sweden. During his studies at the Royal Institute of Technology in Stockholm (1923–1925), Lindros was employed by the Nordic Museum and Skansen to study buildings around Sweden. During later studies at Stockholm University he metAlfred Westholm, who recruited him to join the Swedish Cyprus Expedition under the direction of archaeologist Einar Gjerstad.

During the expedition the Swedish Cyprus Expedition (1927–1931), Lindros worked as architect, responsible for measuring and drawing the many maps, plans and sections that are the result of an archaeological excavation. He also worked as a photographer and took an enormous amount of pictures of the excavations. He photographed when SF Studios produced a newsreel about the Swedish Cyprus expedition. As Alfred Westholm had experience in photographic and topographic work, Lindros worked mostly in Erik Sjöqvist's excavation team. When Sjöqvist was ill, Lindros temporarily took over the excavation in Idalion, Cyprus. He was also interested in documenting Cypriot folklore and visited many remote villages with his camera. John's wife Rosa Lindros followed him to Cyprus and stayed there until June 1928. She also participated in restoration of the archeological findings.

Along with expedition leader Einar Gjerstad, John Lindros was responsible for unpacking the archaeological materials after returning to Sweden. He worked with the other expedition members on the major scientific publication, The Swedish Cyprus Expedition: Finds and Results of the Excavation in Cyprus 1927-1931, volume I, volume II, volume III.

From 1933 to 1935, John Lindros served as architect at the Swedish Institute in Rome. He then worked at the Swedish government agency Kungliga Byggnadsstyrelsen in 1936, Swedish Merchants Association (Svenska Köpmannaförbundet) 1936–1937, and the insurance company Liv-Thule 1937–1940. After that Lindros had his own company. In 1944 he was employed at the Västerås county architectural office and in 1947 he became deputy county architect in Södermanland, Sweden.

== Personal life ==
He was married to Rosa Lindros; they had a daughter, Swedish-American educator Birgitta Lindros Wohl. John Lindros died during 1961 at Nyköping, Sweden.
