= Löfvenskiöld =

Swedish noble family

- Noble
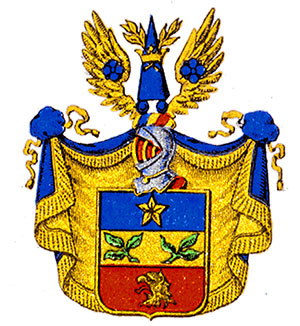
- Country: Sweden
- Current region: Sweden
- Origin: Småland
- Founded: 1743; 283 years ago
- Founder: Henrik Anders Löfvenskiöld
- Titles: Baron; Count
- Members: Henrik Anders Löfvenskiöld; Salomon Löfvenskiöld; Hedvig Löfwenskiöld
- Connected families: Löwenhielm family; Boëthius family; Danckwardt; Löfgren; Linnerhielm family; Leijonhufvud; Helin family
- Traditions: Roman Catholicism; Freemasonry

Löfvenskiöld (English pronunciation: [lˈɜːfvənskˌɪɜːld]) was a Swedish noble family, one branch of which was elevated to the rank of Baron. The noble family has been extinct on the patrilineal side since 1892. The family is also known as Löwenskiöld and also as Löfvingsson.

== History ==
The family's earliest documented ancestor was Anders Simonsson (-1588), who was mayor of Västerås, Sweden. He was the brother of the parliamentarian and mayor Erik Simonsson.

Simon Andersson (1588-1637) is believed to be the son of Anders Simonsson and the second oldest ancestor to the Löfvenskiöld family. According to the Swedish National Archives, during the early 17th century Simon's mother was said to have been the sister of the bailiff Anders Nilsson of Gripsholm Castle, who was ennobled by Duke Karl.

Simon Andersson was initially active in Småland, and later employed at the Royal Court of Sweden, he was eventually appointed chamberlain, after which he became a land accountant in Östergötland. His wife was Elin Eriksdotter Walleria, daughter of the clergyman Ericus Haquini Wallerius [sv] in Högby on the island of Öland. Their children adopted the name Löfgren (other spellings are also found). Their eldest son, Ericus Simoni, became a dean. Another son was Simon Simonsson Löfgréen, who had a daughter married to Jacob Boëthius, whose children also adopted the name Löfgren. The couple had two sons, Eric Löfgreen, who became a cathedral dean, and Carl Löfgréen, who became a mayor and district judge.

Simon Andersson's middle son, Petrus Simonius Löfgren (1627–1691), was a lecturer in Linköping and later became a dean. He was married to Apollonia Danckwardt, sister of both individuals from the family who were ennobled with the name. Their third son, Anders Löfgren, served as a regional chamberlain and was married to a woman from the Scheibe family, though she was not of noble descent. They had a son named Henrik, who became a diplomat and was ennobled with the name Löwenskjöld in 1743. The noble family was introduced with the number 1892 in the Swedish House of Nobility. Henrik Löwenskjöld and his wife Ulrica Wong had several children, but the lineage died out in 1767 with the death of their youngest son, Henric Adolph Löwenskjöld.

The ennobled Henrik Löwenskjöld had two cousins, Alexander and Samuel Löfgren, who both were ennobled and adopted the name Löfvenskjöld in 1756. Their father, Gabriel Löfgren, was the mayor of Helsingborg and a district judge. He was married to Sara Westersköld, whose mother belonged to the Petré family. Alexander Löfgren, later known as Löfvenskjöld, served as a regional secretary in Skaraborg County and a district judge. He was married to noblewomen Elisabeth Linnerhielm, and they had only one child, a son named Olof Gabriel, who was a postmaster and died unmarried. Samuel Löfgren, later known as Löwenskjöld, held the position of an admiral's commissioner and owned Nissafors ironworks and several manor estates, including Nissafors and Snälleröd, which became entailed estates. His wife was a baroness named Raab.

The latter couple had several sons. The eldest son, Salomon Löfvenskjöld, was elevated to the rank of Baron in 1810 according to the 1809 Instrument of Government. He was the father of Anders Löfvenskjöld later adopted by Sven Styf as Löfving Svensson Styf. Solomon Löfvenskjöld passed away without any legitimate children. He established a foundation for the Löfvenskjöld, Coijet, and Lejonhufvud families.

Solomon Anders Löfvenskjöld's brother, Carl Fredrik Löfvenskjöld, was married to the Baroness Åkerhielm af Blombacka, whose sole biological son was architect Charles Emil Löfvenskiöld. The youngest son from a previous relationship, Salomon Fredrik Löfvenskjöld, brought the family line patrilineal to an end in 1892.

== In popular culture ==
The family name is also known through Selma Lagerlöf's authorship. She originally called her novel "Löwenborgska ringen," but the proofreaders changed the family's name, and it became known as "Löwensköldska ringen." Based on the Löfvenskiöld family.

== Notable members ==
- Charles Emil Löfvenskiöld (1810–1888), architect
- Hedvig Löfwenskiöld (1736–1789), poet and writer
- Henrik Anders Löfvenskiöld (1699–1765), court official and Latin scholar
- Salomon Löfvenskiöld (1764–1850), officer and public servant
- Kenny Lövingsson (1945-), businessman and chairman of the Swedish Basketball Federation

== Bibliography ==
- Gabriel Anrep, Svenska adelns ättar-taflor, volym 2
- Svenskt biografiskt lexikon, Stockholm 1983
