= Axel Boëthius =

Swedish classical archaeologist (1889–1969)

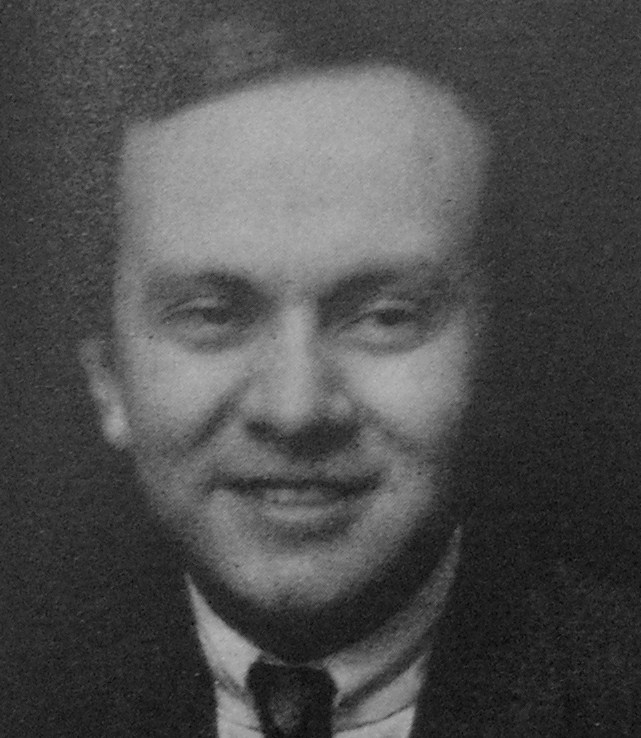
Axel Boëthius

Carl Axel Boëthius (July 18, 1889, in Arvika, Sweden – May 7, 1969, in Rome, Italy) was a scholar and archaeologist of Etruscan culture. Boëthius was primarily a student of Etruscan and Italic architecture. His father was the historian Simon Boëthius.

As a student, Boëthius studied at the Uppsala University, where he completed his Ph.D. in 1918. During the Finnish Civil War he fought for the White Movement’s volunteer Swedish Brigade. He taught at Uppsala (1921–24) during which time he excavated at Mycenae in Greece. In 1925 he was selected as the first director of the Swedish Institute at Rome by the Swedish crown prince Gustav Adolf (also known as an accomplished amateur archaeologist). He became professor of archaeology at the University of Gothenburg in 1934, a post he held until 1955. He also served as rector of the university (1946–51). In 1955, he retired to Italy. There he published his book Golden House of Nero in 1960, which was the product of the Thomas Spencer Jerome Lectures given in Rome. Boëthius, working together with John Bryan Ward-Perkins, wrote the section on Etruscan architecture for the prestigious Pelican History of Art series. The volume was published in 1970, shortly after his death in 1969.

== Publications ==
- [dissertation:] Die Pythaïs: Studien zur Geschichte der Verbindungen zwischen Athen und Delphi. Uppsala: Almquist & Wiksells, 1918.
- and Ward-Perkins, John. Etruscan and Roman Architecture. Pelican History of Art 32. Baltimore: Penguin, 1970. Revised edition as: Axel Boëthius, Roger Ling, Tom Rasmussen, Etruscan and Early Roman Architecture, Yale University Press Pelican history of art, 1978, Yale University Press, ISBN 0300052901, 9780300052909
- The Golden House of Nero: some Aspects of Roman Architecture. Ann Arbor, MI: University of Michigan Press,1960.
- and Sahlen, Nils G. Etruscan Culture, Land and People: Archaeological Research and Studies Conducted in San Giovenale and its Environs by Members of the Swedish Institute in Rome. New York: Columbia University Press, 1963.
