= Löfgren =

Löfgren or Lofgren is a Swedish surname. Notable people with the surname include:

== Löfgren ==
- Anna-Lena Löfgren (1944–2010), Swedish singer
- Charles Löfgren, chairman of Västmanland-Nerikes BK
- Eliel Löfgren (1872–1940), Swedish jurist and politician
- Johan Albert Constantin Löfgren (1854–1918), botanist at the Rio de Janeiro Botanical Garden
- Gösta Löfgren (1891–1932), Finnish footballer
- Gösta Löfgren (1923–2006), Swedish footballer
- Jonna Löfgren, drummer of the Scottish band Glasvegas
- Katia Löfgren, singer of the Swedish band Caramell
- Marianne Löfgren (1910–1957), Swedish actress
- Mikael Löfgren (born 1969), Swedish biathlete
- Nils Löfgren (1913–1967), Swedish chemist
- Sara Löfgren (born 1977), Swedish singer
- Stig Löfgren (1912–1998), Swedish Army lieutenant general
- Tomas Löfgren, Swedish ski-orienteering competitor and world champion
- Ulla Löfgren (born 1943), Swedish politician of the Moderate Party

== Lofgren ==
- Edward J. Lofgren (1914–2016), American physicist
- Esther Lofgren (born 1985), American rower
- Karen Lofgren (born 1976), Canadian artist
- Mark Lofgren (born 1961), American politician
- Mike Lofgren, American politician
- Nils Lofgren (born 1951), American musician
- William Lofgren (1913–2004), American canoer
- William Lofgren, American tennis player
- Zoe Lofgren (born 1947), American politician

== See also ==
- Lofgren Peninsula - ice-covered peninsula, Antarctica
- Löfgren syndrome - type of acute sarcoidosis
- Nils (album) - 1979 record album by Nils Lofgren
- Nils Lofgren (album) - 1975 record album by Nils Lofgren
- 7157 Lofgren - Main-belt Asteroid discovered by S. J. Bus at Siding Spring Observatory
