= Alfred Westholm =

Swedish archaeologist (1904-1996)

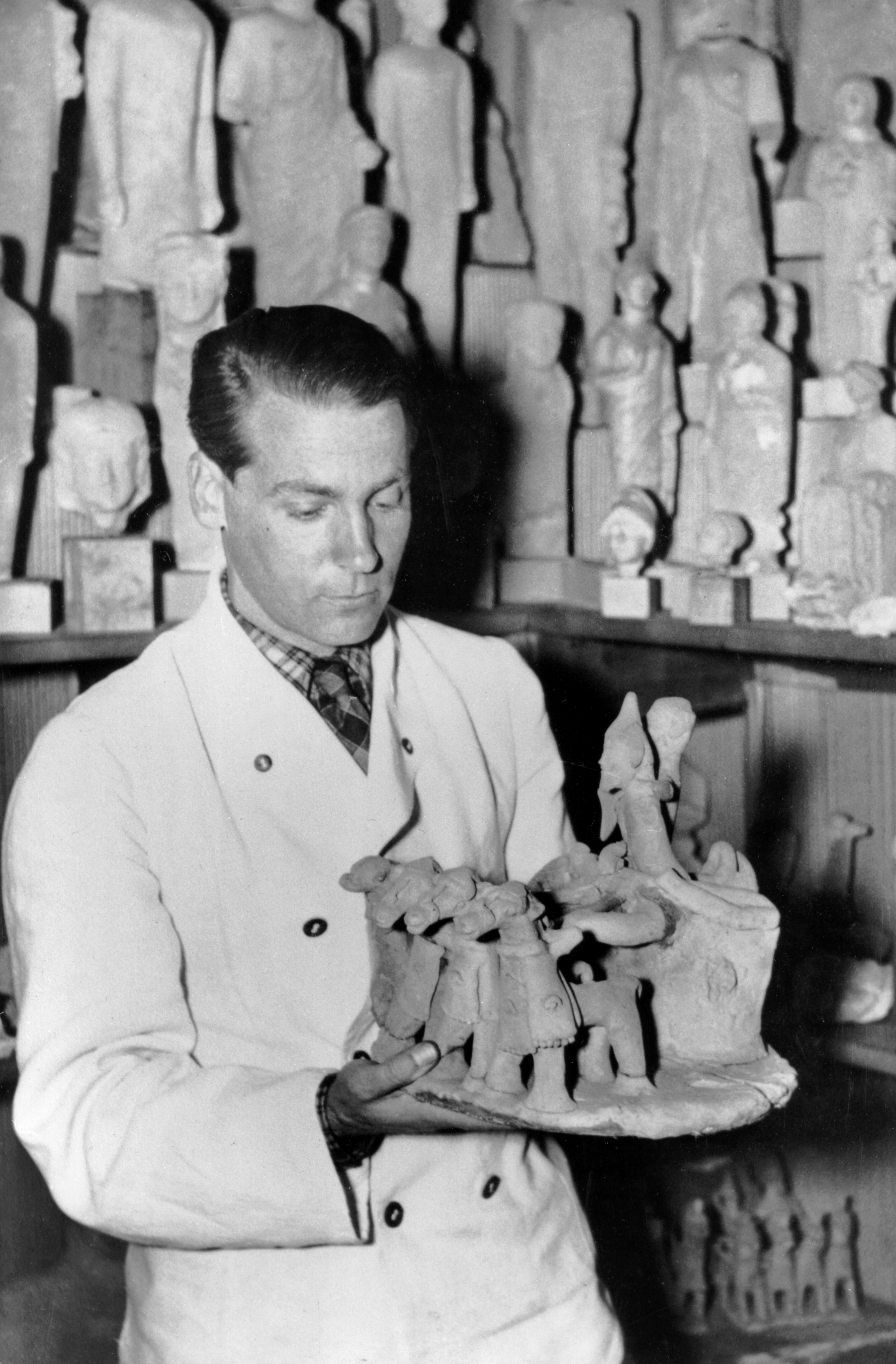
- Born: 22 June 1904
- Died: 7 June 1996
- Notable work: Swedish Cyprus Expedition
- Scientific career
- Fields: archaeology

Daniel Alfred Westholm (22 June 1904 - 7 June 1996) was a Swedish archaeologist. He participated in the Swedish Cyprus Expedition, along with archaeologists Einar Gjerstad and Erik Sjöqvist and with architect John Lindros.

== Biography ==
Daniel Alfred Westholm was born at Falun in Dalarna County, Sweden, He was the son of Alfred Emanuel Westholm and Anna Hilma Augusta Bäckström. His father was associate professor in Modern Languages at Falun. His brother was architect Sten Westholm.

Alfred Westholm studied Nordic history and art history at Stockholm University, and classical history and ancient history at Uppsala University from 1924 to 1925. He participated in the Swedish archaeological excavations in Asine in 1926 and Dendra in 1927.

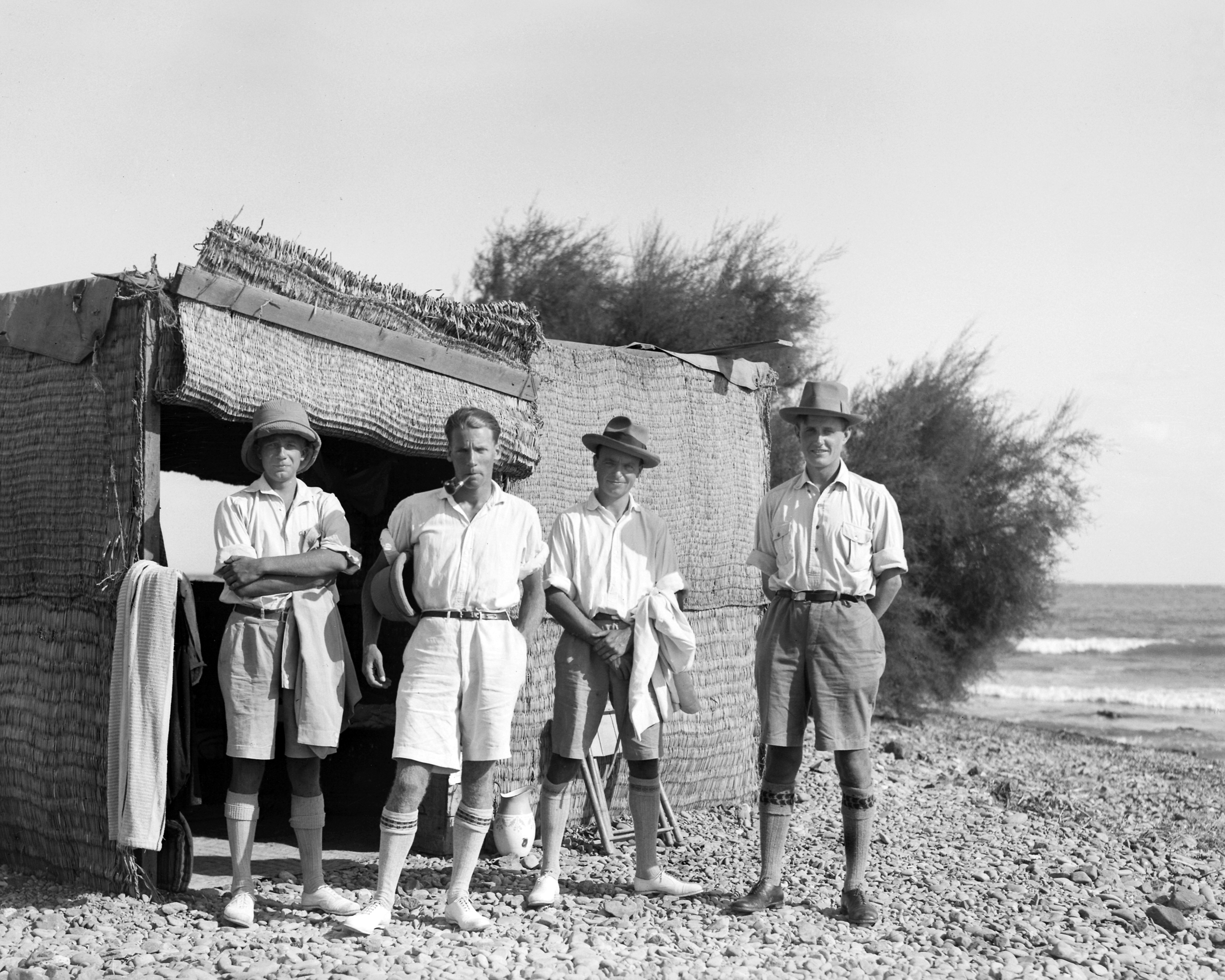
Swedish Cyprus Expedition 1930, from left: John Lindros, Alfred Westholm, Erik Sjöqvist and Einar Gjerstad

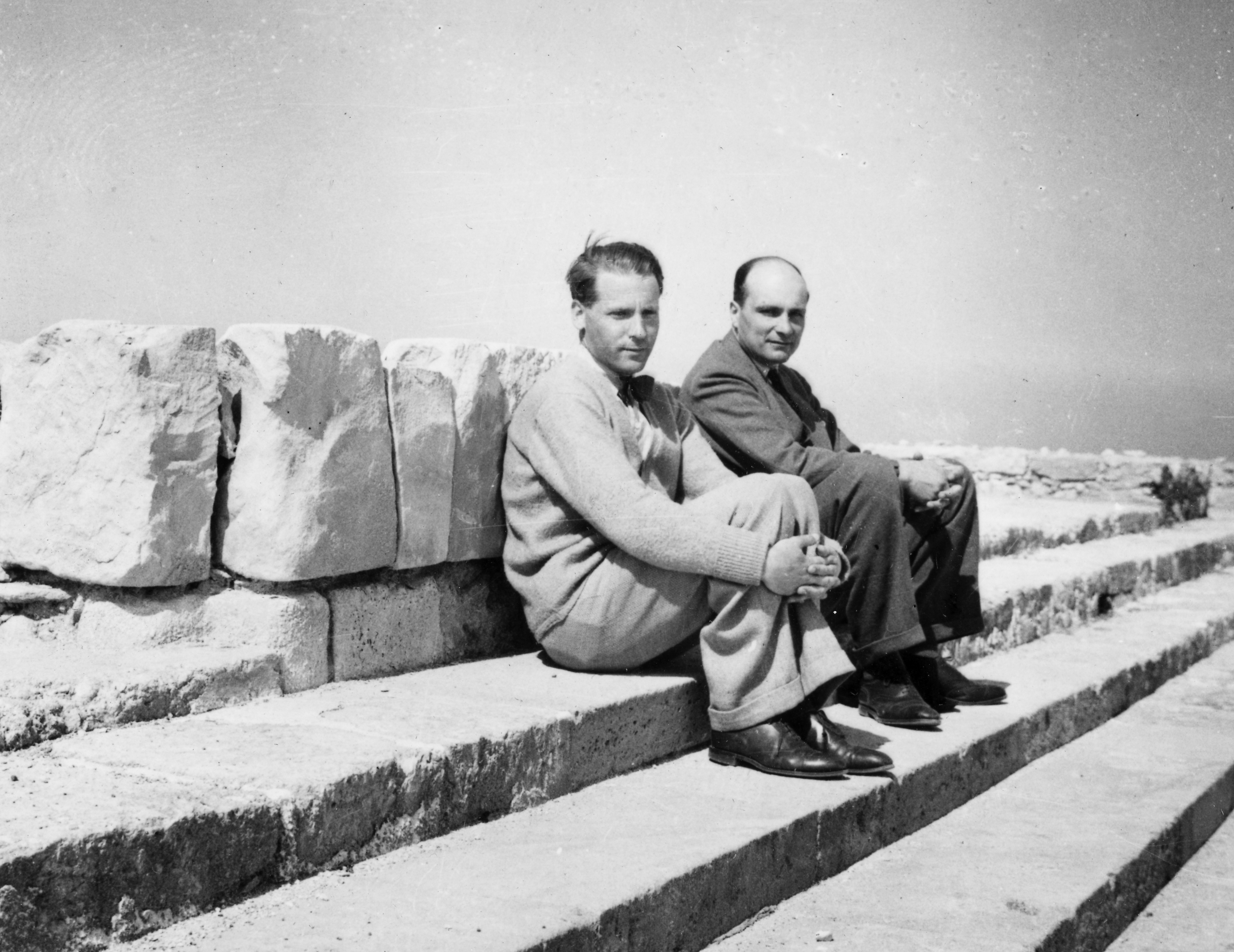
Alfred Westholm and Knut Richard Thyberg in Cypern

The Swedish Cyprus Expedition was a project to systematically investigate the archaeology of the early history of Cyprus. It took place between September 1927 and March 1931. Westholm was recruited by Einar Gjerstad and was given the responsibility to lead one of the two excavation teams. Westholm carried out the excavations in: Soli, Milia, Vouni, Petra tou Limniti, Ajios Jakovos (Iron Age site), Kition, Kythrea, Amathus and Mersinaki.

During his stay in Cyprus, Westholm wrote many letters home which have been published in book form, and give a unique insight into the expedition's work and daily life. After the expedition's excavations were formally completed, Westholm, with the help of influence from then Crown Prince Gustaf Adolf was able to continue and dug out the Soli Cholades site, where six different temples were dug out. These would be the subject of the dissertation The Temples of Soli (1936), at Stockholm University. After returning home, Westholm served as head of the Cyprus collections in Stockholm until 1944. A major part of the work was the processing of the expedition's results for the publication The Swedish Cyprus Expedition.

In 1937 he represented Sweden at an international congress on excavation and memorial legislation, organized by the League of Nations in Cairo. During the 1930s he worked as editor of the publication of the former diggings in Asine. In 1940, Westholm arranged the exhibition "Before Fidias" at the Swedish History Museum. Most of the exhibits were collected from the Cyprus collections. He was also responsible for the work of the exhibition "10,000 years in Sweden" in the same museum in 1943.

During World War II, Westholm was a secretary for a committee aimed at collecting money in support of the people of occupied Greece. Half a million Swedish krona was collected. From 1944 to 1947, Westholm served in the first laboratory at Gothenburg Art Museum. He then served as head of the same institution until retirement in 1969.

In 1956, he traveled on behalf of UNESCO to Peru to plan a new art museum in Lima. In 1958, he took over responsibility for the unfinished Swedish excavations in Labranda, Turkey. From 1969 to 1973, he served as director of the Swedish Research Institute in Istanbul.

== Personal life ==
Westholm was honored with the Order of Vasa in 1937. He was married from 1940 to Ingegärd Beskow, daughter of Swedish Finance Minister Jacob Beskow and Esther Olesen. They had five children. Westholm died at Ramsberg, Örebro County, Sweden.

== Bibliography ==
- Gjerstad, E. et al. (1934). The Swedish Cyprus Expedition: Finds and Results of the Excavation in Cyprus 1927-1931. Vol. I, Stockholm.
- Gjerstad, E. et al. (1935). The Swedish Cyprus Expedition: Finds and Results of the Excavation in Cyprus 1927-1931. Vol. II, Stockholm.
- Westholm, A. (1936). The Temples of Soli. Studies on Cypriote Art during Hellenistic and Roman Periods, Stockholm.
- Gjerstad, E. et al. (1937). The Swedish Cyprus Expedition: Finds and Results of the Excavation in Cyprus 1927-1931. Vol. III, Stockholm.
- Westholm, A. (1940). “A Hoard of Bronze Coins of Constans II.” Nordisk Numismatisk Arsskrift 1, 135–47
- Vessberg, O., Westholm, A. (1956). The Swedish Cyprus Expedition: Finds and Results of the Excavation in Cyprus 1927-1931. Vol. IV:3, Stockholm.
- Westholm, A.; Eriksson, N. (ed) (2007). "The fantastic years on Cyprus": illustrated extracts from Alfred Westholm's letters to his parents, 1927-, Paul Åströms.
- Westholm, A. (1996), De fantastiska åren på Cypern. Brev till föräldrarna 1927-1931, Paul Åström, Sävedalen.
