= Arvid Andrén =

Swedish archaeologist and art historian

Arvid Andrén (10 February 1902 – 14 June 1999) was a Swedish art historian. He is most commonly associated with his publication Architectural Terracottas from Etrusco-Italic Temples (Lund: Gleerup. 1940)

== Biography ==
Andrén was born at Trelleborg in Skåne, Sweden. Andrén was an associate professor at Lund University (1940–52) and Stockholm University (1953-68) receiving the title of professor in 1964. Andrén served as director of the Swedish Institute at Rome from 1948 to 1952 and 1964–1966. Andrén focused his work on decorative architectural terracotta sculpture from ancient Italy and Greece. He participated in several archaeological excavations in the Mediterranean world, including at Messenia in Greece (1933 and 1935), at Ardea (1952 and 1953) and at Blera (1965) in Italy.

== Other sources ==
- Obituary "Arvid Andrén," Romhorisont 19 (1999) 14–5.
