= Einar Gjerstad =

Swedish archaeologist (1897–1988)

Einar Nilson Gjerstad
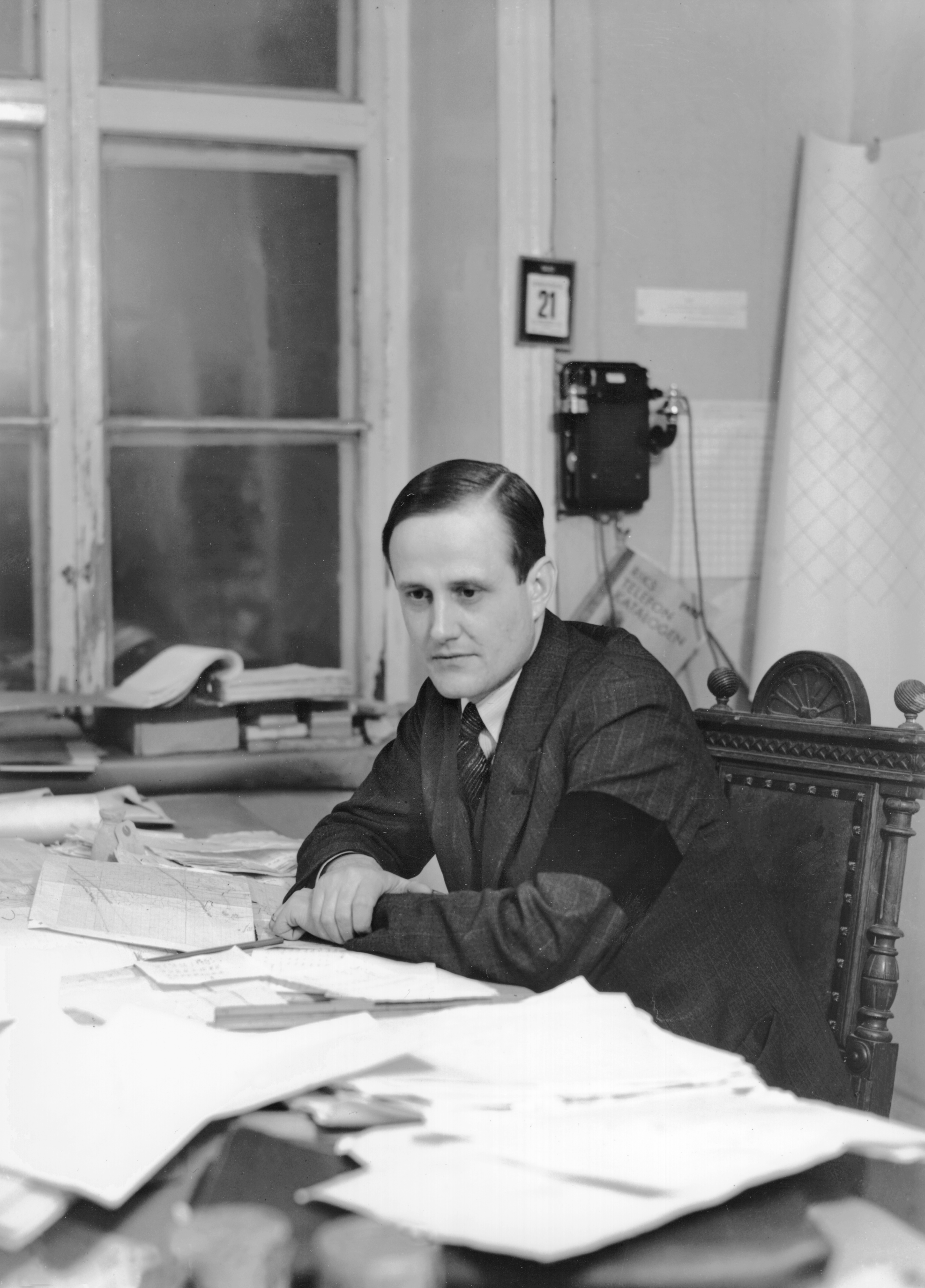
- Born: 30 October 1897; Örebro, Sweden
- Died: 8 January 1988 (aged 90); Lund, Sweden
- Education: Uppsala University
- Known for: Study of Cypriot Bichrome ware; Early Rome
- Scientific career
- Fields: Classical archaeology
- Workplaces: The Swedish Institute at Rome; Lund University
- Doctoral advisor: Axel Persson

Einar Nilson Gjerstad (30 October 1897 – 8 January 1988) was a Swedish archaeologist. He was most noted for his research of the ancient Mediterranean, particularly known for his work on Cyprus, as well as his studies of early Rome.

== Biography ==
Gjerstad studied at Uppsala University, where he earned a bachelor's degree. 1920, fil.mag. 1921, fil.lic. 1923, and received his doctorate in 1926. In 1922 he was an assistant at excavations in Asine under Axel W. Persson (1888–1951), professor of classical archaeology and ancient history at Uppsala University. From 1926 until 1935 he was professor of classical archaeology and ancient history at Uppsala University.

Gjerstad had the opportunity to go to Cyprus and conduct investigations 1923–1924, for example in Kalopsida. From 1927 until 1931 Gjerstad led the Swedish Cyprus Expedition. The expedition was intended to make a complete study of the ancient culture of Cyprus. Gjerstad served as the expedition's leader with overall responsibility, while Erik Sjöqvist and Alfred Westholm led most of the excavations. He was a pioneer in the study of Cypriot Bichrome ware.

From 1935 until 1940, Gjerstad served as director the Swedish Institute at Rome. When Gjerstad left Rome in 1940, he assumed the position of Professor of Classical Archaeology and Ancient History at Lund University.

== Legacy ==
On 1 November 1972 president of Cyprus, Makarios III, unveiled in the presence of Gjerstad, a stele at the Palace of Vouni in honour of Einar Gjerstad and the work conducted by the Swedish Cyprus Expedition.

A street has been named after him in Larnaca, Cyprus. (It is adjacent to the Bamboula archaeological site of Kition.)

== Publications ==
- 1926 Studies on Prehistoric Cyprus
- 1934 The Swedish Cyprus Expedition: Finds and Results of the Excavation in Cyprus 1927-1931. Vol. I
- 1935 The Swedish Cyprus Expedition: Finds and Results of the Excavation in Cyprus 1927-1931. Vol. II
- 1937 The Swedish Cyprus Expedition: Finds and Results of the Excavation in Cyprus 1927-1931. Vol. III
- 1953 Early Rome Vol. I: Stratigraphical researches in the Forum Romanum and along the Sacra Via
- 1956 Early Rome Vol. II: The tombs
- 1960 Early Rome Vol. III: Fortifications, domestic architecture, sanctuaries, stratigraphic excavations
- 1962 Legends and Facts of Early Roman History
- 1966 Early Rome Vol. IV: Synthesis of archaeological evidence
- 1967 Les Origines de la république Romaine: neuf exposés suivis de discussions
- 1973 Early Rome Vol. V: The written sources
- 1973 Early Rome Vol. VI: Historical survey
- 1977 Greek Geometric and Archaic Pottery found in Cyprus, Stockholm: Swedish Institute in Athens.
- 1980 Ages and Days in Cyprus, Paul Åström, Göteborg.

== Other Sources ==
- Einar Gjerstad research papers, 1806-1984, Getty Research Institute, Los Angeles. Accession No. 900228. The archive includes research notes, photographs, drawings, typescripts and publication production materials for Gjerstad's extensive studies of the archaeology of Cyprus and early Rome.
- "Einar Gjerstad," in A Historical Dictionary of Classical Archaeology, ed. Nancy T. de Grummond (Greenwood Press, Westport, Connecticut 1996).
- Einar Gjerstad's Cypriote publications. A bibliography by Paul Astrom.
- Einar Gjerstad research papers, 1806-1984
- Finding aid for the Einar Gjerstad research papers, 1806-1984
