= Lofgren Peninsula =

Peninsula of Ellsworth Land

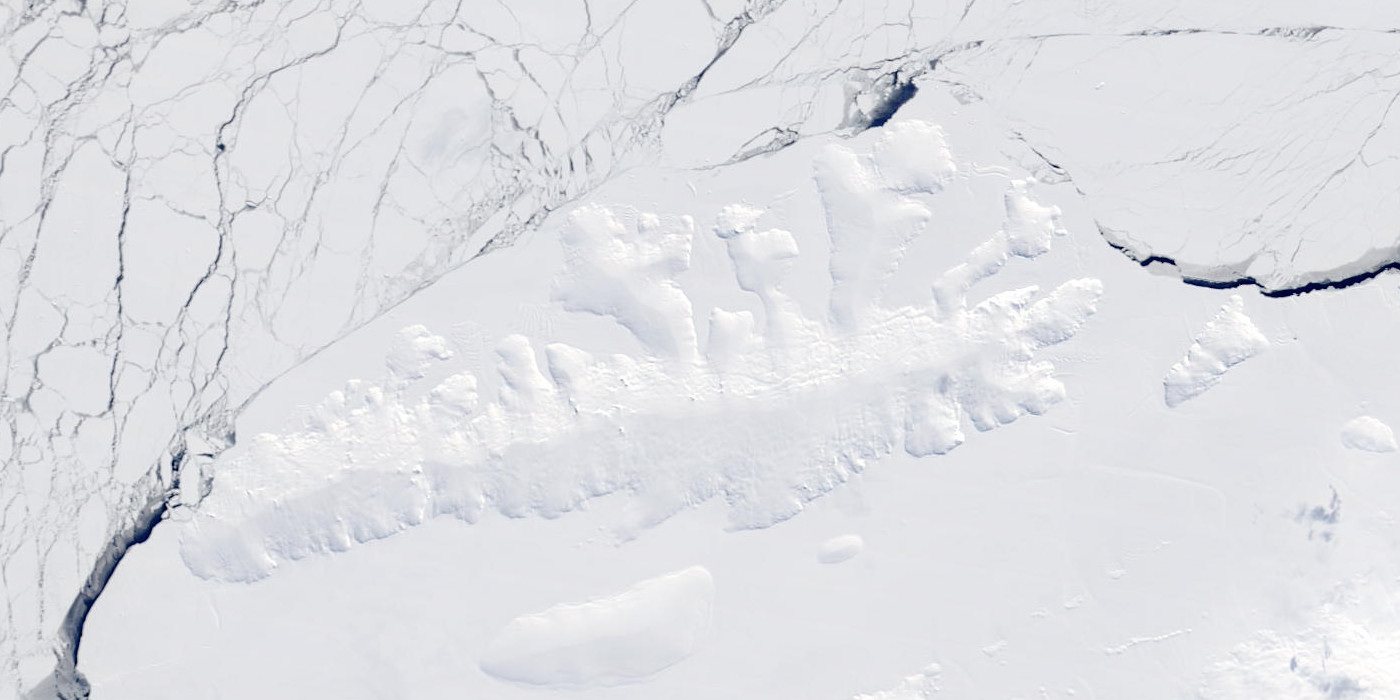
- Satellite image of the Thurston Island

- Location within Antarctica

Geography
- Location: Antarctica
- Coordinates: 72°08′S 96°00′W

Lofgren Peninsula (72°08′S 96°00′W) is an ice-covered peninsula about 22 nautical miles (41 km; 25 mi) long, projecting between Cadwalader Inlet and Morgan Inlet on the northeast side of Thurston Island, Antarctica.

== Location ==
Thurston Island in north of map. Lofgren Peninsula in east of island

Lofren Peninsula is at the east end of Thurston Island between Cadwalader Inlet to the north and Morgan Inlet to the south. Cape Menzel is the northeast tip of the peninsula. Barrett Island is just east of the peninsula.

== Mapping and name ==
Lofgren Peninsula was discovered in helicopter flights from the USS Burton Island and the USS Glacier of the U.S. Navy Bellingshausen Sea Expedition in February 1960. It was named by the UNited States Advisory Committee on Antarctic Names (US-ACAN) for Charles E. Lofgren, personnel officer with the Byrd Antarctic Expedition, 1928–30.

== Named features ==
=== Cape Menzel ===
72°00′S 95°43′W. A bold rock cape marking the north extremity of otherwise icecovered Lofgren Peninsula, in the northeast part of Thurston Island. Discovered on helicopter flights from the USS Burton Island and Glacier by personnel of United States Navy Bellingshausen Sea Expedition in February 1960. Named by US-ACAN for Reinhard W. Menzel, geomagnetist-seismologist with the Eights Station winter party, 1965.

=== Barrett Island ===
72°09′S 95°30′W. An ice-covered island about 2 nautical miles (3.7 km; 2.3 mi) long, lying just within the north part of the mouth of Morgan Inlet. Mapped by USGS from surveys and United States Navy air photos, 1960-66. Named by US-ACAN for Lieutenant (j.g.) Barry B. Barrett, pilot of Squadron VX-6 on photographic flights during United States Navy OpDFrz 1964.

=== Walsh Knob ===
72.2166667°S 96.05°W. A small but distinctive ice-covered elevation that rises midway along the south side of Lofgren Peninsula. The feature has a rounded appearance except for a cliff at the south side. Named by Advisory Committee on Antarctic Names (US-ACAN) after R.W. Walsh, Photographer's Mate in the Eastern Group of U.S. Navy (USN) Operation Highjump, which obtained aerial photographs of Thurston Island and adjacent coastal areas, 1946-47.

=== Mills Cliff ===
72.1666667°S 95.8833333°W. An isolated rock cliff in the north-central part of Lofgren Peninsula, Thurston Island. Named by Advisory Committee on Antarctic Names (US-ACAN) after Aviation Machinist's Mate William H. Mills, aircrewman in the Eastern Group of U.S. Navy (USN) Operation Highjump, which obtained aerial photographs of Thurston Island and adjacent coastal areas, 1946-47.

== Sources ==
- Alberts, Fred G., ed. (1995), Geographic Names of the Antarctic (PDF) (2 ed.), United States Board on Geographic Names This article incorporates public domain material from websites or documents of the United States Board on Geographic Names.
- "Mills Cliff", Geographic Names Information System, United States Geological Survey, United States Department of the Interior
- Thurston Island (PDF), USGS: United States Geological Survey
- "Walsh Knob", Geographic Names Information System, United States Geological Survey, United States Department of the Interior
- This article incorporates public domain material from websites or documents of the United States Geological Survey.
