= Swedish Institute in Rome =

Archaeological research institute in Sweden

Coordinates: 41.916845°N 12.478597°E

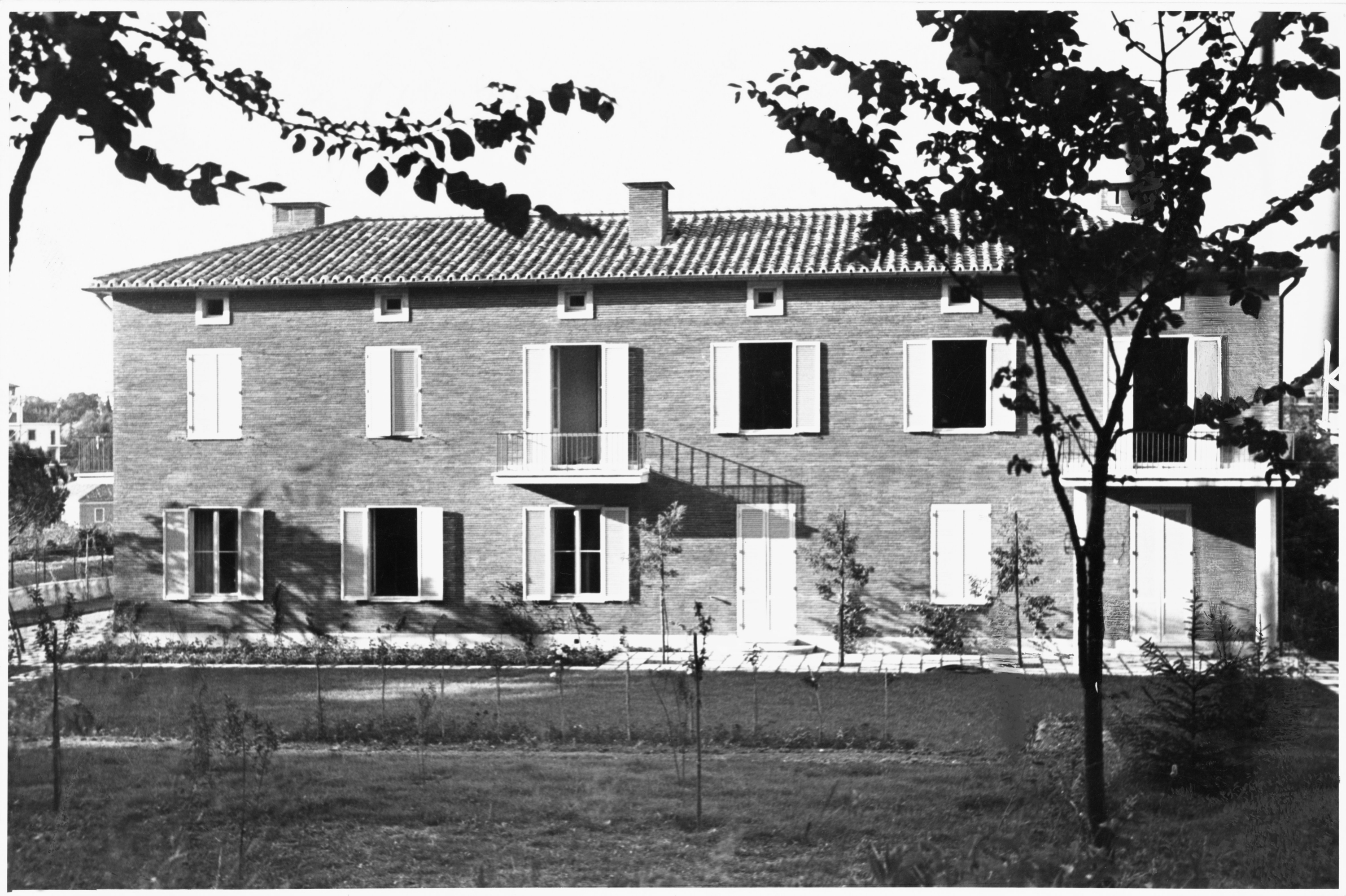
Exterior of the building.

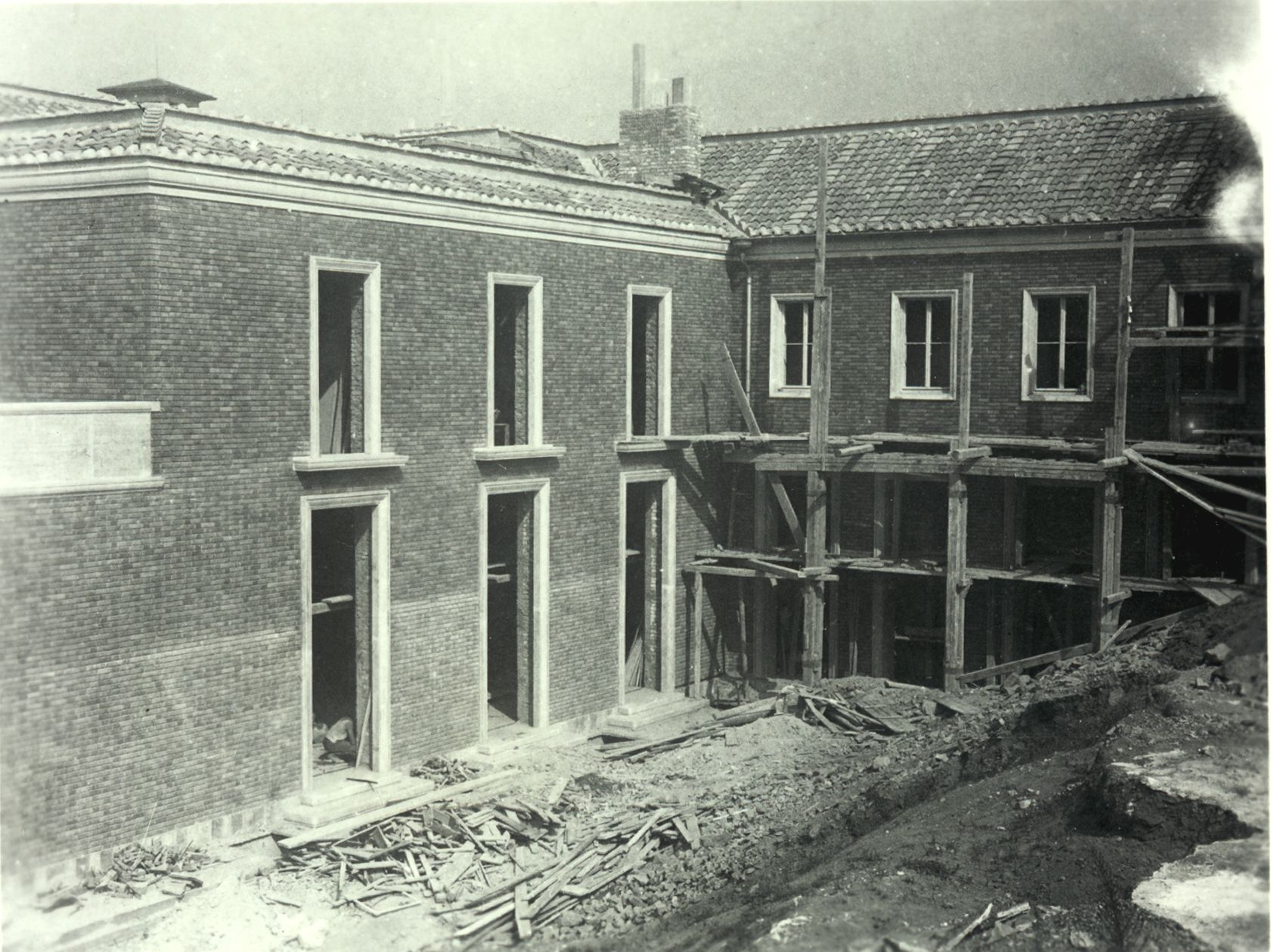
Building being constructed, 1937.

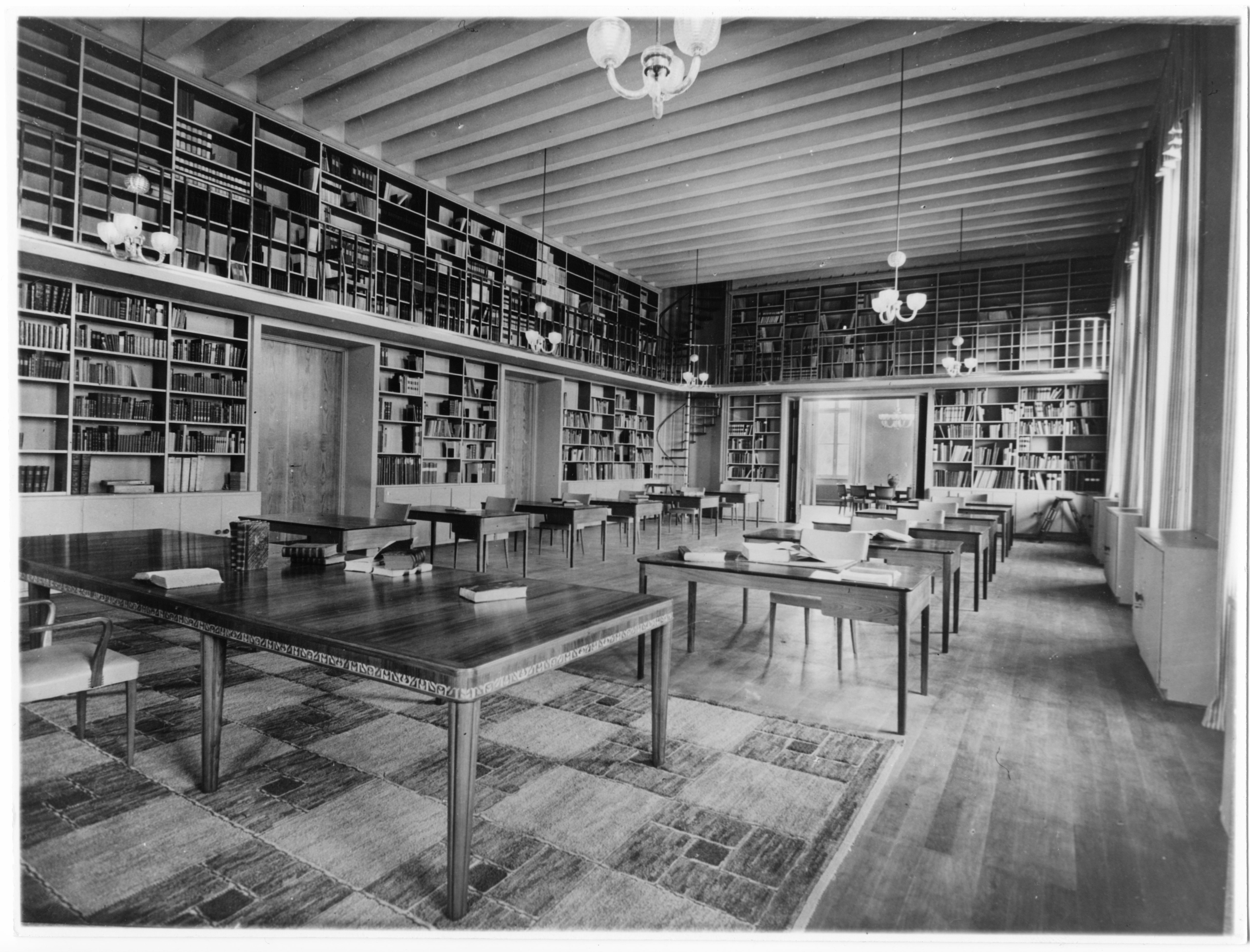
The library.

The Swedish Institute in Rome (Swedish: Svenska institutet i Rom, Italian: Istituto Svedese di studi classici a Roma) is a research institution that serves as the base for archaeological excavations and other scientific research in Italy. It also pursues academic instruction in archaeology and art sciences as well as arranging conferences with themes of interest to the institute. The institute has at its disposal a building in central Rome, designed by Ivar Tengbom, with a relatively well-supplied library, archaeological laboratory and around twenty rooms and smaller apartments for the use of visiting researchers and holders of scholarships.

The institute was founded in 1925 by, among others, King Gustaf VI Adolf, then Crown Prince of Sweden.

== Excavations ==
The institute has conducted several major excavations. Before World War II, excavations were carried out on the Forum Romanum among other places, but since then most of them have taken place in southern Etruria.

- Acquarossa, 1966–1978
- San Giovenale, 1956–1965
- Luni sul Mignone, 1960–1963
- Selvasecca di Blera, 1965–1971

== Directors ==
- Axel Boëthius (1926–35, 1952–53, 1955–57)
- Einar Gjerstad (1935–40)
- Erik Sjöqvist (1940–48)
- Arvid Andrén (1948–52, 1964–66)
- Olov Vessberg (1953–55)
- Erik Wellin (1957–61)
- Bengt E. Thomasson (1961–64)
- Paul Åström (1967–70)
- Carl Eric Östenberg (1970–78)
- Carl Nylander (1979–97)
- Anne-Marie Leander Touati (1997–2001)
- Barbro Santillo Frizell (2001–2013)
- Kristian Göransson (2013–2019)
- Ulf R. Hansson (2019–)

== See also ==
- Swedish Institute
