= Karen Lofgren =

Canadian artist

Karen Lofgren (born 1976 in Toronto, Ontario) is a Canadian artist.

Lofgren received her MFA at CalArts. Her works include installation, site-specific projects, video, and sound. She has been an artist-in-residence at Pitzer College (2009) and the Vancouver Biennale (2014). Lofgren has had solo exhibitions at the Armory Center for the Arts in Pasadena, California, Royale Projects Contemporary Art in Palm Desert, California, and Machine Project in Los Angeles.
