= Boëthius family =

Boëthius is a Swedish clerical family descended from Herr Anders, the first Protestant vicar of Sidensjö in Ångermanland (early 16th century). His grandson Boëtius Olai Moræus (died 1628) took his surname from Mora, where he served as vicar. His given name Boëtius was a latinization of the Swedish name Bo and was assumed as a surname by his grandson Jacob Boëthius (1647–1718) who was vicar of Mora and spent ten years in prison as a political dissident. Later notable members of this family include the following:

- Daniel Boëthius (1751–1810), enlightenment philosopher
- Jacob Edvard Boëthius (1789–1849), jurist
- Simon Boëthius (1850–1924), historian, political scientist and politician
- Bertil Boëthius (1885–1974), historian, head of the Swedish National Archives 1944–1950
- Axel Boëthius (1889–1969), classical archaeologist
- Gerda Boëthius (1890–1961), art historian
- Maria-Pia Boëthius (b. 1947), feminist writer and journalist
