= Högby Church, Öland =

Högby Church
- Högby kyrka
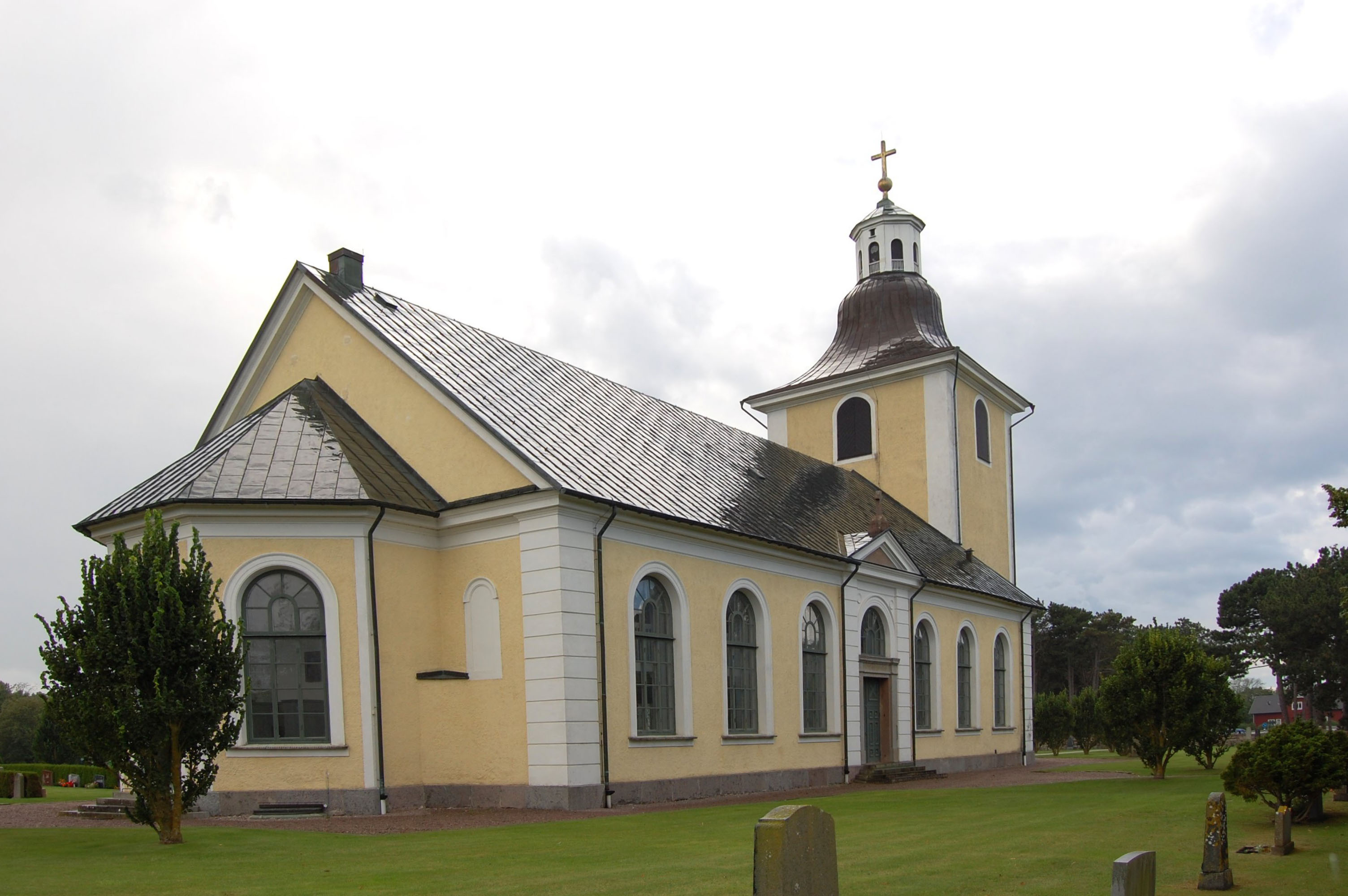
- Högby Church, view of the exterior

- Location within Kalmar
- 57°09′51″N 17°00′59″E
- Country: Sweden
- Denomination: Church of Sweden

Administration
- Diocese: Växjö

Högby Church (Swedish: Högby kyrka) is a Lutheran church on the Swedish island of Öland. It belongs to the Diocese of Växjö.

== History and architecture ==
Högby Church was built during the Middle Ages; construction started in the middle of the 12th century. The church tower, built during the second half of the 12th century, is however the only part that remains of the medieval church. In 1870-1871, the medieval church was demolished except for the tower and a new church with neoclassical style features was erected.

The new church still contains several furnishings from the older church. Among them is an altarpiece dedicated to the Virgin Mary from the 15th century (the Madonna itself is from the 14th century). There is also an altarpiece from the 15th century dedicated to Saint Peter and a triumphal cross from circa 1500. The baptismal font of red limestone is from 1654.

== Gallery ==
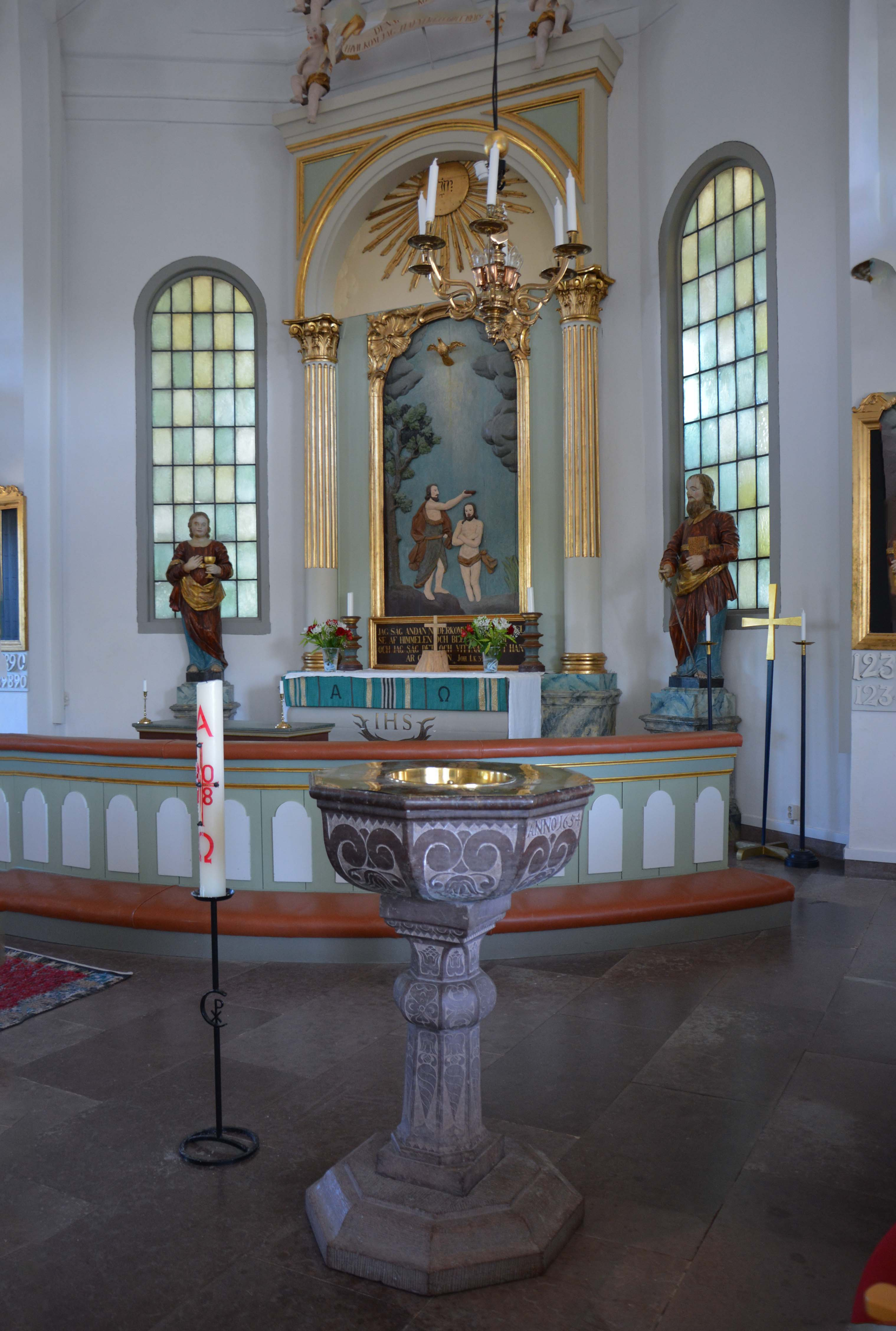
Baptismal font

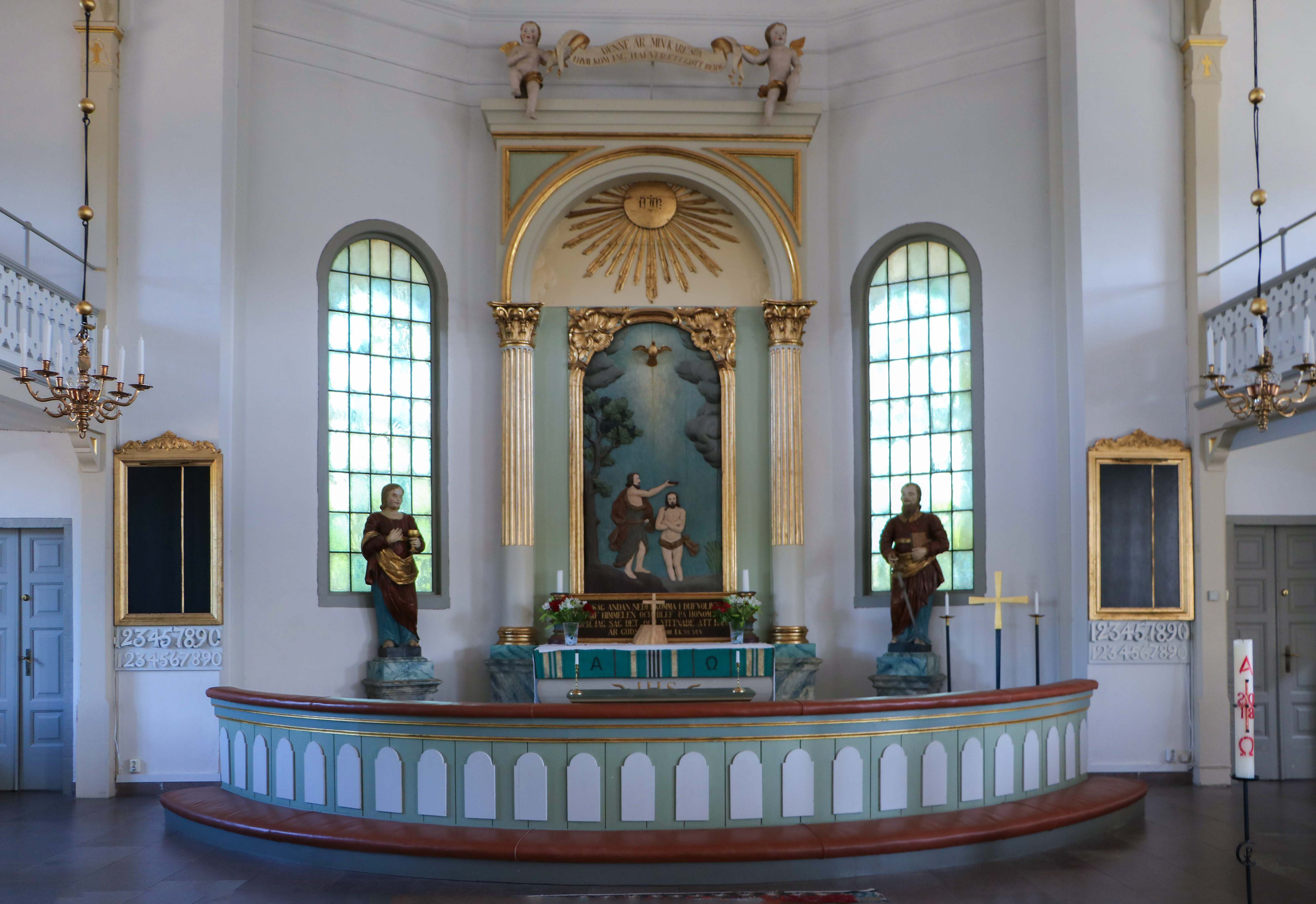
Altar

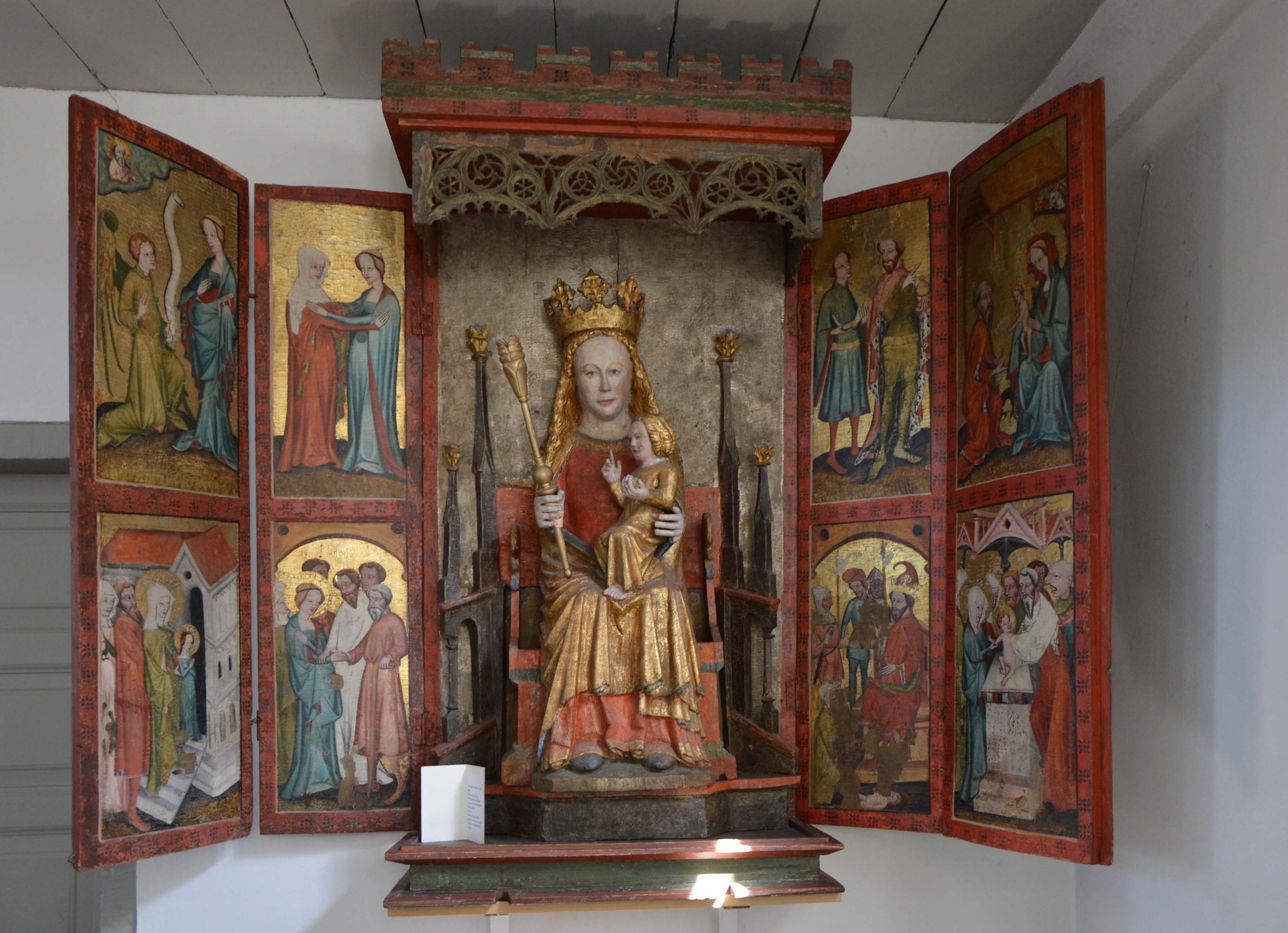
Altarpiece

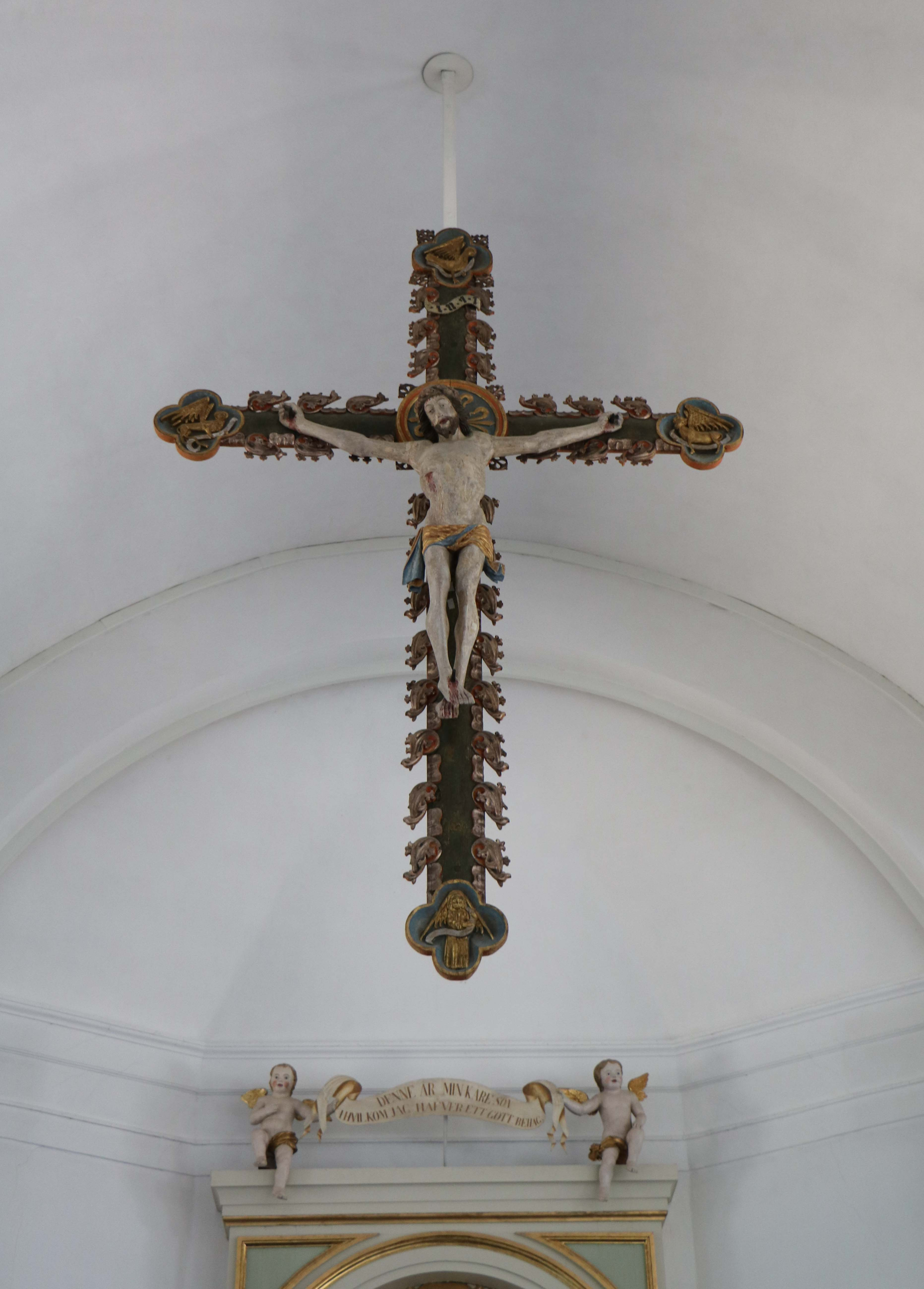
Triumphal Cross

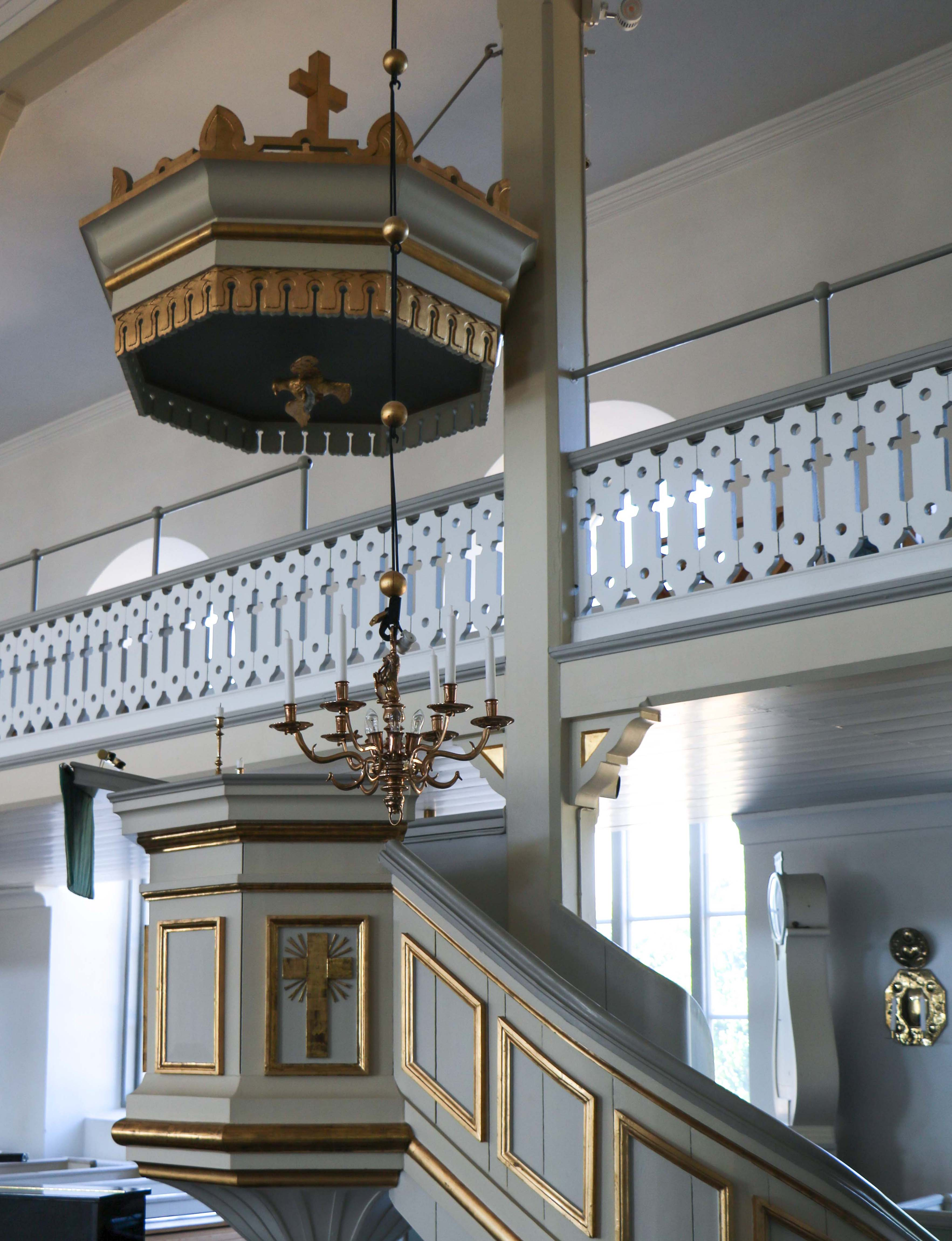
Pulpit

== Other sources ==
- Boström, Ragnhild (1968) Högby kyrkor : Åkerbo härad, Öland (Stockholm: Almqvist & Wiksell)
