= Erik Sjöqvist =

Swedish archaeologist and educator

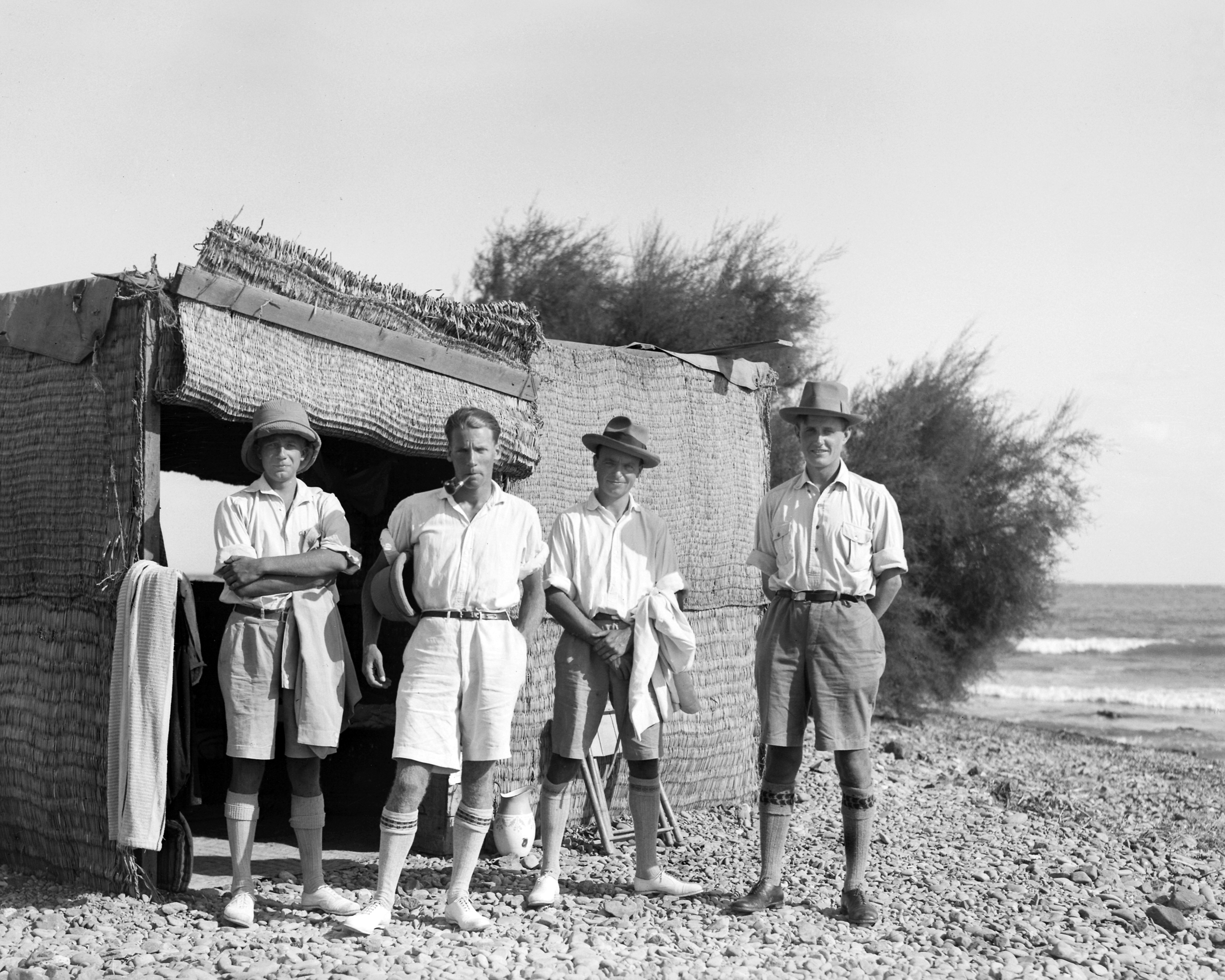
Swedish Cyprus Expedition 1930 from left: John Lindros, Alfred Westholm, Erik Sjöqvist and Einar Gjerstad

Erik Sjöqvist (15 July 1903 – 16 July 1975) was a Swedish archaeologist and educator. Sjöqvist conducted archaeological fieldwork in Cyprus while participating in Swedish Cyprus Expedition. He was director of Swedish Institute at Rome and professor of classical archaeology at Princeton University. He is most commonly associated with development of the excavations of the archaeological sites at Morgantina in Sicily.

== Biography ==
Sjöqvist was born at Ronneby in Blekinge County, Sweden. He was the son of John Sjöqvist, professor of medical chemistry and pharmacy at the Karolinska Institutet, Stockholm. He was the elder brother of neurological surgeon Carl Olof Sjøqvist (1901–1954). He studied classical archeology under Axel W. Persson (1888–1951), professor of classical archaeology and ancient history at Uppsala University.

From 1927 until 1931, he participated in the Swedish Cyprus Expedition. The expedition was intended to make a complete study of the ancient culture of Cyprus. The expedition was led by Einar Gjerstad. Erik Sjöqvist and Alfred Westholm led most of the excavations.

In 1940, he succeeded Einar Gjerstad as director of the Swedish Institute in Rome. Sjöqvist stayed in Rome until 1948. Sjöqvist joined the Princeton faculty in 1951 where he served one year as a visiting professor of Classical Archeology. He was subsequently offered a permanent position as a professor at Princeton, a position that lasted until 1969.

His arrival at Princeton was heralded by the Princeton administration as a ripe opportunity for a revival of interest in Classical studies. In 1955, Sjöqvist was responsible for the inception of the Princeton sponsored excavations of the city of Morgantina in Sicily. The excavations were intended to serve as training for graduate students in the Princeton University, Department of Art and Archaeology. Sjöqvist and Prof. Richard Stillwell jointly directed excavations at the site from 1955 to 1963 and again from 1966 to 1967.

== Personal life ==
He was married to Gurli Sjöqvist. Sjöqvist also served as adviser to the Swedish Crown Prince, and later King, Gustaf VI Adolf. Erik Sjöqvist died at Stockholm during 1975.

== Bibliography ==
1. Svenska Cypernexpeditionen, 1927–1931, The Swedish Cyprus expedition : finds and results of the excavations in Cyprus, 1927-1931 ..., Stockholm, The Swedish Cyprus Expedition, [1934-. - v. and atlas of plates v.
2. Sjöqvist, Erik, Problems of the late Cypriote bronze age, Stockholm, The Swedish Cyprus Expedition, [1940], 226 p. "The study ... is based upon primary material brought to light during the expedition's excavations in Cyprus in 1927-1931 and already published by Einar Gjerstad and myself in the two first volumes ... [under title: The Swedish Cyprus Expedition]". (Thèse, Histoire, Uppsala, 1940)
3. Sjöqvist, Erik, Reports on excavations in Cyprus. The swedish Cyprus expedition : finds and results of the excavations in Cyprus 1927-1931. Vol. I, Revised reprint, Stockholm, V. Petterson, 1940, 240 p.
4. Sjöqvist, Erik, Sicily and the Greeks : studies in the interrelationship between the indigenous populations and the greek colonists, Ann Arbor (Mich.), University of Michigan Press, cop. 1973, XIII-90 p. (Jerome lectures; 9th series). ISBN 0-472-08795-9. - ISBN 9780472087952

== Other Sources ==
1. City of gold : the archaeology of Polis Chrysochous, Cyprus : [Exhibition, Princeton University Art Museum, Princeton, October 20, 2012-January 20, 2013], edited by William A.P. Childs, Joanna S. Smith and J. Michael #Padgett, Princeton, N.J. : Princeton University Art Museum : Distributed by Yale University Press, cop. 2012. - 359 p.ISBN 978-0-300-17439-7 (br). - ISBN 0-300-17439-X (br).
2. "In memory of Professor Erik Sjöqvist (1903-1975) member of the Swedish Cyprus Expedition (1927-1931) and professor of art and archaeology, Princeton University (1951-1969)".
