= San Giovenale =

Archaeological site in Blera, Italy

Coordinates: 42°13′28″N 11°59′59″E

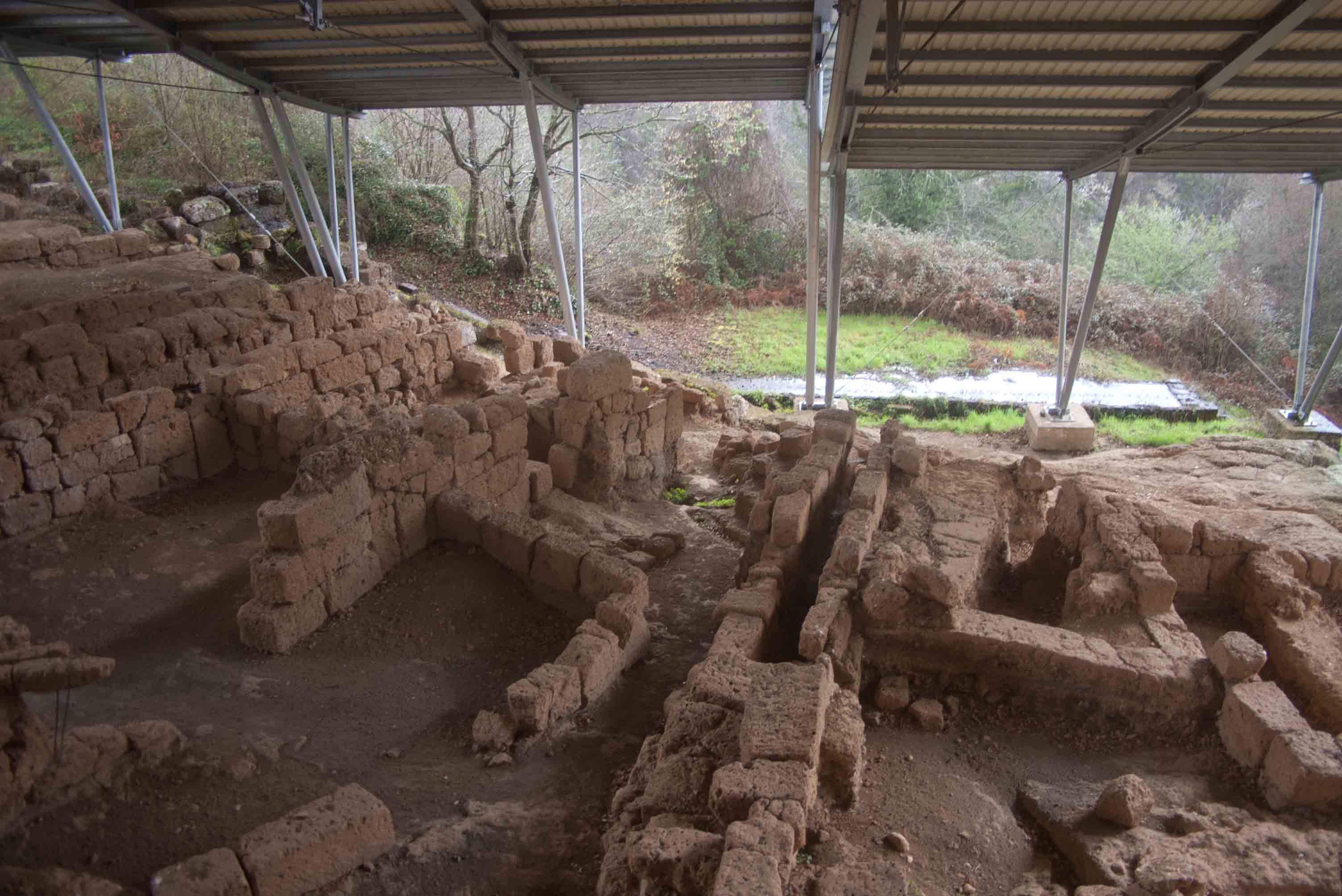
- The Borgo of San Giovenale, with remains of Etruscan houses and workshops.

- Location within Lazio
- Type: Settlement
- Periods: Neolithic period - Roman Republic
- Cultures: Etruscan
- Location: Comune di Blera, Italy
- Region: Lazio

History
- Abandoned: Roman period

Site notes
- Excavation dates: yes
- Archaeologists: Swedish Institute at Rome; Eric Berggren
- Condition: ruined
- Public access: no
- Website: San Giovenale (in Italian)

San Giovenale is the modern name of the location of an ancient Etruscan settlement close to the modern village of Blera, Italy. The main settlement consists of high plateau split in two parts, normally referred to as the Acropolis and the Borgo. The settlement is surrounded by a number of burial sites. The excavations of the settlement were divided into eight areas: Areas A-F on the Acropolis, the Borgo and the Bridge over the Pietrisco.

It was excavated by the Swedish Institute at Rome in the 1950s and 1960s with King Gustaf VI Adolf as one of the participating archaeologists. The excavations at San Giovenale have been, together with the excavations of Acquarossa, the main source of information about how small and medium-size Etruscan settlements were organized. The results of the excavations are published in the series Skrifter utgivna av Svenska Institutet i Rom-4˚ and in the Institute's journal, the Opuscula Romana (until 2007) and the Opuscula (2008-).The finds from the excavations are now partly exhibited in the Etruscan Museum of the Rocca Albornoz in Viterbo.

== Bibliography ==
=== Archaeological reports ===
- Berggren, Eric; Berggren, Kristina (1981). San Giovenale. Vol. II, fasc. 2: The Acropolis (part 1, Area A and B): Excavations in Area B, 1957-1960. Svenska Institutet i Rom. ISBN 978-91-7042-078-8.
- Olinder, Björn; Pohl, Ingrid (1981). San Giovenale. Vol. II, fasc. 4: The Acropolis (part 1, Area A and B): The semi-subterranean building in Area B. Svenska Institutet i Rom. ISBN 978-91-7042-079-5.
- Pohl, Ingrid (2011). San Giovenale. Vol. II, fasc. 5: The Acropolis (part 1, Area A and B): Two cisterns and a well in Area B. Svenska Institutet i Rom. ISBN 978-91-7042-178-5.
- Karlsson, Lars (2006). San Giovenale. Vol. IV, fasc. 1: The Acropolis (part 3, Area F): Area F East. Huts and Houses on the Acropolis. Stockholm: Svenska institutet i Rom. ISBN 91-7042-172-2.
- Nylander, Carl; Blomé, Börje; Karlsson, Lars; Bizzarro, Angela; Tilia, Giuseppe; Tilia, Stefano; Tilia, Alessandro, eds. (2013). San Giovenale. Vol. V, fasc. 1: The Borgo: Excavating an Etruscan quarter. Architecture and stratigraphy. Stockholm: Svenska Institutet i Rom. ISBN 9789170421808.
- Backe Forsberg, Yvonne; Holmgren, Richard (2024). San Giovenale. Vol. VI, fasc. 2-3: The bridge on the Pietrisco. Vignale. The castle and the chapel: What’s beyond the Etruscan bridge? Analysis and dating of the Vignale plateau. Stockholm: Svenska institutet i Rom. ISBN 9789170421884.
- Thordeman, Bengt; Hallert, Bertil (1967). San Giovenale. Vol. VI, fasc. 4-5: The bridge on the Pietrisco. Vignale. The castle and the chapel: The medieval castle of San Giovenale. Terrestrial photogrammetric survey of the San Giovenale castle. Stockholm: Svenska institutet i Rom.

=== Discussions ===
- Barker, Graeme; Rasmussen, Tom (2000). The Etruscans. Malden, Mass.: Blackwell. ISBN 9780631220381.
- Forsberg, S.; Thomasson, B.E., eds. (1984). San Giovenale: materiali e problemi; atti del simposio all'Istituto Svedese di Studi Classici a Roma, 6 aprile 1983. Stockholm: Svenska Inst. i Rom. ISBN 978-91-7042-098-6.
- Backe-Forsberg, Yvonne (2009-12-02). "The Brygos painter at San Giovenale". Opuscula. Annual of the Swedish Institutes at Athens and Rome. 2: 193–203. doi:10.30549/opathrom-02-10.
- Tobin-Dodd, Fredrik (2020-11-02). "Erik Wetter and the genesis of the San Giovenale excavations". Opuscula. Annual of the Swedish Institutes at Athens and Rome. 13: 223–234. doi:10.30549/opathrom-13-09. S2CID 228814320.
