= Norwegian Institute at Athens =

Archaeological institute operating in Athens, Greece

Coordinates: 37.9669°N 23.7269°E

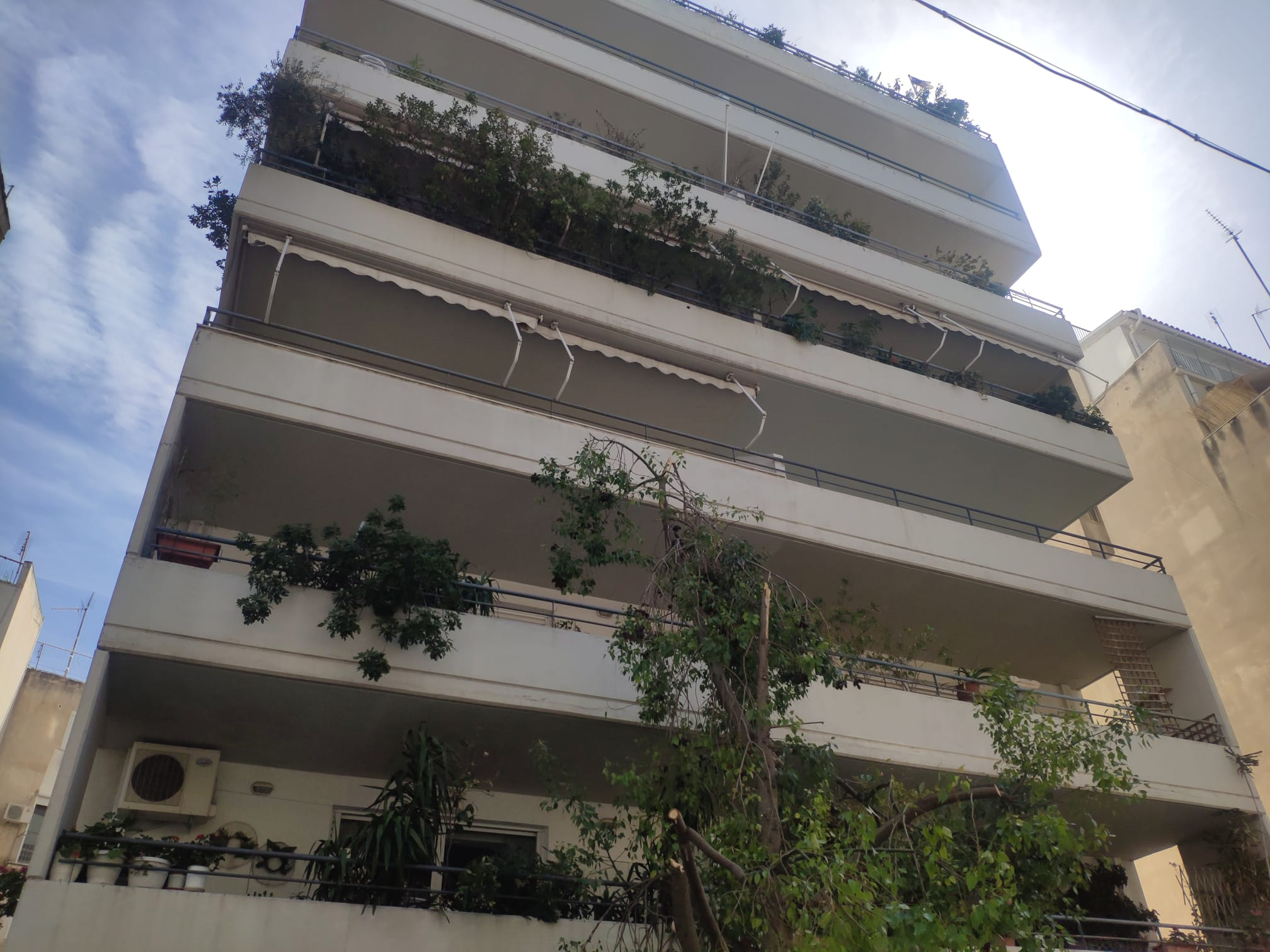

The Norwegian Institute at Athens (Norwegian: Det Norske Institutt I Athen; Greek: Νορβηγικό Ινστιτούτο Αθηνών) is one of the 19 foreign archaeological institutes operating in Athens, Greece.

The Institute aims to promote research in all areas of Greek Studies by Norwegian scholars. It contributes, with its Danish, Finnish and Swedish counterparts, to the Nordic Library at Athens. Its archaeological activities, since its foundation in 1989, include archaeological survey in Arcadia, deep-water archaeological survey in the Northern Sporades and off Ithaca (Ionian Islands), and excavations at Petropigi (Kavala regional unit), and at Tegea (Arcadia) where the city and the sanctuary of Athena Alea are under investigation.

== Bibliography ==
- E. Korka et al. (eds.): Foreign Archaeological Schools in Greece, 160 Years, Athens, Hellenic Ministry of Culture, 2006, p. 126-133.
