= Clemente Marconi =

Italian and American archaeologist (1966–2026)

- Born: January 12, 1966; Rome, Italy
- Died: July 23, 2026 (aged 60); New York City, U.S.
- Known for: Excavations at Selinunte; Research on Greek art and archaeology
- Awards: Accademia Nazionale dei Lincei (member); Academia Europaea (member)

Academic background
- Education: Sapienza University of Rome; Scuola Normale Superiore di Pisa
- Doctoral advisor: Salvatore Settis

Academic work
- Discipline: Archaeology, art history
- Sub-discipline: Ancient Mediterranean art and archaeology
- Institutions: Columbia University; Institute of Fine Arts, New York University; University of Milan

Clemente Marconi (January 12, 1966 – July 23, 2026) was an Italian and American archaeologist and art historian specializing in ancient Mediterranean Art and Archaeology. He held academic appointments both in the United States and in Italy, serving as the James R. McCredie Professor of Greek Art and Archaeology and university professor at the Institute of Fine Arts at New York University and as full professor (professore ordinario) of Classical Archaeology in the Department of Cultural and Environmental Heritage at the University of Milan (Università degli Studi di Milano "La Statale"). Marconi also directed the Institute of Fine Arts–New York University and University of Milan excavations on the acropolis of Selinunte.

== Early life and academic career ==
Marconi was born in Rome, Italy on January 12, 1966. He earned his Bachelor of Arts in Classics and Greek and Roman Art and Archaeology from the University of Rome La Sapienza in 1990. In 1997 he completed his PhD in Classical Art and Archaeology at the Scuola Normale Superiore di Pisa, where he was trained by Salvatore Settis. His academic training emphasized an interdisciplinary approach to the ancient world, blending historical, philological, archaeological, and art historical methodologies.

After earning his PhD at the Scuola Normale Superiore di Pisa, Marconi taught, from 1999 to 2006, Greek Art and Archaeology in the Department of Art History and Archaeology at Columbia University. In 2006, he left Columbia University to join the Institute of Fine Arts at New York University, where he taught Greek Art and Archaeology. In 2010–2011 Marconi was Elizabeth A. Whitehead Professor at the American School of Classical Studies at Athens. Since 2017, he also taught Classical Archaeology at the University of Milan. In 2019, he was visiting professor of the Australian Archaeological Institute at Athens. Beginning in 2006, Marconi directed the Institute of Fine Arts—New York University's excavations at Selinunte. In addition to teaching and fieldwork, Marconi initiated the Seminar on Ancient Art and Archaeology at the Institute of Fine Arts at New York University in 2012. The seminar aims to critically explore new methodologies and theoretical approaches in the study of ancient art and architecture. In 2021 he became a member of the Accademia Nazionale dei Lincei and of the Academia Europaea.

== Research ==
Marconi's research focused on ancient Mediterranean Art and Archaeology. His hermeneutic approach emphasized context and interdisciplinarity, and the integration of different perspectives, from historiography to anthropology, to examine the form, meaning, and social function of images and monuments.

He published books and articles and curated exhibitions on a variety of topics including ancient Greek art and archaeology, Greek settlement in the western Mediterranean; the art and archaeology of ancient Sicily (co-curating the exhibition “Sicily: Art and Invention between Greece and Rome,” held at the J. Paul Getty Museum and the Cleveland Museum of Art in 2013); the history of archeological research in Sicily (such as publishing and commenting on the minutes of the Commissione di Antichità e Belle Arti in Sicilia, and the critical edition of Jacob Ignaz Hittorff’s drawings of ancient Greek and Roman monuments in Sicily); and the modern and contemporary reception of ancient art (including curating the exhibition on “Picasso and Antiquity” held at the National Archaeological Museum, Naples in 2023 and collaborating with Francesco Vezzoli on the exhibition “Teatro Romano” at MoMA PS1 in 2014). Additionally, he was involved in matters concerning cultural property and the repatriation of artifacts to Sicily, like the acroliths and the Goddess from Morgantina.

In addition to editing the Oxford Handbook of Greek and Roman Art and Architecture, Marconi was the editor in chief of The Journal of Ancient Architecture and was a member of the editorial boards of Hephaistos, Prospettiva, the Rendiconti della Classe di Scienze Morali of the Accademia Nazionale dei Lincei, Res: Anthropology and Aesthetics, the Rivista dell’Istituto Nazionale d’Archeologia e Storia dell’Arte, and Sicilia Antiqua.

Beginning in 2006, Marconi directed the Institute of Fine Arts–New York University excavations on the acropolis of Selinunte, one of the most significant sites for Greek and Punic archaeology in Italy. His work at Selinunte, in partnership with the local Archaeological Park and, beginning in 2017, the University of Milan, saw the collaboration of a considerable number of specialists affiliated with many European and American academic and research institutions. His work yielded important discoveries regarding the site's main urban sanctuary and historical development and the archaeology of Greek religion in the Archaic and Classical periods. The finds from Temple R, one of the earliest monumental cult buildings at the site, completely sealed in its Archaic and Classical levels, significantly contributed to the opening, in 2017, of the local museum in the Baglio Florio. Similarly, Marconi’s research on the metopes of Selinunte and the work of the Selinunte project on Temple B in the main urban sanctuary have led to a new display of the finds from Selinunte in the Museo Archeologico Regionale "Antonino Salinas" in Palermo, where he was appointed consultant for the museum’s renovation between 2009 and 2015.

== Death ==
Marconi died in New York City on July 23, 2026, at the age of 60.

== Selected books ==
- C. Marconi. Selinunte: Le metope dell'Heraion (Panini, 1994)
- C. Marconi, ed. Greek Painted Pottery: Images, Contexts, and Controversies (Brill, 2004)
- C. Marconi. Temple Decoration and Cultural Identity in the Archaic Greek World: The Metopes of Selinus (Cambridge University Press, 2007)
- C. Lyons, M. Bennett, and C. Marconi, eds. Sicily: Art and Invention between Greece and Rome (Getty Publications, 2013)
- C. Marconi, ed. The Oxford Handbook of Greek and Roman Art and Architecture (Oxford University Press, 2015)
- A. Bellia and C. Marconi, eds. Musicians in Ancient Coroplastic Art: Iconography, Ritual Contexts, and Functions (Fabrizio Serra, 2016)
- C. Marconi, M. Kiene, and L. Lazzarini. "Sicile Ancienne": Hittorff and the Architecture of Classical Sicily (Universitäts- und Stadtbibliothek Köln, 2017)
- K. G. Bosher, Greek Theater in Ancient Sicily, edited by Edith Hall and Clemente Marconi (Cambridge University Press, 2021)
- C. Marconi, ed. Picasso e l'antico: L'incontro con le opere del Museo Archeologico di Napoli. (Electa, 2023)
- G. Colzani, C. Marconi, and F. Slavazzi, eds. Greek and Roman Small Size Sculpture. (De Gruyter, 2023)
- Angela Bellia, Clemente Marconi. edd. The Routledge Handbook of Music and Dance Performances in the Ancient Mediterranean: An Interpretative Approach (Routledge, 2026). ISBN 978-1-032-11816-1

== Honors ==
- Member of the Accademia Nazionale dei Lincei (since 2021)
- Member of the Academia Europaea (since 2021)
- Visiting Professor: Australian Archaeological Institute at Athens (2019)
- Corresponding member of the German Archaeological Institute (since 2015)
- Elizabeth A. Whitehead Professor, American School of Classical Studies at Athens (2010–2011)
