= Paavo Castrén =

Finnish classical philologist (born 1938)

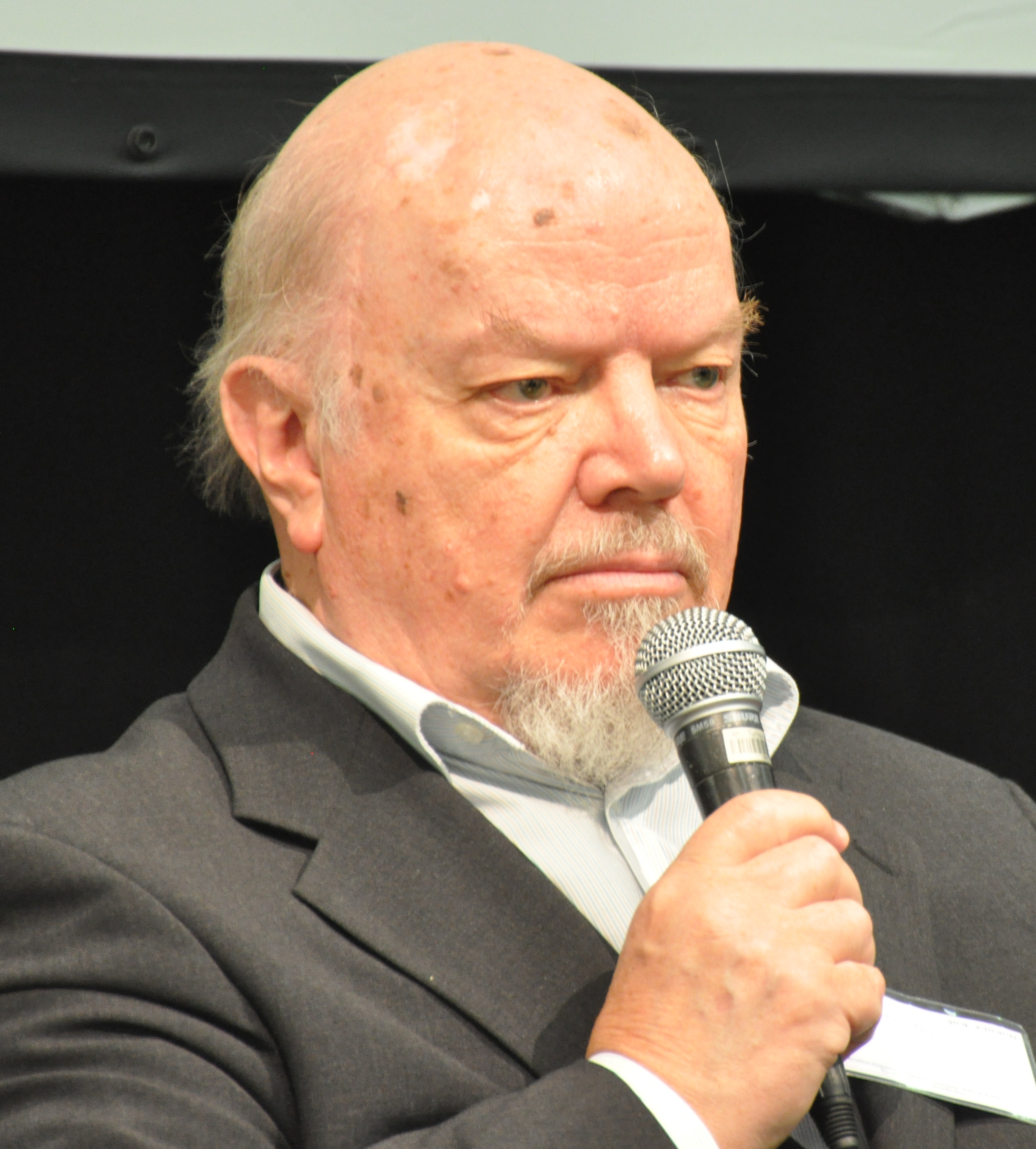
Paavo Castrén at the Turku Book Fair in 2011.

Paavo Sakari Castrén (born 1938 in Pielavesi) is a professor emeritus of classical philology at the University of Helsinki. He is one of the leading Finnish scholars of Pompeii.

Castré's research has focused on Latin epigraphy, Roman and Pompeiian Social history, and Roman and Athenian late antiquity. In addition to writing for academic publications, Castrén has published a large volume of work aimed at the general public. For his book Pompejilaisia kohtaoita, published by Otava, he received the Lauri Jänti prize for nonfiction in 2007. Suomen tietokirjailijat ry, an organization of Finnish nonfiction writers, gave Castrén the Nonfiction Writer's Award in 2011. Castrén has, in addition to teaching at the University of Helsinki, lectured at many public events.

Castrén graduated with a PhD in 1975. He was the first leader of the Finnish Institute at Athens from 1984 to 1988. Paavo Castrén was named a professor on the first of August 1998.

== Popular works ==
- Castrén, Paavo & Pietilä-Castrén, Leena (1982). Rooma. Matkailijan opas. Helsinki: Gaudeamus. ISBN 951-662-399-9.
- Maassa maan tavalla. Eurooppalaisen tapakulttuurin juurilla. Helsinki: WSOY. 1995. ISBN 951-0-20060-3.
- Pompejilaisia kohtaloita. Helsinki: Otava. 2006. ISBN 951-1-18929-8.
- Uusi antiikin historia. Helsinki: Otava. 2011. ISBN 978-951-1-21594-3.
- Homeros: Troijan sota ja Odysseuksen harharetket. Helsinki: Otava, 2016. ISBN 9789511296324.
- Antiikin myytit. Helsinki: Otava, 2017. ISBN 9789511281214.
