= Danish Institute at Athens =

Danish archaeological institute in Greece

Coordinates: 37°58′16″N 23°43′50″E

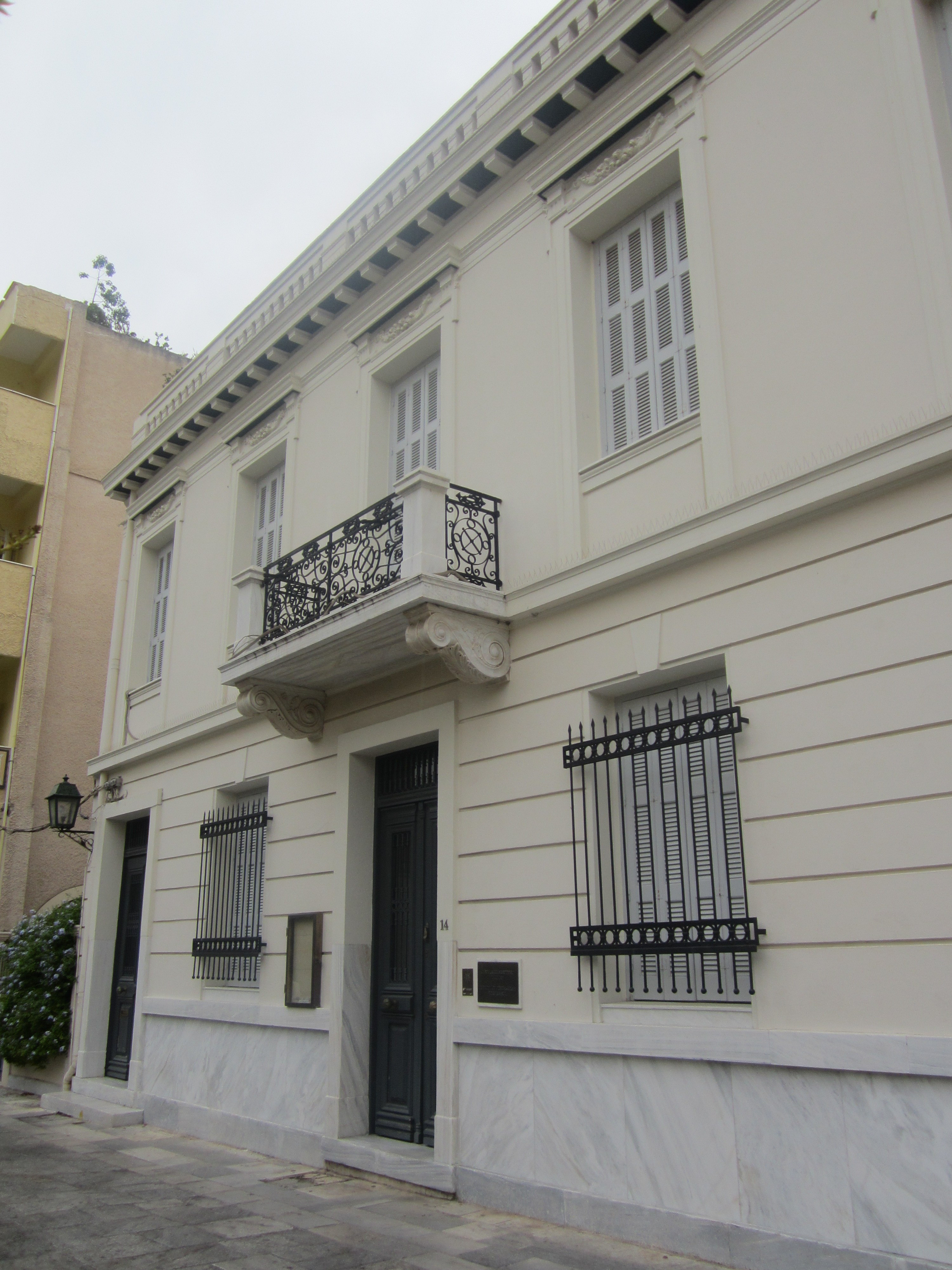

The Danish Institute at Athens (Danish: Det Danske Institut I Athen; Greek: Ινστιτούτο της Δανίας στην Αθήνα) is one of the 19 foreign archaeological institutes operating in Athens, Greece.

Founded in 1992, the Danish Institute focuses on archaeological research in Greece, but also operates as a cultural institute, with a programme of exhibitions and concerts. It is a contributor (with its Finnish, Norwegian and Swedish counterparts) to the Nordic Library at Athens. It is involved in archaeological fieldwork at Calydon and Kato Vassiliki (Aetolia), as well as Zea Harbour (Piraeus, Athens).

== Bibliography ==
- E. Korka et al. (eds.): Foreign Archaeological Schools in Greece, 160 Years, Athens, Hellenic Ministry of Culture, 2006, p. 90-95.
