= Zea Harbour Project =

Archaeological project in Greece

Zea Harbour Project is a Danish-Greek archaeological project in Piraeus, Greece. The project began in 2002 under the auspices of the Danish Institute at Athens and is directed by Bjørn Lovén, Associate Fellow in Maritime Archaeology at the University of Southern Denmark. The Zea Harbour Project's goal is to excavate and investigate ancient Athenian naval bases and their fortifications. The Zea Harbour Project aims to recover the Athenian fleet of triremes believed to be located in the ancient harbors of Zea and Munichia, in Piraeus, Athens, Greece.

The last excavation conducted by the Zea Harbour Project began on December 9, 2012
