= Canadian Institute in Greece =

Foreign archaeological institute operating in Greece

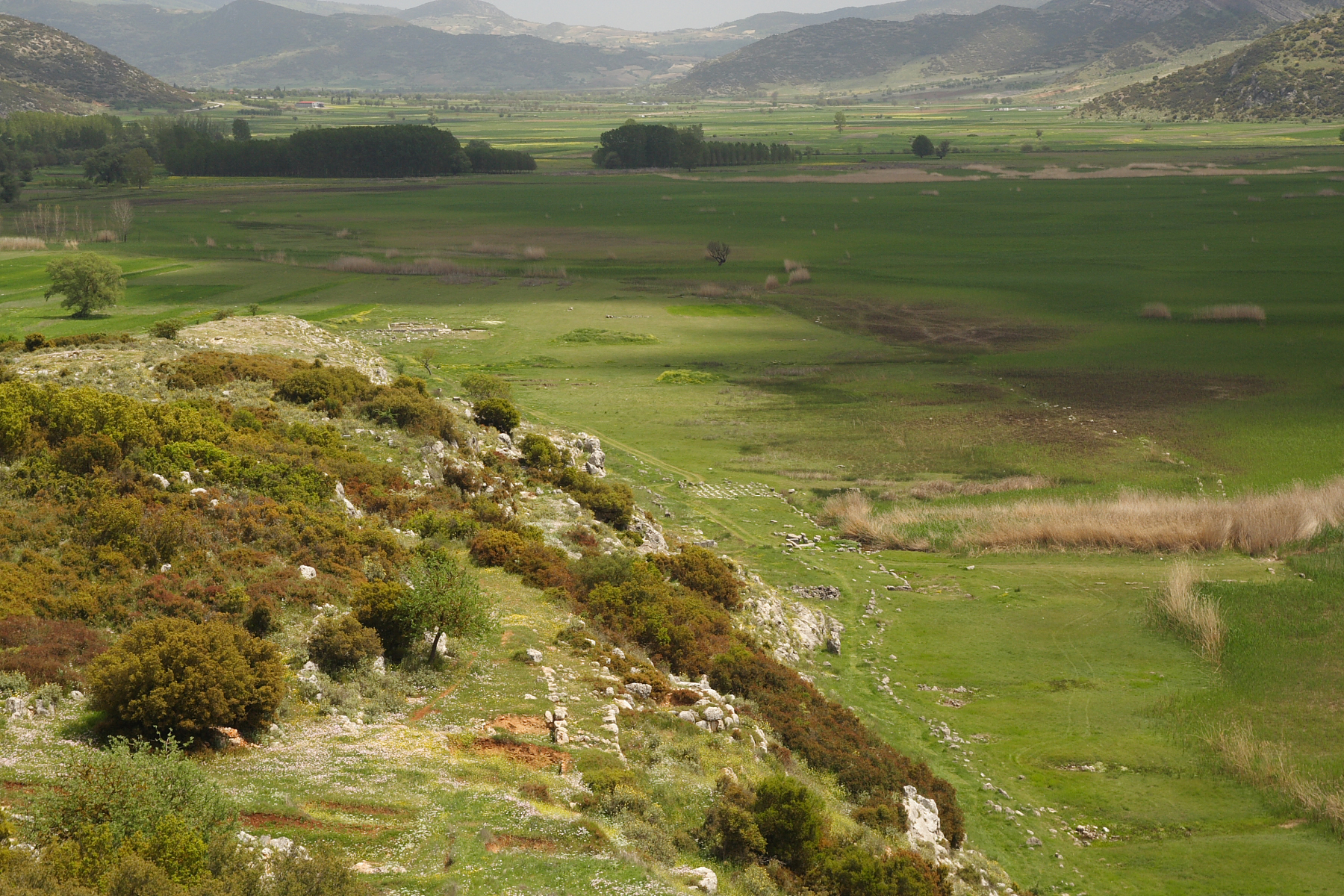
A view over the Canadian excavations at Stymphalos

The Canadian Institute in Greece (CIG) (French: Institut Canadien en Grèce (ICG); Greek: Καναδικό Ινστιτούτο στην Ελλάδα) is one of the 19 foreign archaeological institutes operating in Athens, Greece.

== General information, services, activities, facilities ==
The CIG/ICG has been recognised by the Greek state since 1976 (originally as the Canadian Archaeological Institute at Athens). It aims to promote and assist Canadian scholars in all areas of Greek studies. To further this aim, it runs a regular lecture series at Athens, operates a programme of internships to enable Canadian students to work in Greece, and runs a sizeable library (currently 5,000 volumes).

== Archaeological fieldwork ==
The CIG/ICG has been involved in a variety of archaeological projects across Greece, including Argilos (Greek Macedonia), the Persian War Shipwreck Survey (off Athos, Thessaly and Euboia), at Mytilene (Lesbos), Kastro-Kallithea (Thessaly), Khostia, Eleon, and Tanagra (Boeotia), the Southern Euboia Survey, at Stymphalos and Zaraka Monastery (Corinthia), at Kiapha Thiti (Attica), and on Crete at Kamares Cave and the Sphakia survey.

== Staff ==
- Director: Jacques Y. Perreault, Université de Montréal
- Assistant Director: Jonathan Tomlinson
- Cultural Program Manager: Zoe Delibasis

== Bibliography ==
- E. Korka et al. (eds.): Foreign Archaeological Schools in Greece, 160 Years, Athens, Hellenic Ministry of Culture, 2006, p. 116-125.
