= Belgian School at Athens =

Archaeological institute in Athens, Greece

Coordinates: 37.9687°N 23.7307°E

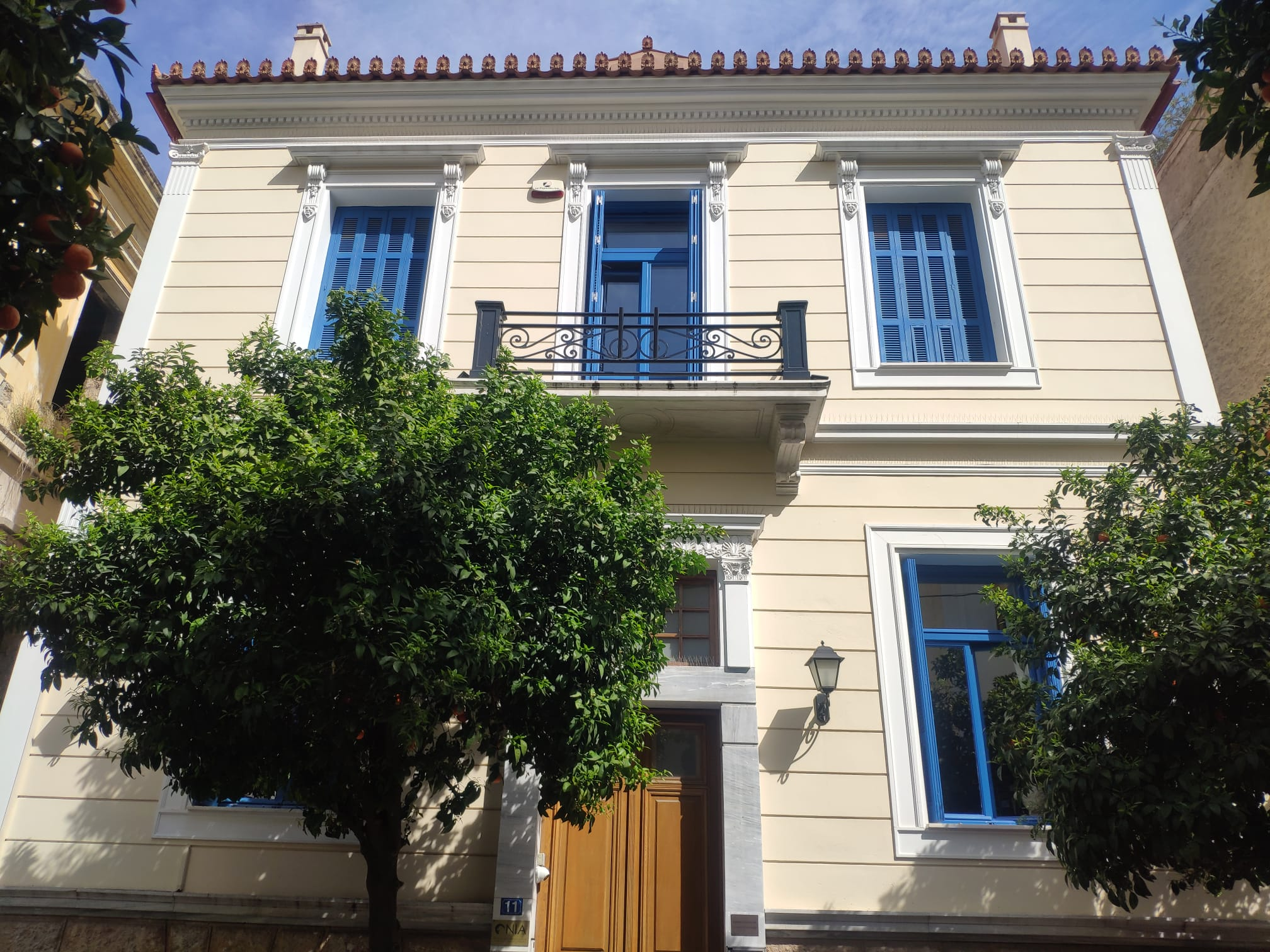

The Belgian School at Athens; (Dutch: Belgische School te Athene; French: École Belge d'Athènes; Greek: Βελγική Σχολή Αθηνών) is one of the 19 foreign archaeological institutes operating in Athens, Greece.

The Belgian School was officially accredited in 1985, although Belgian archaeological activity in Greece goes back to the 1960s. It has been associated with the excavations at Thorikos (Attica) for a long time. Since 2007, it is also involved in an excavation at Sisi (Crete).

== Bibliography ==
- E. Korka et al. (eds.): Foreign Archaeological Schools in Greece, 160 Years, Athens, Hellenic Ministry of Culture, 2006, p. 48-51.
