= List of Foreign Archaeological Institutes in Greece =

Foreign Archaeological Institutes Greek: Ξένες Αρχαιολογικές Σχολές
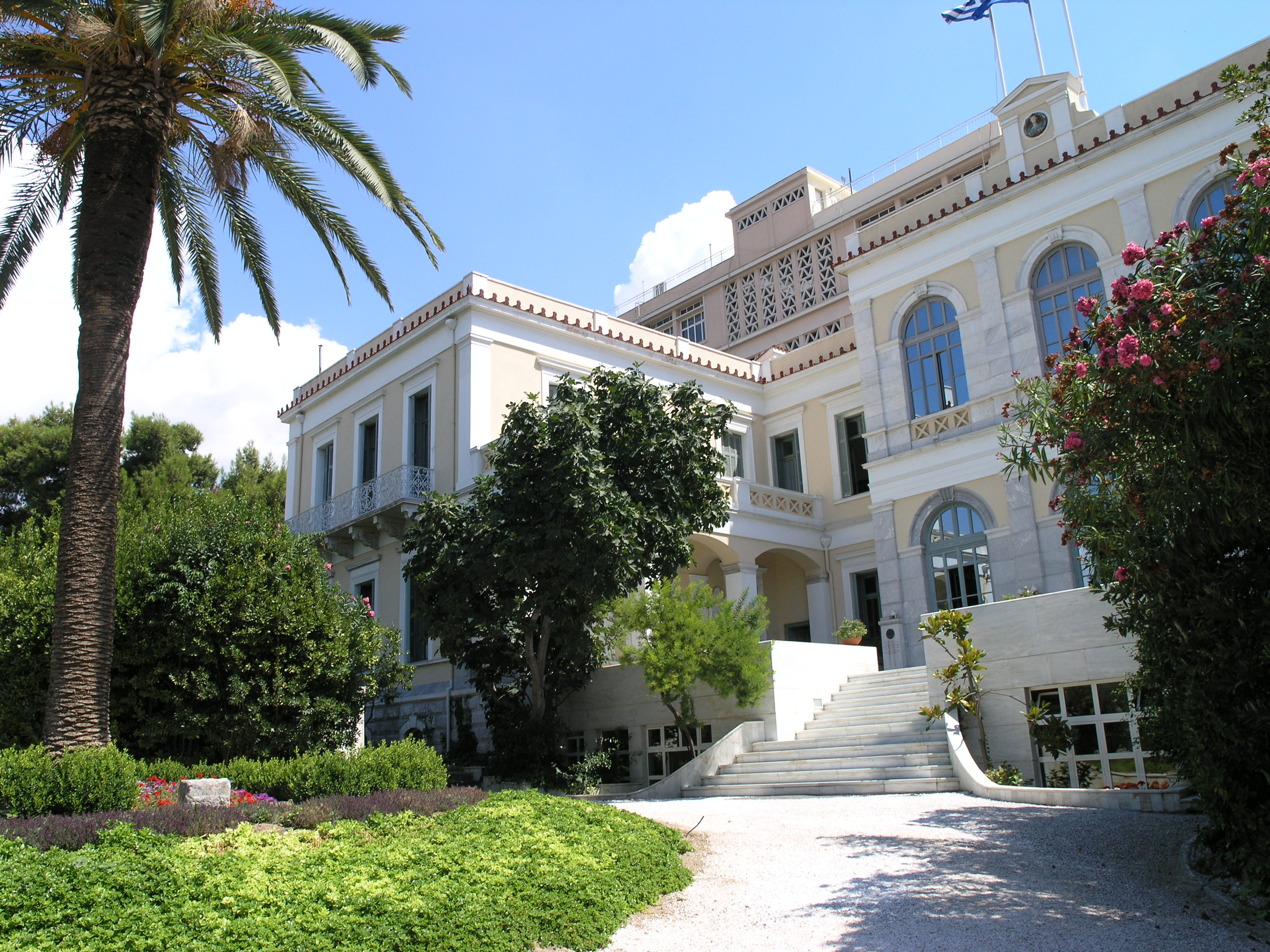
- The present quarters of the French School at Athens, the first of the Foreign Archaeological Schools.
- Founder: Foundation committees in the various nations
- Established: 1846 – 1989
- Mission: To research, document, and preserve Hellenic cultural objects in Greece, especially antiquities, and especially employing the method of archaeological excavation.
- Focus: Compliance with Hellenic Law No. 3028/2002 and all associated governmental orders and policies
- Chair: The chair of the Board of Trustees in various languages. The Board meets periodically to make final authorizations and decide strategic policy
- "Director" in various languages: The person elected or appointed to authorize and direct daily operations from the top of the administrative hierarchy
- Budget: Comes from endowments, contributions, fees, and funding by the various foreign governments or universities.
- Owner: Various owners according to the national laws and the chosen structures. They are all equally recognized in Hellenic law as non-profit organizations.
- Location: Athens, Hellenic Republic

There are 20 Foreign Archaeological Institutes in Greece, also known as "schools," all based in Athens. Seventeen of them are officially accredited. In addition to conducting their share of government-authorized research projects, they issue reports and other publications, support specialised archaeological/classical libraries, conduct regular lecture programmes, award scholarships/bursaries and provide accommodation for a fee. They do not offer degrees, nor are their courses part of any regular, graduate curriculum.

The "students" are not regular students as they are known in the countries of initiation; in fact, some schools, such as the British School, now avoid the term, in favor of "member." The members, or students, are often already degreed professionals in archaeology or related fields. They take courses to prepare themselves for the research conducted by the school, which is typically archaeological. Undergraduate or graduate students present are enrolled in degree programs in their own countries.

The "foreign archaeological schools" are research institutes. Some have associated laboratories. Some of the institutes also maintain specific site facilities or study centres outside Athens. Additionally there is one separate foreign-run Archaeological library in Athens, as well as one foreign research institution elsewhere in Greece.

== Compliance with Greek Law 3028/2002 ==
From the Greek point of view, the foreign archaeological schools exist to assist in the professional recovery and protection of overwhelming numbers of antiquities within the country. In the 19th century, the Greek cultural establishment was desperate for any professional assistance they could obtain. They found it in the zeal of like-minded classicists of the other nations of Europe, who founded the initial foreign archaeological schools. These archaeologists and schools excavated places such as Delphi, Olympia, Mycenae, Knossos, and Troy in Turkey. There was little restriction on the removal of antiquities from the country, or on their private ownership. Permits were relatively easy to obtain.

Today, the Hellenic Republic has a much higher level of control over the processing and preservation of their antiquities and monuments. Greek institutions have come to the fore and Greek archaeologists dominate the culture scene. Archaeological activities are regulated by Hellenic Law No. 3028/2002 "on the Protection of Antiquities and Cultural Heritage in General", passed by the Greek Parliament in 2002, and implemented by the President. It declares all antiquities the property of the state and establishes criminal penalties for mishandling them. A network of archaeological councils is set up over localities and regions of the entire country, which must be advised of the presence of antiquities and consulted as to their disposition. They take precedence over any other consideration. This is the framework into which the foreign archaeological institutes now fit. They must accept oversight and advice from the archaeological councils. Without their accreditation there is no authorization to excavate, survey, or experiment.

Law 3028/2002 labels what English speakers know as an archaeological excavation as "archaeological research in situ". It is defined as "the exploration of the ground, the subsoil, the seabed, or the bed of lakes and rivers for the purpose of locating or discovering ancient monuments ...." These researches are divided into two types. The first is "systematic excavations." These are not undertaken as part of any emergency activity to rescue threatened antiquities, but are assigned to excavating institutions in due process by the Minister of Culture. These institutions can be the Greek Archaeological Service, "domestic ... institutions," or "foreign archaeological missions or schools established in Greece." This is the only type allowed to the foreign schools. The second type, "rescue excavations," is reserved to the Greek Archaeological Service. It may involve intervention in Greek business operations or property ownership."

The law allows to each accredited school "a Maximum of three excavations or other archaeological research per annum." They can have another three in cooperation with the Greek Archaeological Service. "Other archaeological research" applies to the surface, and must be non-destructive. In this category are surface surveys. Permission is required for the use of metal detectors. All permissions are granted by the Minister of Culture. To simplify the procedures and investigations required, the ministry has adopted a policy of only accepting foreign applications that have been processed through the appropriate accredited foreign school.

== Foreign archaeological institutes ("schools") in Athens ==
- (United States) American School of Classical Studies at Athens (ASCSA)
- (Australia) Australian Archaeological Institute at Athens (AAIA)
- (Austria) Austrian Archaeological Institute at Athens (ÖAI Athens)
- (Belgium) Belgian School at Athens (EBSA)
- (United Kingdom) British School at Athens (BSA)
- (Canada) Canadian Institute in Greece (CIG-ICG)
- (China) Chinese School of Classical Studies at Athens (CSCSA)
- (Denmark) Danish Institute at Athens (DIA)
- (Finland) Finnish Institute at Athens (FIA)
- (France) French School at Athens (EfA)
- (Georgia (country)) Georgian Institute at Athens
- (Germany) German Archaeological Institute at Athens (DAI Athens)
- (Republic of Ireland) Irish Institute of Hellenic Studies at Athens (IIHSA)
- (Italy) Italian School of Archaeology at Athens (SAIA)
- Netherlands Institute in Athens (NIA, see below)
- (Norway) Norwegian Institute at Athens (also NIA, see above)
- (Poland) The Polish Archaeological Institute at Athens (PAIA)
- (Romania) Romanian Archaeological Institute in Athens (RAIA)
- (Sweden) Swedish Institute at Athens (SIA)
- (Switzerland) Swiss School of Archaeology in Greece (ESAG/SASG/SEAG)

== Foreign-managed archaeological libraries in Athens ==
- Nordic Library at Athens

== Foreign-managed site facilities or study centres outside Athens ==
- Aigeira (Achaea) – Austrian School
- Corinth (Corinthia) – American School
- Delos (Cyclades) – French School
- Delphi (Phocis) – French School
- Eretria (Euboia) – Swiss School
- Knossos (Crete) – British School
- Malia (Crete) – French School
- Nafplio/Tiryns (Argolid) – German School
- Nafplio (Argolid) – Swedish School
- Olympia (Elis) – German School
- Palaikastro (Crete) – British School
- Phaistos (Crete) – Italian School
- Gortyn (Crete) – Italian School

== Foreign archaeological research institutions based outside Athens ==
- Institute for Aegean Prehistory Study Center for East Crete (INSTAP-SCEG), based in Pacheia Ammos, Crete
