= Nordic Library at Athens =

International archaeological library in Athens, Greece

Coordinates: 37.9682°N 23.7269°E

The Nordic Library at Athens (Greek: Βιβλιοθήκη των Βορείων Χωρών στην Αθήνα) is one of several international archaeological libraries in Athens, Greece. It is located in the Makrigianni area of Athens.

It was established in 1995, as a cooperative venture run by the Danish Institute at Athens, the Finnish Institute at Athens, the Norwegian Institute at Athens and the Swedish Institute at Athens. It currently holds about 40,000 volumes.

== Modern archives ==
The library houses the archives of the Greek-American poet and art historian Nikos Kalamaris, known under the pseudonym Nicolas Calas. The archive of the surrealist artist was handed over in 1999 and includes letters, essays, articles and photographs as well as other material.

In 2005, the library received a donation from Finn Ståhl, a Swedish philhellene and consul in Crete. It included about 250 works related to the Greek poet Constantine P. Cavafy, partly his poetry books, some literature about his work in Greek and other languages.

The archive materials are cataloged and accessible to interested scholars.

== See also ==
- List of Foreign Archaeological Institutes in Greece
- List of libraries in Greece

== Bibliography ==
- E. Korka et al. (eds.): Foreign Archaeological Schools in Greece, 160 Years, Athens, Hellenic Ministry of Culture, 2006, p. 91, 129, 151, 153.
