= Kirsti Simonsuuri =

Finnish professor, writer, poet and researcher (1945–2019)

Kirsti Katariina Simonsuuri (26 December 1945, Helsinki – 29 June 2019, Helsinki) was a Finnish professor, writer, poet, and researcher of ancient literature. Her honors included the J. H. Erkko Award for Best First Book (1980) and the Wolfson Fellowship Award from the British Academy (1981).

== Biography ==
Simonsuuri received her bachelor's degree (1968) and master's degree (1971) from the University of Helsinki. In 1972, she received a second master's degree from the University of Cambridge and five years later, a Ph.D. from the same school.

From 1978–1981, Simonsuuri was a professor of literature at the University of Oulu. In 1981–1982, she was a British Academy Wolfson Fellow at the Warburg Institute. In 1984–1988, she was Fulbright Visiting Scholar at University of California, Los Angeles, Harvard University, and Columbia University. In 1989–1990, she was a visiting scholar at the Centre Louis Gernet; in 1992–1993, she was a scientific fellow at Institute for Advanced Study, Berlin; in 1994, she was a visiting fellow at Magdalen College, Oxford. In 1994–1995, she again served as a professor of literature, this time at the University of Helsinki. From 1995–1998, she was the Director of the Finnish Institute at Athens. In 1998–1999, she worked at the Academy of Finland as a research professor and then served as an academy fellow during the period of 2000 to 2005. She returned to the Institute for Advanced Study, Berlin, in 2001 as a Scientific Fellow. In 2006–2007, she was a Fellow at the Swedish Collegium for Advanced Study in Uppsala, Sweden.

== Partial works ==
=== Non-fiction books and essays ===
- Homer's original genius: eighteenth-century notions of the early Greek epic (1688–1798). 1979. Cambridge University Press. Cambridge. ISBN 0-521-22198-6.
- Nopanheittäjä. 1989. Kirjayhtymä. Helsinki. ISBN 951-26-3346-9.
- Ihmiset ja jumalat: myytit ja mytologiat. 1994. Kirjayhtymä. Helsinki. ISBN 951-26-3944-0.
- Akropolis. 1999. Tammi. Helsinki. ISBN 951-31-1623-9.

=== Poetry collections ===
- Murattikaide. 1980. Kirjayhtymä. Helsinki. ISBN 951-26-2004-9.
- Tuntematon tekijä. 1982. Kirjayhtymä. Helsinki. ISBN 951-26-2259-9.
- Euroopan ryöstö. 1984. Kirjayhtymä. Helsinki. ISBN 951-26-2601-2.
- Meri, ei mikään maa. 1987. Kirjayhtymä. Helsinki. ISBN 951-26-3116-4.
- Enkelten pysäkki. 1990. Kirjayhtymä. Helsinki. ISBN 951-26-2720-5.
- Onni ja barbaria. 1995. Kirjayhtymä. Helsinki. ISBN 951-26-4071-6.
- Rakkaus tuli kun lähdin maan ääriin. 2000. Tammi. Helsinki. ISBN 951-31-1863-0.
- Taivaanrannan ajuri. Valitut runot. 2005. Tammi. Helsinki. ISBN 951-31-3402-4.

=== Prose ===
- Pohjoinen yökirja. 1981. Kirjayhtymä. Helsinki. ISBN 951-26-2176-2.
- Paholaispoika. 1986. Kirjayhtymä. Helsinki. ISBN 951-26-2822-8.
- Miehen muotokuva. 1992. Kirjayhtymä. Helsinki. ISBN 951-26-3752-9.
- Eläintarhanhuvila yhdeksän. 2002. Tammi. Helsinki. ISBN 951-31-2617-X.

=== Translations ===
- Virginia Woolf: Oma huone. 1980. Kirjayhtymä. Helsinki. ISBN 951-26-1830-3.
- Sylvia Plath: Ariel. 1983. Kirjayhtymä. Helsinki. ISBN 951-26-2430-3.
- Virginia Woolf: Orlando. 1984. Kirjayhtymä. Helsinki. ISBN 951-26-2563-6.
- Euripides: Medeia. 1999. Lasipalatsi. Helsinki. ISBN 951-9351-03-5.
- Aiskhylos: Oresteia. 2003. Tammi. Helsinki. ISBN 951-31-2682-X.
- William Shakespeare: Sonetit
- Virginia Woolf: Jaakobin huone. 2008. Tammi. Helsinki. ISBN 978-951-31-4069-4.
- William Shakespeare: Miten haluatte|Kuten haluatte. 2010. WSOY. Helsinki. ISBN 978-951-0-35614-2.

=== Anthologies ===
- Enchanting Beasts. An anthology of modern women poets of Finland. 1990. Forest Books. Lontoo. ISBN 0-948259-68-X.
