= Paliochora =

Village in Kythira, Greece

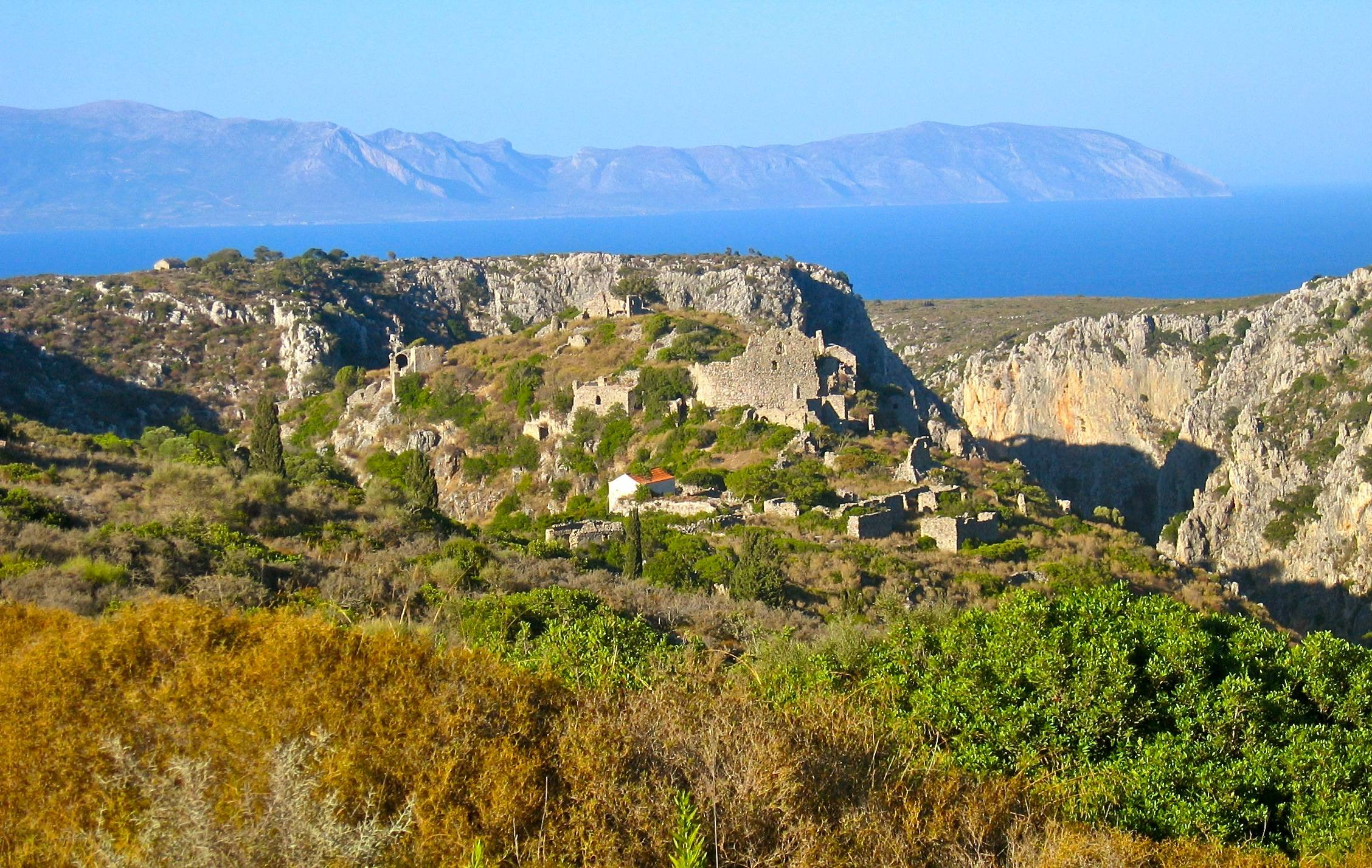
Ruins of Paliochora

Paliochora, known by its contemporaries as Agios Dimitrios, was a village of approximately eight-hundred on the island of Kythira in southern Greece. The village was the first major settlement on the island since antiquity, and was sacked by the Ottoman Fleet Admiral Hayreddin Barbarossa in 1537. The fall of the village was a significant turning point in Kythirian history, and remains one of the island’s preeminent folktales.

== Geography ==
The remote location, rough terrain, harsh weather, and seemingly continuous attacks by pirates had left the island of Kythira without infrastructure or administration until modern times. Any coalescence of peoples anywhere on the island had quickly resulted in a pirate raid, which subsequently led the island’s inhabitants back to their dispersed grazing fields. Although evidence exists of a major settlement during antiquity at the village of Paleopoli, Agios Dimitrios was the only major exception to this lack of civilization. The village was located in the fork of two canyons where a strategic stronghold could be erected. Most importantly however, the ‘island’ stronghold between the two canyons was significantly lower than the surrounding cliffs. This hid the village from anyone who did not come directly to it.

== History ==
The official founding of Agios Dimitrios is unknown. Accounts indicate some of its original founders were present at the time of the village’s destruction, placing its foundation sometime in the mid fifteenth century. Since the Kythirians kept the location of Agios Dimitrios secret and its strategic location ensured a strong defense against any pirates, the island quickly grew economically and in population. By the 1530s, the population had reached 800 (more than any town on the island even today), fifteen churches, and twenty priests.

The growing wealth of the island did not remain a secret for long, and its success eventually attracted the Ottoman Fleet Admiral Hayreddin Barbarossa in 1537 as pressed his campaign against the Venetians around the Peloponnesus. Two accounts exist describing his discovery of the village: 1) Upon landing on Kythira, he captured a number of locals and executed them one by one until someone gave him the location of Agios Dimitrios. 2) Although the town was almost completely concealed to the rest of the island, the highest point of the village was visible from the sea a distance no closer than approximately 10 kilometers due east. The most popular theory is that Barbarossa intended on bypassing the island until he rounded Cape Malea (the southernmost tip of the Peloponnese), putting him in the ideal position to see the town through his scope.

The inhabitants of the island crowded into Agios Dimitrios, however the defenses of the village were not designed against the cannons used by Barbarossa. The Ottomans bombarded the town from the higher surrounding cliffs, and were able to quickly push into the village. At this point the battle turned against the Ottomans, who suffered heavy losses in close-quarter combat with the locals; though they eventually brought the Greeks to submission. Only the men of the village remained to fight, while the women, children, and bishop took refuge in a nearby cave. Tales of Paliochora indicate the location of the cave was never given to Barbarossa, who left quickly after the village had been sacked.

The island remote location and subsequent lack of a substantial population or economy led major powers to neglect it in coming centuries. At the turn of the eighteenth century the island was claimed by France, followed by Russia, Britain, and finally Greece in 1864.

== Sources ==
The remnants of Paliochora along with the folktales from the island of Kythira play into the history of Hayreddin Barbarossa. The history described from this article is primarily based on George Koksma's account provided by Anastasia Conomos Condas.

== See also ==
- Kythira
- Australian Archaeological Institute at Athens
