= Netherlands Institute in Athens =

Archaeological institute operating in Athens, Greece

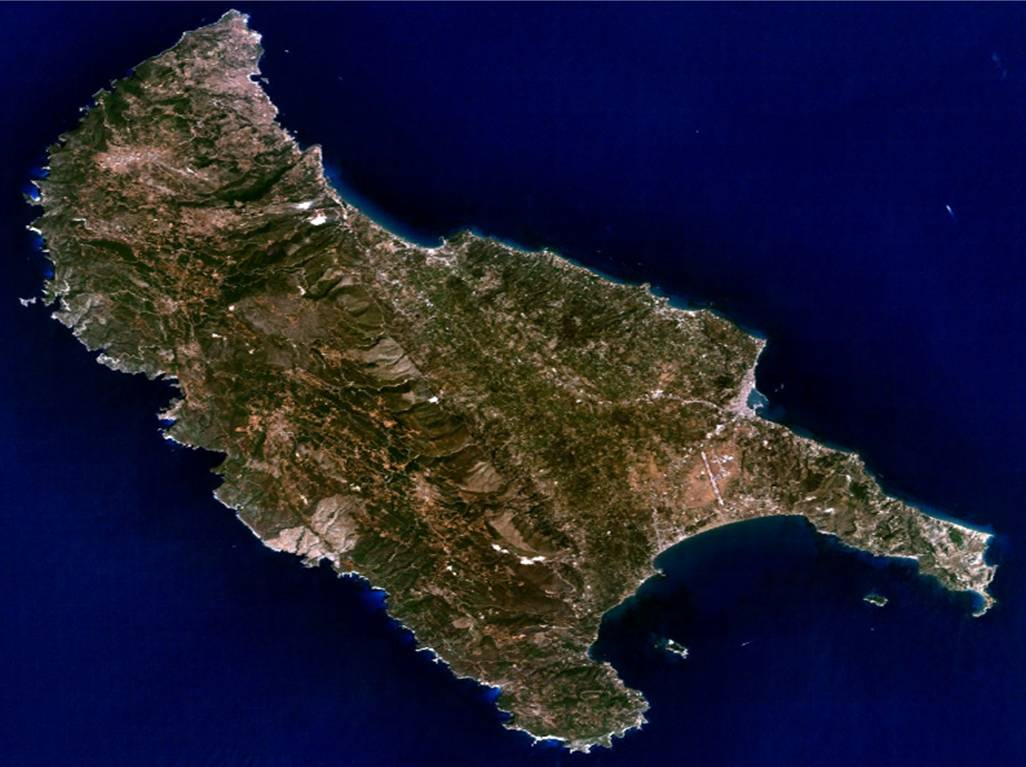
The Netherlands Institute is involved in a survey of Zakynthos

The Netherlands Institute at Athens (NIA) (Dutch: Het Nederlands Instituut Athene; Greek: Ολλανδικό Ινστιτούτο Αθηνών) is one of the 19 foreign archaeological institutes operating in Athens, Greece.

The Institute aims to promote and support Dutch scholars of all academic disciplines active in Greece. To achieve this, the Institute organizes courses, lectures, conferences, maintains a program of study grants and provides students and scholars with lodgings and the necessary study permits. The institute also gives information to Greek students wishing to study in the Netherlands, and occasionally organises exhibitions. The 'Writer's house' program fell victim to the culture budget cuts under the Rutte 1 cabinet; the Institute now hosts a Journalist in Residence for two months a year in cooperation with the Fonds Bijzondere Journalistieke Projecten.

Since its foundation in 1984, the institute has been involved in multiple archaeological projects, such as a survey in Aetolia and excavations at Theissoa-Lavda (Arcadia), and Nicopolis (Epirus). Current activities include excavations at New Halos (Thessaly), Geraki (Laconia), and survey at Tanagra (Boeotia) and on Zakynthos.

Since 1999, the institute is housed in a neoclassical building at Makri 11, at walking distance from the Acropolis.

== Bibliography ==
- E. Korka et al. (eds.): Foreign Archaeological Schools in Greece, 160 Years, Athens, Hellenic Ministry of Culture, 2006, p. 134-143.
