= Georgian Institute at Athens =

Archaeological institute operating in Athens, Greece

The Georgian Institute at Athens (Greek: Γεωργιανό Ινστιτούτο Αθηνών) is one of the 19 foreign archaeological institutes operating in Athens, Greece.

It is the first Georgian academic and cultural institution abroad. The Greek state recognised it in 1998 as a Foreign Archaeological Institute, but the Institute's interests and activities encompass all aspects of scientific and cultural exchange between Greece and the nation of Georgia.

== Bibliography ==
- E. Korka et al. (eds.): Foreign Archaeological Schools in Greece, 2006, p. 86-89.
