= August Myhrberg =

Finnish-Swedish military officer and revolutionary

August Maximilian Myhrberg
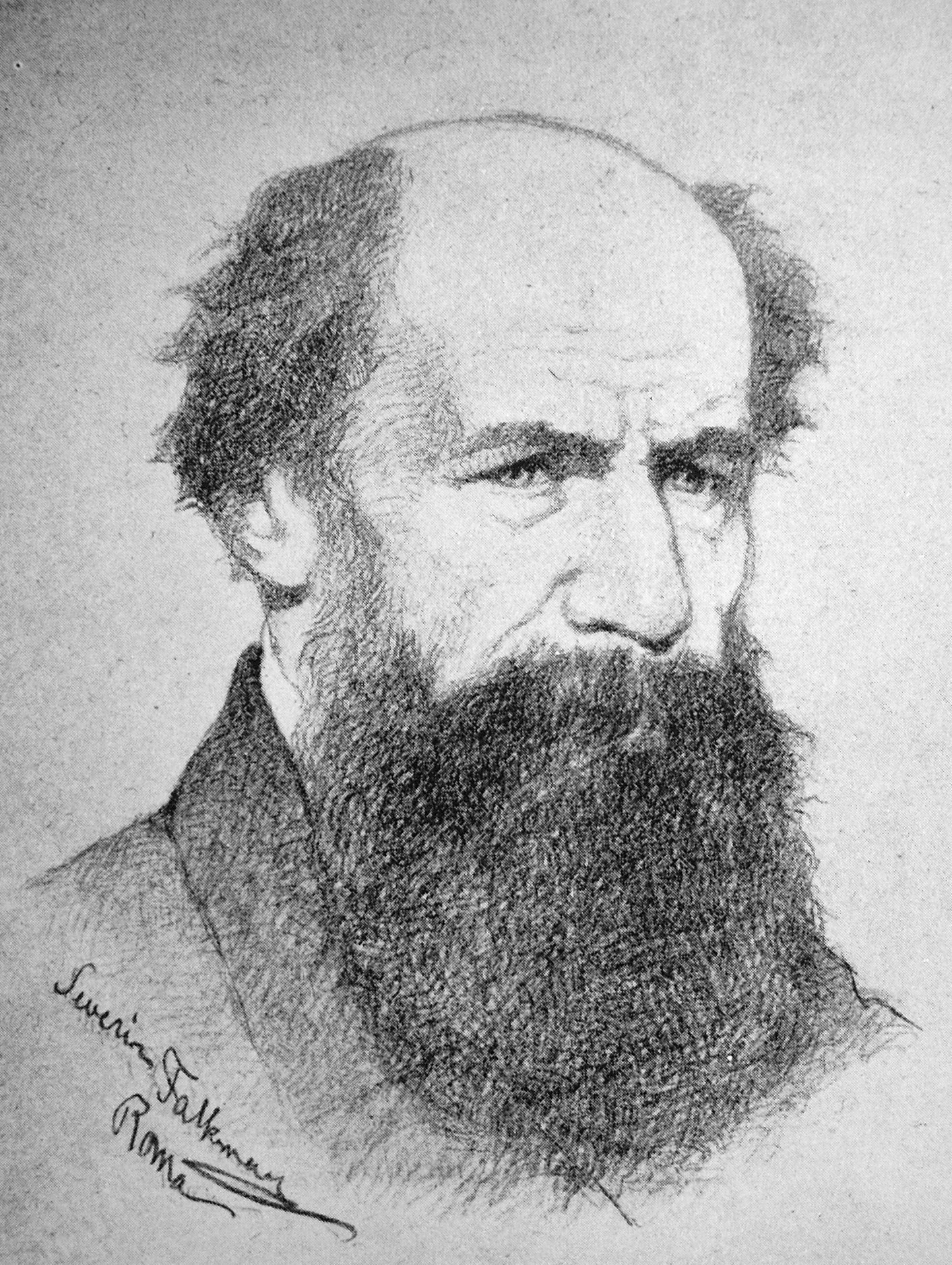
- 1863 pencil drawing of Myhrberg by Severin Falkman
- Born: Matts August Myhrberg; 24 July 1797; Raahe, Kingdom of Sweden
- Died: 31 March 1867 (aged 69) Stockholm, Kingdom of Sweden
- Allegiance: Kingdom of Sweden; First Hellenic Republic (1825–1831); Congress Poland (1831)
- Service years: 1823–1848
- Rank: Major
- Commands: Fortress of Palamidi
- Conflicts: Hundred Thousand Sons of Saint Louis; Greek War of Independence: Siege of the Acropolis; Battle of Phaleron; Chios expedition November Uprising

August Maximilian Myhrberg (24 July 1797 – 31 March 1867) was a Finnish-Swedish military officer and revolutionary. After abandoning his studies at the Uppsala University, he pursued a military career by supporting the liberals in the Hundred Thousand Sons of Saint Louis revolution, the Greeks in the Greek War of Independence and the Polish rebels in the November Uprising. His adventures were mythologized in his native Sweden and his persona was idealized by late 19th century Finnish nationalists.

== Early life ==
August Maximilian Myhrberg was born as Matts August Myhrberg on 24 July 1797 in Raahe, Finland, then part of Kingdom of Sweden. His father Anders Gustaf Myhrberg was a Swedish-born merchant and Captain in the Swedish Army who later became a customs official. His mother Christina belonged to a Finnish bourgeois family from Oulu. The family spoke Finnish at home. Following the Russian annexation of Finland in the aftermath of the Finnish War, the Myhrberg family moved to Karlshamn and later to Härnösand. Having completed primary school in Raahe, Myhrberg was sent to Uppsala to continue his studies at a boarding school. In June 1815, he enrolled into the Uppsala University, where he cultivated his interest in history and Greek mythology. In 1818, he became acquainted with visiting associate professor Adolf Ivar Arwidsson, frequenting opposition circles connected to him. In 1820, he abandoned his studies, to complete his military service. An admirer of Napoléon Bonaparte, Myhrberg aspired to participate in the revolutionary wave that swept Europe.

== Military career ==
Upon his father's death in 1823, he travelled to Spain where he briefly fought in the liberal uprising against the absolutist rule of Ferdinand VII; before being taken prisoner by the French army. In 1825, he was among a group of volunteers recruited by Colonel Charles Fabvier in Marseille to fight in the Greek War of Independence. He arrived in Nauplion in 1825, initially serving in Colonel Auguste Regnaud de Saint-Jean d'Angély’s cavalry as a Trooper. Myhrberg took part in the fighting in Euboea in 1826, he then fought in an attempted relief of the Siege of the Acropolis where he was injured. In 1826, he was promoted to lieutenant, later participating in the Battle of Chaidari where he was wounded again. He was wounded in action for the third time in the Battle of Cape Colias, being promoted to captain after its conclusion. In January 1827, Myhrberg became Fabvier's aide-de-camp subsequently serving in the same role for Major General Thomas Gordon and Colonel Carl Wilhelm von Heideck. Myhrberg took part in the Battle of Phaleron and the Chios expedition where he distinguished himself. In 1829, Myhrberg was appointed Commandant of the Palamidi fortress by Ioannis Kapodistrias. Myhrberg left Greece in 1831 in order to participate in the Polish November Uprising; he remained a lifelong supporter of the Greek national cause. Little is known about the period of his life in Poland. According to an anecdotal account by Anders Ramsay, Myhrberg fought at the Battle of Ostrołęka. He was captured by the Russians at some point during the war but managed to escape to neutral Prussia, later settling in France.

== Later life ==
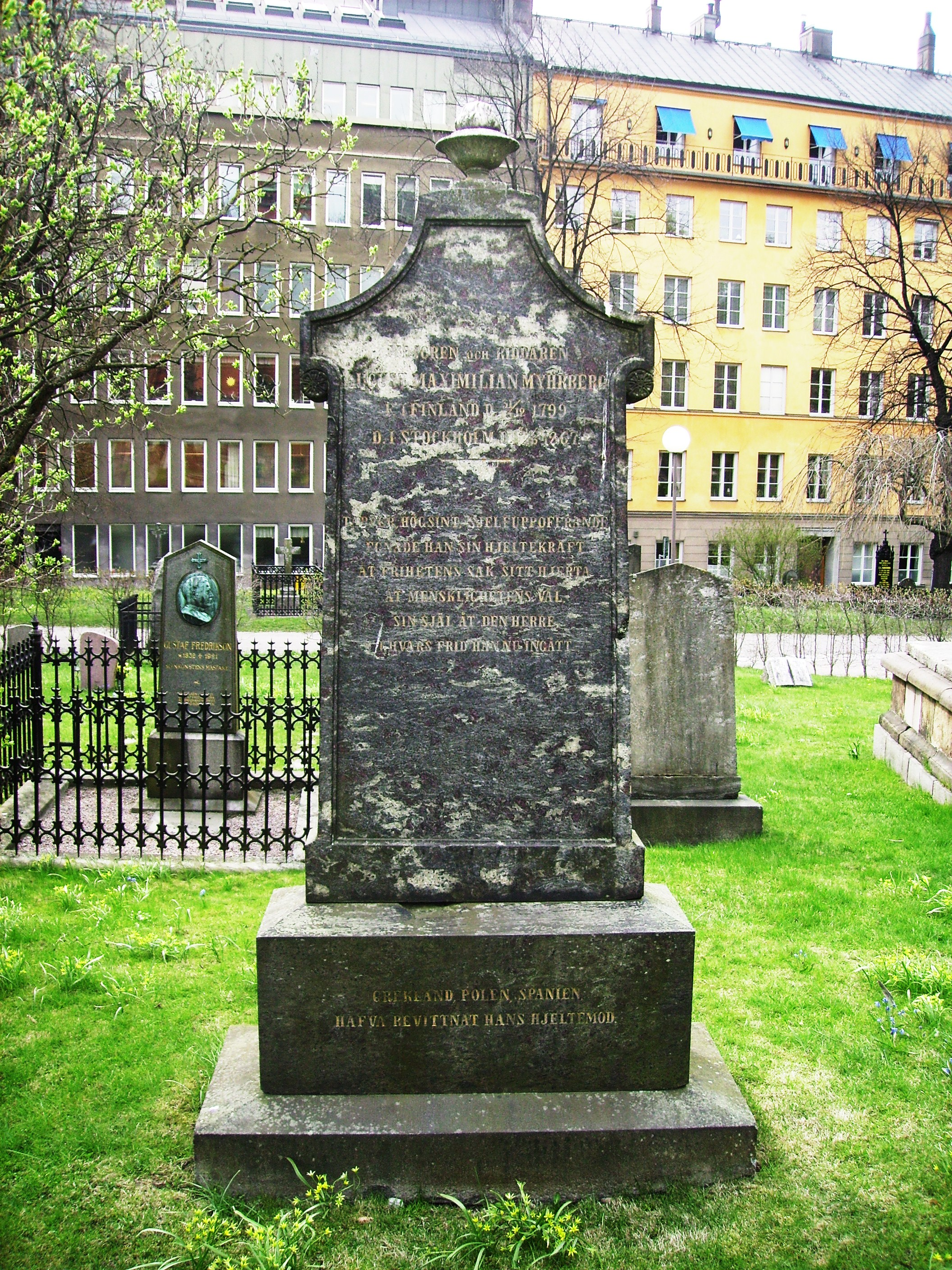
Myhrberg's gravestone

In 1834, he was awarded the Silver Cross of the Order of the Redeemer by King Otto of Greece. In 1836, he visited Thomas Gordon in Scotland. In 1840, he travelled to the Grand Duchy of Finland, visiting friends and relatives. In 1842, he decided to return to Sweden where he was suspected of being a radical revolutionary. Following an audience with King Charles XIV John he was allowed to settle in the country. The king was impressed by Myhrberg's military career, awarding him the title Knight of the Order of the Sword and the rank of major. He went on to serve in the militia protecting the Swedish colony of Saint Barthélemy until 1848 when he returned to Sweden. He served as an advisor for King Oscar I regarding Finnish matters, warning him against intervening in the Crimean War. During the course of the January Uprising, Myhrberg moved to Paris where he socialized with Polish political immigrants. He spent his final years in Stockholm where he died on 31 March 1867; upon his death he was given a state funeral, with full military honours at the Johannes Church graveyard despite never holding office in Sweden.

Myhrberg was greatly admired in Sweden's liberal and radical political circles. His adventures became the subject of numerous often conflicting, rumors and newspaper articles which idealized him as a person. Accounts of Myhrberg's life were written by poet Johan Ludvig Runeberg, philosopher Johan Vilhelm Snellman, poet Fredrik Cygnaeus and writer Zachris Topelius among others. He was elevated into a paragon by Finnish nationalists during the late 19th century. A statue and a park dedicated to Myhrberg can be found in Raahe's old town.
