= Australian Archaeological Institute at Athens =

Foreign archaeological institute in Athens, Greece

Coordinates: 37.9657°N 23.7239°E

The Australian Archaeological Institute at Athens (AAIA) (Greek: Αυστραλιανό Αρχαιολογικό Ινστιτούτο Αθηνών) is one of the seventeen foreign archaeological institutes in Greece. Founded in 1980, it aims to promote Greek studies in Australia, as well as to enable Australian scholars to engage in archaeological fieldwork in Greece. The Institute has been involved in projects in excavations at Torone (Greek Macedonia), Zagora (Andros), and in the Paliochora survey (Kythira).

== The Visiting Professorship ==
Each year the Institute brings to Australia a distinguished academic who undertakes a lecture tour to all Institutional members across the country.

== Hostel in Athens ==
The Australian Archaeological Institute at Athens also runs a Hostel in Athens for visiting Academics and students

== Bibliography ==
- E. Korka et al. (eds.): Foreign Archaeological Schools in Greece, 160 Years, Athens, Hellenic Ministry of Culture, 2006, p. 30–37.
