= Finnish Institute at Athens =

Scientific institute of Finland

The Finnish Institute at Athens
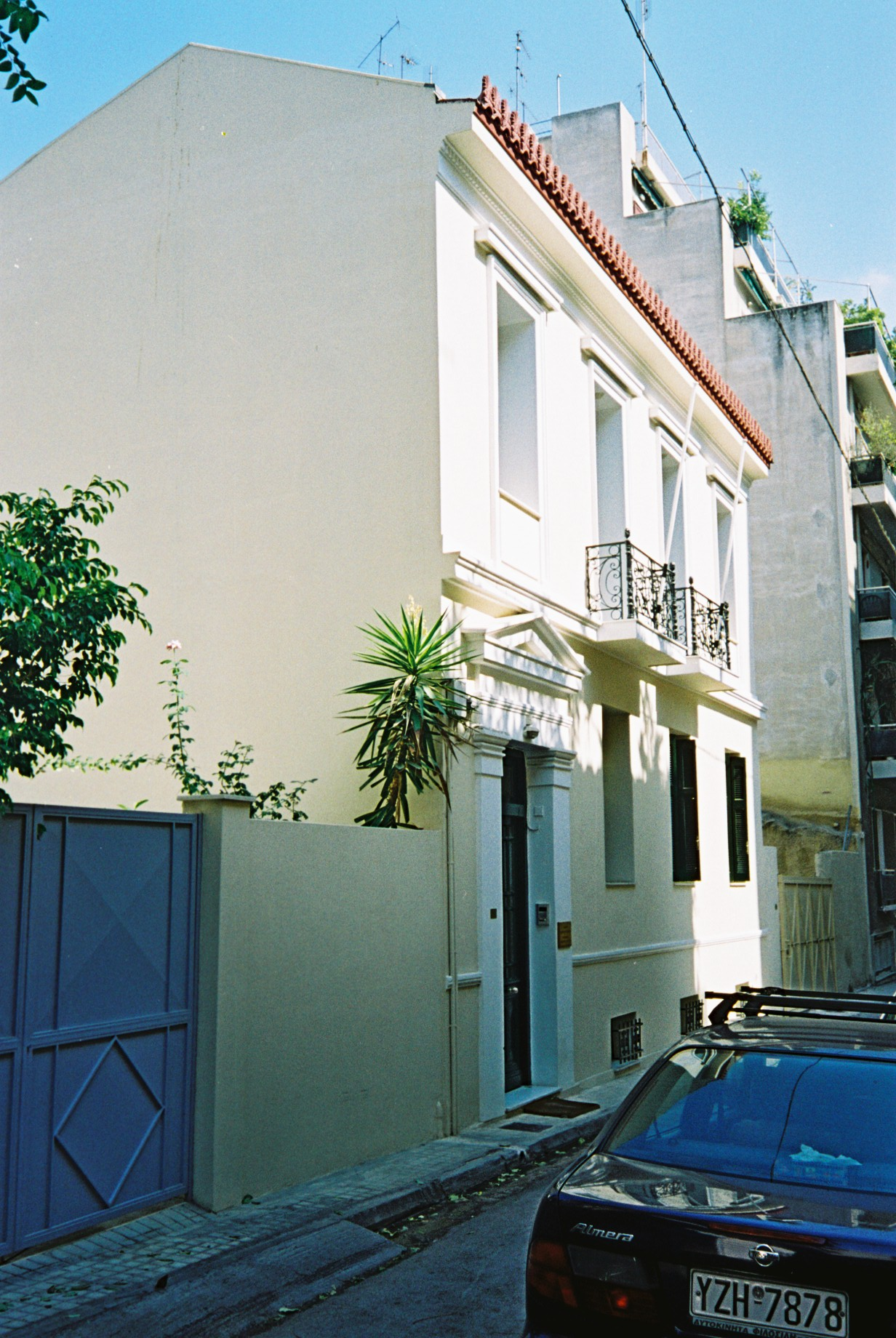
- The building of the Finnish Institute at Athens
- Location: Zítrou 16, Makrygiánni, Athens, Greece
- Coordinates: 37°58′04″N 23°43′37″E
- Type: Scientific and cultural institution
- Founded: 1984

The Finnish Institute at Athens (Greek: Φινλανδικό Iνστιτούτο Aθηνών, Finlandikó Institoúto Athinón, FIA) is a scientific institute of Finland, operating in Athens, Greece. The institute's main objective is to practice and promote research on Greek archaeology, history, language and culture from antiquity until the present day. It is one of the 19 foreign archaeological institutes operating in Greece.

The institute opened in 1984, which makes it the second oldest scientific institute of Finland operating abroad. The current director of the institute is Petra Pakkanen (2021–). The institute's operations are sustained and founded by the Foundation of the Finnish Institute at Athens.

== History ==
=== Founding ===
Nils Oker-Blom, the rector of the University of Helsinki, suggested in 1982, that Finland should open an institute in Athens, similar to the Finnish Institute in Rome which had been operating from Villa Lante since 1954. Behind the initiative was also the honorary consul of Finland in Athens, Konstantinos Lazarakis. The Foundation of the Finnish Institute at Athens was founded in 1983 for the purpose of furthering this initiative and gathering the funding for it; it was added to the Finnish trade register in 1984. Donations were received from a range of supporters: businesses, other foundations, and universities. Initially, some in the field of Classics in Finland were suspicious of the project, due to fears of the new institute depriving Villa Lante of its funding.

The institute began its operations in 1984, with Paavo Castrén as its director. At first the institute was situated in a modest apartment in Makrygianni district that also served as the director's residence. The Finns received significant help in terms of practicalities from the Swedish Institute at Athens. At the time of the Finnish institute's founding, there were archaeological institutes from 12 other countries operating in Athens. The institute received the status of scientific (archaeological) institute on 14 May 1985; its formal opening was organized at the Academy of Athens.

The operations of the institute became more established during the tenure of its second director, Jaakko Frösén. The institute has received national funding from Veikkaus since 1987.

=== New premises ===
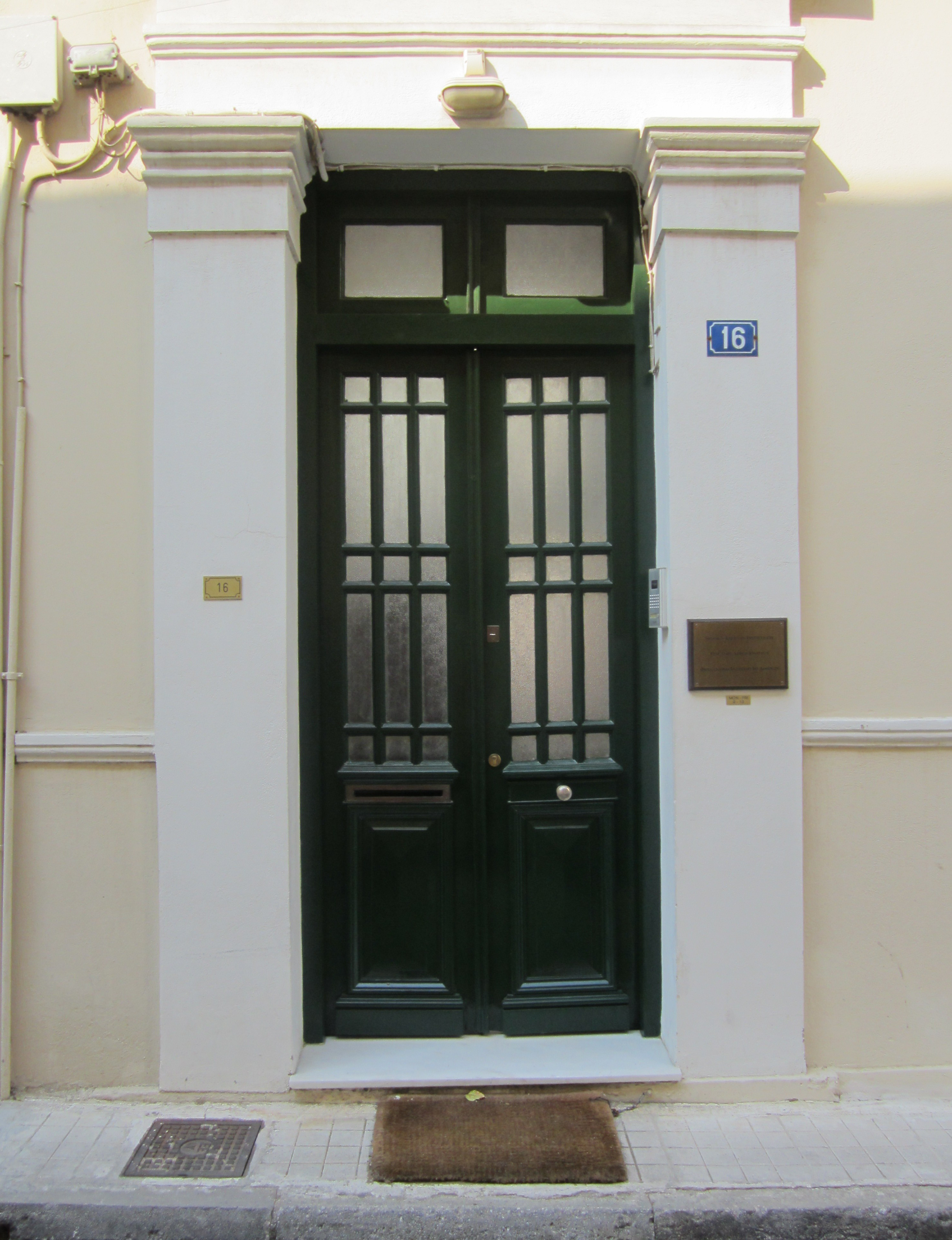
The institute's main door.

Acquiring proper premises for the institute had become relevant by 1987. It was at this stage that a turn-of-the-century townhouse situated in Zítrou 16 was acquired, but it required careful renovation that took several years. In addition, a new apartment for the director was acquired in 1991 from the Karyátidon street nearby.

Housing for the students was first organised at a pension called Penelope, which was rented nearby in collaboration with the Swedish Institute. In 1994 Nikólaos G. Koronaíos donated an entire apartment building to serve as the institute's own guesthouse. This so-called Koroneos-building was opened for use in 1999.

From early on, it was also thought desirable that a joint scientific library would be founded together with other Nordic institutes. This is how the Nordic Library at Athens, located near the institute, was born. It was opened in 1995.

=== Start of scientific activities ===
Before the institute's own fieldwork projects, Finnish researchers acquired fieldwork experience by taking part in Greek and other Nordic institutions' excavations through the Finnish Institute. The institute's own archaeological excavations started in 1999 in Paliámpela near Aréthousa.Subsequent field projects will be outlined below at the section 'Operations'.

=== Directors ===
- Paavo Castrén (1984–1988)
- Jaakko Frösén (1988–1992)
- Henrik Lilius (1992)
- Gunnar af Hällström (1993–1995)
- Kirsti Simonsuuri (1995–1997)
- Olli Salomies (1997–2000)
- Leena Pietilä-Castrén (2000–2004)
- Björn Forsén (2004–2007)
- Martti Leiwo (2008–2013)
- Jari Pakkanen (2013–2017)
- Björn Forsén (2018–2020)
- Petra Pakkanen (2021–)

== Building ==
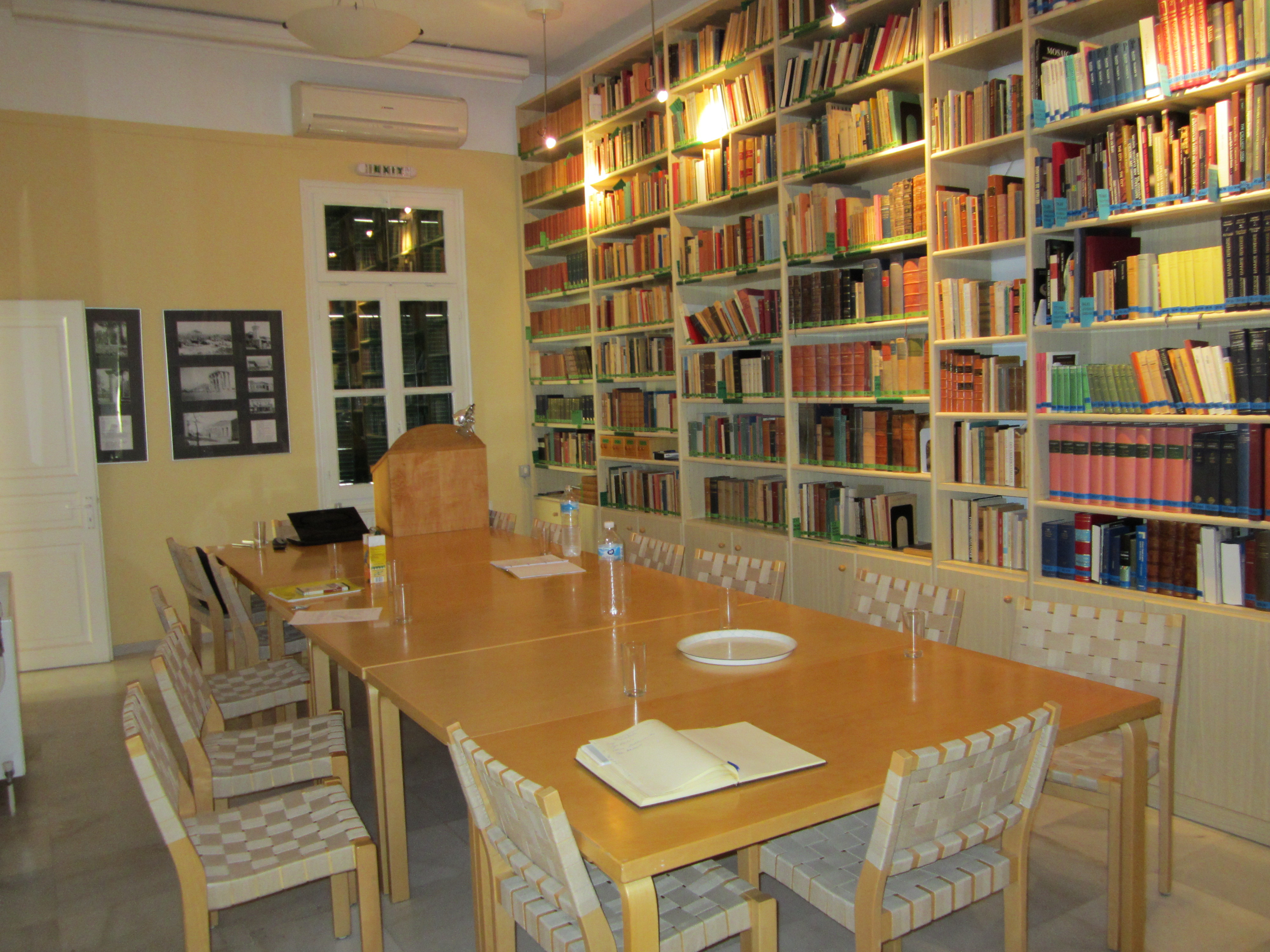
Institute's reference library.

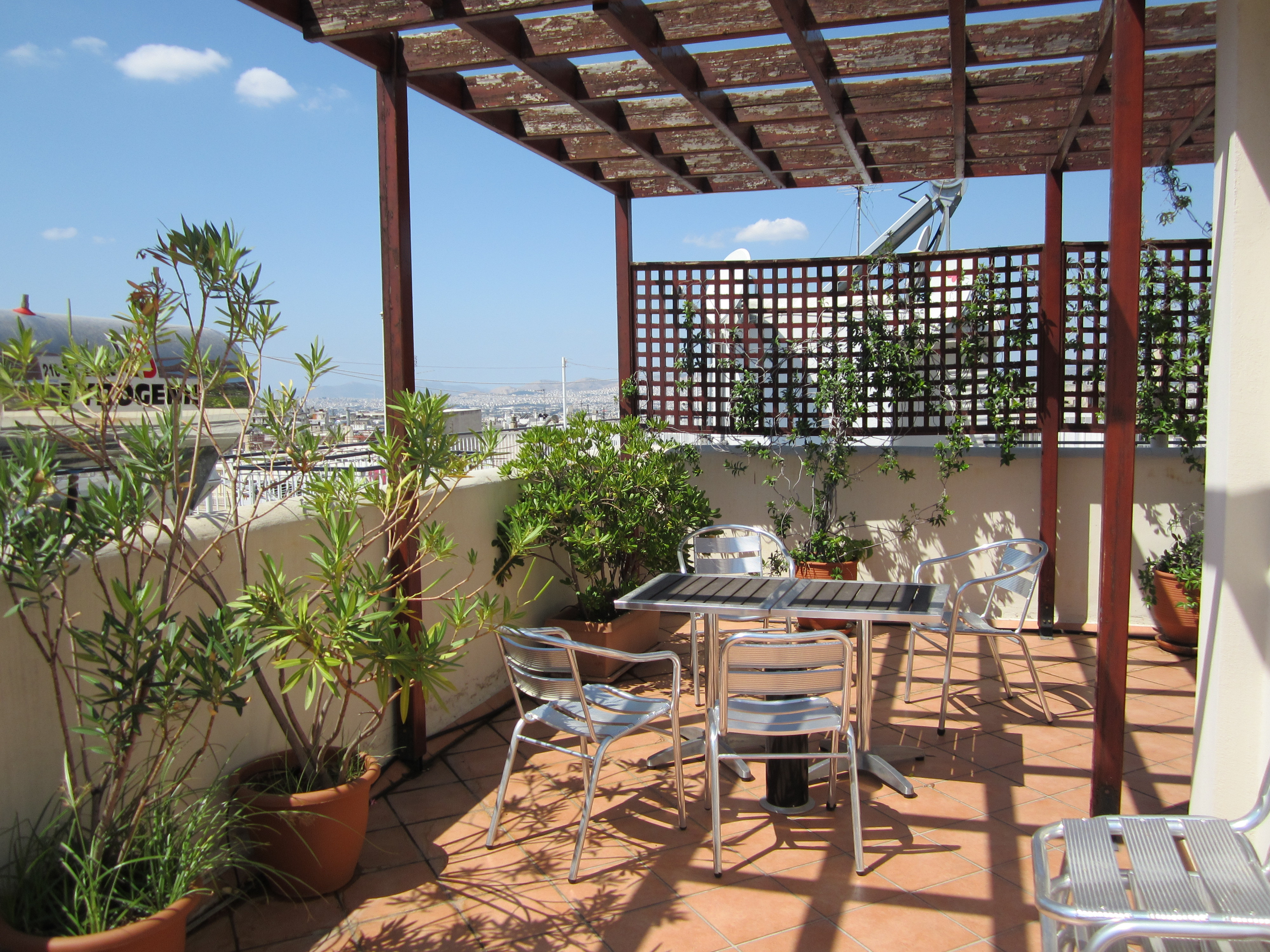
Views from the Koroneos-building.

The Finnish Institute at Athens is situated in a neoclassical building in the centre of Athens, in the Makrygiánni district at Zítrou 16 (37°58′04″N 23°43′37″E), just on the south side of Acropolis and close to the Acropolis Museum. The building includes the institute's staff offices, a lecture hall and a reference library. Near the building is also situated the other Nordic institutes, several other countries' institutes and the Nordic Library. The nearest metro station is Akropoli.

The institute's residence, Koroneos-building (Koronaíos) is situated in the Gkýzin district in Athens on 25 Ioánnou Soútsou (37°59′30″N 23°44′39″E). There are six floors and in a total of 13 furnished apartments for rent. The building is best reached by bus. The nearest metro stations are Ambelokipi and Viktoria.

== Operations ==
The Finnish institute at Athens conducts scientific research through different research and archaeological fieldwork projects. The institute has the status of an archaeological school and therefore the possibility of conducting archaeological excavations in Greece.

In addition to its first fieldwork project at Paliambela, the institute has carried out fieldwork at the temple of Zeus Stratios in Aetolia-Acarnania, in the wally of river Cocytus at Thesprotia, the Sicilian site of Naxos, the ancient port of Kyllene and the area near Asea and Arachamites in the Peloponnese, and the island of Salamis.

In addition to the fieldwork projects, the institute's research has concentrated on topics such as the city of Athens in the Hellenistic and Late Antique periods, Greek epigrams from the Roman period, as well as the connections between modern Greece and Finland and the phenomenon of philhellenism.

The institute has been publishing scholarly publication series Papers and Monographs of the Finnish Institute at Athens since 1994. It also organizes congresses and Greek-themed courses and aims to assist Finnish researchers and students. The institute, the Koroneos-building and the Nordic library together contribute to the residencies of Finnish researchers, students and artists in Greece. The institute also partakes in cultural exchange between Finland and Greece.

=== Research projects and excavations ===
- The Final Pagan Renaissance of Athens, AD 267 – 529
- Hellenistic Athens, 323-30 B.C
- Dionysius the Areopagite in History and Legend
- Mythical Bodies: Greek Myths and European Thought
- Excavations and restoration of early Christian basilica of Paliambela. Near Arethousa in Volvi, Central Macedonia
- Late Classical and Hellenistic Heroa
- Hight reconstruction of the Temple of Zeus at Stratos based on remeasurements. Strátos, Agrínio, Aitolia-Akarnania
- August Myhrberg and North-European Philhellenism: Building the Myth of a Hero
- Verse Inscriptions of Roman Greece (2003–); attached to a project of the Centre of Excellence of the Academy of Finland "Ancient Greek Written Sources" since 2006.
- Interdisciplinary Survey Project in the Kokytos river basin Thesprotia, Epeiros
- Sanctuary and Roman buildings in Agia Paraskevi of Arachamitai. Trípoli, Arkadia
- Kyllene Harbour Project. Andravída-Kyllíni, Elis
- Mapping the town plan and geophysical of The Greek colony of Naxos in Sicily.
- Salamis Urban Landscape Project, Ampelákia (Ambelákia), Salamis, Attica

=== Association of Friends of Finnish Institute at Athens ===
In 1986 association Suomen Ateenan-instituutin ystävät (Association of the friends of Finnish Institute at Athens) was founded. Its purpose was to support institute's operations and cultural exchange between Finland and Greece. Association organizes presentations and trips, gives out scholarships and publishes journal called Helikon.

== Resources ==
- Arjava, Antti: Suomen Ateenan-instituutin vaiheet. In Pietilä-Castrén 2004, p. 9–50.
