= Anıtkabir =

Mausoleum of Turkey's founder, Atatürk, in Ankara

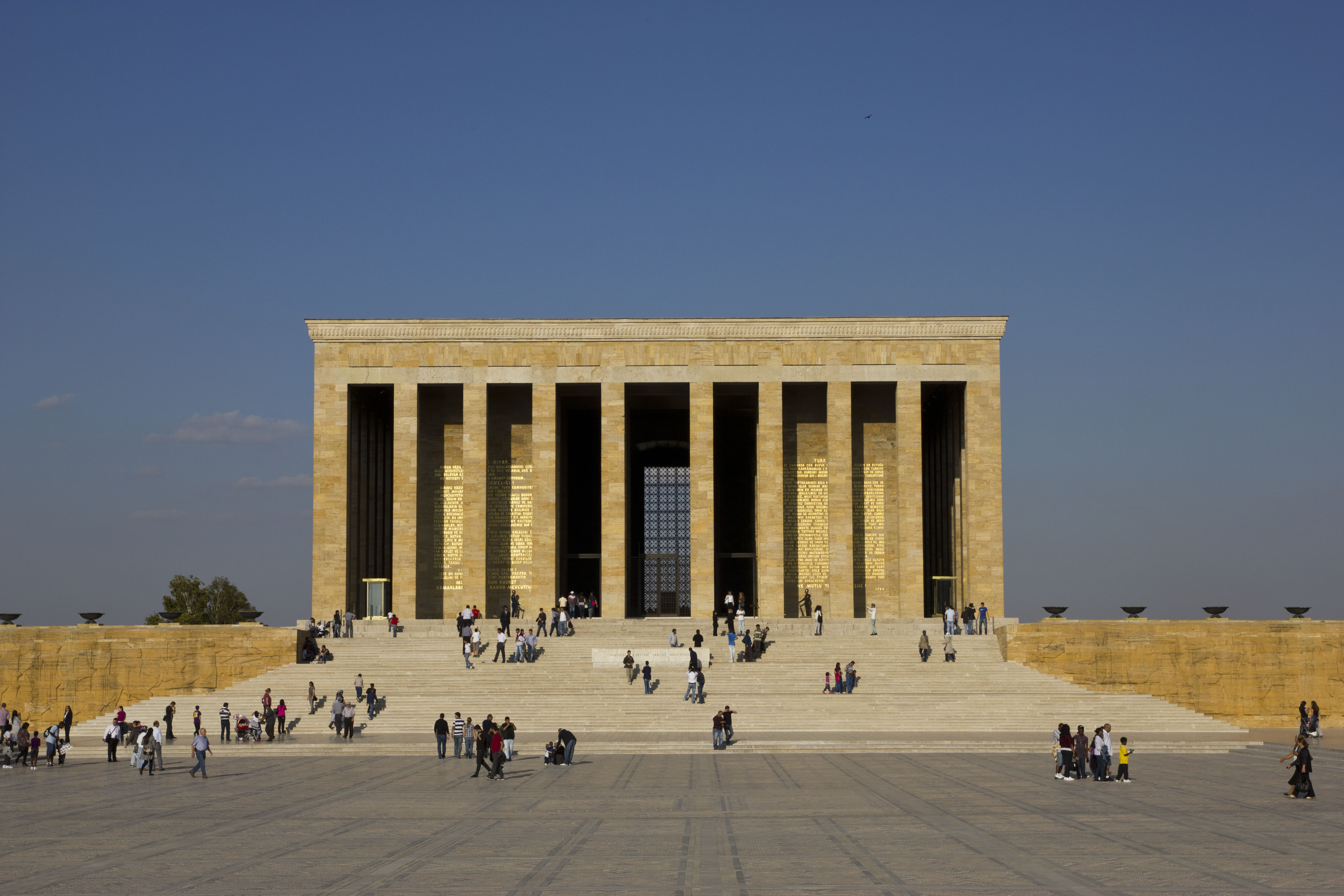
- Interactive map of Anıtkabir
- Location: Çankaya, Ankara, Turkey
- Coordinates: 39°55′32″N 32°50′16″E
- Designer: Emin Onat and Orhan Arda
- Type: Mausoleum
- Material: Concrete, travertine and marble
- Length: 57.35 m (188.2 ft)
- Width: 41.65 m (136.6 ft)
- Height: 27 m (89 ft)
- Beginning date: 9 October 1944
- Completion date: October 1953
- Opening date: 10 November 1953
- Dedicated to: Mustafa Kemal Atatürk

Anıtkabir (Turkish: [aˈnɯtkabiɾ]; lit. 'grave monument') is a complex located in the Çankaya district of Ankara that contains the mausoleum of Mustafa Kemal Atatürk. Designed by Emin Onat and Orhan Arda, construction of Anıtkabir began in 1944 and was completed in 1953. In addition to the mausoleum building and various other structures and monuments, it consists of a wooded area known as the Peace Park.

Following Atatürk's death on 10 November 1938, it was announced that his remains would remain at the Ankara Ethnography Museum until a mausoleum could be constructed in Ankara. A commission was established by the government to determine the location where the mausoleum would be built. In accordance with the report prepared by the commission, the Republican People's Party parliamentary group decided at its meeting on 17 January 1939 that the structure would be built on Rasattepe. Following this decision, expropriation proceedings were initiated for the relevant land, while an international design competition was launched on 1 March 1941 to determine the design of the structure. Following the evaluation of the projects after the competition ended on 2 March 1942, it was decided that the project by Emin Onat and Orhan Arda would be implemented with certain modifications, and construction began with a groundbreaking ceremony held on 9 October 1944. Construction, carried out in four sections, was completed in October 1953, later than originally planned because of various problems and delays; changes were also made to the project while construction was still underway. On 10 November 1953, Atatürk's remains were transferred here in a ceremony. Anıtkabir, which has also contained the tomb of İsmet İnönü since 1973, formerly contained the remains of Cemal Gürsel, who was buried there in 1966, and eleven people who were buried there between 1960 and 1963; their remains were removed from Anıtkabir in 1988.

In the Şeref Holü (Hall of Honour), the main section of the mausoleum building, Atatürk's symbolic sarcophagus is located, while Atatürk's remains are buried in the burial chamber on the lower level of the building. The complex is entered from the beginning of the alley known as the Lion Road, which leads to the ceremonial plaza. The mausoleum is located on one side of this area, which is surrounded by colonnades, while the exit from the complex is located on the opposite side of the plaza along the axis of the Lion Road. The complex contains ten towers, two groups of statues, and the Atatürk and War of Independence Museum, with the towers located at the four corners of the Lion Road, at the exit of the ceremonial plaza, and at the corners of the plaza. All of these structures, collectively known as the Monument Block, are surrounded by a wooded area called the Peace Park. The structures in the complex are reinforced concrete, and different types of marble and travertine are used on their surfaces and floors. Decorations created using relief, mosaic, fresco, and carving techniques are found in various parts of the complex. The structure, which is Neoclassical in the style of the Second National Architectural Movement, bears traces of the Hittite, Ancient Greek, Seljuk, and Ottoman cultures that ruled over the territory of present-day Turkey throughout history.

Responsibility for all services and activities at Anıtkabir belongs to the Turkish General Staff, and activities held here are regulated by law. During national holidays in Turkey and on 10 November, the anniversary of Atatürk's death, official commemorative ceremonies are held at Anıtkabir by the government. In addition, ceremonies are organized by persons included in the state protocol and representatives of other natural and legal persons. Anıtkabir is also a place visited from time to time by foreign government officials during official visits to Turkey, where official ceremonies are held.

== History ==
=== Background and determination of the location of the mausoleum ===
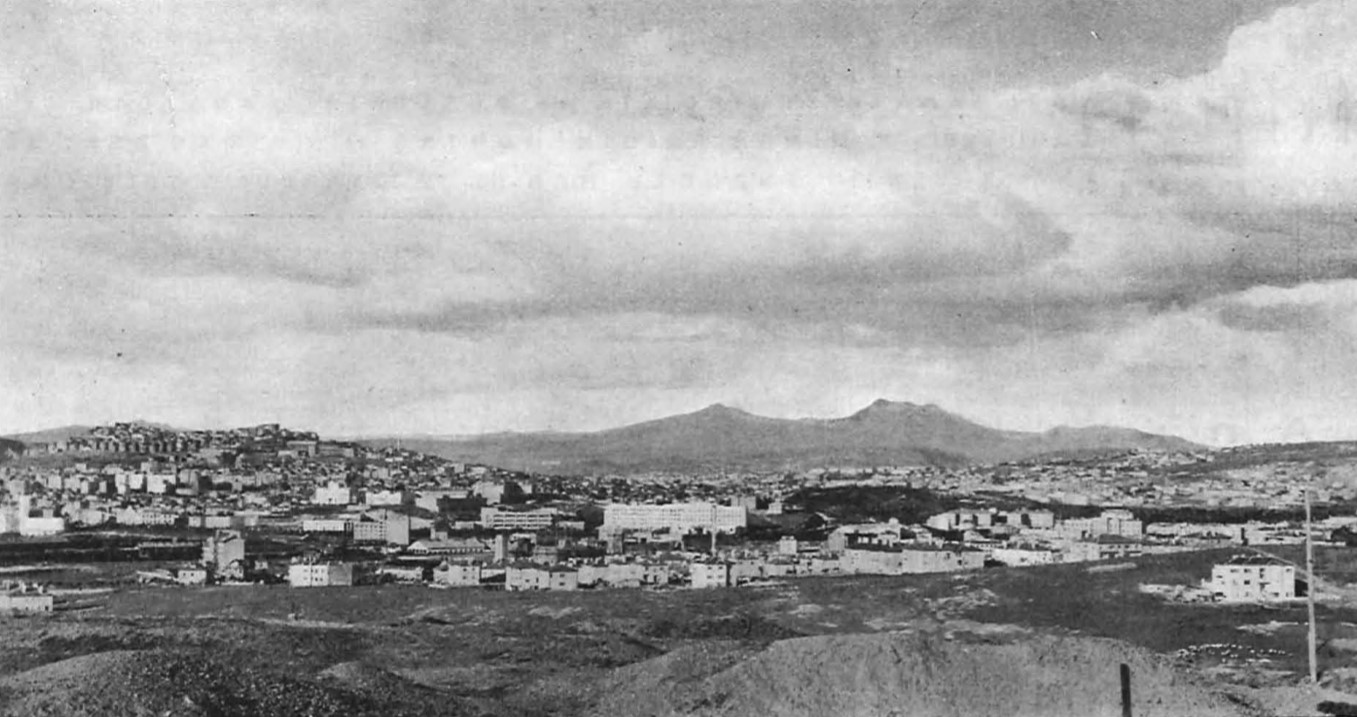
View of Ankara from Rasattepe before the construction of Anıtkabir

Following Mustafa Kemal Atatürk's death at Dolmabahçe Palace in Istanbul on 10 November 1938, various discussions concerning his burial place began in the press. In a government statement dated 13 November, it was announced that it had been decided that Atatürk's remains would remain at the Ankara Ethnography Museum until a mausoleum was built for him. The funeral was transported to Ankara on 19 November and placed in the museum during a ceremony held on 21 November.

The commission established to determine the location of the mausoleum prepared a report after obtaining the opinions of a delegation of foreign architects. On 24 December, the Council of Ministers decided to refer the report to the Republican People's Party Parliamentary Group for examination. At the parliamentary group meeting on 3 January 1939, a 15-member CHP Anıtkabir Party Group Commission was established to examine the report. After conducting investigations at various locations, the commission decided at its meeting on 17 January that the mausoleum should be built at Rasattepe. Initially, since part of the land on which the mausoleum was to be built was privately owned, expropriation proceedings began in June 1939.

=== Design phase ===
The commission, composed of members of the Republican People's Party and responsible for expropriating the land on which Anıtkabir would be built, decided on 6 October 1939 to organize an international design competition to determine the design of Anıtkabir. In a communiqué dated 18 February 1941, the commission announced that a design competition would be held, with a deadline of 31 October 1941. The competition began on 1 March 1941 after its specifications were revised because of changes to its provisions. According to the specifications, a jury consisting of at least three people would recommend three projects to the government for first place, and the government would select one of them. Because the members of the competition jury could not be determined by the planned closing date of October 1941, the competition period was extended on 25 October until 2 March 1942. During the competition, Ivar Tengbom, Károly Weichinger, and Paul Bonatz were appointed as jury members; following the end of the competition, Arif Hikmet Holtay, Muammer Çavuşoğlu, and Muhlis Sertel were also appointed.

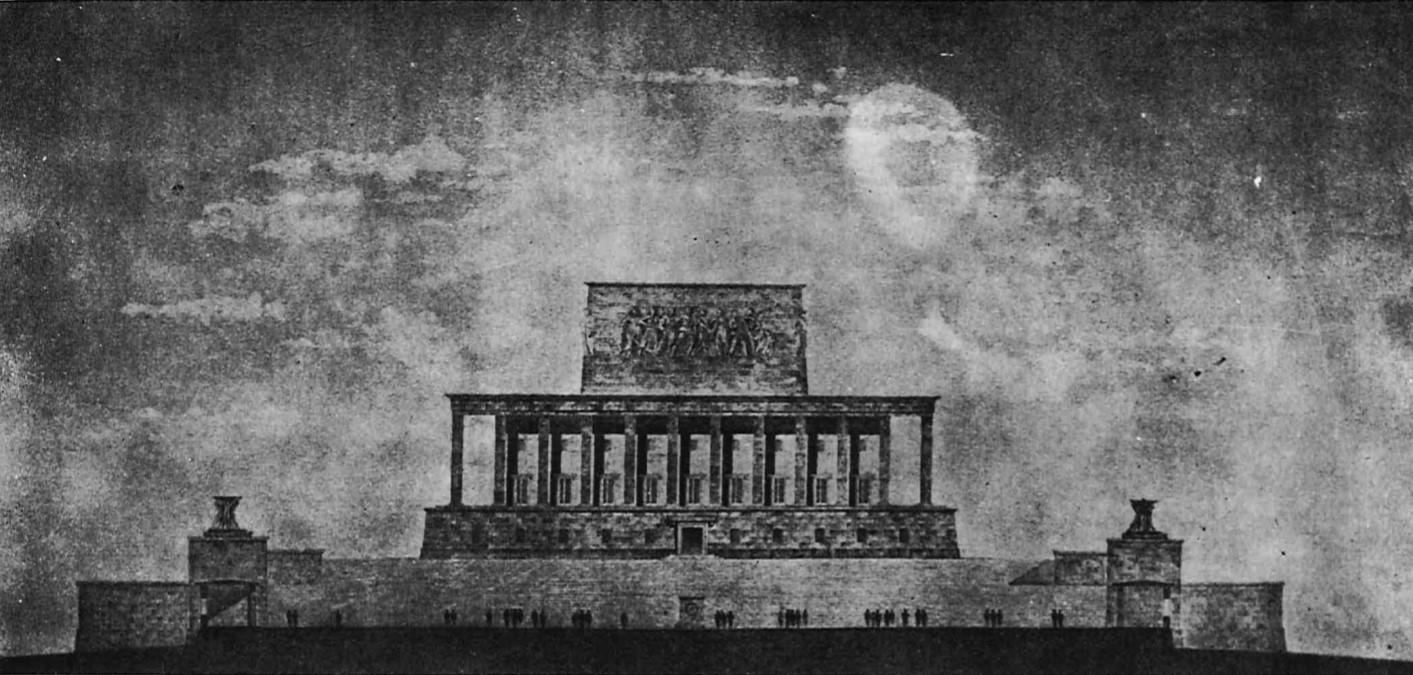
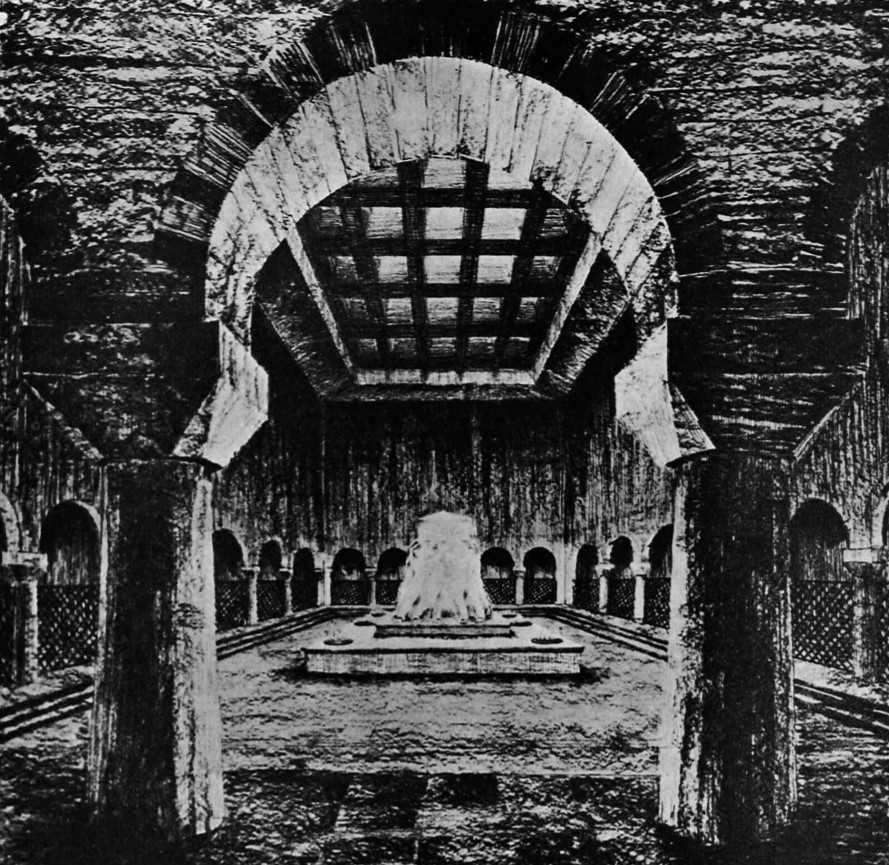
The initial version of the mausoleum section of the Anıtkabir project selected as a result of the competition (above), and the Hall of Honour in the initial version of the project

A total of 49 projects were submitted to the competition: 25 from Turkey, 11 from Germany, 9 from Italy, and one each from Austria, Czechoslovakia, France, and Switzerland. After projects disqualified for various reasons were eliminated, 47 projects were submitted to the jury for evaluation on 11 March 1942. The jury completed its work on 21 March and submitted its evaluation report to the Prime Ministry. The report recommended to the government the projects by Johannes Krüger, Arnaldo Foschini, and Emin Onat and Orhan Arda. It stated that none of the three projects was suitable for direct implementation and that they needed to be reconsidered and modified. The report also recommended honorable mentions for projects by Hamit Kemali Söylemezoğlu, Kemal Ahmet Arû and Recai Akçay, Mehmet Ali Handan and Feridun Akozan, Giovanni Muzio, Roland Rohn, and Giuseppe Vaccaro and Gino Franzi. A summary of the report was made public by the Prime Ministry in a communiqué on 23 March.

At a Council of Ministers meeting chaired by President İsmet İnönü on 7 May, the project by Onat and Arda was selected as the winner of the competition. The other two projects recommended by the competition jury were awarded second place, while five projects received honorable mentions. Initially, the government decided not to implement any of the projects, including the one it had selected as the winner, but changed this decision with a communiqué published on 9 June, announcing that the Onat and Arda project would be implemented after certain modifications. These modifications were to be made by a committee that would also include the project's designers. On 5 April 1943, the Prime Ministry instructed Onat and Arda to prepare a new project within six months in accordance with the jury's criticisms. The Prime Ministry Anıtkabir Commission, to which the architects submitted their second project, decided on 18 November 1943 that the project would be implemented after the architects made the modifications they deemed appropriate. Responsibility for carrying out the construction was assigned to the Ministry of Public Works on 20 November. The third project, incorporating the changes made by Onat and Arda following this decision, entered the implementation stage with the contract signed between the architects and the Ministry on 4 July 1944.

=== Construction phase ===
==== First and second sections ====
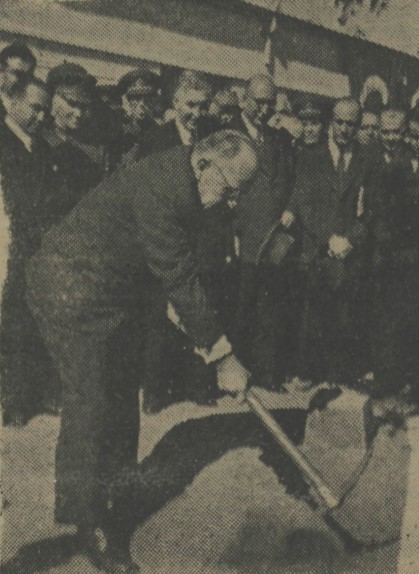
Prime Minister Şükrü Saracoğlu striking the first blow at the groundbreaking ceremony (9 October 1944)

Before the construction of Anıtkabir, Rasattepe was a barren area without trees. In August 1944, before the foundation was laid, water infrastructure work costing 80,000 lira was carried out to facilitate the afforestation of the area. Landscape planning for Anıtkabir and its surroundings began in 1946 under the leadership of Sadri Aran. As part of the landscaping and afforestation carried out according to Aran's plan, afforestation, soil grading, and sapling planting were undertaken, and afforestation and landscaping activities continued regularly even after the opening in 1953.

The tender for the first section of construction, which included soil grading on the construction site and the construction of the retaining walls of the alley, was held by the Ministry of Public Works on 4 September 1944 and won by Nurhayr Company, owned by Hayri Kayadelen. The groundbreaking ceremony for Anıtkabir, held on 9 October 1944, was attended by the prime minister, ministers, and civilian and military bureaucrats. On 12 October, the government prepared a bill requesting authorization to allocate funds for the construction of Anıtkabir. According to the bill submitted to parliament by the Prime Ministry on 1 November, the Ministry of Public Works was authorized to enter into temporary commitments of up to 10,000,000 lira for the period 1945–1949, provided that they did not exceed 2,500,000 lira in any one year. The bill was discussed and approved by the Parliamentary Budget Commission on 18 November, approved by the General Assembly on 22 November, and entered into force after being published in the T.C. Resmî Gazete on 4 December 1944.

Model of Anıtkabir dated 1944. It also includes the section planned to be located above the mausoleum but removed following changes made for cost-saving purposes.

While the Building and Construction Works Directorate of the Ministry of Public Works was responsible for the construction supervision and engineering services, it was decided that Orhan Arda would take up his post at the end of May 1945 to supervise construction and remain continuously on site. Ekrem Demirtaş was appointed head of construction supervision, but after Demirtaş left his post on 29 December 1945, he was replaced by Sabiha Gürayman. The first section of construction was completed at the end of 1945. During excavations conducted by the Turkish Historical Society at Rasattepe, a tumulus site, in July 1945, several archaeological finds dating from the Phrygian period were discovered.

A contract was signed on 20 September 1945 between the Ministry and Rar Türk, the company that won the tender held on 18 August 1945 for the second section of construction, which covered the construction of the mausoleum building and the buildings surrounding the ceremonial plaza. The start of the second section was delayed because of the preparation of the soil survey, changes to the foundation system, and the preparation and payment of reinforced concrete and structural calculations; foundation construction began during the 1947 construction season. The stone and marble to be used in the construction of Anıtkabir were brought from various parts of the country. Because the country lacked a sufficient stone industry for the construction, quarries were sought throughout the country, and in addition to opening the identified quarries, various efforts were undertaken to extract the stone.

In accordance with a decision of the Ministry of Public Works dated 18 December, the Building Works Directorate opened a tender on 23 January 1945 for a survey of the land on which Anıtkabir would be built from the perspectives of earthquakes and soil mechanics. Hamdi Peynircioğlu won the tender. Following the commencement of the work the next day, the resulting report was submitted on 20 May 1945, while an analytical report on the chemical properties of the soil and groundwater was submitted on 1 December 1945. Based on the report's recommendation that the foundation system needed to be changed, the Ministry of Public Works requested that such a modification be made to the building's foundation. The changes sought in the project following the report led to a legal dispute between Onat and Arda and the Ministry. Following the decision to change the foundation, the architects prepared a new project accordingly. After this change, construction was halted until May 1948 because Rar Türk demanded a price difference, claiming that it had suffered losses by purchasing more materials than necessary, followed by bureaucratic problems.

Following the 14 May 1950 elections, the Democrat Party government that came to power established a commission with the aim of both completing construction more quickly through certain changes and achieving certain savings. In this context, the commission's report containing the proposed changes to the project was approved at a Council of Ministers meeting on 29 November 1950.

==== Third and fourth sections ====
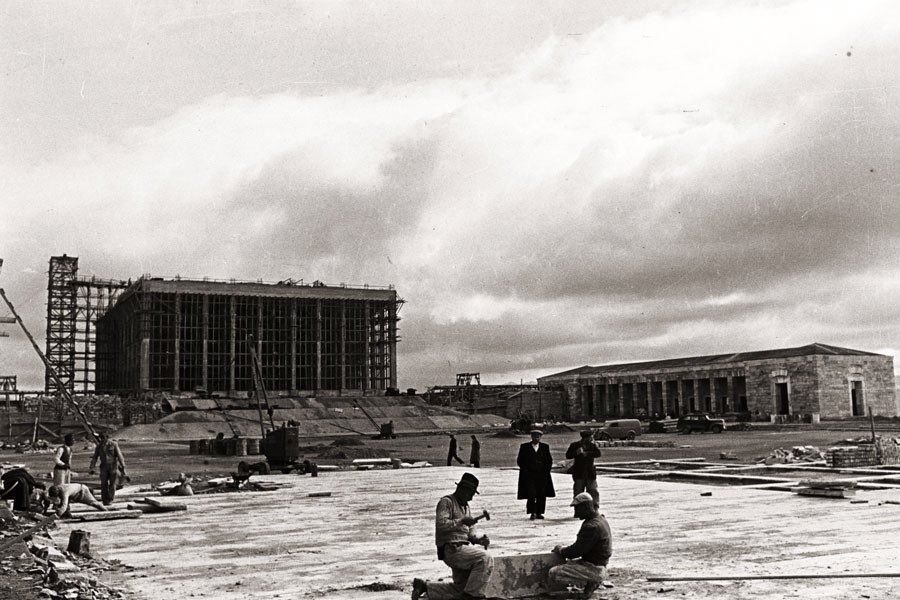
View of the construction of Anıtkabir (1951)

While construction of the second section was continuing, Amaç Ticaret won the tender for the third section of construction, which concluded on 11 September 1950. This section included paving the roads leading to Anıtkabir, the Lion Road, and the ceremonial area; paving the upper floor of the mausoleum building; constructing the steps; installing the sarcophagus stone; and carrying out utility works. Muzaffer Budak's company won the tender for the fourth and final section of construction, held on 6 June 1951. This section consisted of flooring the Hall of Honour, the lower surfaces of the vaults, stone profiles around the Hall of Honour, eaves decorations, and marble work. The materials used in these sections were obtained from Kayseri, Hasandere, Hatay, Afyonkarahisar, Çanakkale, Adana, Haymana, Polatlı, and the Gavur Mountains.

A commission established to determine the reliefs, sculptures, inscriptions, and objects to be displayed in the museum decided at its meeting on 31 August 1951 that the contents should be selected with consideration given to Atatürk's life and activities during the War of Independence and the Atatürk's Reforms. Two separate subcommissions were established to determine the inscriptions, sculptures, and reliefs. At its meeting on 1 September 1951, the commission determined the characteristics that the towers, inscriptions, sculptures, and reliefs at Anıtkabir should have. The report prepared by the subcommission responsible for determining the texts of the inscriptions at its meeting on 7 January 1952 stated that it had been decided that the texts throughout the complex should contain only Atatürk's words.

The competition for the 19 sculptures and reliefs whose subjects had already been determined, and which was open exclusively to Turkish artists, ended on 19 January 1952. According to the results announced on 26 January 1952, the groups of male and female statues at the entrance and the lion statues along the alley were assigned to Hüseyin Anka Özkan; the relief depicting the Battle of Sakarya on the right side of the stairs leading to the mausoleum was assigned to İlhan Koman; the relief depicting the Battle of the Field of the Commander-in-Chief on the left side and the reliefs in the Independence, Mehmetçik, and Freedom towers were assigned to Zühtü Müridoğlu; the relief beneath the speaker's podium and flagpole was assigned to Kenan Yontunç; and the reliefs in the Revolution, Peace, Defence of Rights, and National Pact towers were assigned to Nusret Suman. Since no work was deemed worthy of first prize for the relief in the 23 April Tower, the work that came second, by Hakkı Atamulu, was implemented. As no work was found that "successfully represented the subject" for the Republic and Victory towers, it was decided not to install reliefs on these towers. The production of the reliefs planned for the side walls of the Hall of Honour containing the sarcophagus was also cancelled at the meeting of 1 September 1951 because no work was found that successfully represented the subject. An international tender for the execution of the sculptures and reliefs was held on 26 August 1952 and won by MARMI, based in Italy, while Nusret Suman, who was to execute several of the reliefs, became a subcontractor of the company. The international tender for the inscriptions throughout the complex, held on 17 July 1953, was won by Emin Barın.

The project architects commissioned Nezih Eldem to determine the mosaic motifs to be used at Anıtkabir. Eldem designed all of the mosaic decorations at Anıtkabir except for those in the central section of the Hall of Honour. For the mosaic motifs on the ceiling of the Hall of Honour, a composition was created by combining eleven motifs taken from 15th- and 16th-century Turkish carpet and rug designs in the Museum of Turkish and Islamic Arts. Because mosaic decoration could not be produced in Turkey at the time, the mosaics were manufactured in Italy and sent piece by piece to Ankara; their installation began on 22 July 1952 and continued until 10 November 1953. Tarık Levendoğlu won the tender held on 27 March 1953 for the fresco-style decorations on the columns surrounding the mausoleum, the colonnades in front of the auxiliary buildings, and the ceilings of the towers. According to the contract signed on 11 April 1953, the fresco motifs were to be provided by the administration. The fresco work began on 30 April 1953 and was completed on 10 November 1953. On 11 September 1954, a tender was initiated for the dry-fresco work and iron staircases in the mausoleum building.

It was announced that construction of Anıtkabir had been completed on 26 October 1953. At the end of construction, the total cost of the project was approximately 20 million lira, leaving a saving of approximately 4 million lira from the 24 million lira budget allocated to the project. On the morning of 10 November 1953, the coffin containing Atatürk's remains was taken from the Ethnography Museum and brought to Anıtkabir in a ceremony, where the remains were buried in the burial chamber of the mausoleum building. Upon completion of construction, Anıtkabir covered a total area of 670,000 square metres; following expropriations carried out in 1964 and 1982, the area occupied by Anıtkabir reached its present boundaries.

=== Later modifications ===
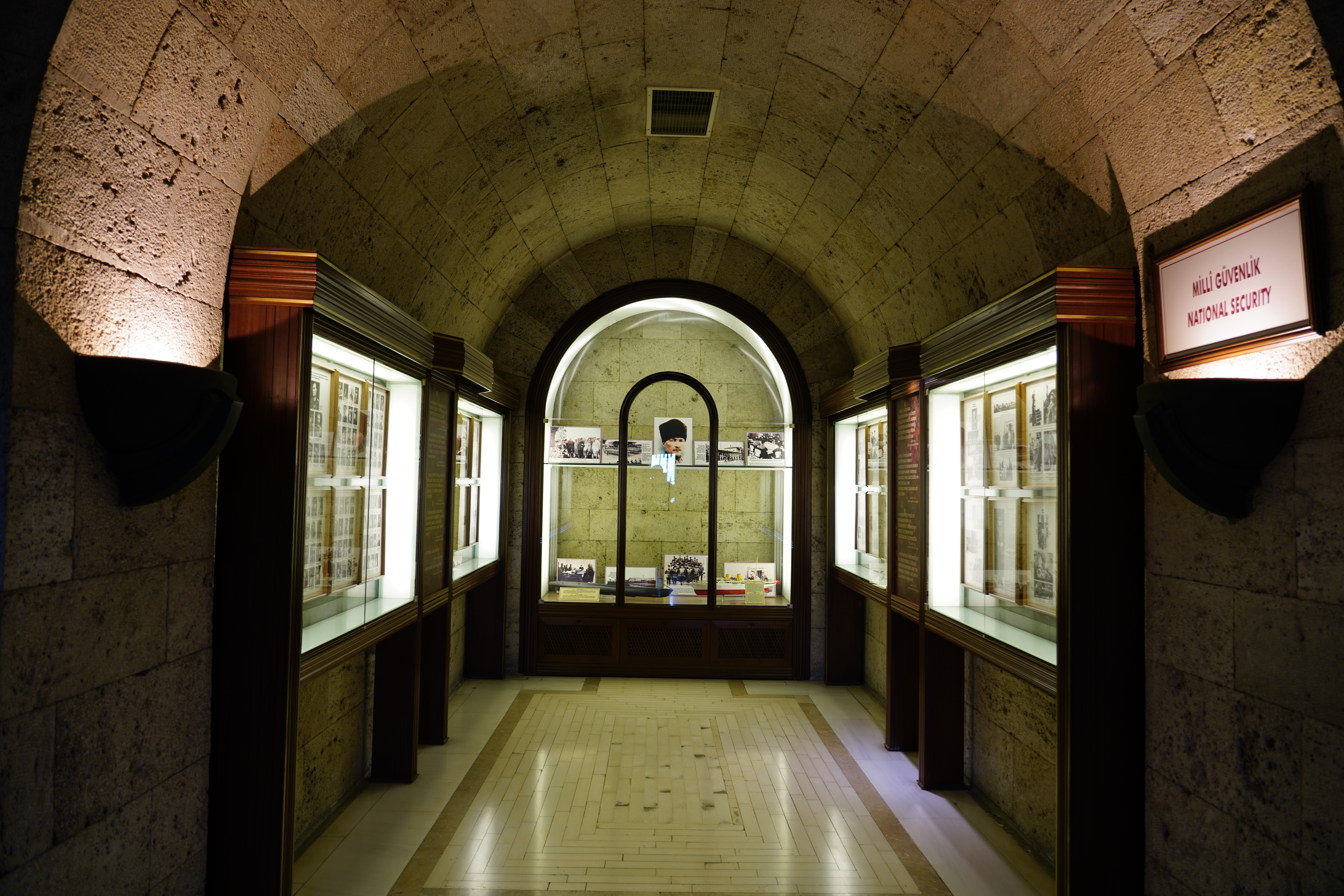
View from the Atatürk and War of Independence Museum following renovation work completed on 26 August 2002

Following a communiqué issued by the National Unity Committee on 3 June 1960, five "Martyrs of Freedom" who had died during "demonstrations they carried out for the sake of freedom" between 28 April and 27 May 1960 were buried at Anıtkabir on 10 June 1960. Six people who died on the government side during clashes that occurred during the military intervention of 20 May 1963 were buried here in May 1963 in accordance with a decision taken at the 23 May 1963 meeting of the National Security Council. The remains of the fourth President, Cemal Gürsel, who died on 14 September 1966, were buried in Anıtkabir's Martyrs of Freedom section on 18 September 1966, in accordance with a decision taken at the Council of Ministers meeting on 15 September 1966. The remains of İsmet İnönü, who died on 25 December 1973, were also buried on the grounds of Anıtkabir in a state ceremony held on 28 December 1973.

Following the 12 September coup, a law enacted by the National Security Council on 10 November 1981 established that only Atatürk's and İnönü's graves would remain at Anıtkabir. Although the transfer of İnönü's remains to the State Cemetery had been planned when the law was being drafted, after the İnönü family was consulted and expressed its preference for the remains to remain at Anıtkabir, the law was enacted accordingly. The graves of the eleven people buried at Anıtkabir after 27 May 1960 and 21 May 1963 were opened on 24 August 1988 and their remains were transferred to Cebeci Military Cemetery; Gürsel's grave was opened on 27 August 1988 and his remains were buried at the State Cemetery on 30 August 1988.

In 1977, glass was installed in the windows of the Hall of Honour. In 1981, the centenary of Atatürk's birth, soil brought from all 67 provinces of Turkey, as well as from Cyprus, was placed in brass vases and arranged around Atatürk's remains. As the number of provinces increased, the number of vases containing soil also increased, eventually reaching 83 together with soil brought from Azerbaijan. That same year, the text of Atatürk's final message to the Turkish army, dated 29 October 1938, was added to the wall to the right of the door inside the Hall of Honour, while the text of İnönü's condolence message to the Turkish nation following Atatürk's death, dated 21 November 1938, was added to the wall on the left.

Following evaluations begun in 2000, an area beneath the mausoleum section was converted into a museum and opened on 26 August 2002 under the name Atatürk and War of Independence Museum.

== Architectural style ==
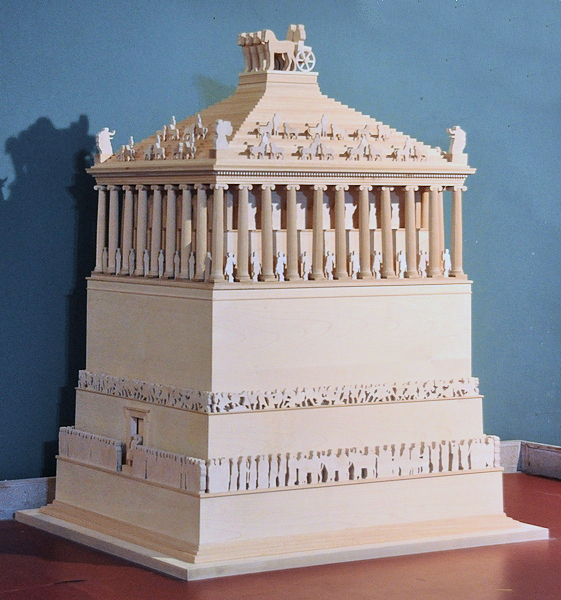
Model of the Mausoleum at Halicarnassus displayed at the Museum of Underwater Archaeology

The overall architecture of Anıtkabir bears the characteristics of the Second National Architectural Movement, which was prominent between 1940 and 1950. Islamic and Ottoman architecture were deliberately not used in the architecture of the complex. Referring to the ancient roots of Anatolia, the architects took the Mausoleum at Halicarnassus as a model in their project. The composition of both structures basically consists of columns surrounding the exterior of a main mass in the form of a rectangular prism. Doğan Kuban, who stated that this classical style was repeated at Anıtkabir, explained that "the Mausoleum at Halicarnassus was taken as a model because of the desire to claim Anatolia." American architectural historian Christopher Wilson writes that, following the removal of the roof of the mausoleum from the project, the building became "a simple and abstract, columned main building resembling a Hellenic temple atop an acropolis." The lion statues along the Lion Road are symbols used by the Hittites, who ruled in Anatolia.

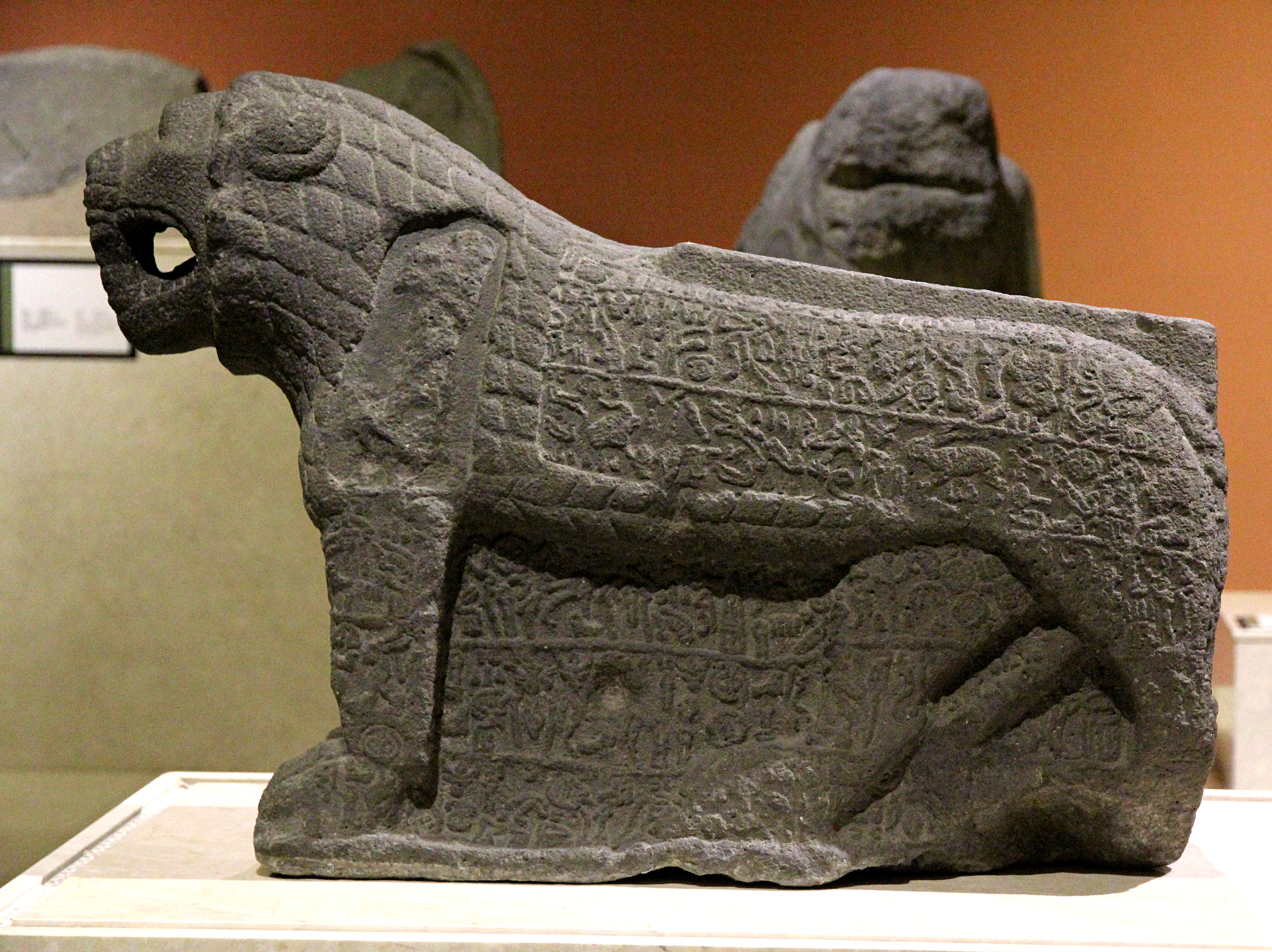
The Maraş lion, a lion statue dating from the Hittite period

The replacement of the column-and-beam floor system in the building's interior architecture with a system of arches, domes (later removed through subsequent modifications), and vaults introduced elements derived from Ottoman architecture into the interior design. In addition, the colorful stone decorations featuring carpet motifs on the floors of the colonnades, ceremonial plaza, and Hall of Honour, as well as on the ceilings of the buildings, bear the characteristics of decorations found in Seljuk and Ottoman architecture. Atatürk's octagonal-plan burial chamber follows the tradition of türbe architecture from the Seljuk and Ottoman periods. Onat expressed the complex use of these different architectural styles at Anıtkabir in the following words:

Although the Ottoman era was an era full of honors, it must be admitted that it consisted of a closed world dominated by the scholastic spirit. In reality, our history was not merely a civilization turned inward, what Ziya Gökalp once called the "era of the ummah." Like many of the peoples of the Mediterranean, our history goes back thousands of years. It begins with the Sumerians and the Hittites and becomes intertwined with the lives of many peoples, from Central Asia to the interior of Europe. It constituted one of the greatest roots of the classical tradition of Mediterranean civilization. While instilling in us a taste for this rich and fertile history, Atatürk broadened our horizons. He made one of the greatest advances to free us from the Middle Ages. He showed us that our true past lay not in the Middle Ages, but in the common sources of the world's classics ... It was for this reason that we wanted the monument we intended to establish for the Great Leader, representing the revolution through which the Turkish nation awakened from scholasticism and freed itself from the Middle Ages, to express the new spirit he brought ... That is why we wanted to establish the Monument-Tomb of the Ata who made our greatest advances toward Westernization in a classical spirit, entirely distinct from the spirit of a sultan's or saint's tomb, and based on the rational lines of a seven-thousand-year-old civilization.

Şevki Vanlı, who described Anıtkabir as "the structure in Turkey with the greatest Nazi influence", stated that the building had a totalitarian identity and characterized it as "of Roman origin, with a Nazi interpretation." Doğan Kuban likewise stated that, as a result of changes made to the project in 1950, the building was transformed into "a Hitler-style building." Wilson, meanwhile, notes that the sculptures and reliefs at Anıtkabir resemble socialist realism.

== Location and site plan ==
Site plan of Anıtkabir: 1. Independence Tower, 2. Freedom Tower, 3. Female Statue Group, 4. Male Statue Group, 5. Lion Road, 6. Lion statues, 7. Mehmetçik Tower, 8. Defence of Rights Tower, 9. Victory Tower, 10. Peace Tower, 11. 23 April Tower, 12. Flagpole, 13. National Pact Tower, 14. First section of the museum, 15. Revolution Tower, 16. Republic Tower, 17. Battle of Sakarya reliefs, 18. Battle of the Field of the Commander-in-Chief reliefs, 19. Podium, 20. Hall of Honour, 21. Sarcophagus, 22. Atatürk's tomb beneath the sarcophagus, 23. Atatürk Special Library and art gallery, 24. Ceremonial area, 25. İnönü's sarcophagus, 26. Anıtkabir Command, 27. Anıtkabir Museum Directorate, 28. Lounge, 29. Restrooms

Anıtkabir is located on a hill 906 m above sea level, formerly known as Rasattepe and today called Anıttepe. Administratively, it is located at 31 Akdeniz Caddesi in the Mebusevleri neighborhood of Ankara's Çankaya district.

Anıtkabir is divided into two main sections: the Monument Block, consisting of the Lion Road, ceremonial area, and mausoleum building, and the Peace Park, consisting of various plants. Of its total area of 750,000 m^{2}, 120,000 m^{2} is occupied by the Monument Block and 630,000 m^{2} by the Peace Park. Beyond the entrance accessed by the stairs in the direction of Anadolu Square, there is an alley known as the Lion Road, which extends northwest–southeast toward the ceremonial area. At the beginning of the Lion Road are the rectangular Freedom and Independence towers, with male and female statue groups respectively positioned in front of them. The Lion Road is lined with roses and junipers on both sides and has twelve lion statues on each side. At the end of the road, which provides access to the rectangular ceremonial area via three steps, the Mehmetçik and Defence of Rights towers are located on the right and left sides, respectively.

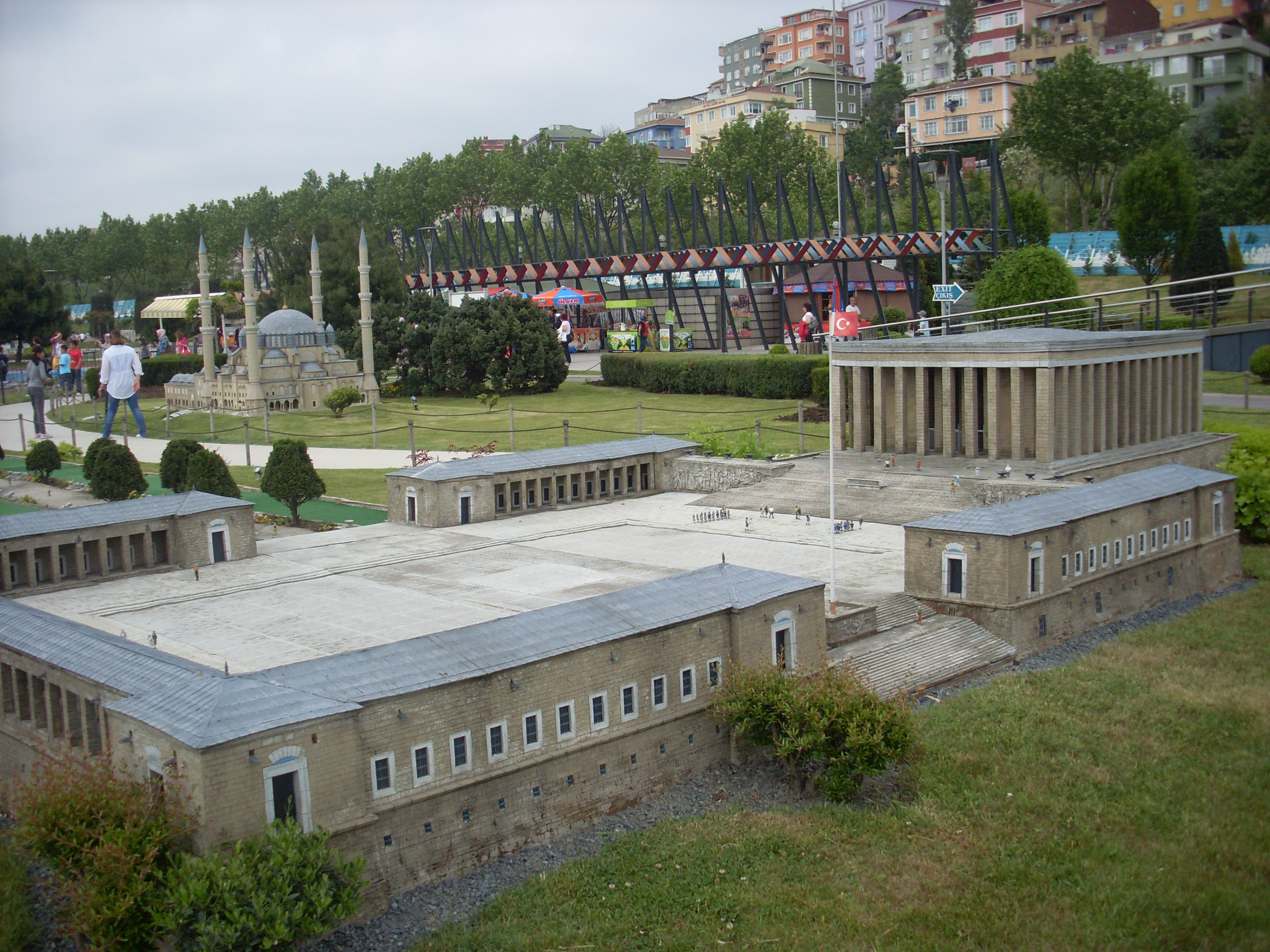
Model of Anıtkabir at Miniatürk

Rectangular-plan towers are located at each corner of the ceremonial area, which is surrounded by colonnades on three sides. Directly opposite the entrance to the ceremonial area along the axis of the Lion Road is the exit from Anıtkabir. A flagpole flying the flag of Turkey stands in the middle of the stairs at the exit, while the 23 April and National Pact towers are located on either side of the exit. The Victory, Peace, Revolution, and Republic towers at the corners of the ceremonial area bring the total number of towers to ten. The colonnades surrounding the area house the Anıtkabir Command, an art gallery and library, the museum, and the museum directorate. In the middle of the staircase leading from the ceremonial area to the mausoleum, which is surrounded by colonnades, is a speaker's podium, with a relief on each of the walls on either side. The Hall of Honour contains Atatürk's symbolic sarcophagus, while the burial chamber containing Atatürk's remains is located beneath this section. Directly opposite the mausoleum, in the center of the section containing the colonnades surrounding the ceremonial area, is İnönü's sarcophagus.

== Sections ==
=== Mausoleum ===
==== Exterior architecture ====
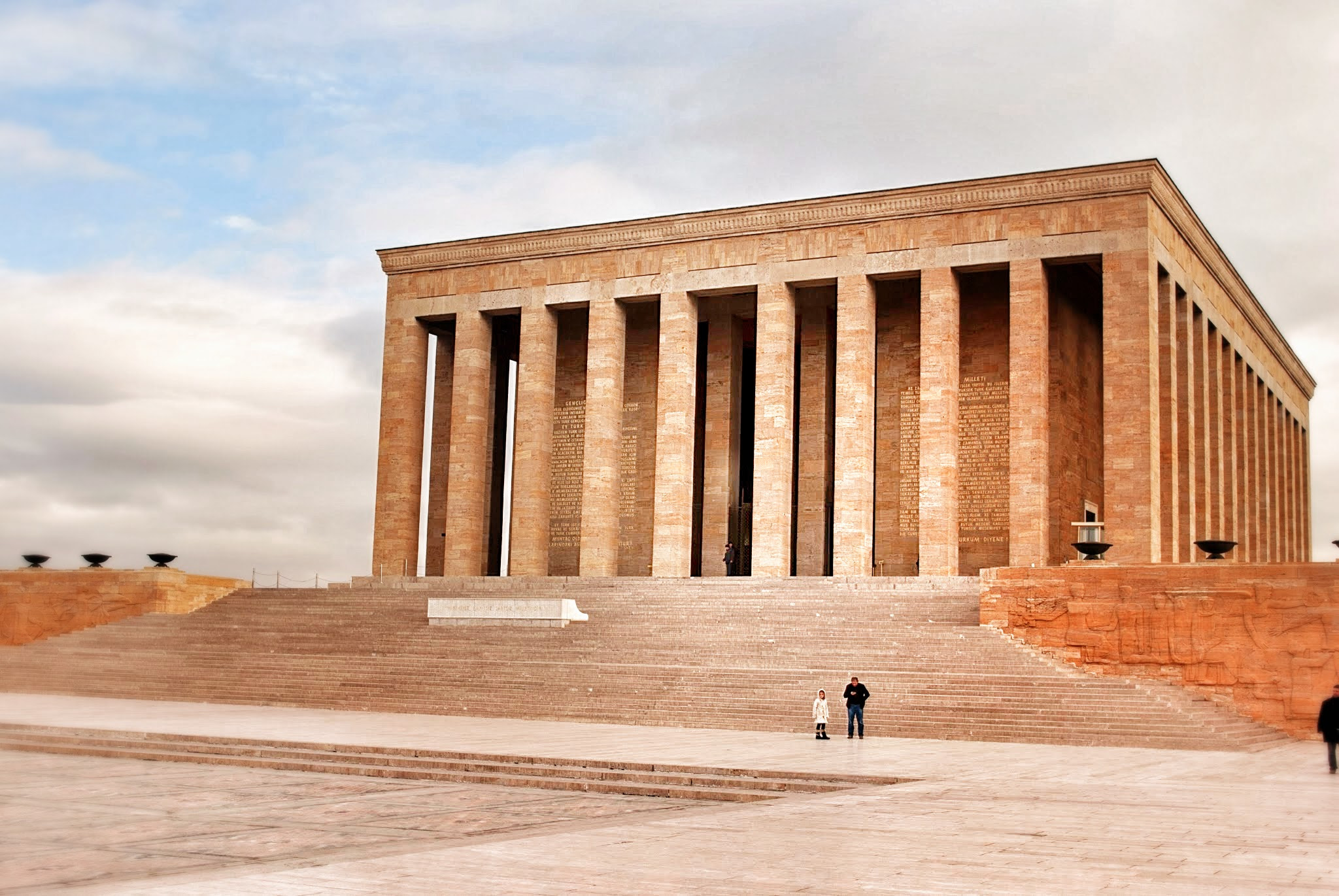
The mausoleum section of Anıtkabir

The mausoleum building has a rectangular plan measuring 72 × 52 m at ground level and is 17 m high. It is a reinforced concrete structure built on a symmetrical and regular foundation, with a height of 22.8 m from the foundation upwards. The 18 m-wide Hall of Honor contains 27 beams extending along the east–west axis, each 1,000 mm deep and 500 mm wide. The beams are supported by pairs of columns spaced 5.5 m apart. The building is surrounded by a colonnade consisting of 44 square-section columns, each measuring 800 × 800 mm and 14.4 m high: eight on each of the front and rear façades and fourteen on each side façade.

Where the exterior walls meet the roof, beneath the eaves, the building is surrounded by a cornice with a muqarnas effect derived from Turkish carving art. The façades other than the front façade contain waterspouts for rainwater drainage. The yellow travertine used to clad the building was brought from Eskipazar, while the beige travertine used for the lintels, cornices and waterspouts above the columns came from quarries in Kayseri. The white marble floor of the colonnade area contains white rectangular sections corresponding to the spaces between the columns, bordered by strips of red marble. The ceiling of the colonnade contains 40 frescoes, seven on each short side and thirteen on each long side. The frescoes use light gray, terracotta and yellow tones. On the front and rear façades, the space between the two central columns is wider than the others, emphasizing the main entrance to the mausoleum, which has a low-arched white marble door jamb, and the sarcophagus of Atatürk on the same axis. The "Address to the Youth" on the left side of the façade facing the ceremonial square and the "Tenth Year Speech" on the right are inscribed in gold leaf over stone reliefs.

The mausoleum is reached by a staircase 8 m high and consisting of 42 steps. A lectern is located at the center of the staircase. The white marble lectern is decorated on its façade facing the ceremonial square with spiral carvings, and Atatürk's words "Sovereignty unconditionally belongs to the Nation" are carved in its center.

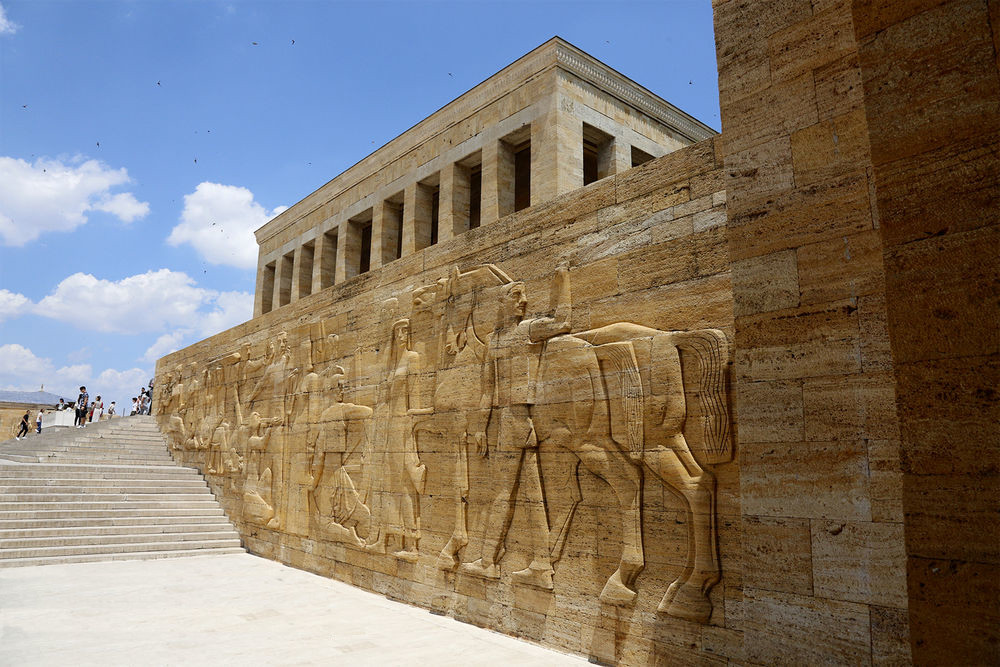
Relief depicting the Battle of Sakarya

To the right and left of the staircase leading to the mausoleum are reliefs depicting the Battle of Sakarya and the Battle of Dumlupınar, respectively. Yellow travertine brought from Eskipazar was used for both reliefs. At the far right of the Battle of Sakarya relief are figures consisting of a young man, two horses, and male and female figures, representing those who left their homes and set out to defend their homeland during the defensive struggle against attacks in the first phase of the battle. The young man turns back toward the direction from which he came and raises his clenched left fist. In front of this group is a mud-covered ox cart, representing the period before the battle, with struggling horses, a man and two women attempting to turn its wheel, as well as a standing man and a kneeling woman offering him a drawn sword. To the left of this group are two seated women and a child, symbolizing the population under occupation awaiting the Turkish army. Above the population is a winged figure of a victory angel, depicted flying and presenting a wreath to Atatürk. At the far left of the composition are a seated woman representing the "Motherland", a kneeling young man representing the Turkish army victorious in the battle, and an oak figure representing victory. Christopher Wilson compared these reliefs with those in Arnaldo Foschini's project.

At the far left of the relief depicting the Battle of Dumlupınar is a group consisting of a peasant woman, a boy and a horse, symbolizing the nation's preparations for the battle. In the section to its right, Atatürk extends one hand forward, indicating the objective to the Turkish army. The angel in front conveys this command into the distance with a trumpet. Two horse figures also appear in this section. The following section depicts the sacrifices and heroism of the Turkish army advancing into battle at Atatürk's command. It includes a man grasping the flag from the hands of a wounded and fallen soldier and a soldier in a trench holding a shield and sword. In the foreground is a victory angel holding the Turkish flag and calling the Turkish army to advance.

Lectern on the staircase leading to the mausoleum building

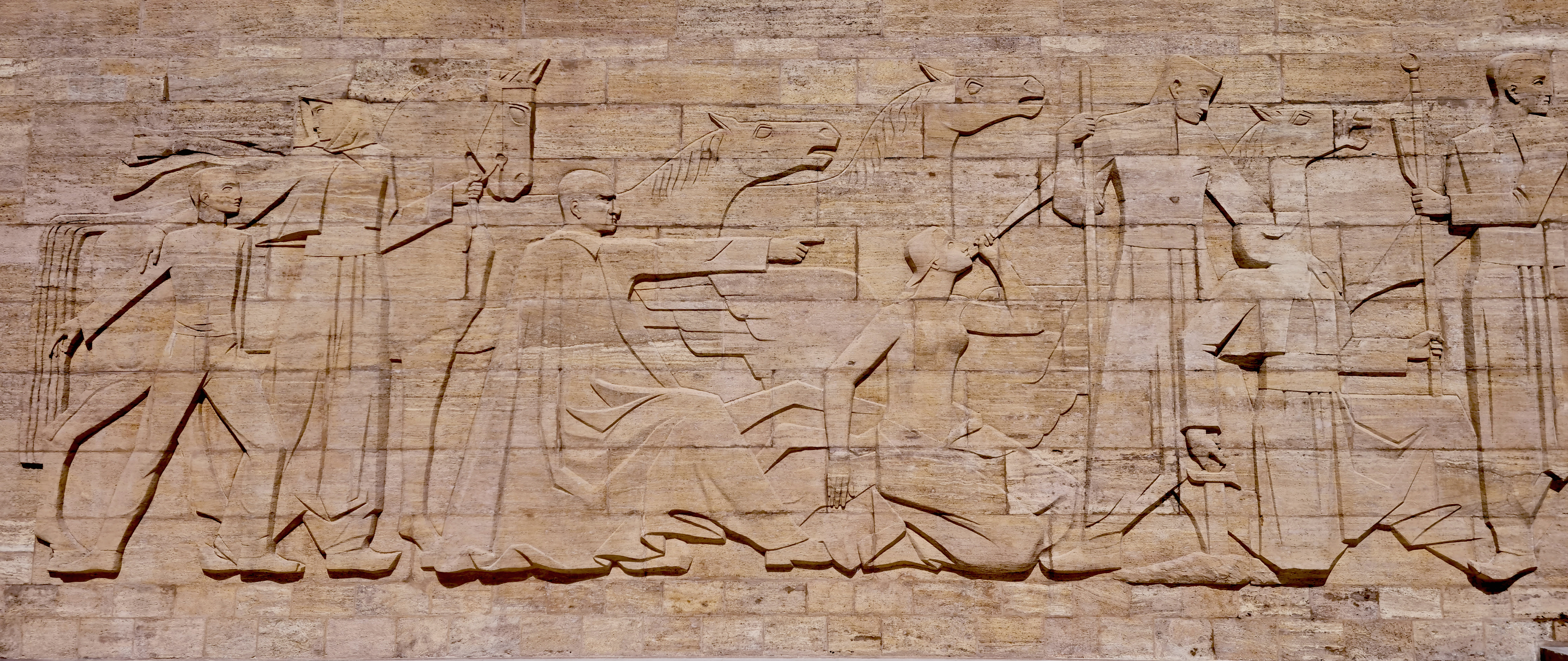
Relief depicting the Battle of Dumlupınar

Text of the "Tenth Year Speech" on the exterior façade

==== Hall of Honor ====
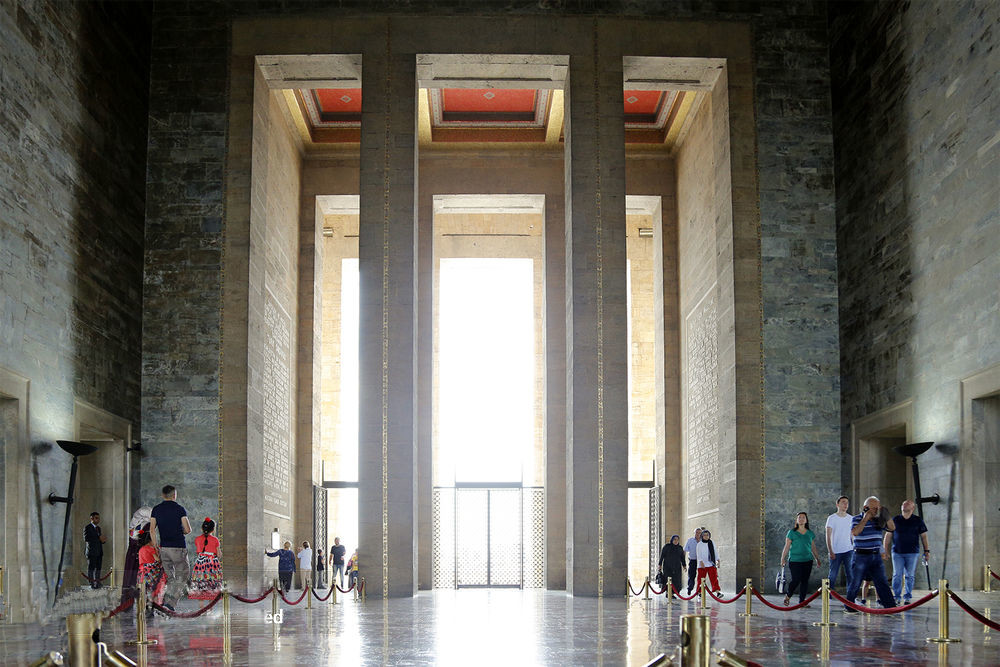
Entrance to the Hall of Honor

The first floor of the building known as the Hall of Honor, which contains Atatürk's symbolic sarcophagus, is entered through a bronze door made by the Veneroni Prezati company, followed by a preparatory space consisting of two rows of colonnades, with the central opening wider than those on the sides. On the interior, Atatürk's final message to the Turkish army, dated 29 October 1938, is displayed on the wall to the right of the door, while İnönü's condolence message to the Turkish nation following Atatürk's death, dated 21 November 1938, is displayed on the wall to the left. Emin Barın's lettering templates were used for both inscriptions. The interior side walls of the Hall of Honor are clad in tiger-skin white marble brought from Afyonkarahisar and green marble brought from Hasandere; the floor and the underside of the vaults are covered with cream marble from Çanakkale, red marble from Hatay, and black marble from Adana. On either side of the columned passage in the preparatory section are strip-like mosaics extending from the ceiling to the floor and framing the entrance, decorated with carpet motifs. In the entrance area, transverse rectangular red marble sections bordered with black marble mark the three entrances to the Hall of Honor after the thresholds. In the central entrance, which is wider than the other two, ram's-horn motifs made of red and black marble are arranged in the four directions of the longitudinal rectangular area at the center of the preparatory section. At the other two entrances, ram's-horn motifs are formed from red marble on black marble in longitudinal rectangular areas at the center of the floor. The side edges of the floor are bordered by an ornament consisting of teeth made of the same material emerging from a red marble strip emphasized by black marble. On the long sides of the rectangular Hall of Honor, a broader version of the edge ornament used in the preparatory section is applied, with black teeth on a red background. Apart from this, a path formed by alternating black and white marble borders the long sides of the Hall of Honor. Outside these borders, five longitudinal rectangular sections are placed at intervals corresponding to the ram's-horn motifs in the entrance area; each contains a pitchfork motif in white marble on a black background.

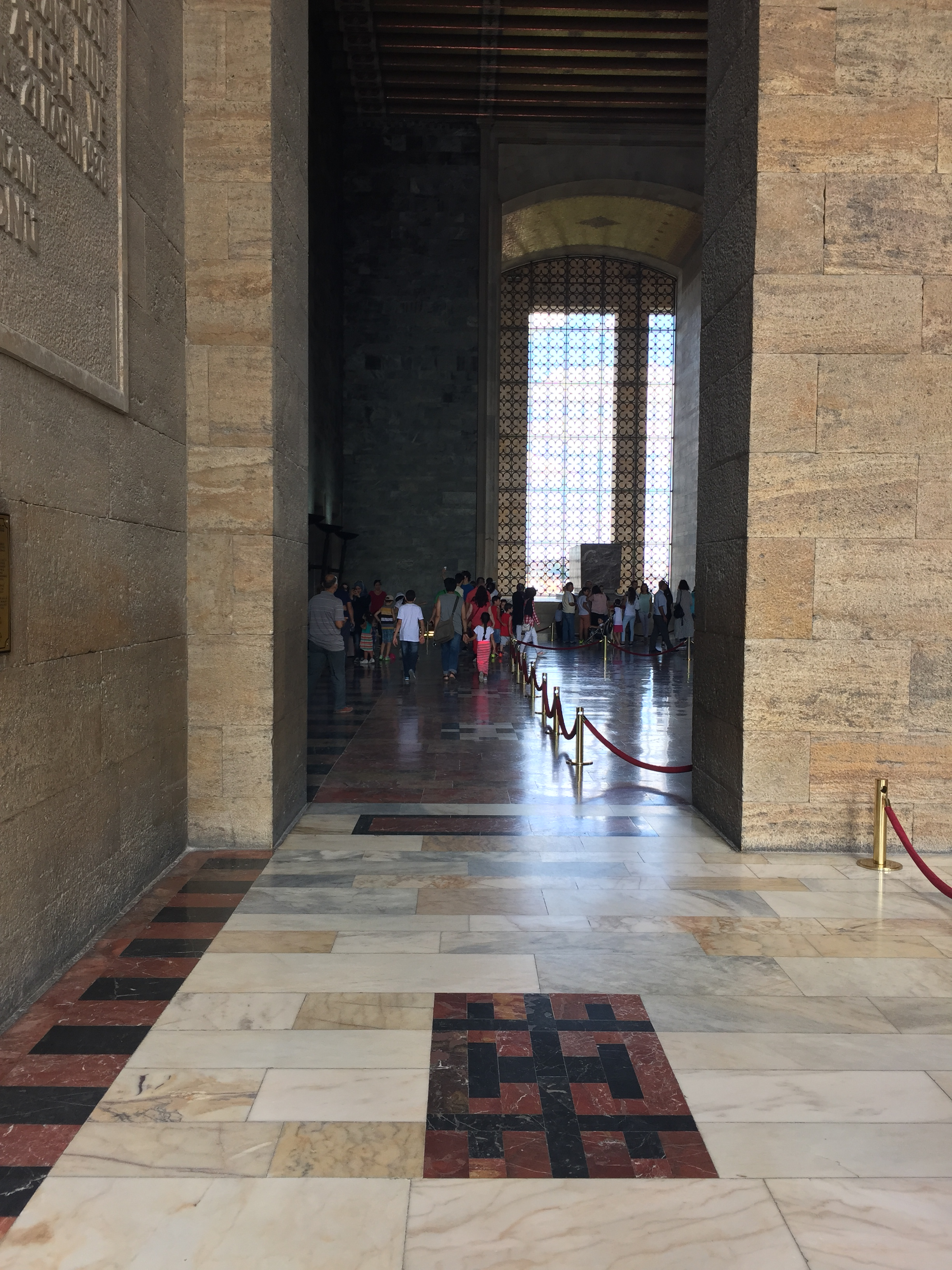
Edge ornament formed by teeth of red marble emerging from the red marble strip along the sides of the Hall of Honor floor

On either side of the Hall of Honor are rectangular galleries measuring 2 × 35 m and 5 m high, with marble floors and nine cross vaults each. The sections between the seven marble-framed openings providing access to these galleries contain a beige marble strip surrounding a central rectangular white marble area, forming ram's-horn motifs on the short sides. The floors of the nine sections of both galleries are decorated according to the same principle, but with different motifs. In the first section of the left gallery, beginning from the entrance, square areas of white marble bordered by beige marble are framed by black marble strips at the four corners, alternating around transverse and longitudinal rectangular borders. In the second section of the same gallery, black marble strips surrounding the central transverse rectangular area curve angularly toward the long sides, forming ram's-horn motifs. The third section contains a composition of ram's-horn motifs formed through narrow and broad applications of black strips. In the fourth section are fragmented, abstract ram's-horn-like motifs made from black marble strips and placed along the short sides of the rectangle. The fifth section contains a checkerboard-like composition of black and white marble. In the sixth section, the black strips surrounding longitudinal rectangular areas at the centers of the long sides curve on the short sides to form ram's-horn motifs. The seventh section contains a composition in which black marble strips placed along the short sides of the rectangular area form pitchfork motifs. In the eighth section, black strips bordering the central longitudinal rectangular area continue along the short and long sides, forming pairs of ram's-horn motifs in four directions, while L-shaped black marble pieces are placed at the corners. In the ninth and final section, strips extending from the central rectangle close off to form rectangular areas in different configurations in the four directions.

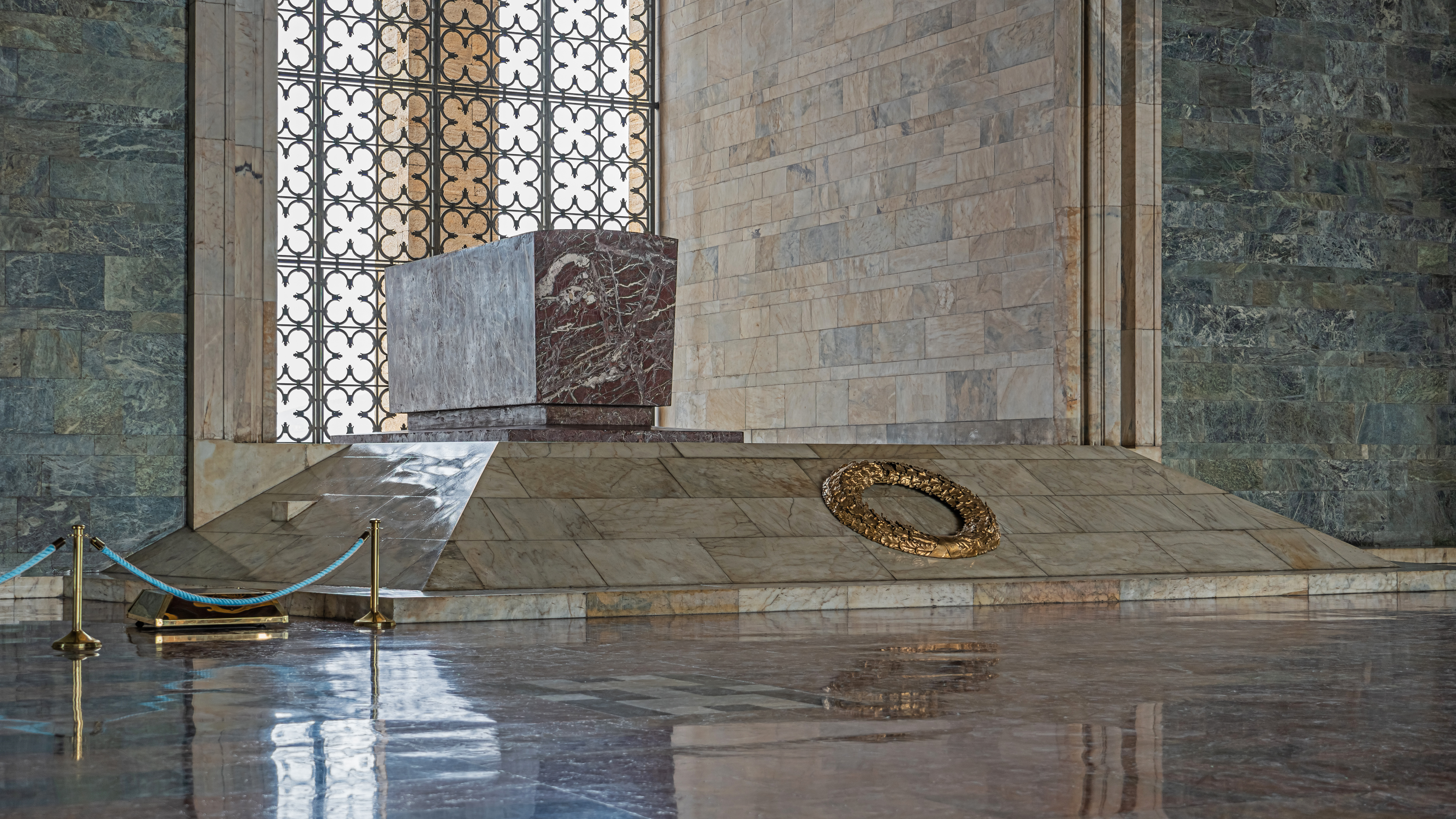
Atatürk's sarcophagus in the Hall of Honor

The first section of the right-hand gallery, viewed from the entrance, has a floor composition in which black strips surrounding the central rectangle form two pairs of ram's horns. In the second section, two ram's-horn motifs made from black marble strips are placed along the long sides, with their backs turned toward one another and connected by a central strip perpendicular to them. In the third section, black marble strips following the central square at the top and bottom form ram's horns along the long sides. In the fourth section, strips emerging from the corners of a transverse rectangle with a square of white marble at its center form ram's-horn motifs. In the fifth section, pitchfork motifs are carved in black marble at each corner of the square. In the sixth section, black marble strips along the edges of the square symmetrically form a ram's horn on each side. In the seventh section, black marble strips create a composition with pitchfork motifs. In the eighth section, the ram's-horn motifs above and below the square are joined by black marble strips to create a different arrangement. In the ninth and final section, the horizontal black marble strips above and below the square form ram's-horn motifs.

The Hall of Honor contains 22 windows in total, 18 of which are fixed and four of which are doors, as well as a larger window directly opposite the entrance, facing Ankara Castle and directly behind the sarcophagus. The bronze grilles of this window form a clover-leaf motif from four crescent-shaped pieces joined in pairs and fastened to one another with clamps and wedges; the motif is in turn interlocked with the adjacent leaf motif. The sarcophagus, 1.4 m wide at the bottom, 1.5 m wide at the top, 3.45 m long and 1.62 m high, is elevated above the floor inside a niche whose walls and floor are clad in white marble brought from Afyonkarahisar and which contains the large window. The sarcophagus was made from two monolithic pieces of red marble, each weighing 40 tonnes, brought from the Gavur Mountains (Nur Mountains) in Bahçe.

The ceiling of the Hall of Honor, consisting of 27 beams, the surfaces of the cross vaults covering the galleries, and the gallery ceilings are decorated with mosaics. Twelve bronze torches, six on each side, are mounted on the side walls of the Hall of Honor. The building is covered by a flat lead roof.

Atatürk's final message to the Turkish army, dated 29 October 1938, to the right of the entrance door

İnönü's condolence message, dated 21 November 1938, following Atatürk's death, to the left of the entrance door

Openings leading to the galleries on the sides of the Hall of Honor

The niche containing the sarcophagus and the mosaic ceiling decorations

A window in the Hall of Honor

Ceiling of the Hall of Honor

One of the torches in the Hall of Honor

Mosaics on the columns in the preparatory section

==== Burial chamber ====
The corridors on the ground floor of the building are covered with cross vaults and open onto iwan-like spaces with barrel vault ceilings. Atatürk's remains are located directly beneath the symbolic sarcophagus, in a grave dug directly into the earth in the octagonal burial chamber on this floor. The ceiling of the chamber is covered by a pyramid-shaped cupola pierced by an octagonal skylight, from each corner of which golden-colored light emanates. The sarcophagus at the center of the chamber faces the qibla and is enclosed within an octagonal area. Brass vases surrounding the marble sarcophagus contain soil brought from all 81 provinces of Turkey, the Turkish Republic of Northern Cyprus, and Azerbaijan. Inside the grave are also soils taken from the 67 provinces of Turkey that existed at the time of Atatürk's burial; from the garden of Atatürk's birthplace in Thessaloniki; from the section of the United Nations Memorial Cemetery in Busan, South Korea, where Turkish soldiers are buried; and from the Tomb of Suleyman Shah, located in an exclave of Turkish territory in Syria. The chamber's floor and walls are clad in marble and decorated with mosaics.

=== Road of Lions ===
The 262.2 m-long and 12.8 m-wide avenue extending from the entrance of Anıtkabir to the ceremonial square along a northwest–southeast axis is known as the Road of Lions because of the lion statues on both sides. It is reached after a 26-step staircase, 4 m high, commemorating 26 August 1922, the date on which the Great Offensive of the Turkish War of Independence began. On either side of the road are 24 marble lion statues, each mounted on a 40 cm-high pedestal and seated in a manner intended to convey "a sense of strength and tranquility", representing the 24 Oghuz tribes. The statues are arranged in pairs to represent "the unity and solidarity of the Turkish nation". Hüseyin Anka Özkan was inspired by the Hittite statue known as the Maraş lion at the Istanbul Archaeology Museums when creating the statues. red cedars (Juniperus virginiana) and roses line both sides of the road. Beige travertine brought from Kayseri is used for the paving, with 5 cm gaps filled with grass between each stone tile. At the beginning of the Road of Lions are the Independence and Freedom towers, with male and female statue groups respectively in front of them. The road connects to the ceremonial square via a six-step staircase at its end.

Staircase at the entrance to the Road of Lions, with the Freedom (left) and Independence towers

View of the Road of Lions toward the ceremonial square

View of the Road of Lions toward the entrance of Anıtkabir

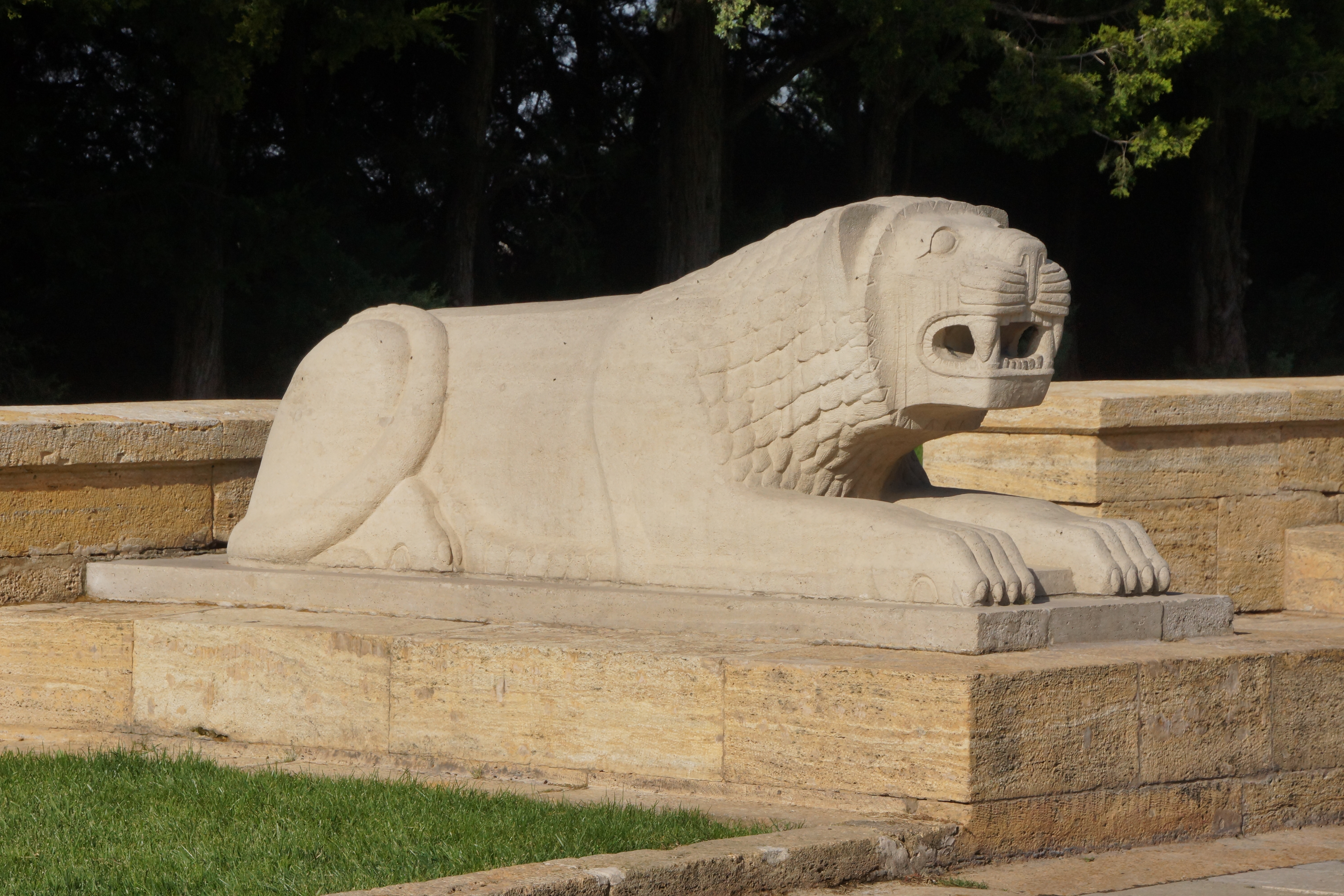
One of the lion statues

Roses and red cedars along both sides of the Road of Lions

=== Male and female statue groups ===
In front of the Freedom Tower is a group of three male statues expressing "the deep sorrow felt by Turkish men over Atatürk's death". The statues are placed on a pedestal. The figure on the right, wearing a helmet and greatcoat and without rank insignia, represents the Turkish soldier; the figure beside him holding a book represents Turkish youth and intellectuals; and the figure behind them, wearing a woolen cap and felt yamçı and holding a staff in his left hand, represents the Turkish people.

In front of the Independence Tower is a group of three female statues expressing "the deep sorrow felt by Turkish women over Atatürk's death". The two figures on the sides, dressed in national clothing and seated on a pedestal, each hold a wreath extending to the ground and made of sheaves of grain, representing the fertility of Turkey. The figure on the right prays for God's mercy for Atatürk with a bowl held in her outstretched hand, while the central female figure covers her tearful face with one hand. Both statue groups are approximately 6 m high, including their 1 m-high pedestals.

Male statue group

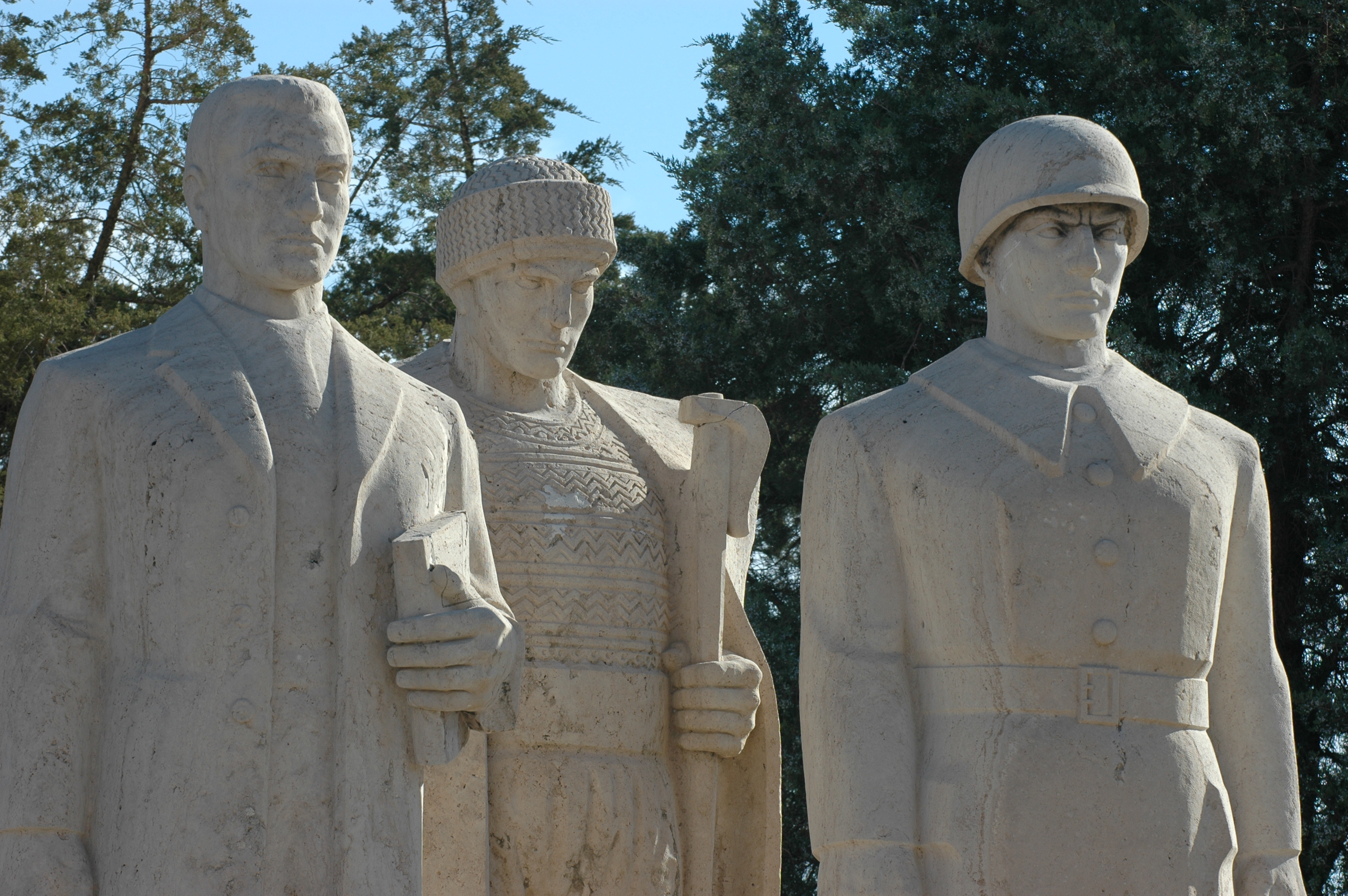
Facial details of the male statue group

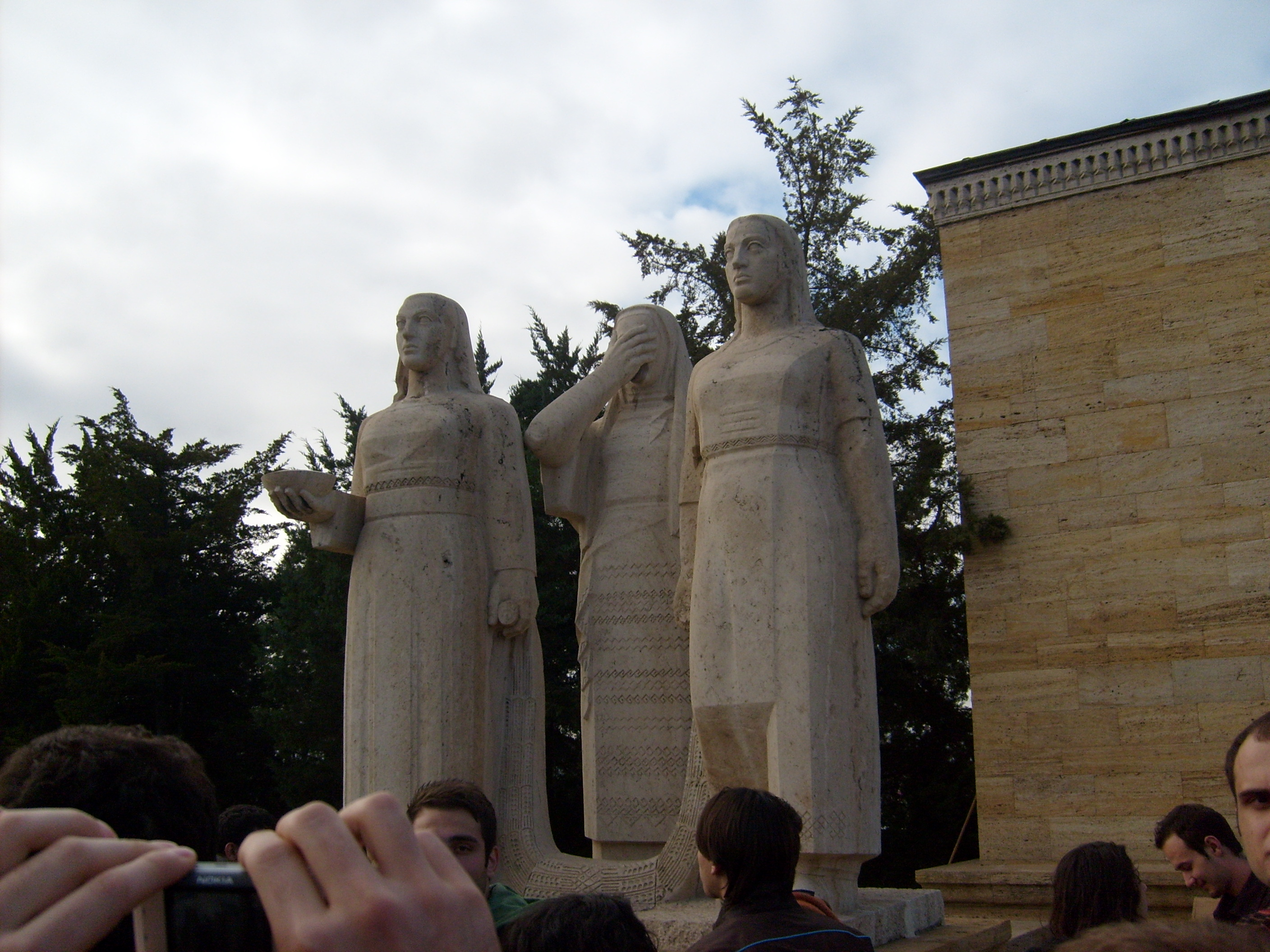
Female statue group

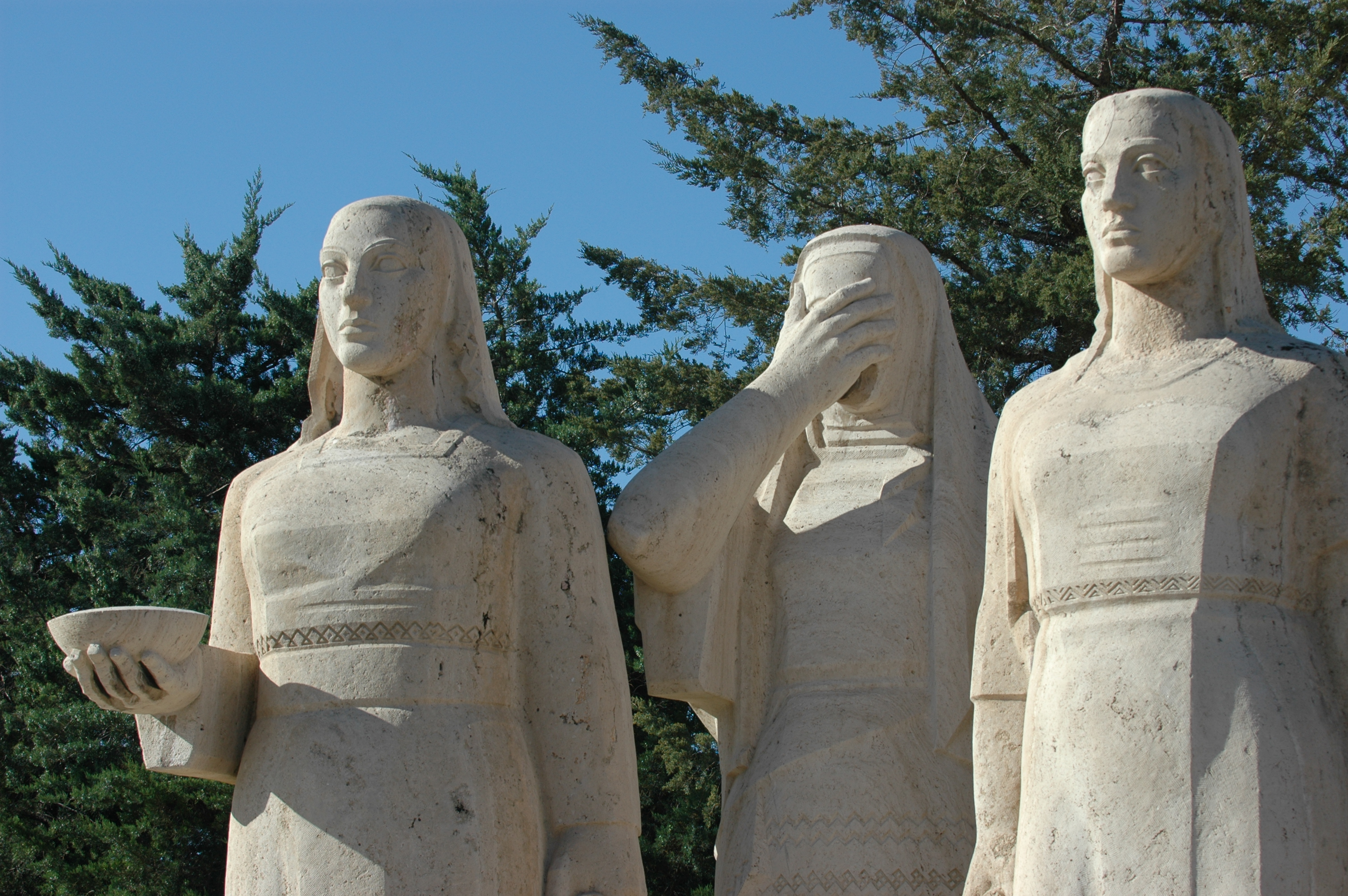
Facial details of the female statue group

=== Towers ===
The ten towers of Anıtkabir have rectangular plans measuring 8.8 × 10.85 m and are 7.2 m high. Their roofs consist of pyramid-shaped structures with mirrored vaults on the inside and a bronze alem at the apex of each roof in the form of a spearhead. The alems have designs resembling traditional Turkish nomadic tents found in the Turkish countryside and in Central Asian Turkish settlements. The interior and exterior façades of the towers are clad in yellow travertine brought from Eskipazar, while their ceilings contain frescoes made with Turkish carpet and rug motifs, each tower featuring a different design. The arched white-stone pediments above their doors and windows, which are framed with white stone jambs, contain colorful mosaics with different patterns based on old Turkish geometric ornamentation. The exterior façades contain cornices made of Turkish carving work and beige travertine from Kayseri, running around all four sides beneath the eaves, together with waterspouts for rainwater drainage.

==== Independence Tower ====
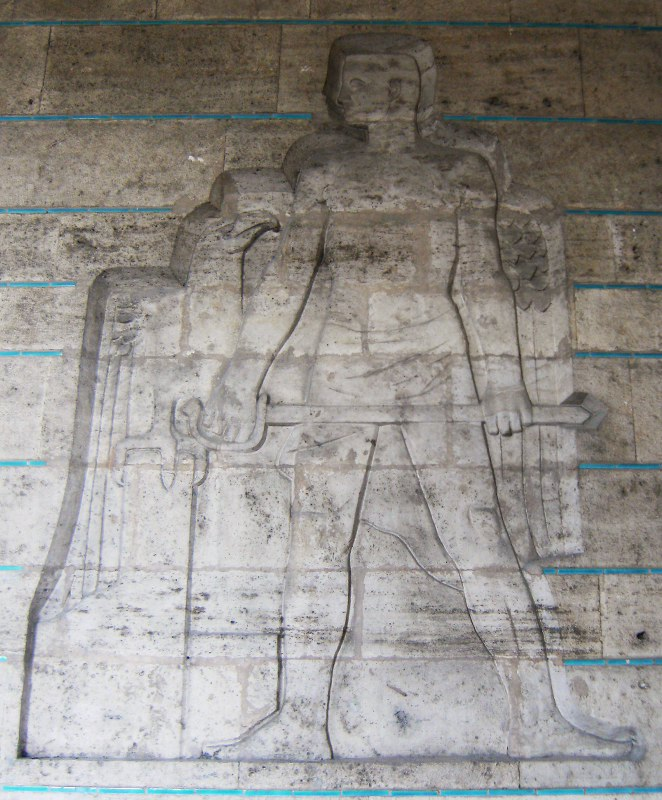
Relief on the interior wall of the Independence Tower

The Independence Tower, located to the right of the entrance to the Road of Lions, has a red stone floor divided into rectangles by yellow stone strips. The relief on the interior of the wall to the left of the tower entrance depicts a standing man holding a sword with both hands and an eagle perched on a rock beside him. The eagle represents strength and independence, while the male figure represents the army, the strength and power of the Turkish nation. Fourteen horizontal rows of turquoise tile are placed between the joints of the travertine inside the tower, with a single row along the edges of the window frames. The walls contain the following quotations by Atatürk concerning independence, written as an inscriptional border:

- "When our nation seemed to be coming to an end through the most terrible collapse, the ancestral voice calling its children to rise against captivity rose within our hearts and summoned us to the final struggle for liberation." (1921)
- "Life means struggle, it means conflict. Success in life is possible only through success in struggle." (1927)
- "We are a nation that desires life and independence, and we devote our lives solely and exclusively to this." (1921)
- "There is no principle of begging for justice and mercy. The Turkish nation and the future children of Turkey must never forget this." (1927)
- "This nation has never lived without independence, cannot live without it, and will not live without it. Either independence or death!" (1919)

==== Freedom Tower ====
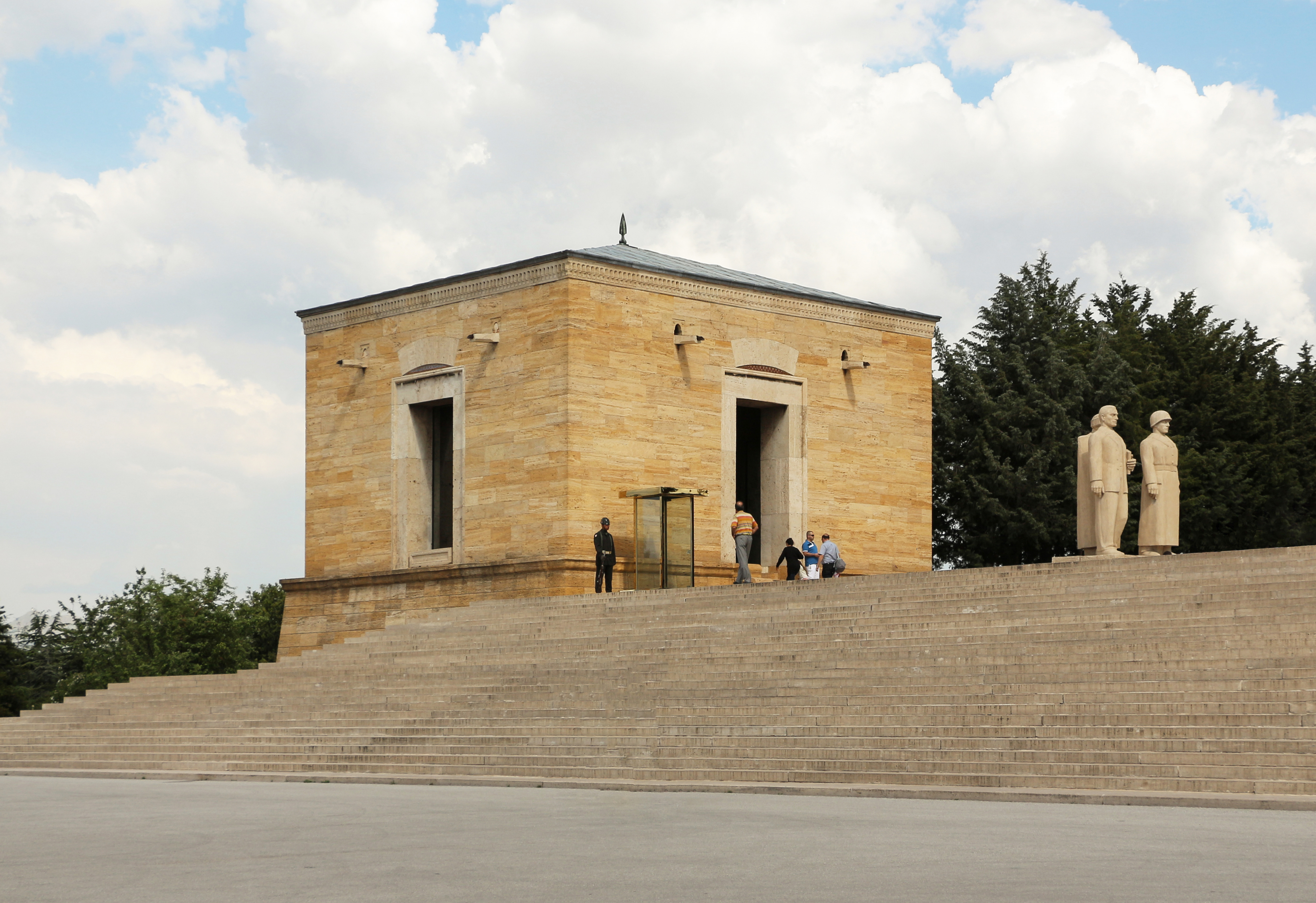
The Freedom Tower and the male statue group in front of it

The Freedom Tower, located to the left of the entrance to the Road of Lions and identical in dimensions to the Independence Tower, has a red stone floor divided into rectangles by yellow stone strips. The relief on the interior of the wall to the right of the tower entrance depicts an angel holding a sheet of paper and a rearing horse beside her. The angel, depicted as a standing girl, symbolizes the sanctity of independence together with the paper in her right hand representing the "Declaration of Freedom". The horse is also a symbol of freedom and independence. The tower contains an exhibition of photographs documenting the construction of Anıtkabir, together with samples of the stones used in its construction. The walls contain the following quotations by Atatürk concerning freedom:

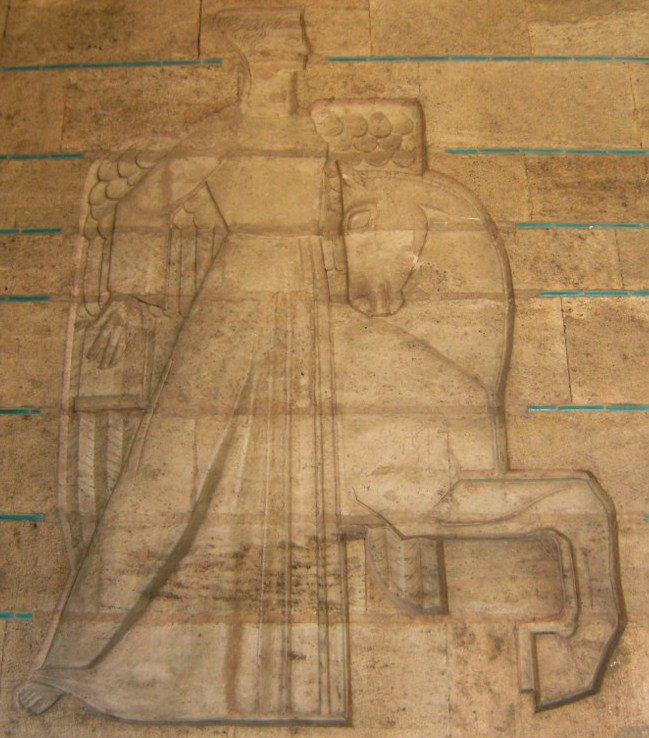
Relief on the interior wall of the Freedom Tower

- "The essential thing is for the Turkish nation to live as a dignified and honorable nation. This can be ensured only through complete independence. No matter how rich and prosperous a nation may be, if deprived of independence it cannot earn a status higher than that of a servant before civilized humanity." (1927)
- "In my view, the existence and preservation of honor, dignity, morality and humanity in a nation necessarily depend on that nation possessing freedom and independence." (1921)
- "It is national sovereignty upon which freedom, equality and justice rest." (1923)
- "Throughout our entire historical life, we have been a nation that has symbolized freedom and independence." (1927)

==== Mehmetçik Tower ====
View of the Mehmetçik Tower

The Mehmetçik Tower, located to the right of the point where the Road of Lions reaches the ceremonial square, has a red stone floor with black diagonal strips extending from the corners and forming two intersecting diagonals at the center]. The relief on the exterior façade depicts the departure of a Turkish soldier (Mehmetçik) for the front. The composition shows a mother placing her hand on the shoulder of her soldier son as she sends him off to fight for his homeland. Fourteen horizontal rows of turquoise tiles are placed between the joints of the travertine inside the tower, with a single row along the edges of the window frames. Various applications of a rose-rosette motif appear on the walls of the Museum Directorate section. A boss motif is applied to the lintel of the entrance door. The walls of the tower contain the following quotations by Atatürk concerning Turkish soldiers the corners and forming two intersecting diagonals at the center. The relief on the exterior wall of the tower depicts the defense of national rights during the Turkish War of Independence. It shows a nude male figure holding a sword in one hand, its tip resting on the ground, while extending his other hand forward and saying "Stop!" to an enemy attempting to cross the borders. The tree beneath the outstretched hand represents Turkey, while the male figure protecting it represents the nation united for the purpose of and women:

- "The heroic Turkish soldier understood the meaning of the Anatolian battles and fought with a new ideal." (1921)
- "Nowhere in the world, in no nation, is it possible to speak of women's labor surpassing that of the Anatolian peasant woman." (1923)
- "There can be no standard by which to measure the sacrifices and heroism of the children of this nation."

==== Defense of Rights Tower ====
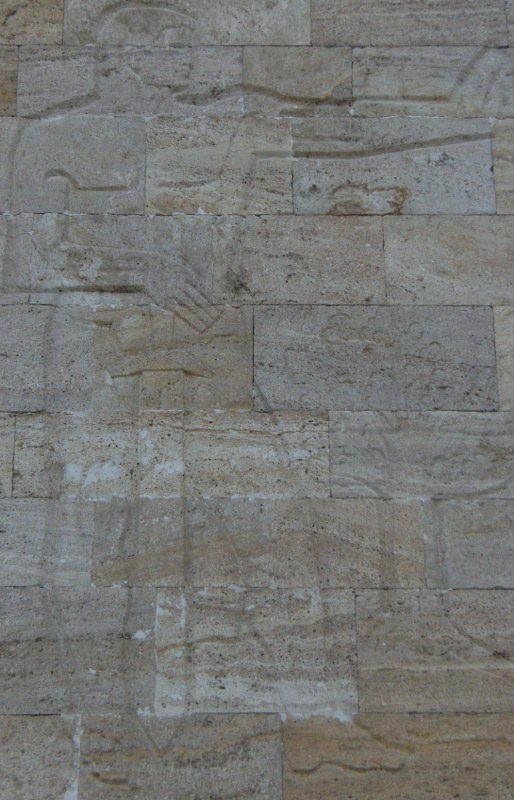
Relief on the exterior façade of the Defense of Rights Tower

The Defense of Rights Tower, located to the left of the point where the Road of Lions reaches the ceremonial square, has a red stone floor with black diagonal strips extending from the corners and forming two intersecting diagonals at the center. The relief on the exterior wall of the tower depicts the defense of national rights during the Turkish War of Independence. It shows a nude male figure holding a sword in one hand, its tip resting on the ground, while extending his other hand forward and saying "Stop!" to an enemy attempting to cross the borders. The tree beneath the outstretched hand represents Turkey, while the male figure protecting it represents the nation united for the purpose of liberation. The tower walls contain the following quotations by Atatürk concerning the defense of rights:

- "The principle is to make the National Forces effective and to make the national will sovereign." (1919)
- "From now on, the nation itself will be the guardian of its life, independence and entire existence." (1923)
- "History can never deny the blood, rights or existence of a nation." (1919)
- "The most fundamental and evident desire and faith arising from and inspired by the heart and conscience of the Turkish nation had become known: liberation." (1927)

==== Victory Tower ====
Carpet-patterned fresco on the ceiling of the Victory Tower

The Victory Tower, located at the right corner of the ceremonial square on the Road of Lions side, has a red floor with a central rectangular area bordered by black strips. The strips cross diagonally at the center. A black triangle is placed in each of the three triangular areas formed within the rectangle. Along each side of the rectangle is a motif resembling a reversed "M". Fourteen horizontal rows of turquoise tiles are placed between the joints of the travertine inside the tower, with a single row along the edges of the window frames. A boss motif is applied to the lintel of the entrance door. Inside the tower are the cannon and carriage that transported Atatürk located at the far corner of the ceremonial square opposite the Victory Tower, has a red floor with a central rectangular area bordered by black strips. The strips cross diagonally at the center. A black triangle is placed in each of the's body from Dolmabahçe Palace on 19 November 1938 and delivered it to the navy at Sarayburnu. The walls contain the following quotations by Atatürk concerning some of his military victories:

- "The lasting results of victories can only be ensured by an army of enlightenment." (1923)
- "This homeland is a land worthy of being made a paradise for our children and descendants." (1923)
- "There is no line of defense, there is an area of defense. That area is the entire homeland. Every inch of the homeland cannot be abandoned until it has been soaked with the blood of its citizens." (1921)

==== Peace Tower ====
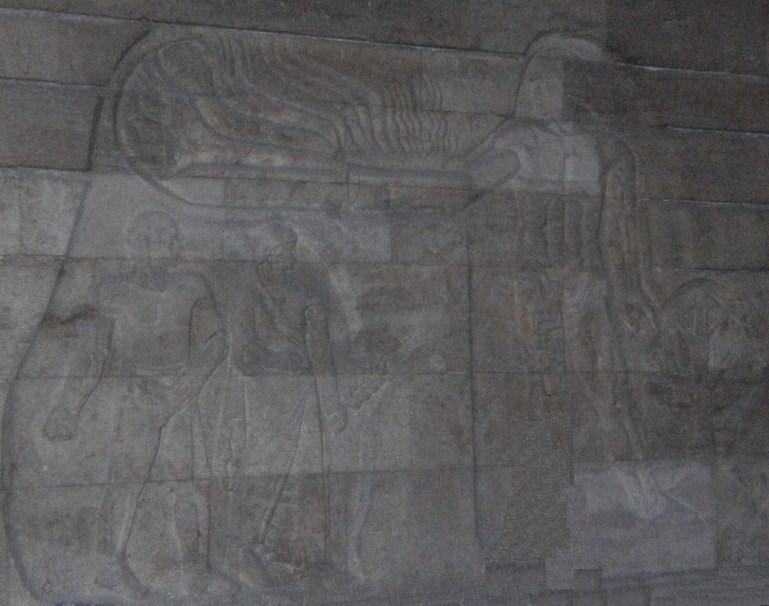
Relief on the interior façade of the Peace Tower

The Peace Tower, located at the far corner of the ceremonial square opposite the Victory Tower, has a red floor with a central rectangular area bordered by black strips. The strips cross diagonally at the center. A black triangle is placed in each of the three triangular areas formed within the rectangle. Along each side of the rectangle is a motif resembling a reversed "M". The exterior of the wall facing the western portico contains a birdhouse. The interior wall contains a relief illustrating Atatürk's principle of "Peace at home, peace in the world", depicting farmers engaged in agriculture, fields and trees, together with a soldier extending his sword beside them. The soldier, representing the Turkish army, protects the citizens. The tower contains the Lincoln automobiles used by Atatürk as ceremonial and official cars between 1935 and 1938. The walls contain the following quotations by Atatürk concerning peace:

- "The citizens of the world should be educated so as to distance themselves from envy, greed and hatred." (1935)
- "Peace at home, peace in the world."
- "Unless the life of the nation is endangered, war is murder." (1923)

==== 23 April Tower ====
The 23 April Tower, located to the right of the staircase leading out of the ceremonial square, has a red stone floor with black diagonal strips extending from the corners and forming two intersecting diagonals at the center. The relief on its interior wall depicts the opening of the Grand National Assembly of Turkey on 23 April 1920. It shows a standing woman holding a key in one hand and a sheet of paper in the other. The paper bears the date "23 April 1920", while the key symbolizes the opening of the assembly. The tower contains the Cadillac automobile used by Atatürk between 1936 and 1938. The walls contain the following quotations by Atatürk concerning the opening of the assembly:

- "There was only one decision: to establish a new Turkish state, independent without conditions or restrictions, based on national sovereignty." (1919)
- "The sole and true representative of the State of Turkey is the Grand National Assembly of Turkey, and only the Grand National Assembly of Turkey." (1922)
- "Our point of view is that strength, power, sovereignty and administration should be given directly to the people and remain in the hands of the people." (1920)

==== National Pact Tower ====
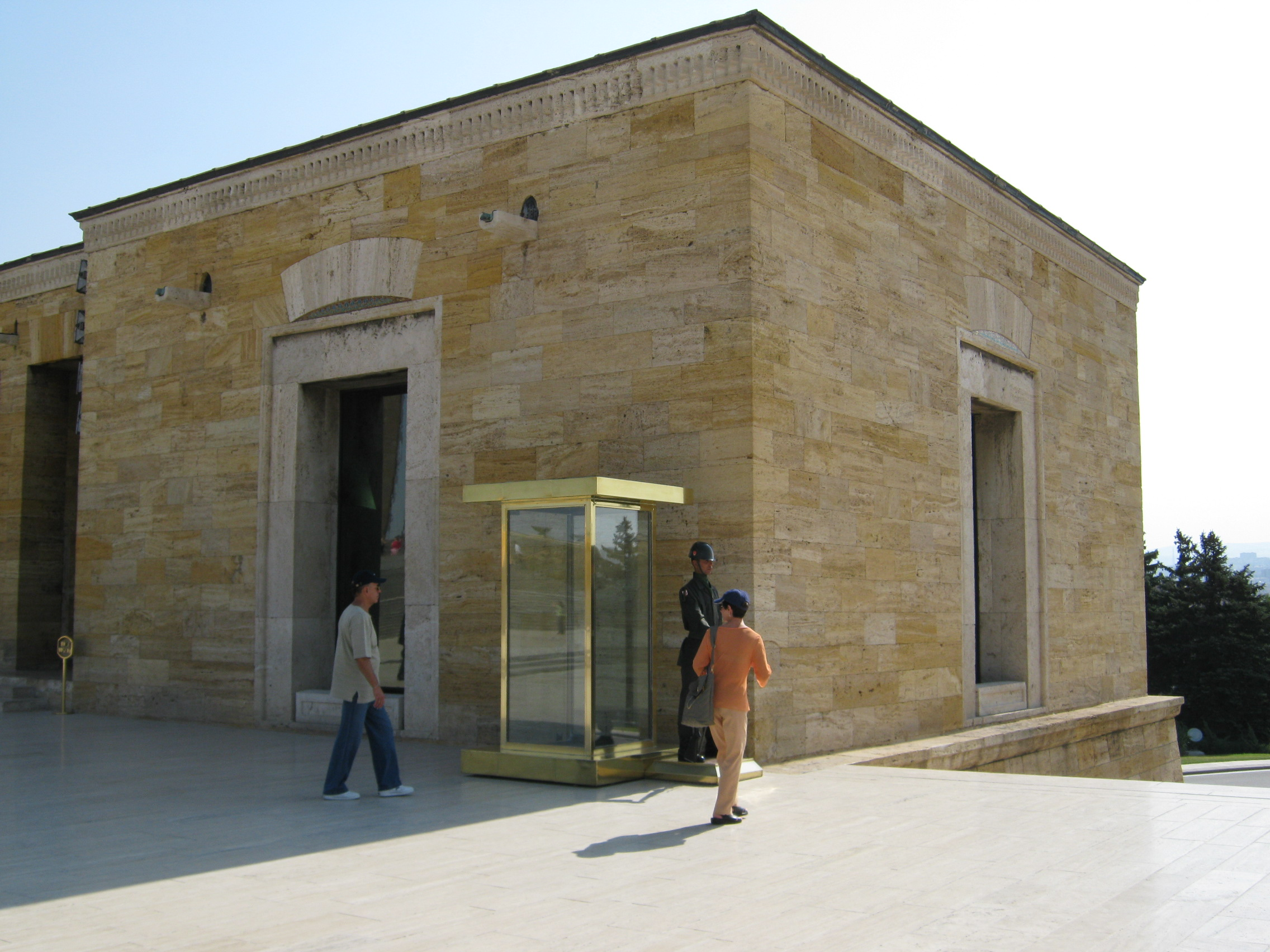
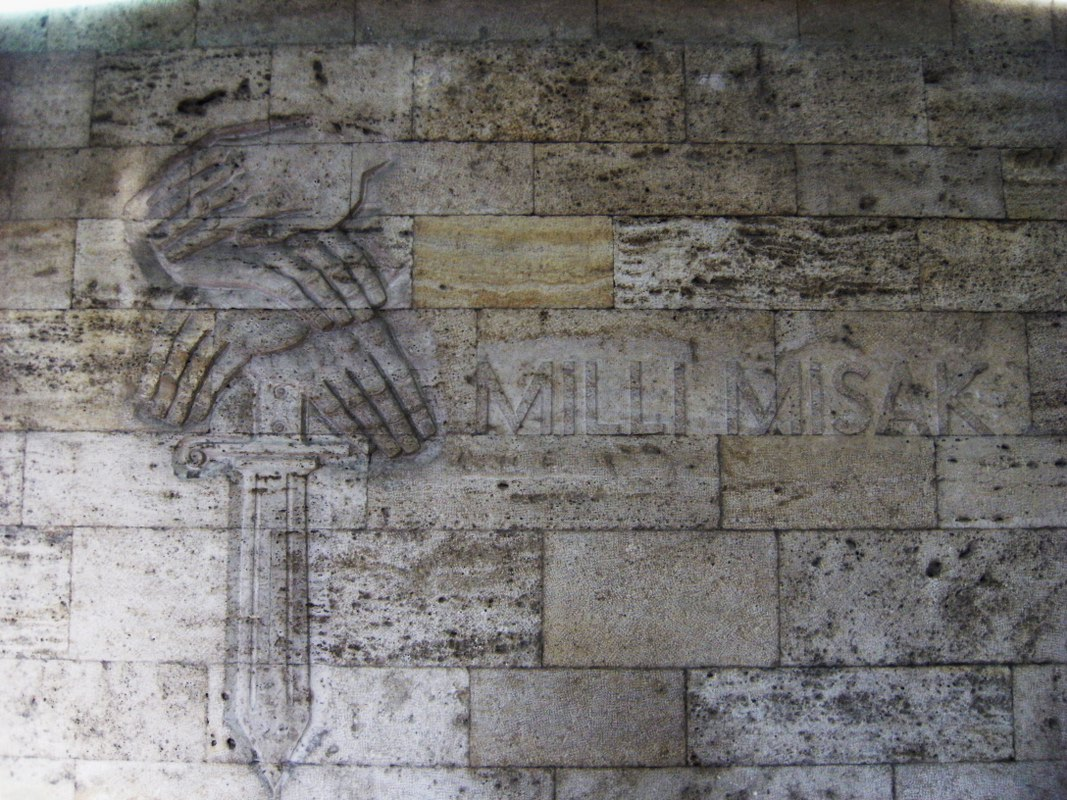
Entrance of the National Pact Tower (top) and relief on the exterior façade of the tower

The National Pact Tower, located to the left of the staircase leading out of the ceremonial square, has a red stone floor with black diagonal strips extending from the corners and forming two intersecting diagonals at the center. The relief on the exterior wall of the tower depicts four hands placed one above another on the hilt of a sword. This composition symbolizes the nation swearing an oath to liberate the homeland. The walls contain the following quotations by Atatürk concerning the National Pact:

- "It is the iron hand of the nation that wrote the National Pact, our doctrine of liberation, into the pages of history." (1923)
- "We wish to live freely and independently within our national borders." (1921)
- "Nations that have not found their national identity become the prey of other nations." (1923)

==== Revolution Tower ====
The Revolution Tower, located to the right of the mausoleum, has a rectangular area at the center of its red floor bordered by black stone on the short sides and red stone on the long sides. The edges of the space are bounded by a comb motif formed from a strip of black stone. The relief on the interior wall depicts two torches held by individual hands. The extinguishing torch held by a weak and powerless hand symbolizes the declining Ottoman Empire, while the other torch, held aloft by a strong hand and emitting light toward the sky, symbolizes the newly established Republic of Turkey and the reforms carried out by Atatürk to bring the Turkish nation to the level of contemporary civilization. The tower walls contain the following quotations by Atatürk concerning the reforms:

- "If a society does not advance toward the same goal together with all its women and men, there is no scientific possibility or likelihood of progress and civilization." (1923)
- "We have received our inspiration not from the heavens or the unknown, but directly from life itself." (1937)

==== Republic Tower ====
The Republic Tower, located to the left of the mausoleum, has a central rectangular black section on its red stone floor surrounded by black strips forming a carpet motif. A birdhouse is located on the exterior side of one of the tower's side walls. The interior wall contains the following quotation by Atatürk concerning the republic:

- "Our greatest strength, our most secure support, is that we have understood national sovereignty, placed it effectively in the hands of the people, and actually proved that we can keep it in the hands of the people."

=== Ceremonial Square ===
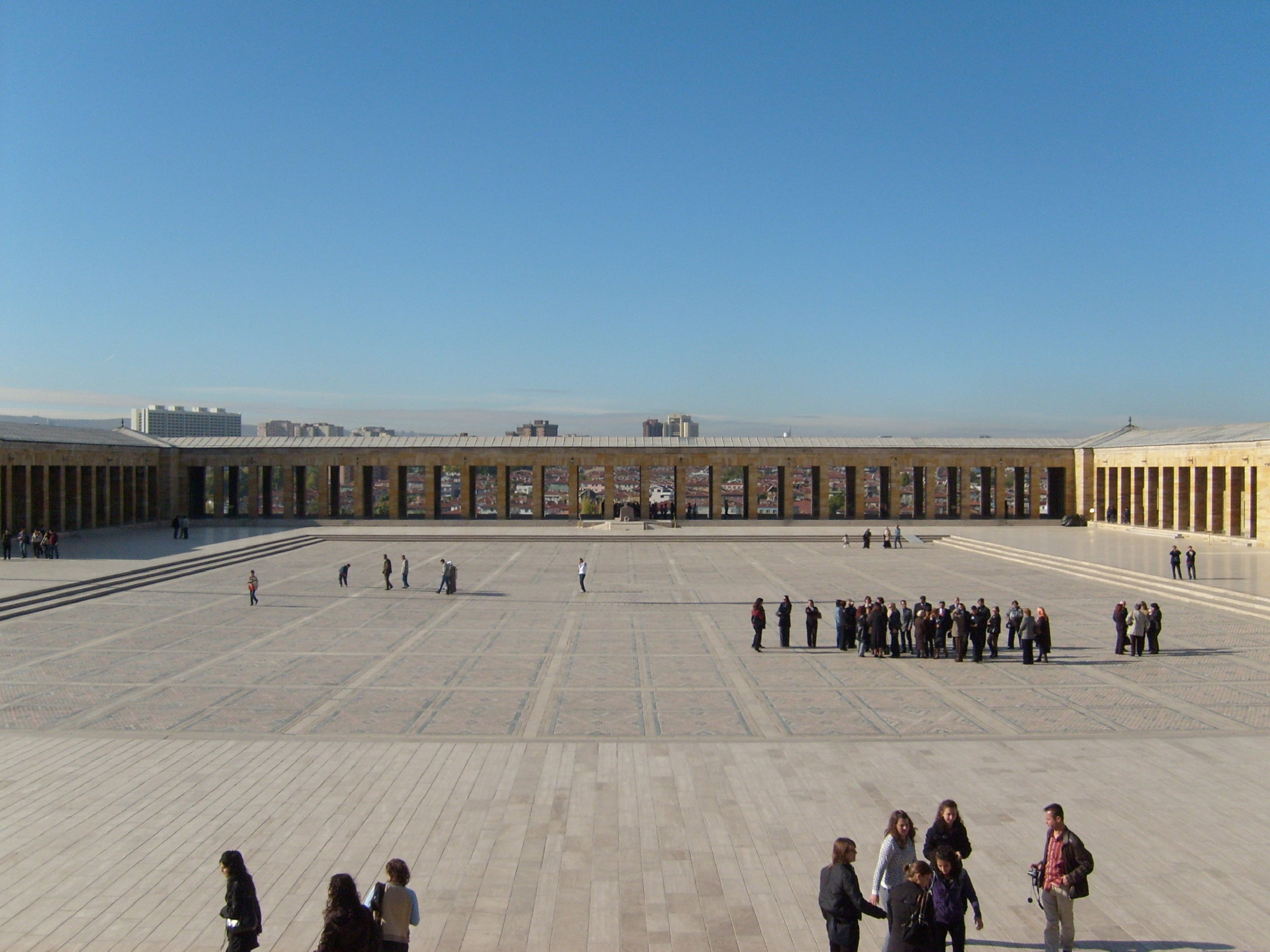
The ceremonial square

The ceremonial square at the end of the Road of Lions, with a capacity of 15,000 people, is a rectangular area measuring 129 × 84.25 m. The floor is divided into 373 rectangles, each paved with cube-shaped black, yellow, red and beige travertine arranged to form Turkish carpet and rug motifs. At the center of the square, within an area bounded by black travertine, is a composition in which a rhombus formed from red and black travertine is surrounded by black stone pitchfork motifs, bordered by red stones and arranged along the long sides of the broad edge ornament. The short sides of the same border ornament, whose floor consists of half-rhombuses, are filled with single or paired "cross" motifs. In all of the smaller rectangular sections surrounded by black travertine, a complete rhombus is placed at the center and a half-rhombus at the midpoint of each side. Red strips extending diagonally from the complete rhombus of red stones surrounding the central black stones form diagonal lines.

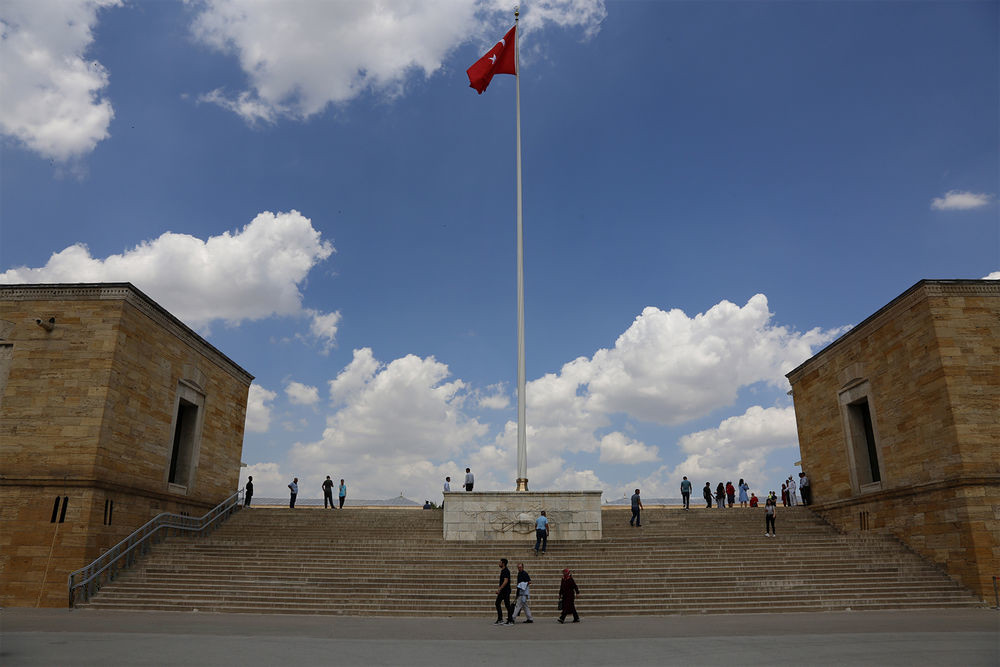
The entrance leading to Anıtkabir's ceremonial plaza and the Turkish flag

The square is accessed by three-step staircases descending on all four sides. Three sides of the ceremonial area are surrounded by porticoes clad in yellow travertine brought from Eskipazar. The floors of the porticoes contain alternating rectangular sections formed by black travertine bordered with yellow travertine. In the porticoes along the long sides of the ceremonial square, each of these rectangles is located at the level of a window or doorway opening onto the portico; in the double-colonnade sections, they are located between each pair of columns. The ground floors of the porticoes, which contain vaulted galleries, have rectangular windows. Within the ceiling coffers of the porticoes connecting the towers, Turkish carpet motifs are centered on two separate ram's-horn motifs. In the centers of the frames surrounded by ram's-horn designs is a rectangular section repeated 11 times in the colonnade between each pair of towers. The ceiling frescoes in the colonnade between the Victory and Peace towers are repeated 25 times; the two ram's-horn motifs in the central rectangular section are joined together and arranged as a motif distinct from those in the other colonnades. A total of 69 frescoes decorate the ceilings of the colonnades, using light and dark yellow, terracotta, burgundy, white and dark gray.

At the center of the 28-step staircase at the entrance to the ceremonial square on the Çankaya side stands a steel flagpole, 29.53 m high, with a base diameter of 440 mm and a top diameter of 115 mm, from which the Turkish flag flies. The relief on the base of the flagpole was designed by Kenan Yontunç, while its execution on the base was carried out by Nusret Suman. The relief consists of allegorical figures: the torch symbolizes civilization, the sword symbolizes attack, the helmet symbolizes defense, the oak branch symbolizes victory, and the olive branch symbolizes peace.

Carpet motifs on the floor of the ceremonial square

Carpet motifs on the floor of the ceremonial square

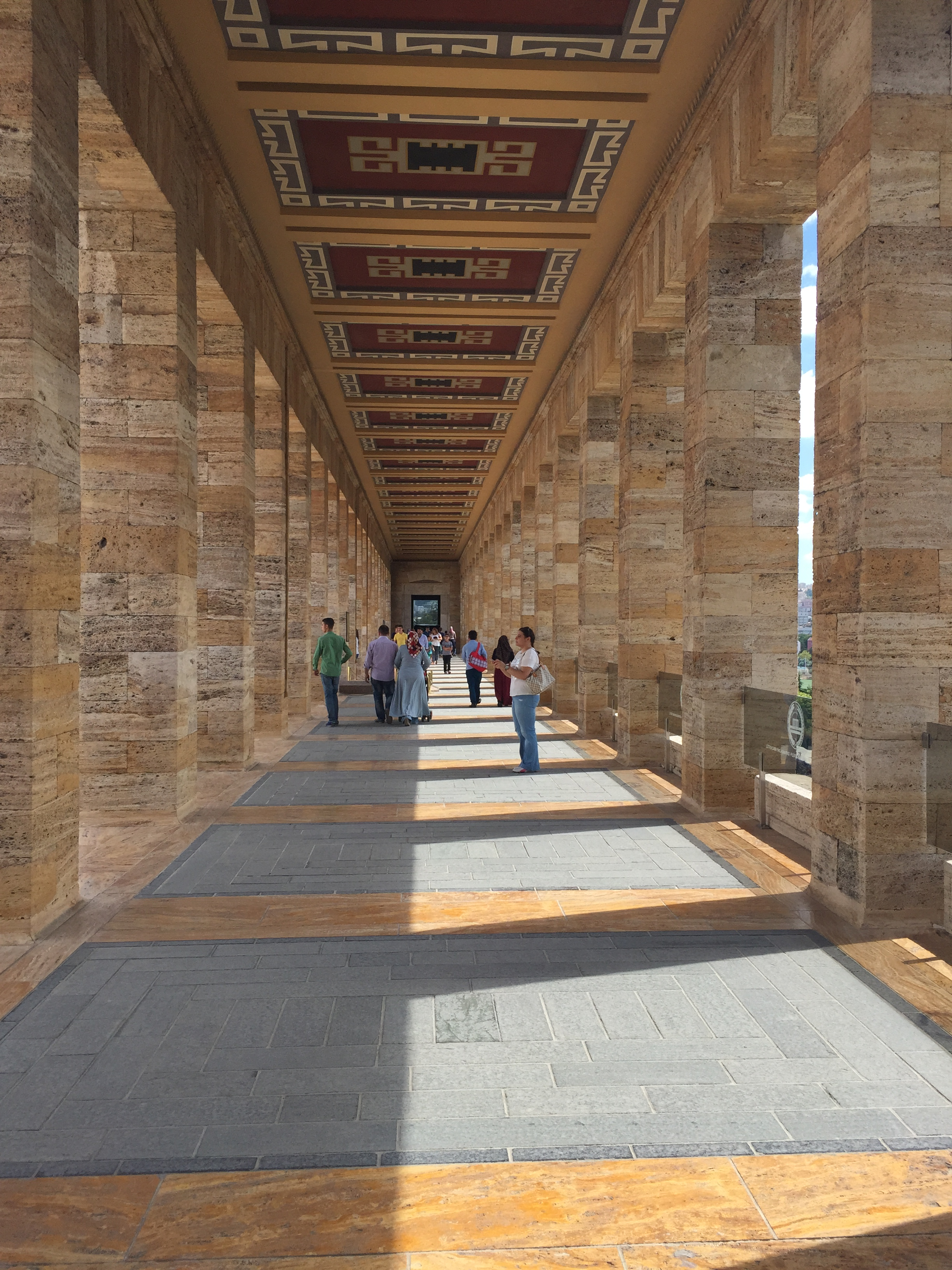
Interior of the porticoes surrounding the square

Exterior view of the porticoes surrounding the square

Base of the flagpole and the relief on it

=== İsmet İnönü's Sarcophagus ===
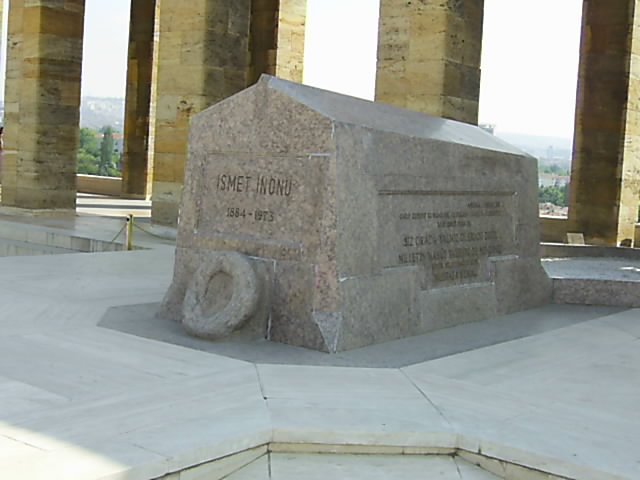
Sarcophagus of İsmet İnönü

The symbolic sarcophagus of İsmet İnönü is located between the 13th and 14th columns of the section containing the 25-bay colonnade between the Towers of Peace and Victory. Located on a beige travertine-covered pedestal at the level of the Ceremonial Plaza, the sarcophagus is clad in pink syenite extracted from quarries in Topçam. A symbolic wreath made of the same material is placed in front of the sarcophagus. On the left side of the sarcophagus is an excerpt from the telegram that İnönü sent to Ankara following the Second Battle of İnönü, which was won under his command:

From Metristepe, 1 April 1921
Situation I observed from Metristepe at 6:30: Bozüyük is burning; the enemy has abandoned the battlefield, which it filled with thousands of its dead, to our weapons.
Commander of the Western Front İsmet

On the right side of the sarcophagus is an excerpt from the telegram sent by Atatürk in response to this telegram:

İnönü, 1 April 1921
To İsmet Pasha, Commander of the Western Front and Chief of the General Staff
You have defeated not only the enemy there, but also the nation's ill-fated destiny
President of the Grand National Assembly Mustafa Kemal

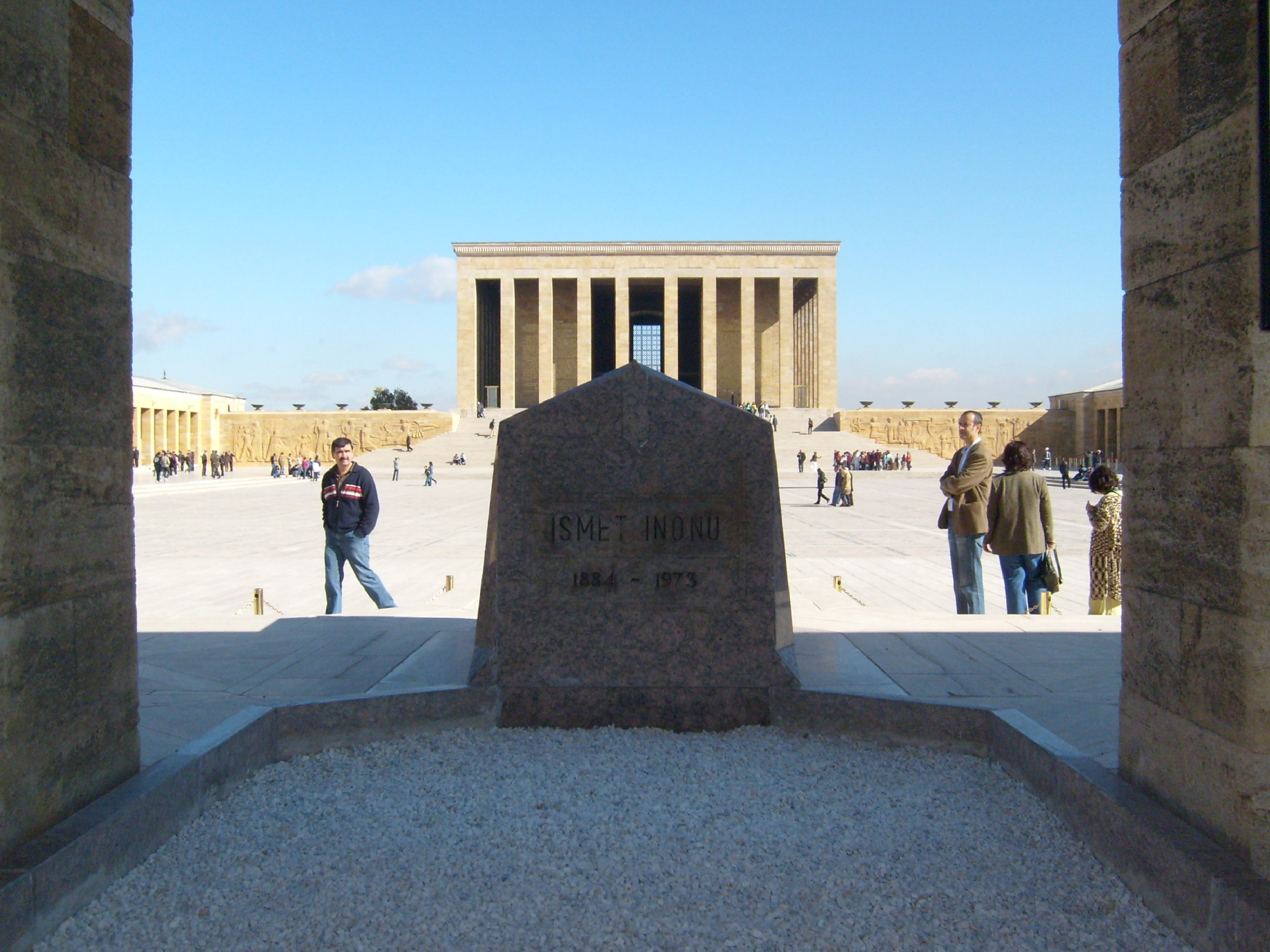
The sarcophagus of İsmet İnönü and the mausoleum section opposite it

The burial chamber and exhibition hall beneath the sarcophagus are accessed through a door opened in the outer wall of the western colonnade. To the left of the short corridor are stairs leading to the first floor, as well as a rectangular reception hall whose walls and ceiling are made of fiber-reinforced concrete. The ceiling features a solid oak lattice sloping toward the walls. The section has a granite floor and contains leather armchairs with oak frames and a solid-oak lectern holding the guestbook in which members of the İnönü family wrote during their visits. The exhibition hall is located to the left of the reception hall, while the burial chamber is on the right. The exhibition hall, which contains display cases exhibiting photographs of İnönü and some of his personal belongings, as well as a projection section showing a documentary about İnönü's life and activities, has a design similar to that of the reception hall. The square-plan burial chamber, entered first through a wooden door and then through a bronze door, is covered by a truncated-pyramid-shaped ceiling. On the western wall of the chamber is a stained-glass window with geometric patterns made of red, blue, white, and yellow glass, and a mihrab facing the qibla. The muqarnas of the mihrab and the ceiling are covered with gold-colored mosaic. On the white granite floor is a sarcophagus, also clad in white granite and facing the qibla, containing İnönü's remains. On the southern wall of the chamber and on both sides of the entrance, İnönü's following words are written in gold lettering inside rectangular niches:

It is impossible for us to abandon the fundamental principle of the Republic, which treats all citizens equally and grants the same rights to all citizens.
İsmet İnönü

Dear Turkish Youth!
In all our endeavors, the advanced human being, the advanced nation, and the elevated human society should stand before your eyes as your goal. As a powerful and patriotic generation, you will carry the Turkish Nation upon your shoulders.
19.05.1944 İsmet İnönü

=== Atatürk and the War of Independence Museum ===
The section beginning at the entrance to the National Pact Tower, proceeding through the porticos to the Revolution Tower, continuing beneath the Hall of Honor, then reaching the Republic Tower and from there proceeding through the porticos to the Defense of Rights Tower, serves as the Atatürk and the War of Independence Museum. In the first section between the National Pact and Revolution Towers, objects belonging to Atatürk and a wax statue of Atatürk are displayed. The second section contains three panoramic oil paintings depicting the Gallipoli campaign, the Battle of Sakarya, and the Great Offensive and Battle of the Commander-in-Chief, as well as portraits of Atatürk and some of the commanders who participated in the War of Independence and oil paintings depicting various moments of the war. The third section consists of thematic exhibition areas in 18 galleries along the corridor surrounding the second section; the galleries depict events from the Atatürk era through reliefs, models, busts, and photographs. The fourth and final section, located between the Republic Tower and the Defense of Rights Tower, contains a wax statue depicting Atatürk at his desk and Atatürk's private library, consisting of books belonging to him, as well as the stuffed body of Atatürk's dog Fox.

=== Peace Park ===
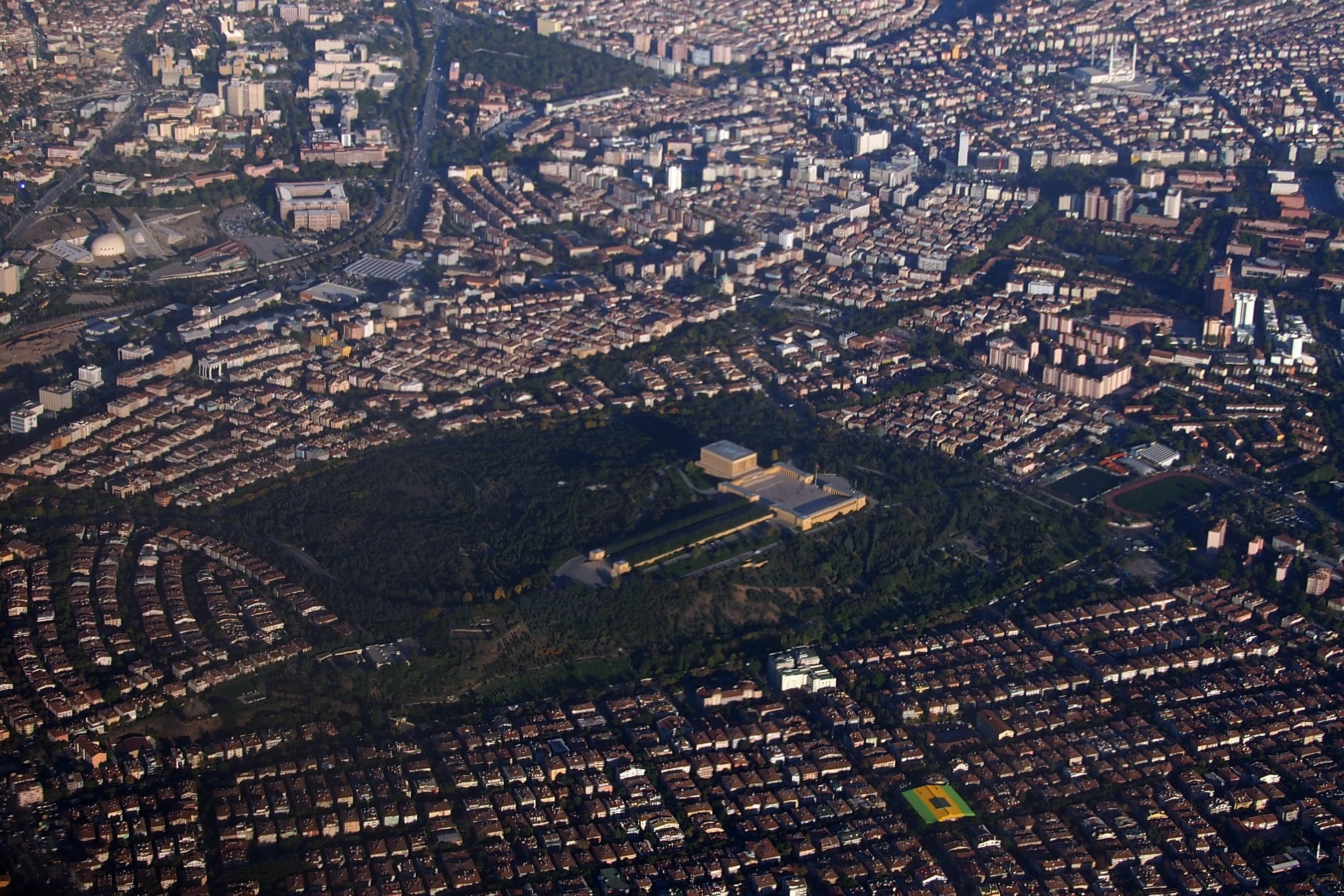
Aerial view of Anıtkabir and its surroundings

Covering an area of 630,000 m^{2} of the hill on which Anıtkabir stands, this area contains plants brought from various countries as well as from some regions of Turkey, inspired by Atatürk's maxim "Peace at home, peace in the world". The park consists of two sections, the East Park and the West Park. Seeds or saplings were sent to the park by 25 countries: Afghanistan, United States, Germany, Austria, Belgium, United Kingdom, China, Denmark, Finland, France, India, Iraq, Spain, Israel, Sweden, Italy, Japan, Canada, Cyprus, Egypt, Norway, Portugal, Taiwan, Yugoslavia, and Greece. Today, the Peace Park contains approximately 50,000 plants belonging to 104 species. The park has been closed to visitors since the late 1960s or early 1970s.

== Administration, ceremonies, visits, and other activities ==
Change of the guard of honor at Anıtkabir (August 2022)

During the competition for the project, construction, and opening of the complex, responsibility for it lay with the Ministry of Public Works. Administration of Anıtkabir and the provision of its services were transferred to the Cultural Undersecretariat of the Ministry of National Education under Law No. 6780 on the Provision of All Services of the Monument-Tomb by the Ministry of Education, which entered into force on 14 July 1956. During this period, a guard battalion consisting of personnel from the land, naval, and air forces, as well as the Gendarmerie General Command, began to be stationed in a barracks located in the Peace Park. Through interministerial correspondence, responsibility for these functions was transferred from the Ministry of National Education to the Ministry of Culture in 1974. Under Law No. 2524 on the Administration of Anıtkabir Services, which entered into force on 15 September 1981 and replaced Law No. 6780, responsibility for all affairs at Anıtkabir was transferred to the Turkish General Staff.

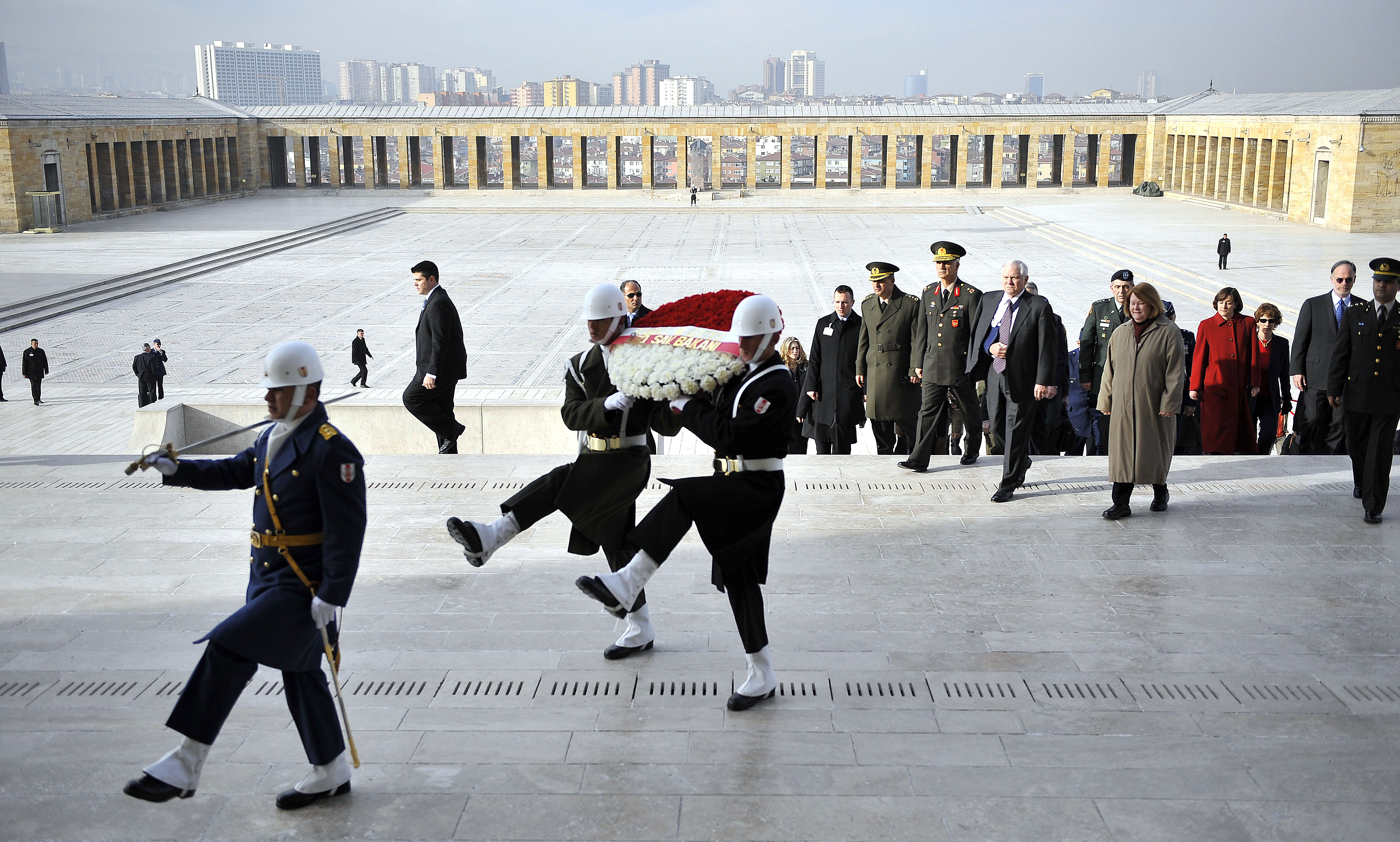
A view from a ceremony attended by United States Secretary of Defense Robert Gates (28 February 2008)

A view of commemorative events held at Anıtkabir on 10 November, the anniversary of Atatürk's death (2012)

The principles governing visits and ceremonies at Anıtkabir are regulated by a regulation that was prepared pursuant to Article 2 of Law No. 2524 on the Administration of Anıtkabir Services and entered into force on 9 April 1982. According to the regulation, ceremonies at Anıtkabir are divided into three categories: No. 1 ceremonies, attended by the head of state or their representative, or held on national holidays and on the anniversary of Atatürk's death on 10 November; No. 2 ceremonies, attended by persons included in the state protocol; and No. 3 ceremonies, attended by all natural persons and representatives of legal entities other than those participating in the first two types of ceremonies. No. 1 ceremonies, for which the commander of the guard company serves as ceremony officer, begin at the entrance to the Lions' Road, and officers carry the wreath to be laid at the sarcophagus. Except for ceremonies attended by foreign heads of state, a recording of the İstiklâl Marşı is played, while on 10 November, 10 officers stand guard throughout the ceremony. No. 2 ceremonies, for which the company commander or an officer serves as ceremony officer and during which the İstiklâl Marşı is not played, also begin at the entrance to the Lions' Road. At these ceremonies, non-commissioned officers and enlisted personnel carry the wreath to be laid at the sarcophagus. No. 3 ceremonies, for which a platoon commander or a non-commissioned officer serves as ceremony officer and during which the İstiklâl Marşı is not played, begin at the Ceremonial Plaza, and the wreath is carried by enlisted personnel. For all three types of ceremonies, separate visitor books are maintained containing texts submitted in writing to the Anıtkabir Command before the visit, and visitors sign these written texts.

According to the regulation, the organization of ceremonies is the responsibility of the Anıtkabir Command. In addition to ceremonies, Anıtkabir has also hosted various demonstrations, rallies, and protests supporting or opposing different political movements throughout history. Since the regulation entered into force, however, all ceremonies, demonstrations, and marches held for purposes other than paying respect to Atatürk have been prohibited. The regulation also prohibits the playing of any anthem or music other than the İstiklâl Marşı. Sound-and-light shows at Anıtkabir may be held at times determined by the Anıtkabir Command, in accordance with protocols established with the Ministry of Culture and Tourism. The laying of wreaths and ceremonies are subject to authorization from the Presidency's Directorate General of Protocol, the Ministry of Foreign Affairs' General Directorate of Protocol, the General Staff, and the Ankara Garrison Command. The Ankara Garrison Command is responsible for the security of ceremonies, with security measures carried out by the Ankara Garrison Command, Ankara Police Department, and the National Intelligence Organization.

The Anıtkabir Association, established in 1968 in a building at Anıtkabir to provide for the needs of the Anıtkabir Command that could not be met through the state budget, currently continues its activities in its building in Mebusevleri.

Anıtkabir was visited by 6,550,480 people in 2024. This number increased to 8,242,170 in 2025.

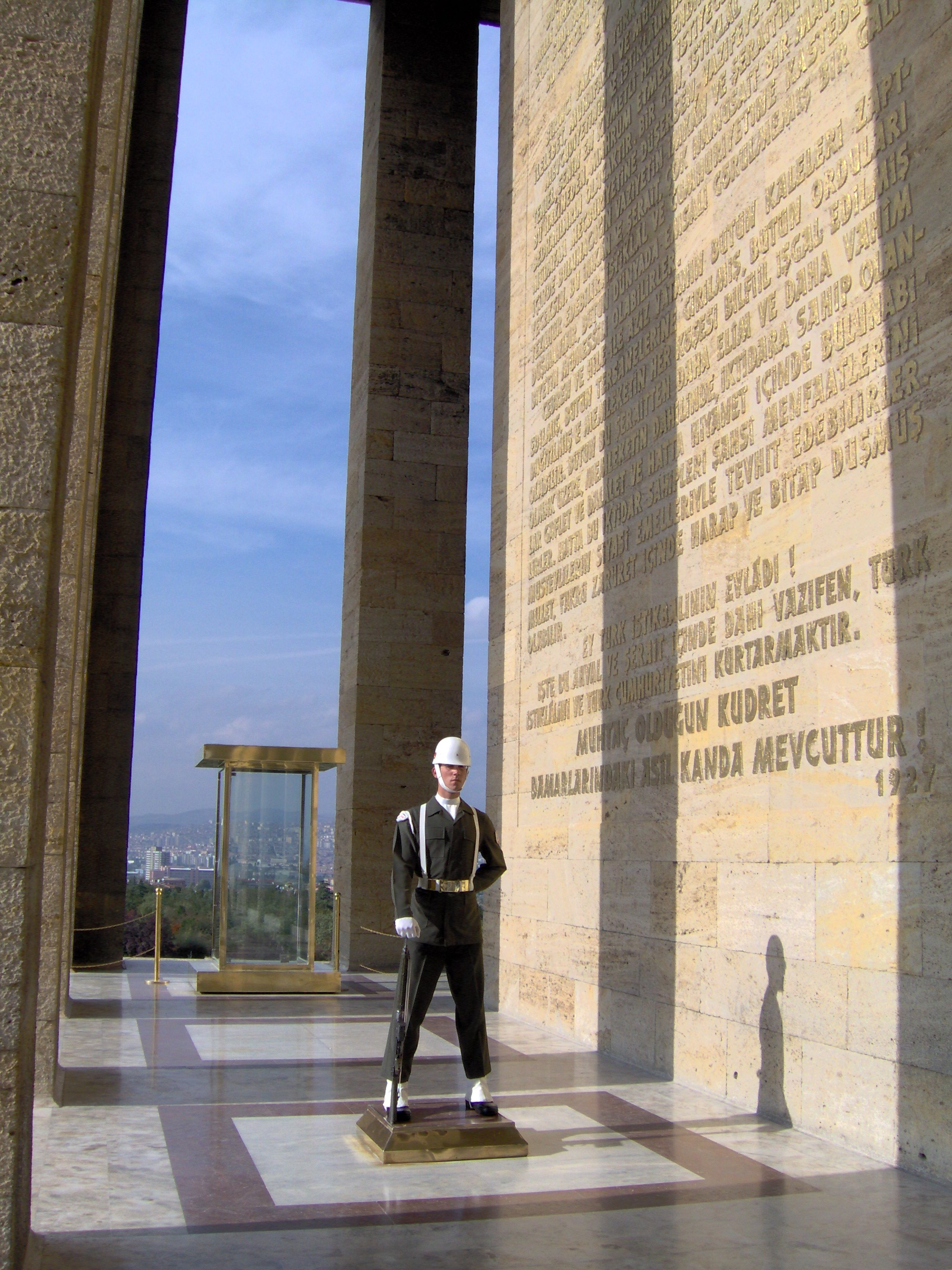
A soldier standing guard of honor at Anıtkabir

Ecuadorian President Rafael Correa's entry in the visitor's book during his visit to Anıtkabir (15 March 2012)

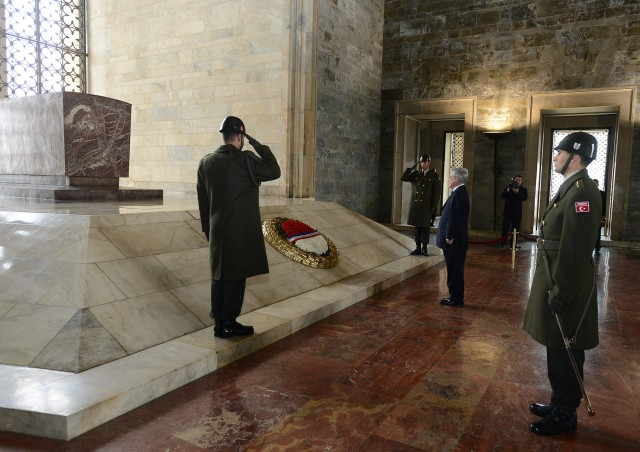
Chilean President Sebastián Piñera in front of Atatürk's sarcophagus after the laying of a wreath (19 November 2012)

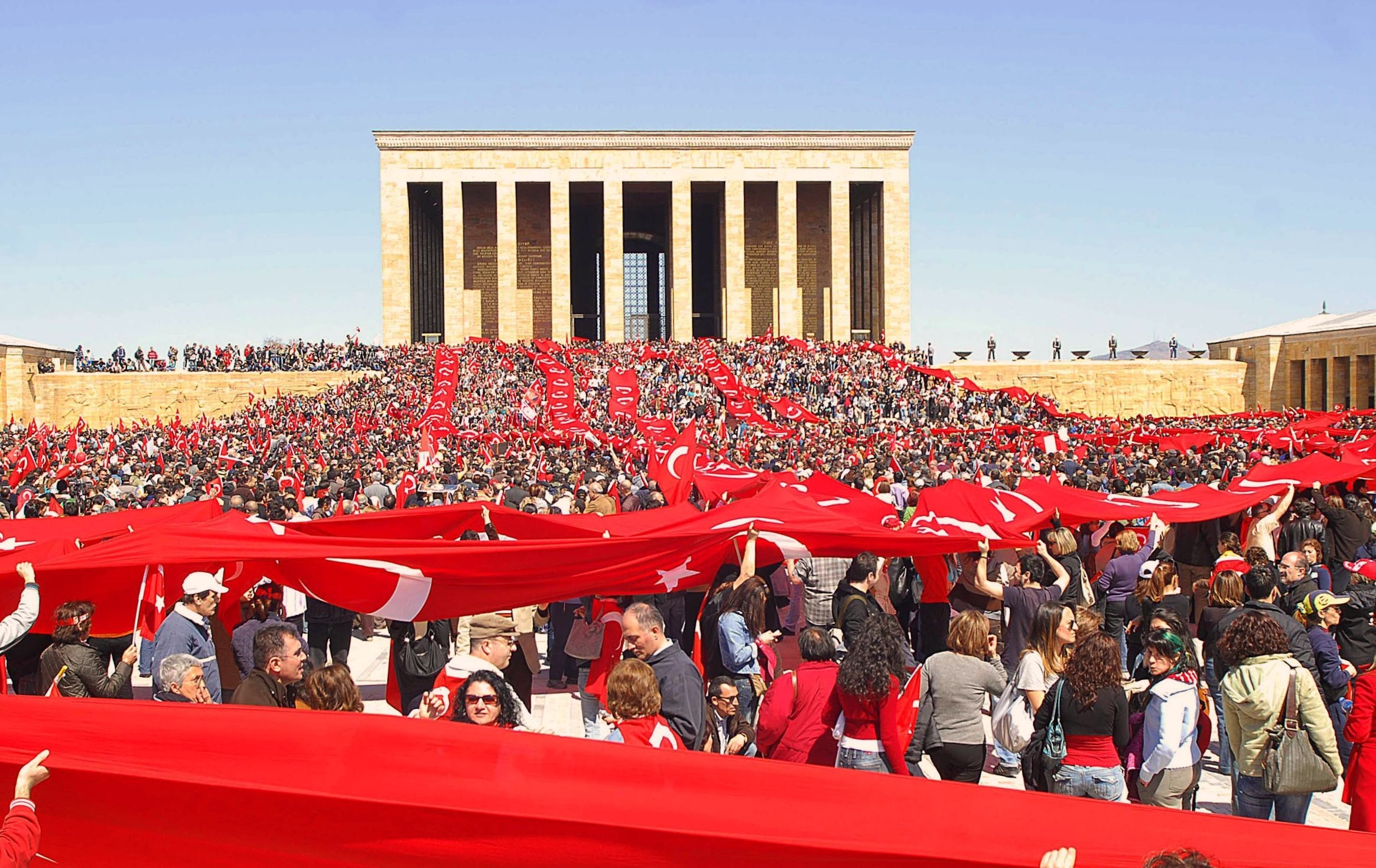
A view of a rally held at Anıtkabir as part of the Republic Protests (14 April 2007)

== Security ==
On 29 August 1986, a fire in the Peace Park burned approximately 6 decares of wooded area. Officials from the Ankara Police Department stated that before the fire they had received telephone threats from people who said they opposed the possible burial of Celâl Bayar at Anıtkabir and threatened to start fires at Anıtkabir and elsewhere. The following day, several more fires occurred in the Peace Park and various parts of Ankara. Police officials who extinguished the fires stated that they had been caused by embers from the previous day's fire that had not been completely extinguished and had reignited in the heat, while the General Staff launched an investigation into the possibility of sabotage. In a statement issued by the General Staff Military Prosecutor's Office on 12 September 1986, it was stated that neither fire had been deliberate. The first fire was attributed either to fragments of glass among dry grass reflecting sunlight and igniting the grass or to a discarded cigarette butt; the second fire was attributed to tree roots that had not been completely extinguished in the first fire.

On 19 August 1987, a fire broke out following an explosion in the building where military personnel stationed at Anıtkabir were housed; it was extinguished that same night. The General Secretariat of the General Staff reported that the fire had been caused by an electrical short circuit. Another fire broke out in the Peace Park on 18 August 2003; it was reported that "dry grass caught fire and several trees were damaged," and the fire was extinguished the same day.

During operations carried out by Turkish security forces on 28 October 1998, several members of the Caliphate State were arrested on the grounds that they were attempting to carry out attacks at Anıtkabir during that year's Republic Day celebrations on 29 October. On 12 September 2001, two days after the September 11 attacks, security measures at Anıtkabir were increased after a message sent by the Turkish Consulate General in Cologne to the Ministry of Foreign Affairs stated that an "as-yet unidentified terrorist organization" was preparing to carry out an attack on Anıtkabir similar to the September 11 attacks.

== Symbolic significance ==
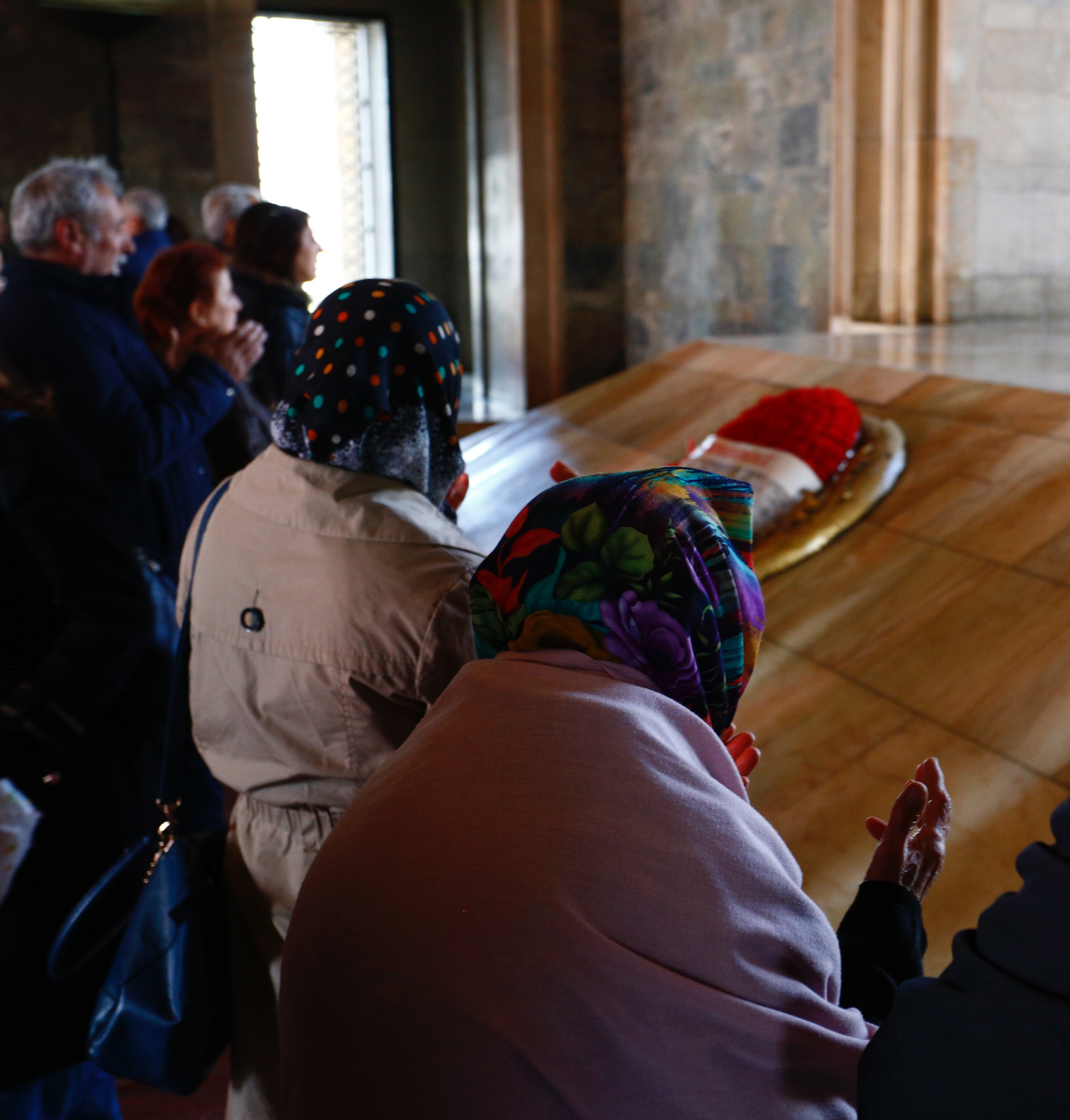
People praying beside Atatürk's sarcophagus

With its opening, Anıtkabir became not only one of the principal centers for commemorative ceremonies concerning Atatürk, but also one of the main sites for commemorations and memorial ceremonies concerning Turks more broadly, as well as "one of the symbols of the modern Republic of Turkey". At times, protesters have demanded that their demonstrations conclude at Anıtkabir; Wilson attributes the rationale for this to the protesters' desire for "grievances to be conveyed directly to Atatürk himself." Some entries in Anıtkabir's visitor book address Atatürk directly, expressing complaints or requests. Wilson notes that letters containing complaints and requests are sometimes written and sent to Anıtkabir as though Atatürk were still alive, stating that this "reinforces the idea, in the eyes of the Turkish nation, of Atatürk's immortality ... and of Anıtkabir as the place where he resides, where he genuinely lives, and where he can receive letters through the official state institution PTT".

Comparing visits to Anıtkabir with visits to the Kaaba in Mecca, Carol Delaney describes Anıtkabir as a "secular pilgrimage site". American anthropologist Michael E. Meeker compares the wreath-laying ritual, according to the hierarchical order of visits to Anıtkabir, with the Galebe Divanı ceremonies held at Topkapı Palace during the Ottoman period, stating that "citizen and founder interact within a system of constraints imposed by nationhood". Drawing on Bruce Trigger's statement that "the monumental character of long walks symbolizes the majesty of the state," Wilson draws attention to the physical demands of these rituals: the distance walked to reach Atatürk's sarcophagus, the bowing required to lay the wreath, and the requirement not to turn one's back on the sarcophagus as a sign of respect.

== Cultural impact ==
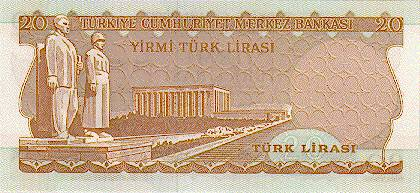
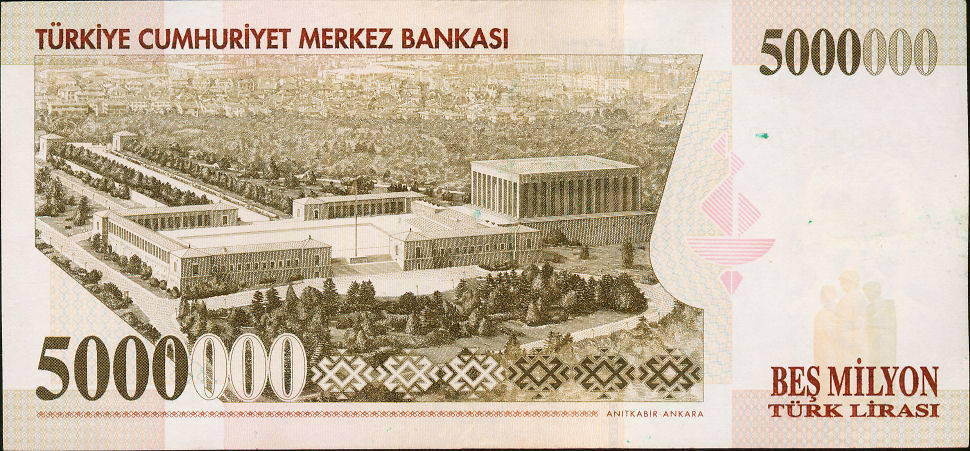
The reverse of the 20 Turkish lira banknote, in circulation from June 1966 to August 1987 (top), and the 5,000,000 Turkish lira banknote, in circulation from January 1997 to January 2006

The reverse side of the 20 Turkish lira banknote in circulation from June 1966 to August 1987, the 5,000,000 Turkish lira banknote in circulation from January 1997 to January 2006, and the 5 New Turkish lira banknote in circulation from January 2005 to January 2010 all featured depictions of Anıtkabir on their reverse sides. Anıtkabir was depicted on postage stamps issued in Turkey on 10 November 1953 to commemorate the opening of Anıtkabir; on a stamp in the "Buildings in Ankara Stamp Series" issued in Turkey in 1963; and on stamps issued in Iran and Pakistan in the same year to mark the 25th anniversary of Atatürk's death. Depictions of Anıtkabir also appeared on the reverse sides of silver commemorative coins issued by the country's national mint in 2008 and in 2013 to commemorate the 60th anniversary of the transfer of Atatürk's remains to Anıtkabir.

In Metal Fırtına, a 2004 novel by Orkun Uçar and Burak Turna, Atatürk's remains cannot be found in the ruins of Anıtkabir after the mausoleum is destroyed by bombing carried out by aircraft belonging to the United States Armed Forces. The story of Atatürk's remains is told in Uçar's 2005 sequel, Metal Storm 2: The Lost Remains. İsmail Ünver's 2005 fantasy science fiction novel Anıtkabir Soygunu ("The Anıtkabir Heist"), and Nurettin İğci's children's book Bıcırık Anıtkabir'de ("Bıcırık at Anıtkabir"), published in 2008 as part of the Bıcırık series, are also set in or concern Anıtkabir.

At Miniatürk in Beyoğlu, Istanbul, a model of Anıtkabir has been among the models displayed there since its opening in May 2003. As of April 2015, this model continued to be displayed after renovation. The Dokuma Park Open-Air Museum, opened in Konyaaltı, Antalya in May 2004 and relocated to Kepez in 2018, also contains a model of the complex among its exhibits. Anıtkabir was also among the models displayed at the Worldminia exhibition, which was held several times, beginning at ANKAmall in January–February 2014. In Extramücadele's sculpture Mustafa Kemal Türbesi ("Mustafa Kemal Mausoleum"), the mausoleum section of Anıtkabir is depicted with a minaret added to each corner of the roof.

The exhibition Anıtkabir in İzmir, opened on 10 November 2006 at Konak Square in İzmir, featured images of elements of Anıtkabir arranged according to the complex's site plan, with the aim of creating the impression of having visited Anıtkabir. The exhibition continued until 2010.

Anıtkabir ranked seventh in the list of the 20 Leading Works of Contemporary Architecture in Turkey (1923–2003), created from the results of a survey announced in the May–June 2003 issue of the journal Mimarlık.

== See also ==
- Law on Crimes Committed Against Atatürk
- Mustafa Kemal Atatürk's cult of personality
- Turkish War of Independence
- Atatürk monuments and memorials
