= 100th Anniversary of the Republic of Turkey =

2023 events celebrated in Turkey

- The 100th Anniversary Corporate Logo published by the Presidency of the Republic of Turkey
- Date: 29 October 2023
- Type: Celebration
- Cause: Centennial of the Republic of Turkey
- Website: www.yuzuncuyil.gov.tr

The 100th Anniversary of the Republic of Turkey refers to the events organized in 2023 to commemorate the centennial of the proclamation of the Republic of Turkey.

Official celebrations were coordinated by the Directorate of Communications.

== Official celebrations ==
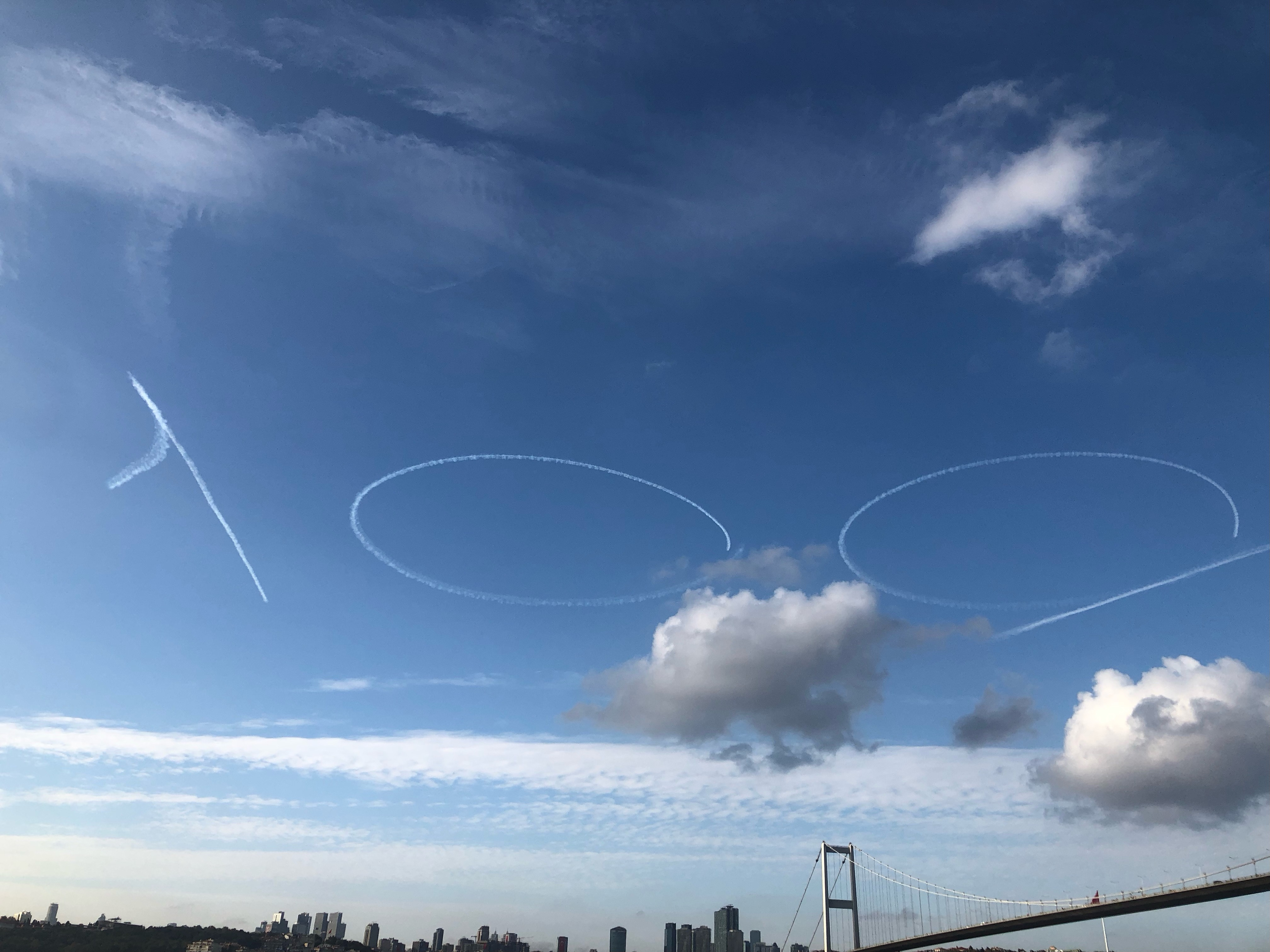
Turkish pilots skywriting "100"

The coordination and execution of the official centennial celebrations in Turkey were entrusted to the Directorate of Communications by a decision published in the Official Gazette on 24 October 2020. The celebrations, attended by public institutions and organizations, were carried out under the themes "Century of Turkey" and "Century of Stability". Fahrettin Altun, the head of the Directorate of Communications, stated that over 24,000 projects related to the centennial were implemented with the contributions of 56 institutions.

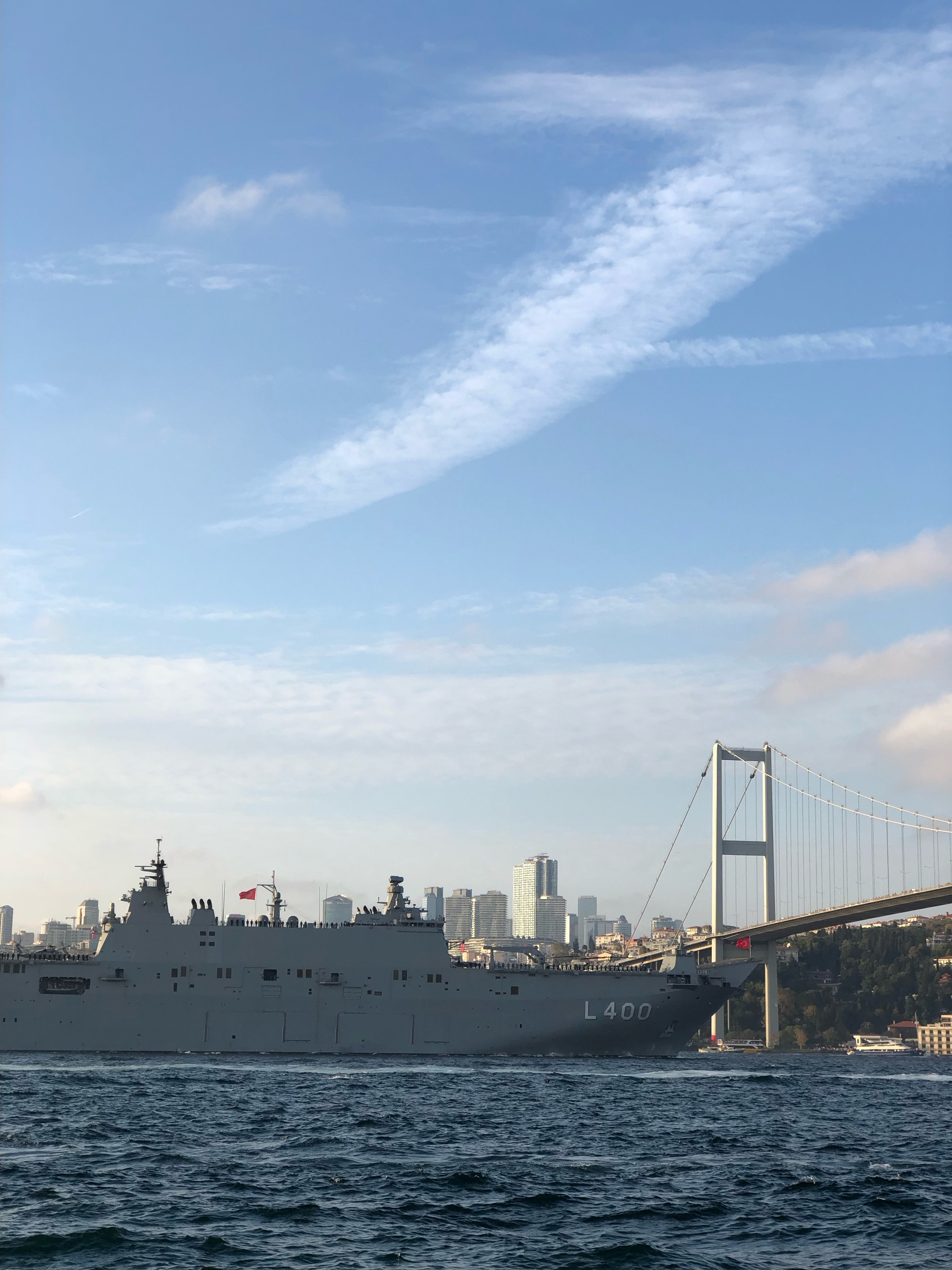
TCG Anadolu passing through the Bosporus

Key activities carried out as part of the official celebrations included:

- Establishment of a corporate identity for the 100th-anniversary celebrations. The logo created for the 100th year of the National Struggle in May 2019, featuring the number 100, the infinity sign, and the crescent-star, was adapted for the centennial celebrations of the establishment of the Republic of Turkey.
- Organization of the 100th Year Anthem Composition and Poetry Competition, with 400 entries. The anthem, composed and written by Ilker Kömürcü, was selected as the winner. It was first performed on 30 August 2023, during a special concert for Victory Day, featuring the Presidential Symphony Orchestra and other orchestras affiliated with the Ministry of National Defense.
- Celebration of Republic Day and the 100th year of the republic on 29 October 2023, through various events in Turkey and abroad. President Recep Tayyip Erdoğan, during his visit to Anıtkabir, wrote the following words in the memorial book: "Throughout our 21 years in power, we have endeavored to protect your trust with utmost dedication".
- SoloTürk and the Turkish Stars performed acrobatic displays in Ankara and Istanbul during the 29 October celebrations. The main venues for the shows were Anıtkabir and the Bosporus. For the first time in the history of the Turkish navy, 100 military ships belonging to the Turkish Naval Forces, including TCG Anadolu, passed through the Bosporus. At 19:23 (UTC+3), Erdoğan released the centennial message, followed by a fireworks and drone show in the Bosporus.

== Other celebrations and activities ==
=== Sports ===
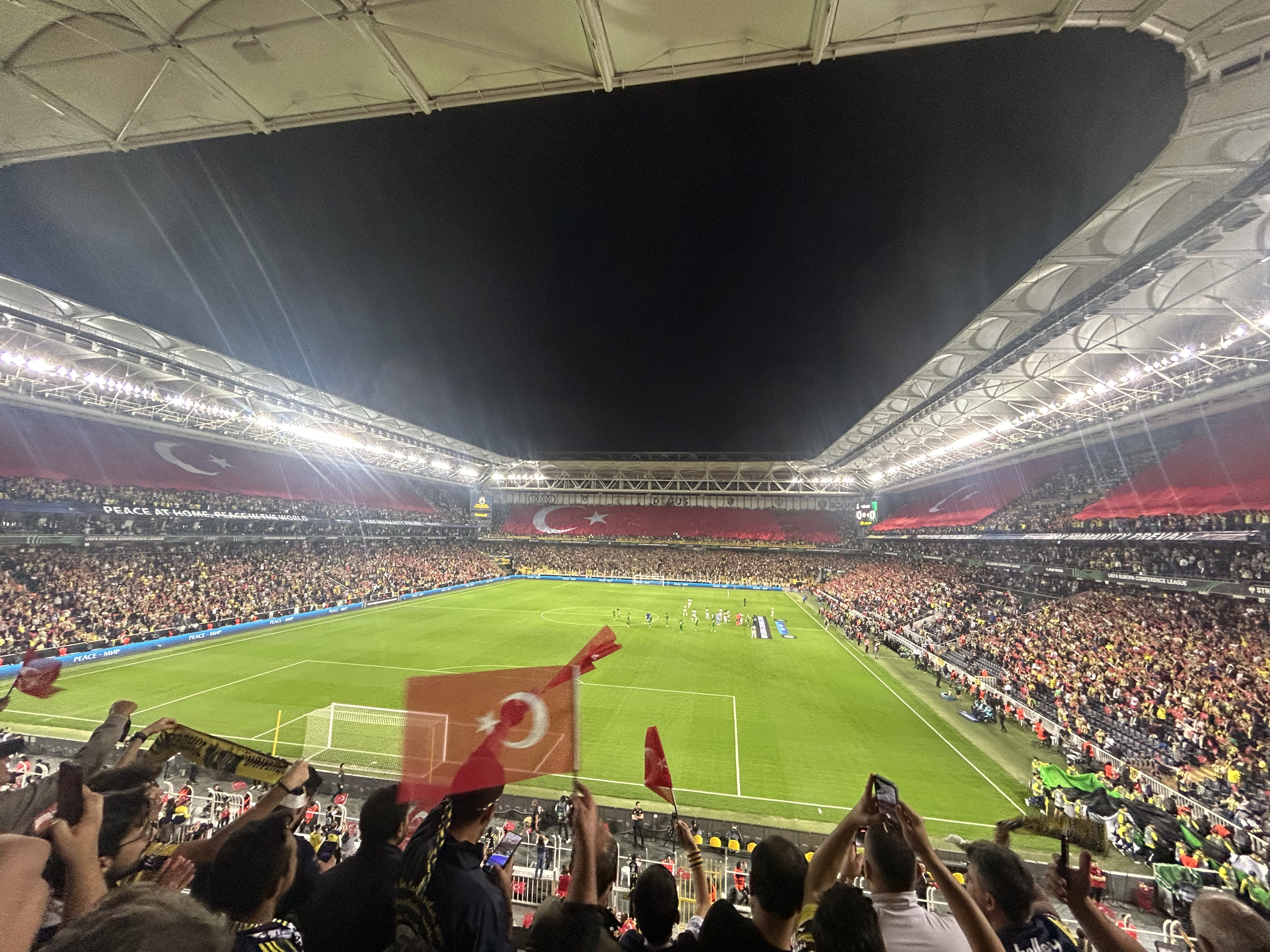
A glimpse of the celebrations at Şükrü Saracoğlu Stadium before the Fenerbahçe vs. Ludogorets match in the UEFA Europa Conference League

As part of the centennial celebrations of the republic, Süper Lig and TFF First League teams contributed to the occasion with special logo designs. Clubs unveiled jerseys created specifically for the centenary, which were made available for sale, and wore them in matches played around the Republic Day and on the day of the celebration. Clubs expressed their championship goals aligned with the theme of the 100th year, while fans composed special chants for the 2022–23 season.

Notable events included choreographed displays titled "İlelebet Cumhuriyet" (Forever the Republic) before the Galatasaray-Beşiktaş match on 22 October 2023, and "Akaretler'den Cumhuriyet'e" (From Akaretler to the Republic) during the Beşiktaş-Gaziantep match on 30 October 2023. Fenerbahçe initiated a scholarship program named "Sonsuza Dek Cumhuriyet" (Republic Forever).

Anadolu Efes, a team in the Basketbol Süper Ligi, wore a special 100th-anniversary jersey in three matches throughout the season. Underwater diver Şahika Ercümen performed a special dive at Konyaaltı Beach. The "100th Year Republic Women's Run" took place on the Yavuz Sultan Selim Bridge.

=== Press and media ===
Numerous national newspapers dedicated extensive coverage to the Republic theme and 100th-anniversary celebrations in their issues dated 29 and 30 October 2023, with some newspapers releasing special supplements. Anadolu Agency published an eight-book series titled "100 Yıl Özel Serisi" (100 Years Special Series).

Unlike the expansive book publishing activities in the 75th year, limited book production occurred in the publishing sector due to the fluctuating exchange rates. Türkiye İş Bankası Cultural Publications presented previously released books as a special series under the name "100th Year Series". Istanbul Metropolitan Municipality worked on a 15-volume project covering themes such as the Treaty of Lausanne and the Republic. The Ministry of Culture and Tourism implemented a 14-volume publication project titled "Cumhuriyetin 100. Yılına Armağan" (A Gift to the 100th Year of the Republic).

=== Education ===
Following the celebrations, on Monday, 30 October 2023, preschools, primary schools, middle schools, and high schools observed a one-day break. The Ministry of National Education announced that 100th-anniversary signs would be placed on schools opened during the centennial. The Ministry of National Education organized poetry, painting, and short film competitions in schools, along with various seminars, exhibitions, workshops, and social responsibility projects.

The Turkish Historical Society announced plans to establish library sections with 2,000 publications in all universities in Turkey, in addition to its national and international academic activities.

=== Economy ===
The General Directorate of Mint and Stamp Printing House produced and released 100 million units of a 5 TL commemorative coin specifically for the centennial. The bronze commemorative coin of the Republic of Turkey's 100th Year featured portraits of 12 former Turkish presidents on the obverse side, and on the reverse side, portraits of Aziz Sancar and Oktay Sinanoğlu, the 100th Year logo, Hürkuş, Hürjet, the Turkey women's national volleyball team, Togg, the Blue Mosque, the recognition of women's suffrage in Turkey, and symbols of the Yüksek Hızlı Tren.

=== Music ===
==== Anthems ====
In 2021, the municipality of Çekmeköy organized an anthem competition under the auspices of the Presidency of Communications. Over a two-year period, the competition concluded with the selection of the "Yüzüncü Yıl Marşı" (100th Year Anthem), with lyrics and music by İlker Kömürcü. The first performances of the winning anthems took place during the celebration program at the Presidential Complex on 30 August 2023, Victory Day. Accompanied by the Presidential Symphony Orchestra, it was officially designated as the centennial anthem of the state.

Apart from the anthems composed for the competition, many artists created anthems for the 100th year. Some of these include:

- 100. Yıl Marşı (composed by Fazıl Say, written by Ayten Mutlu)
- 100. Yıl Marşı (composed by Fahir Atakoğlu, written by Özen Yula)
- 100. Yıl Marşı (composed by Paul Dwyer, written by Ali Murat Kalburcu)
- 100. Yıl Cumhuriyet Marşı (composed and written by Kıraç)
- 100. Yıl Özgürlük Marşı (composed and written by Sedat Kunduracı)
- 100 Yılda Yüz Akıyla (composed by Erol Evgin, written by Selma Çuhacı)
- Cumhuriyet Marşı (composed and written by Soner Arıca)
- Cumhuriyet Sonsuza Dek (composed and written by Ege)
- İkinci Yüzyıl (composed and written by Kenan Doğulu)
- Parla (composed and written by Norm Ender)
- Sen Rahat Uyu (composed and written by Tarkan)
- Türkiye 100 (composed by Turan Manafzade)

==== Symphonic music ====
Composer Oğuzhan Balcı created the ten-part work "Bir Ulus Uyanıyor" (A Nation Awakens) for three soloists and a symphony orchestra, commissioned by Uludağ İçecek A.Ş. to be dedicated to the 100th year of the Republic. The first performance of the piece took place on 10 December 2023, at the Atatürk Congress and Culture Center in Bursa, performed by the Bursa State Symphony Orchestra.

=== Visual arts ===
Türkiye İş Bankası opened the Türkiye İş Bankası Painting and Sculpture Museum on İstiklal Avenue as a centennial gift. Special stamps prepared by PTT went into circulation on 29 October 2023.

=== Performing arts ===
In 2021, the Turkish State Theatres organized a playwriting competition titled "Cumhuriyetin 100. Yılında Kadın" (Women in the 100th Year of the Republic). Abdullah Öztürk won first place with the one-act play "Holden'in Külkedileri" (Holden's Cinderellas), which was performed by the Ankara State Theatre in the 2022–2023 season.

To celebrate the republic's 100th year, Çolpan İlhan & Sadri Alışık Theatre, Piu Entertainment, and Zorlu PSM jointly produced the musical "1923 Müzikali" (1923 Musical) which premiered on 23 April 2023, featuring a cast of 100.

Istanbul City Theatres presented a special musical play titled "Bu Memleket Bizim" and opened the 2023-2024 theatre season with this production. The work included excerpts from Atatürk's "Nutuk", Nazım Hikmet's "Kuvayi Milliye Destanı", and writings by various authors such as Yakup Kadri Karaosmanoğlu, Erol Toy, Samim Kocagöz and İsmet Küntay.

The Istanbul Metropolitan Municipality's Culture and Art Directorate staged the show "100", directed and scripted by Özen Yula, with music by Fahir Atakoğlu, combining music, dance, technological stage designs, and creative costumes. The performance told a story spanning from the Battle of Malazgirt to the conquest of Istanbul and Mustafa Kemal Pasha observing the occupied ships in the Bosporus in 1918. The 100th year anthem, written by Özen Yula and composed by Fahir Atakoğlu, was performed for the first time during the premiere on 9 September 2023.

The Ministry of National Education, with the support of Vakıfbank, staged the play "Cumhuriyete Doğru" (Towards the Republic) directed by Bora Severcan, depicting the beginning of the National Struggle and the story of the founding of the Republic. The play, with lyrics by İbrahim Sarıtaş and music by Selim Atakan, was performed after the first showing on 25 November 2023, at the Ankara MEB Şûra Stage, in different cities for free for teachers and citizens.

A play called "Veda" (Farewell), adapted from Ayşe Kulin's novel of the same name, was staged by Tiyatrokare as a celebratory performance for the 100th year of the republic. The play depicted the collapse of the Ottoman Empire through the events at the residence of the last Finance Minister of the Ottoman Empire, Ahmet Reşat Pasha.

Aydın Metropolitan Municipality Theatres performed the one-woman play "Anadolu Kadınları" (Women of Anatolia) depicting the heroines of Kuva-yi Milliye and the play "Cumhuriyet Kadınları" (Women of the Republic), presenting excerpts from the lives of Latife, Halide, Fikriye, Afife Ladies.

=== Architecture ===
The Ankara Metropolitan Municipality's Directorate of Culture and Natural Assets organized the republic's 100th Year Monument Idea Project Competition. Project No. 7, led by architect Kutlu İnanç Bal and architect Hakan Evkaya, won the competition. Construction of the 100th Year Gratitude Monument began in Hıdırlıktepe in August 2023. Edirne Municipality also organized a competition for the Edirne 100th Year Monument, and the selected monument was launched on 29 October 2023.

PTT prepared a special day envelope titled "Mimarlık Vakfı Cumhuriyetin 100. Yılı Anısına Mimarlığın Yüzü" (The Face of Architecture in Memory of the Republic's 100th Year).

== Local celebrations ==
Throughout the country, homes, businesses, streets, and public spaces were adorned with Turkish flags in celebration of the 100th year. Municipalities and governorates actively participated in these decorations during the centennial festivities. President Erdoğan invited all citizens to celebrate the 100th anniversary of the republic by decorating their homes, shops, and cars with Turkish flags, stating, "Let the ground and the sky be covered with flags".

From various regions of the country, messages of celebration written by farmers on their fields for the 100th year gained frequent coverage in the media. The letters written during the "Letter Campaign to the 100th Year of Our Republic" organized by PTT in 2002 were also delivered to their recipients.

=== Istanbul ===
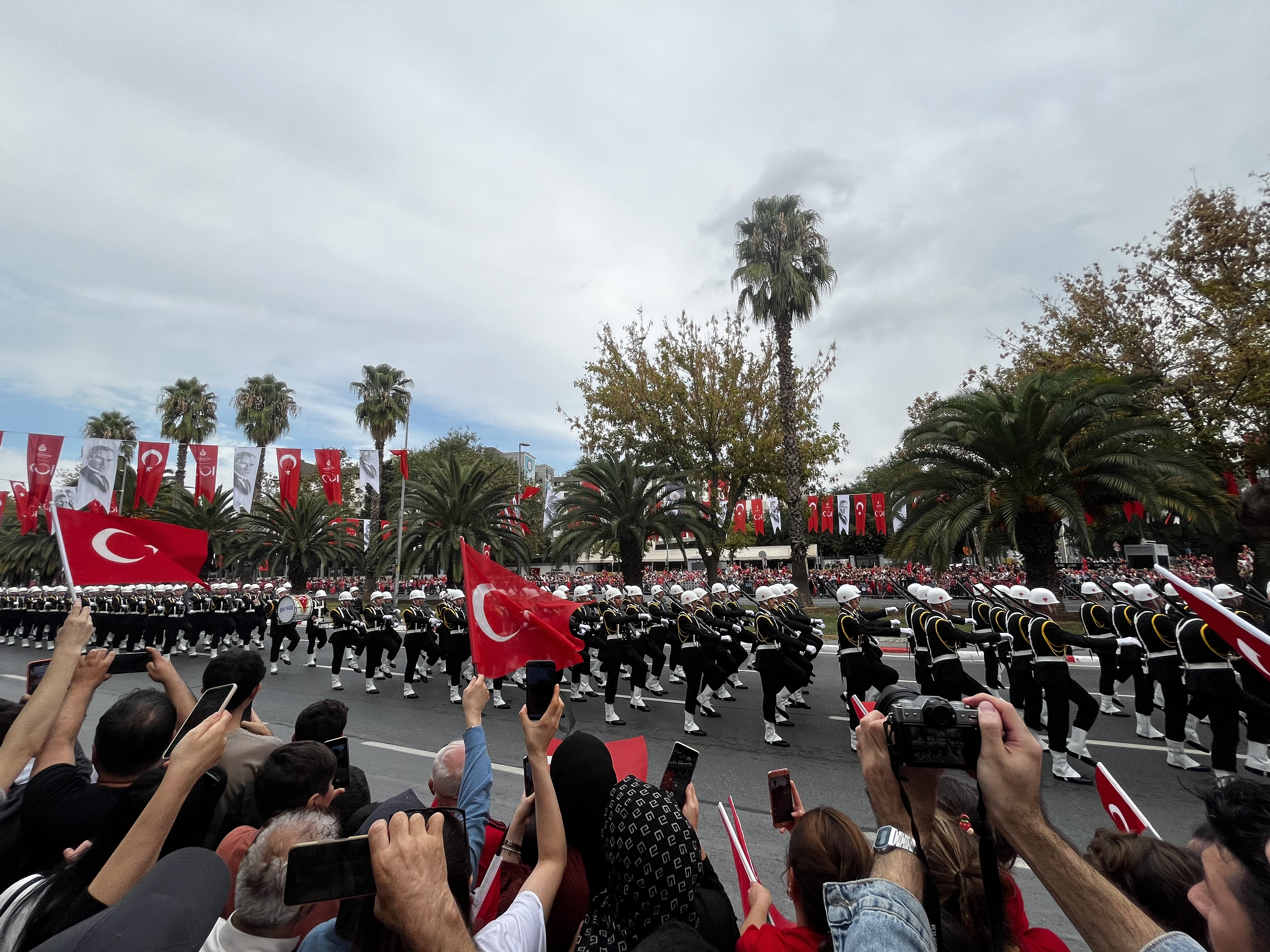
The parade held on Vatan Avenue in Istanbul

For the 100th year, the Istanbul Metropolitan Municipality chose the slogan "Century of Democracy". Atatürk posters and Turkish flags were hung in metro stations and various municipal buildings. Atatürk's statement "The republic is the greatest celebration!" during the proclamation of the republic was frequently played on the metro. On the day of the celebration, Metro Istanbul services were free, and the municipality organized a special celebration in Maltepe.

Another focal point for celebrations was traditionally Vatan Avenue. Istanbul Governor Davut Gül, Istanbul Metropolitan Municipality mayor Ekrem İmamoğlu, and First Army commander Ali Sivri participated in the official celebrations there. Following a military parade, student marches, the passage of various military and public vehicles took place. After a classic car parade, there was also a parade of Togg brand vehicles.

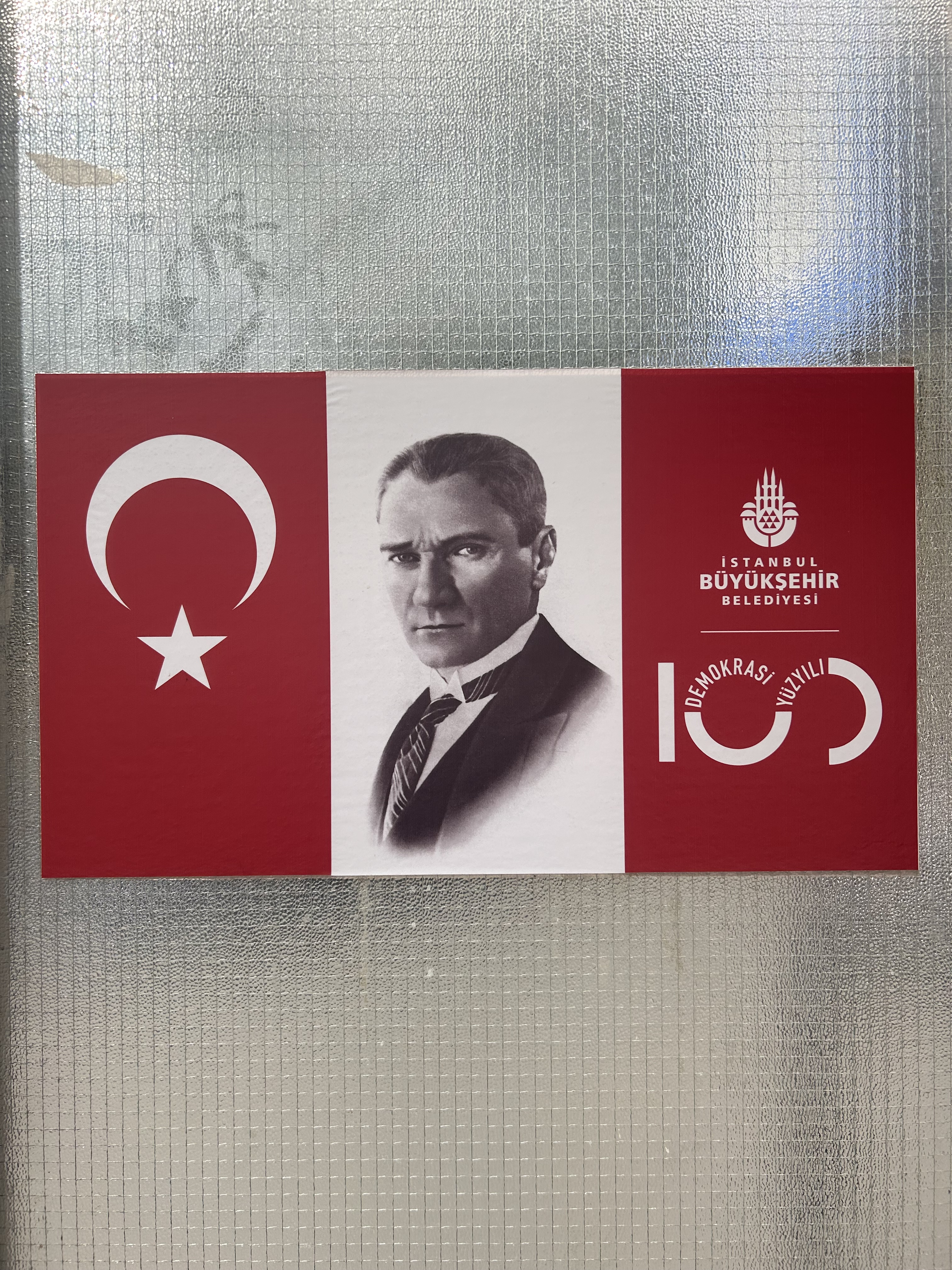
A metro wall in Istanbul with the emphasis on "Century of Democracy"

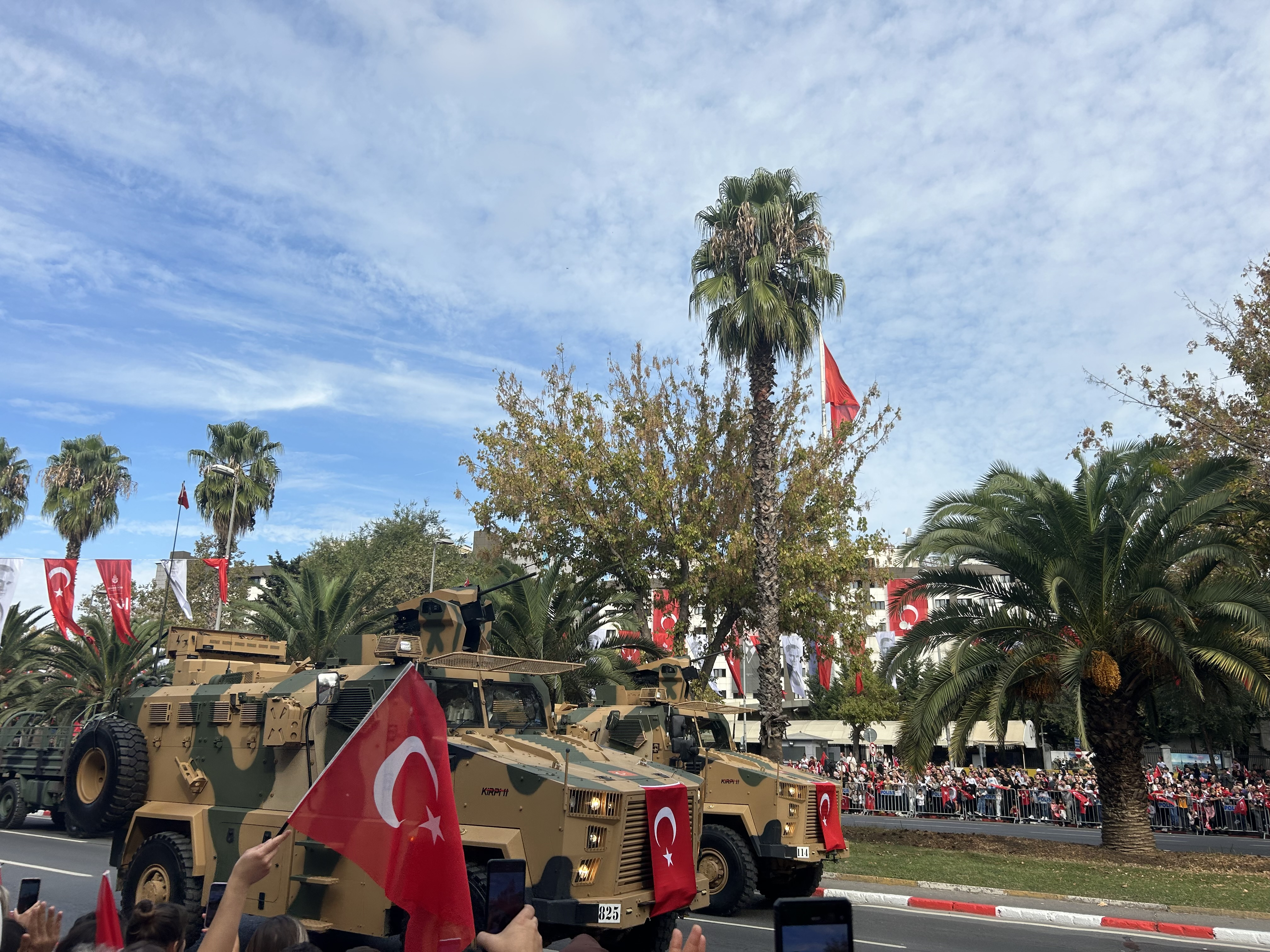
During the celebrations on Vatan Avenue, BMC Kirpi II, one of Turkey's next-generation military vehicles, in procession

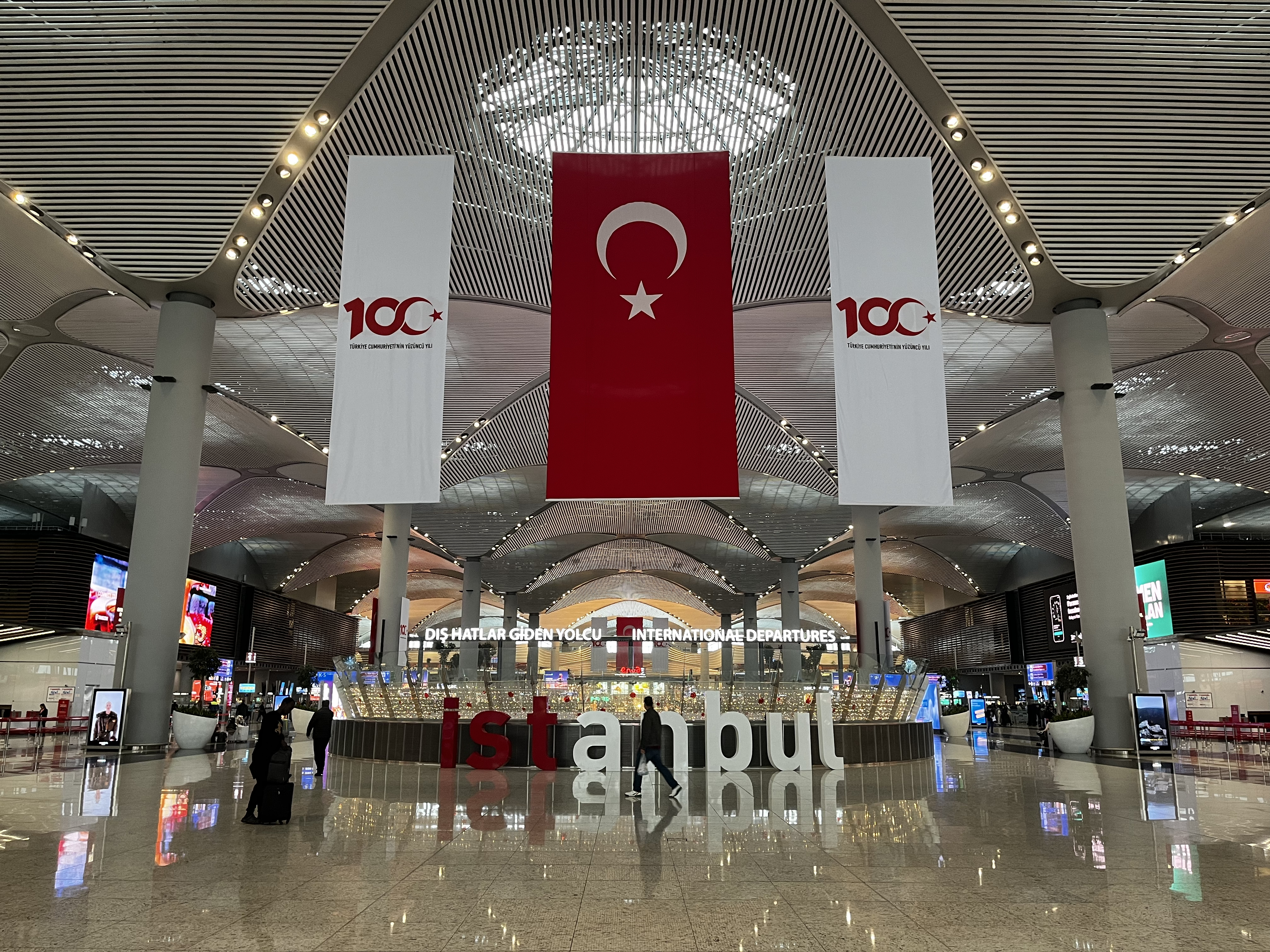
100th-anniversary banners and Turkish flags at Istanbul Airport

=== Ankara ===
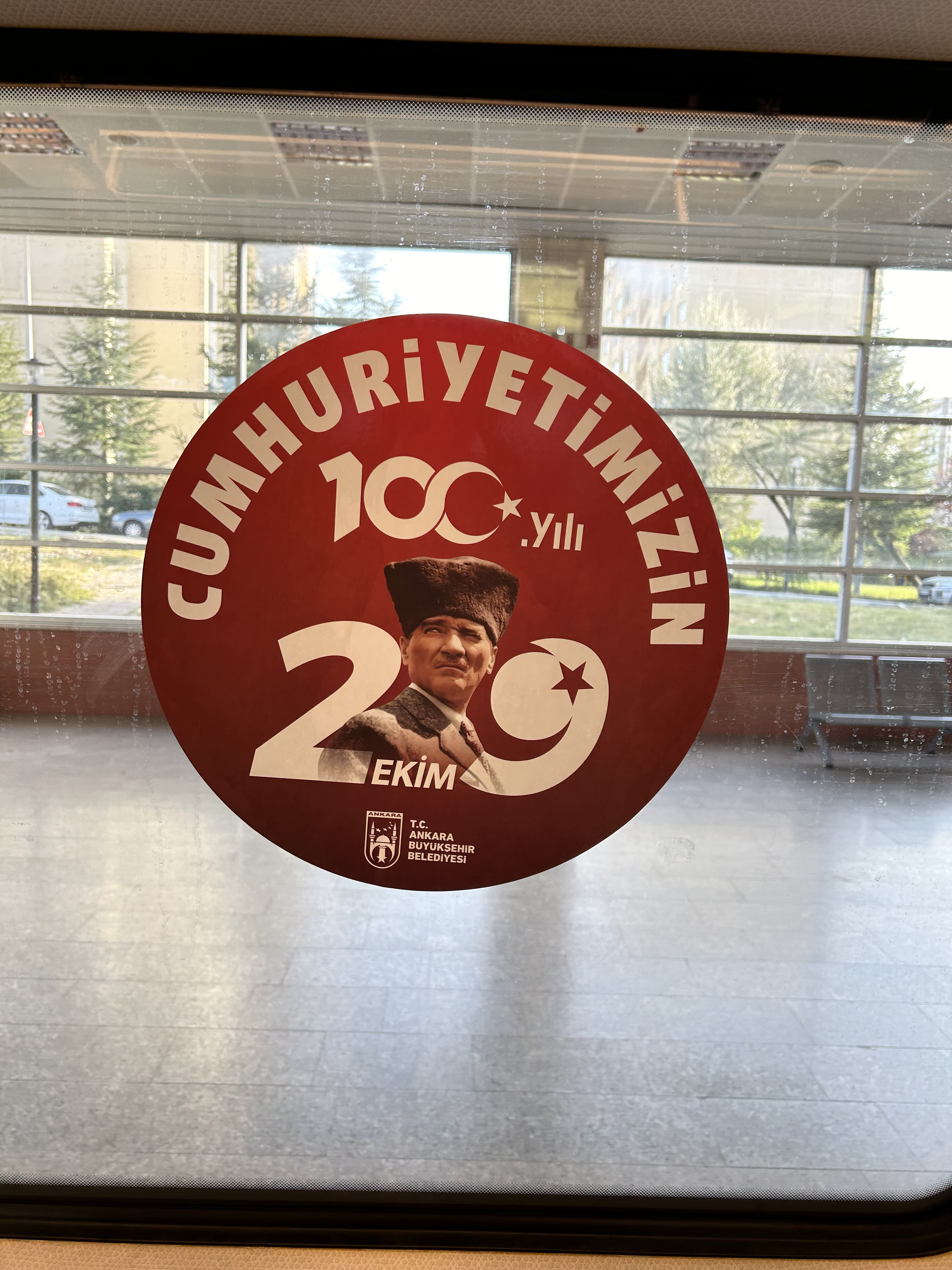
Centennial poster displayed in Ankara Metro

Between 23 October and 29 October 2023, republic week events were organized throughout the city of Ankara. As part of these activities, the city orchestra, janissary bands, and military bands performed, accompanied by concerts, theatrical plays, exhibitions, discussions, and panels.

On 29 October, an official ceremony took place at Anıtkabir. The ceremony was attended by president Recep Tayyip Erdoğan, speaker of the Grand National Assembly of Turkey Numan Kurtulmuş, vice president Cevdet Yılmaz, chief of the General Staff of the Turkish Armed Forces Metin Gürak, force commanders, political party leaders, state officials, and citizens. After the ceremony, a moment of silence was observed, and the national anthem was played at Anıtkabir. On the same day, an official civil-military parade was held in front of the Grand National Assembly building - the first held since the COVID pandemic, followed by a 100th year celebration program as the finale of the festitivies.

Concerts, theatrical plays, and various activities were organized in various squares and parks across Ankara.

=== Bursa ===
Bursa Metropolitan Municipality celebrated the 100th year with events spanning from October 12 to 30. The events began with the opening of the "Cumhuriyet’in 100. Yılında Bursa Büyükşehir Belediyesi Hafızası Sergisi" (Memory Exhibition of Bursa Metropolitan Municipality in the 100th Year of the Republic) on 12 October. The activities concluded on 30 October with the Award Ceremony of the Bursa Daily Story Contest and the final of the Bursa Inter-School Debate Contest.

Nilüfer City Theater performed a live reading titled "Yüz Yıllık Söz" (A Hundred Years of Words) at the Balat City Forest stage. As part of this performance, 100 novels written during the republic era were selected, and 100 theater students from all drama schools and conservatories in Turkey read them in one breath within a day.

=== İzmir ===
Locally, in İzmir, the İzmir Metropolitan Municipality organized exhibitions, concerts, plays, competitions, traditional dance of zeybek displays, and a torchlight procession to mark the 100th year.

== See also ==
- 10th anniversary of the Republic of Turkey
