= Bursa State Symphony Orchestra =

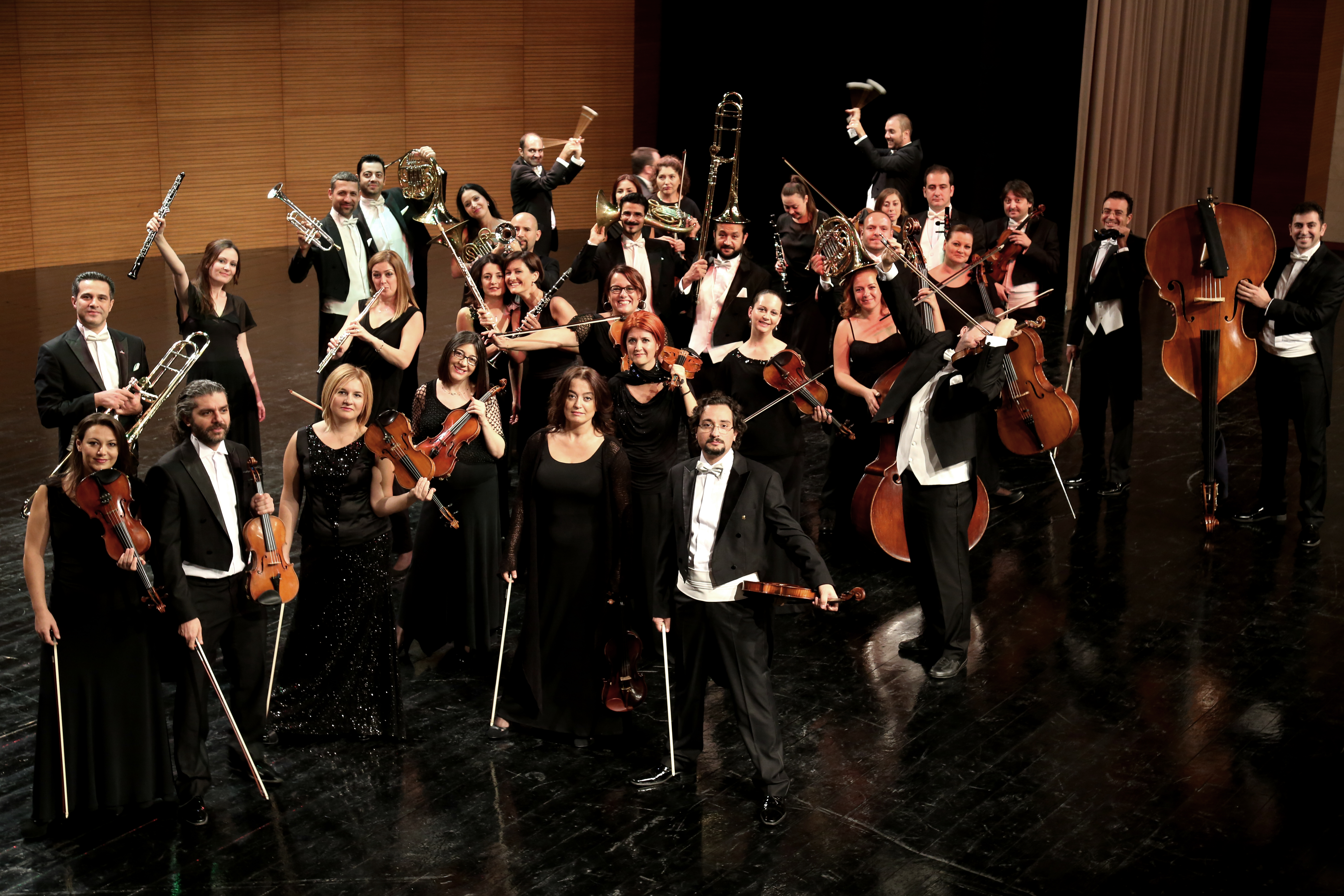

The Bursa Regional State Symphony Orchestra is an orchestra located in Bursa, Turkey, which is the only "state" orchestra in the country. The orchestra branched out from String Instruments Chamber Orchestra (1995), which was formed within the Bursa Uludağ University and the Bursa Metropolitan Municipality established Winds and Percussion Instruments Ensemble (1996). The two community joined to form the Bursa Symphonic Orchestra in 1998.

Under the leadership of Prof. Hikmet Şimşek, the orchestra was formed as the Turkey's first and only "Regional" and 6th "State Symphony". Ahmet Borova, who has been a member of the Presidential Symphony Orchestra for over 30 years, worked as the founding manager. Orhan Salliel worked as the chief conductor, and kept his position until 2009. from 2009 to 2014, the orchestra worked with Turkey's first woman conductor, Inci Ozdil. Later the orchestra worked with composer and conductor Oguzhan Balci (2014-2016), Dağhan Doğu (2017-2913) and Naci Özgüç.

The orchestra appears in Daghan Celayir's short movie "The One Note Man" in 2008.

It reached over 16,000 young viewers with free educational concerts. The orchestra also acquired the Orchestra Of The Year award with votes from more than 200 professionals and the public at the Donizetti Classical Music Awards ceremony. The event is organised by classical music magazine Andante, and it was the first time in its history for a state orchestra to receive the award.

It has hosted world-renowned artists such as: E. TABAKOV, A. RUDIN, B. FROMANGER, T STRUGALA, H. GRIFFITHS, G. AYKAL, R. GÖKMEN, S. KAN, F. SAY, İ. BİRET, A. ERDURAN, A. SARICA, A. BARAN, G. ONAY, Y. KENTER, M. KENTER, G. ERKAL and performed with artists such as: Valerie OİSTRAKH, Shlomo MINTZ, Vanessa MAE, Alexander MARKOV, Gilles APAP, Soyoung YOON, Roman KIM, Petr WAGNER, Wenzel Fuchs, Jiri BARTA, Peter Bruns, Rafael WALLFISCH, Stefan SCHILLI, Maurice STEGER, Isabella Van KEULEN, Roby LAKATOS, Klazz Brothers, George DALARAS, The SWINGLE SINGERS, and The GLASS DUO

The orchestra has traveled and held tours in cities such as Çanakkale, Balıkesir, Muğla, Nevşehir, Çorum, Konya, Istanbul, Ankara, Izmir, Antalya, Eskişehir, Kütahya, Yalova and Kocaeli.
