= Norm Ender =

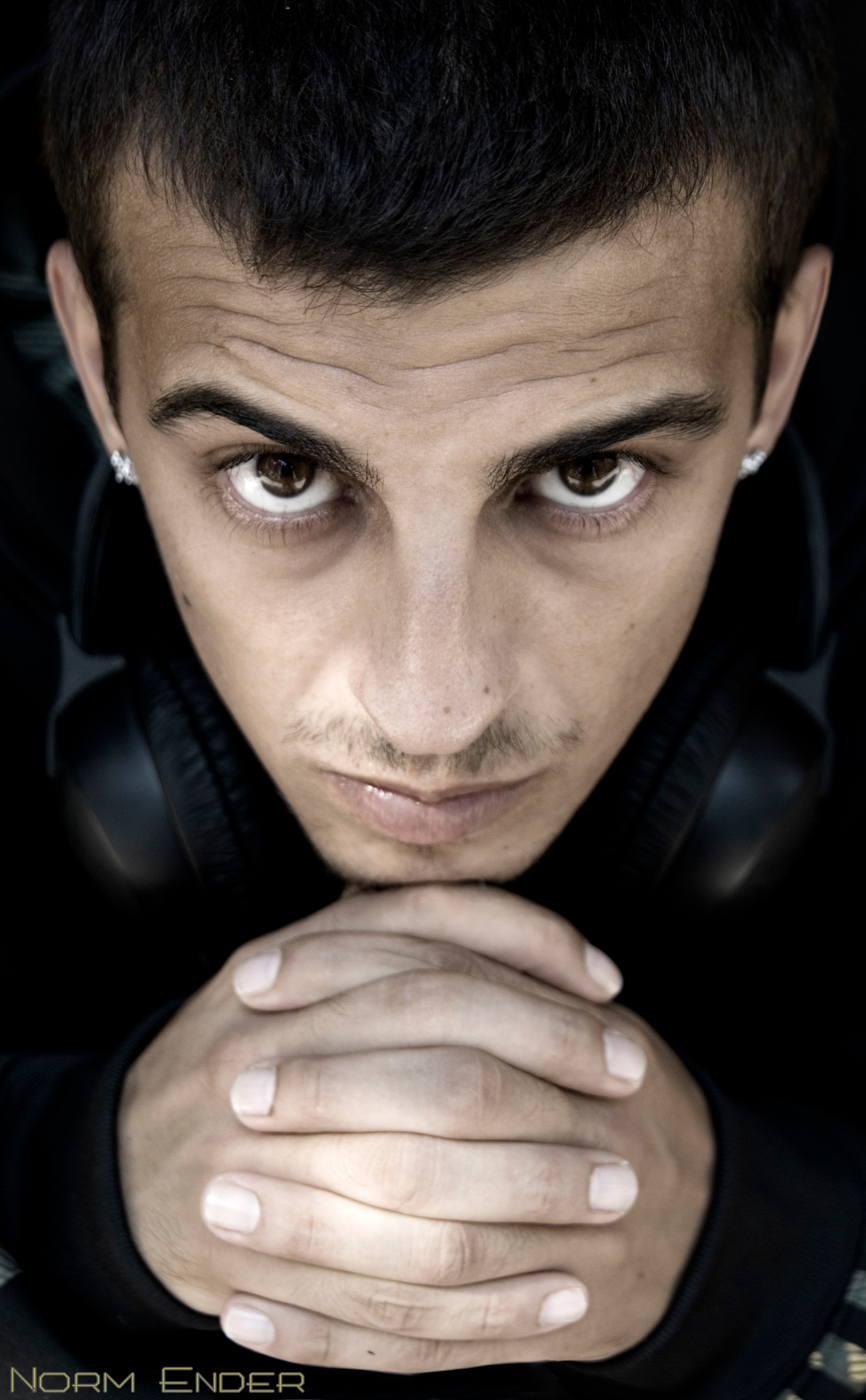
- Norm Ender in 2010

Background information
- Born: Ender Eroğlu; 25 March 1985 (age 41); Bornova, İzmir, Turkey
- Origin: Turkey
- Genre: Turkish hip hop
- Occupations: Singer; rapper
- Years active: 1999–present
- Labels: Norm Records; EMI

Ender Eroğlu (born 25 March 1985), better known by his stage name Norm Ender, is a Turkish rapper and singer.

== Career ==
At the age of ten, Ender started rapping after being influenced by the German-Turkish rap group Cartel. After dropping out of school, he started rapping in 2001 and then attended the music contest Akademi Türkiye broadcast by atv television channel.

Initially asked to sing pop music in the Akademi Turkiye contest, Ender refused to comply with the competition's request. Eventually, the Akademi introduced a rap course into its programme.

Ender began a group with Erman Altınoğlu, known as "Ender & Erman" or "Erman & Ender". After completing his military service, in 2010 Ender made a solo rap album called Içinde Patlar. In 2012, he announced that he would release a new album. He gave concerts in İzmir, Diyarbakır and Ankara to promote this album and started using the stage name Norm Ender for his solo releases.

Ender became known on social media for his song "Eksik Etek". This song received about 40 million plays on YouTube in one month, making him the 17th most listened to Turkish artist of 2006.

After a 5-year break from music, in 2016 Ender announced a new album under the EMI-Universal Music Turkey label.

Norm Ender released the album Aura, which includes 9 tracks and real instruments, in 2017. He later unilaterally terminated his agreement with the company.

In 2018, Ender prepared and published an animated clip for the old song "Depresyon Oteli".

In July 2019, Ender returned with the track "Mekanın Sahibi" (Owner of the Venue), which satirised the Turkish rap scene and specifically took aim at rappers like Ezhel and Ben Fero, calling them 'babies', and featuring a chorus that aimed to establish Ender's dominance over newer and younger rappers: "The owner of the venue is back, let's take the babies off the track". In November 2019, the song was taken down by Spotify due to alleged copyright violations. The song was again restored on Spotify in the same month. The song has passed 200 million streams

In 2020, he released the song "Konu Kilit". He released another single called "İhtiyacım Yok" without any words. He signed a contract with the Hummel brand in 2020 and extended the contract in 2021.

In 2021, he released a deephouse/rap piece called "Bulamazdım" accompanied by DJ Faruk Sabancı. On 19 November 2021, he released the track "Kediler Aslan Olmaz (Cats Can't Be A Lion)".

On his birthday, 25 March 2022, he released the song "Sus Artık (Hush Now)". On 5 August 2022, he released the song "Sadece Öpücem (Just Kiss)".

On October 26, 2023, he performed the anthem he wrote for the 100th Anniversary of the Republic of Turkey, titled "Parla (100th Year Anthem)", on Oğuzhan Uğur's Mevzular Açık Mikrofon. This work, which was released on digital platforms on October 27, 2023, is Norm Ender's first work in the anthem genre.

== Discography ==
=== Albums ===
Year	Album	Details
2010	Enderground	His first underground album, which he produced and released himself between 2002 and 2009.
2010	İçinde Patlar	A video for "İçinde Patlar" was released in 2010. It was followed by a video for "Çıktık Yine Yollara" in 2011. In 2018, he prepared and published an animation for the Depresyon Oteli piece.
2017	Aura	Released by EMI He also used real instruments in the album. It consists of 9 parts. He shot the clip for the song Deli before the album, and the clip for the song Kaktüs after the album.

=== Music videos ===
- 2002 - Kinim
- 2007 - Tekir
- 2010 - İçinde Patlar (Remix)
- 2011 - Çıktık Yine Yollara
- 2017 - Deli
- 2017 - Kaktüs
- 2018 - Depresyon Oteli (Animation)
- 2019 - Mekanın Sahibi
- 2020 - Konu Kilit
- 2020 - İhtiyacım Yok
- 2021 - Bulamazdım (ft. Faruk Sabancı)
- 2021 - Kediler Aslan Olmaz
- 2022 - Sus Artık
- 2022 - Sadece Öpücem
- 2022 - Bu Düş Çok Güzel
- 2023 - Konuşun Konuşun
- 2023 - Parla (100th Anniversary March)
- 2025 - Bir Çift Göz (ft. Ebru Gündeş)
