= State of the Turks =

State of the Turks may refer to:

- Mamluk Sultanate (1250–1517), contemporaneously referred to as the State of Turkey (Arabic: الدولة التركية ad-Dawlat at-Turkīyyah) among other names.
- The area controlled by the Ankara Government (from 1921 until the proclamation of the Republic of Turkey on 29 October 1923) was known as the State of Turkey (Turkish: Türkiye Devleti).
- Second Turkic Khaganate
