= 10th anniversary of the Republic of Turkey =

1933 celebrations in Turkey

10th anniversary of the Republic of Turkey Türkiye Cumhuriyeti'nin kuruluşunun 10. yıl dönümü
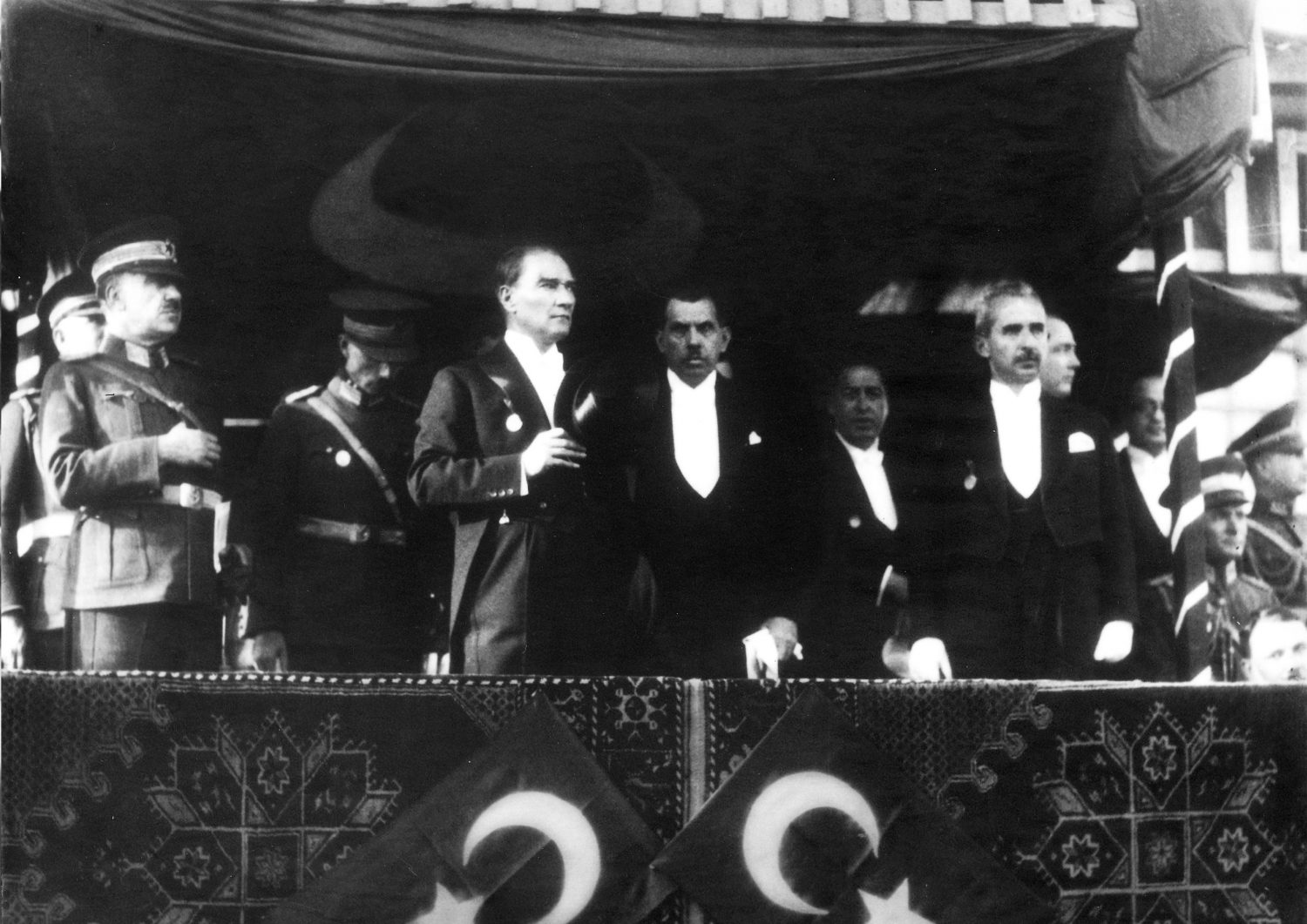
- Gazi Mustafa Kemal Paşa, Müşir Fevzi Paşa, Ferîk-i Evvel İsmet Paşa
- Genre: Military parade, Ball
- Date: 29 October 1933; 93 years ago
- Venue: Ankara Hipodromu
- Locations: Nationwide, Ankara, İzmir, Istanbul

The tenth anniversary of the establishment of the Republic of Turkey occurred on 29 October 1933 and contained a historic speech of Mustafa Kemal Pasha (Atatürk). Turkey hosted a Soviet delegation headed by Kliment Voroshilov, the People's Commissar for Military and Naval Affairs (equivalent to the Minister of Defense), and delegations of states from the Balkans attended as well. On 26 October, a comprehensive general amnesty was enacted when the Grand National Assembly adopted Law 2330. The ceremony began at 10:00 AM and concluded at 2:30 PM. To organize the anniversary commemorations, a ceremonies committee was formed. Upon a joint proposal by Giresun Deputy Hakkı Tarık Bey and four other deputies, official authorization was granted to extend the tenth anniversary celebrations over three days, featuring a public holiday marked by special events. The committee was also tasked with commissioning a commemorative military march, calling upon several poets to submit lyrics celebrating the Republic's achievements and the immense scale of the Turkish Revolution.

Coinciding with the anniversary commemoration, classes commenced at Istanbul University, which had been reorganized from the Darülfünun.

== Guests ==
- Germany: German ambassador to the Soviet Union Rudolf Nadolny
- Bulgaria: Minister of Education M. Boyadjiev and General Markov
- Greece: Commander of the Air Force General Christos Adamidis
- Romania: Members of the Senate of Romania Ahmet Takçı and Mustafa Bey
- Soviet Union: People's Commissar for Military and Naval Affairs Marshal Kliment Voroshilov
- Mufti of Silistra Hafız Rıfat Efendi

== See also ==
- 100th Anniversary of the Republic of Turkey
- Republic Day
