= Resmi Gazete =

Government gazette of Turkey

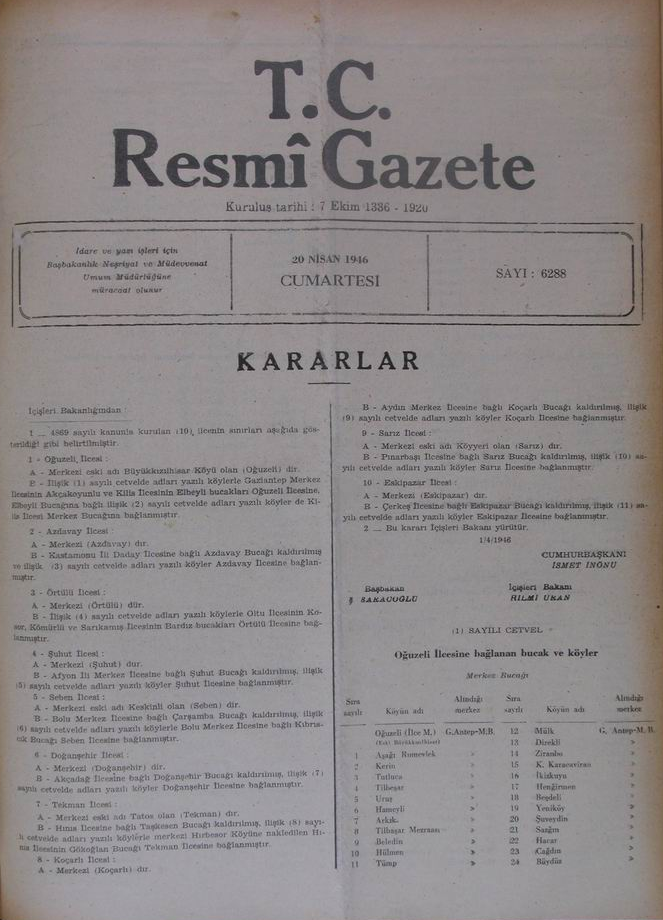
- The front page of T.C. Resmî Gazete, dated 20 April 1946
- Type: Daily official gazette (1925–2018); Electronic official gazette (2018–present)
- Publisher: Directorate of Presidential Administrative Affairs, General Directorate of Law and Legislation
- Founded: 7 October 1920; 105 years ago
- Language: Turkish
- Headquarters: Ankara, Turkey
- OCLC number: 61670287
- Website: www.resmigazete.gov.tr

The Resmi Gazete (Turkish: T.C. Resmî Gazete, lit. 'Official Gazette of the R.T. (Republic of Türkiye)') is the national and only official journal of Turkey that publishes the new legislation and other official announcements. It is referred to as Resmî Gazete (lit. 'Official Gazette') in short.

It has been published since 7 February 1921, approximately two years before the proclamation of the republic. The first fifteen issues of the newspaper were published once a week, the next three issues once every two weeks, the next three issues once a week. From 18 July 1921 to 10 September 1923, the newspaper was not published due to the Turkish War of Independence. Since Issue No. 763, which was released on 17 December 1927, it has been officially published under the name Türkiye Cumhuriyeti Resmî Gazete. As of 1 December 1928, it started to be printed with the new Turkish alphabet based on Latin letters.

Its content include legislation (laws, decisions of the Council of Ministers, regulations, communiqués etc.), certain case-law and official notices, especially public administration appointments and tender notices.

Resmi Gazete is also available from the web. Issues back to 27 June 2000 were available online until 2011. Today all issues are available and new issues have been published only online since 2018.
