= Hasan Atilla Uğur =

Turkish politician and soldier

- Born: 19 December 1957 (age 68); Ankara, Turkey
- Children: Oğuzhan Uğur; Tuğrul Uğur
- Military career
- Allegiance: Turkey
- Rank: Colonel
- Unit: Gendarmerie

Hasan Atilla Uğur (born 19 December 1957, Ankara) is a Turkish soldier and politician.

== Military career ==
He graduated from Kuleli Military High School in 1975 and began attending the Turkish Military Academy the same year. He graduated with the rank of Gendarmerie lieutenant in 1979. After graduating from Tuzla Infantry School Command and Gendarmarie School, he went through commando training. At İmralı Island, He interrogated Kurdistan Workers' Party leader Abdullah Öcalan, who had been captured in Kenya in 1999 and brought back to Turkey.

He took important roles in the operations against Hezbollah in 2000–2001. Between 2002 and 2004, he served as the Head of Gendarmerie Technical Intelligence Department. While he was the Head of the Gendarmerie General Command Technical Intelligence Department, he prepared a comprehensive report on the Gülen movement and submitted it to the higher authorities. He served as Kocaeli Provincial Gendarmerie Commander between 2004–2005 and Çanakkale Training Regiment Commander between 2005 and 2007. In 2007, he retired voluntarily from this position at the rank of Colonel.

== Ergenekon lawsuit ==
He was detained on 1 July 2008 as part of the Ergenekon investigation. He was referred to the court by prosecutor Zekeriya Öz and arrested by Judge Sedat Sami Haşıloğlu. On 5 August 2013, the court sentenced him to 20 years in prison for "attempting to overthrow the Government of the Republic of Turkey or to prevent it from performing its duties partially or completely by using force and violence" in accordance with Article 147 of the old Turkish Penal Code, taking into account the date of the crime, and to 7 years in prison for "obtaining personal data". He was also sentenced to 2 years and 3 months imprisonment and a 4,500 liras fine for "opposing the Law on Firearms." He was released on 10 March 2014 after 5 years, 8 months and 10 days of imprisonment. On 21 April 2016, the 16th Criminal Chamber of the Court of Cassation overturned the verdict of the Istanbul 13th High Criminal Court. In 2019, he was tried again at the 4th High Criminal Court and acquitted. The verdict was finalized.

== Kızıltepe trial ==
He was put on trial for a series of unsolved murders in Kızıltepe presumed to be connected to the Gendarmerie Intelligence Organization (JİTEM) during the 1990s. At the final hearing of the case, held at Ankara 5th High Criminal Court on 9 September 2019, he was acquitted due to the lack of evidence for the crimes charged against him.

== Political life ==
In the 12 June 2011 general elections, he ran as an independent candidate for the Antalya parliamentary constituency, but was not elected. While in detention, he published a book about the events that took place during Abdullah Öcalan's interrogation. In addition, his book Dün Bugün Yarın, in which he talks about his life and current issues, was published by Destek Publishing in 2019. In 2022, his book "Sorgu Odasında Apo: Yakın Tarihin Karanlıkları Aydınlanıyor" was published. Until 2018, he served as the deputy chairman of the Patriotic Party.

== Books ==
- 2011: Abdullah Öcalan'ı Nasıl Sorguladım / İşte Gerçekler (How I Questioned Abdullah Öcalan / Here are the Facts)
- 2019: Dün Bugün Yarın: Bu Kırk Yıllık Uykudan Uyanma Vakti Geldi! (Yesterday Today Tomorrow: It's Time to Awaken From This Forty-Year Sleep!)
- 2022: Sorgu Odasında Apo: Yakın Tarihin Karanlıkları Aydınlanıyor (Apo in the Interrogation Room: The Darkness of Recent History Is Illuminated)
