= Republic Day (Turkey) =

Public holiday commemorating the founding of modern Turkey

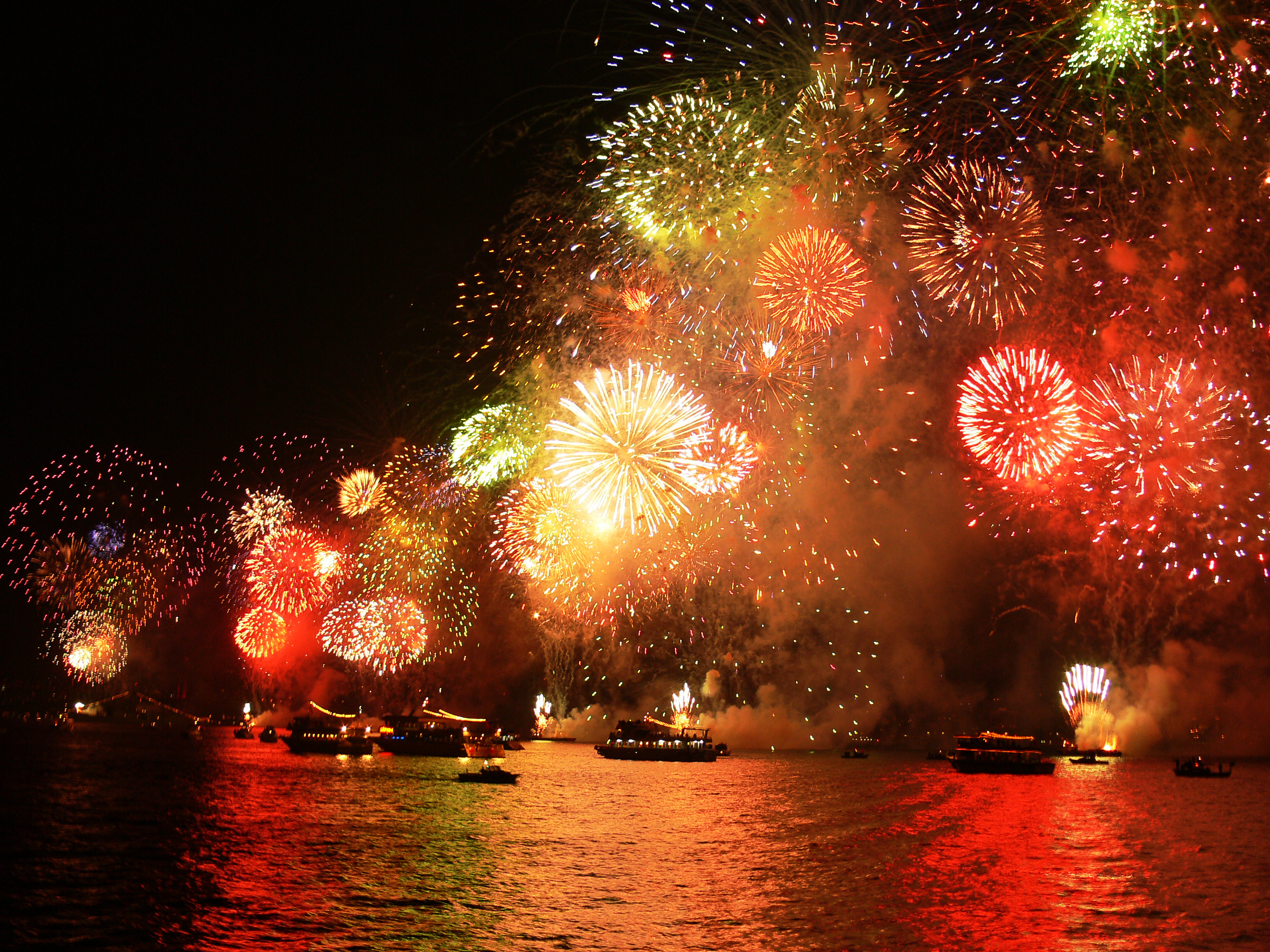
- Displays of fireworks, such as these over the Bosporus in 2007, take place across Turkey on Republic Day.
- Official name: Cumhuriyet Bayramı (Turkish)
- Also called: The twenty-ninth of October (Turkish: Yirmi Dokuz Ekim)
- Observed by: Turkey; Northern Cyprus
- Type: National
- Significance: The day in 1923 that the republic was proclaimed by the Grand National Assembly of Turkey
- Celebrations: Fireworks, concerts, parades, events at schools, cultural programmes
- Date: 29 October
- Next time: 29 October 2027
- Frequency: Annual
- First time: 1923; 103 years ago

Republic Day (Turkish: Cumhuriyet Bayramı) is a public holiday in Turkey commemorating the proclamation of the Republic of Turkey on 29 October 1923. The annual celebrations start at 1:00 pm on 28 October and continue for 35 hours.

== Background ==
The holiday commemorates the events of 29 October 1923, when Mustafa Kemal Atatürk declared that Turkey was henceforth a republic. Turkey had de facto been a republic since 23 April 1920, the date of the establishment of the Grand National Assembly of Turkey (Türkiye Büyük Millet Meclisi), but the official confirmation of this fact came three-and-a-half years later. On 29 October 1923, the status of the nation as a republic was declared and its official name was proclaimed to be Türkiye Cumhuriyeti ("the Republic of Turkey"). After that, a vote was held in the Grand National Assembly, and Atatürk was elected as the first President of the Republic of Turkey, keeping his position until his death.

== Customs ==
Republic Day is a national holiday marked by patriotic displays. Similar to other autumn events, Republic Day celebrations often take place outdoors. According to Law No. 2429 of 1981, Republic Day is a national holiday, so all public institutions are closed on that day. It is also observed by Northern Cyprus.

Decorations (e.g., streamers, balloons, and clothing) are generally colored red and white, the colors of the Turkish flag. Anıtkabir is visited by more than a hundred thousand people every year. Parades are often held in the morning, while concerts, and fireworks displays occur in the evening after dark at such places as parks, fairgrounds, or town squares. Republic Day fireworks are often accompanied by patriotic songs such as the 10th Anniversary March. Istanbul has the largest fireworks display in the country. It generally holds displays over the Bosphorus. Other major displays are in Ankara in Ulus; and in İzmir over the Gulf of İzmir and Gündoğdu Square.

The 2023 Republic Centennial featured, among others, the return of the yearly parade in Ankara and a fleet review of Turkish Navy assets in Istanbul.

== Tenth year speech ==
The tenth year speech was the speech given by the President of the Republic of Turkey, Mustafa Kemal Atatürk, at the celebrations of the tenth anniversary of the republic's establishment on 29 October 1933. This speech not only gave an account of the Turkish War of Independence, in other words, tells about whom, why and how the national struggle was waged, but also contained information about what should be done after the establishment of the Republic.

== Celebration gallery ==
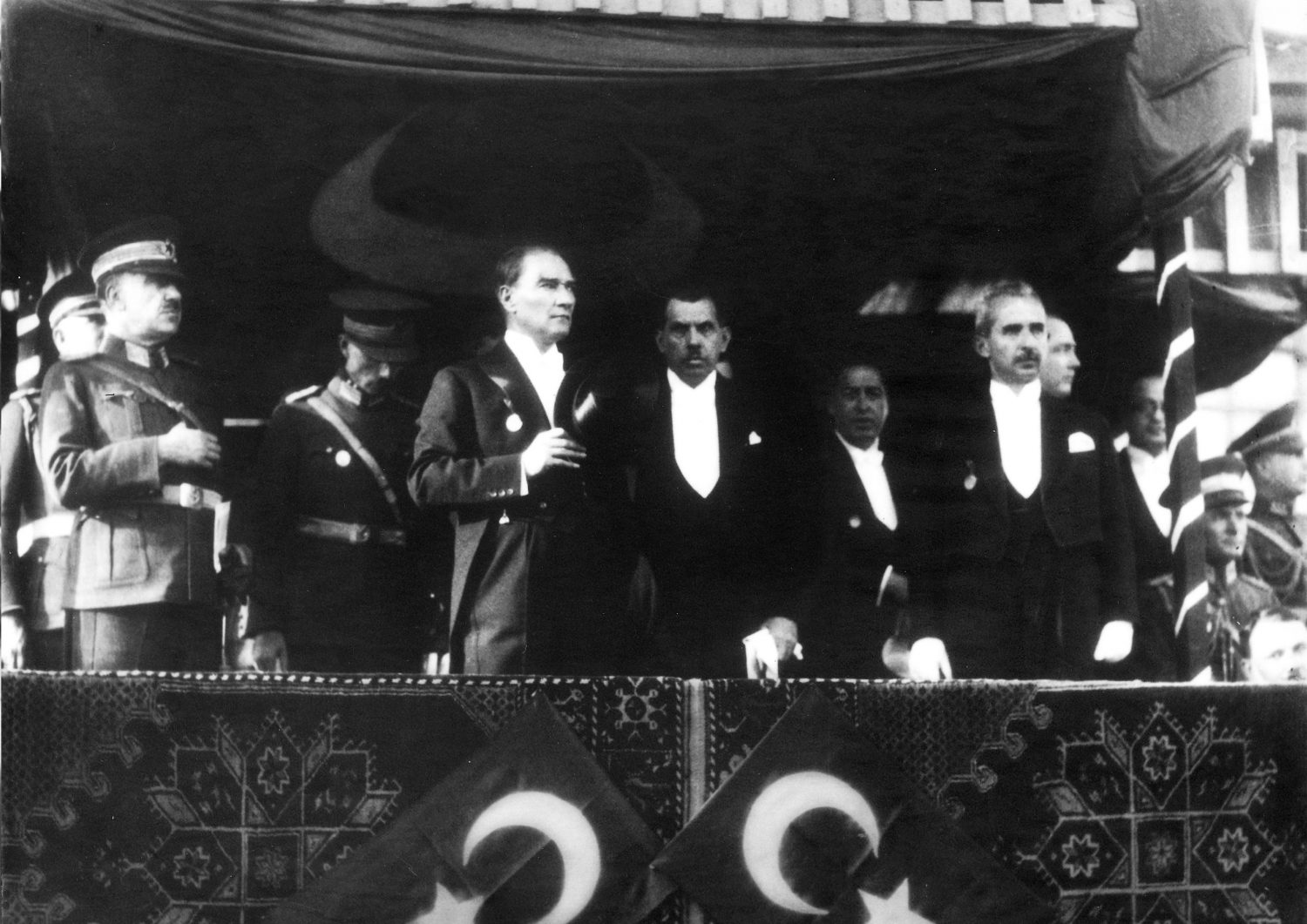
Mustafa Kemal's 1933 speech at the 10th anniversary of the Republic of Turkey, left to right: Chief of General Staff Mareşal Fevzi (Çakmak), President Gazi Mustafa Kemal (Atatürk), Speaker of the Grand National Assembly Kâzım Köprülü (Özalp), Prime Minister İsmet (İnönü)

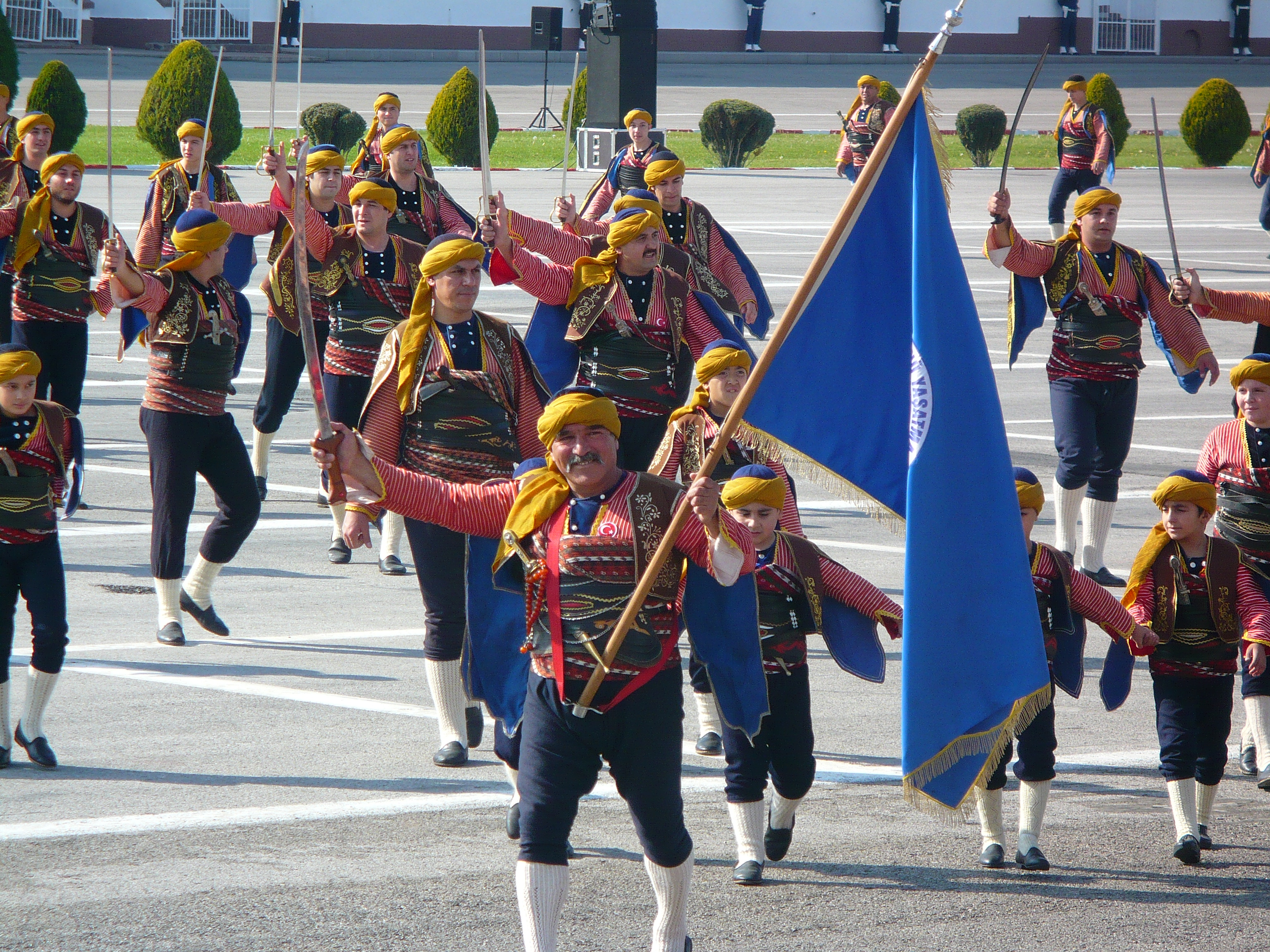
Men marching in traditional seymen costumes (2008)

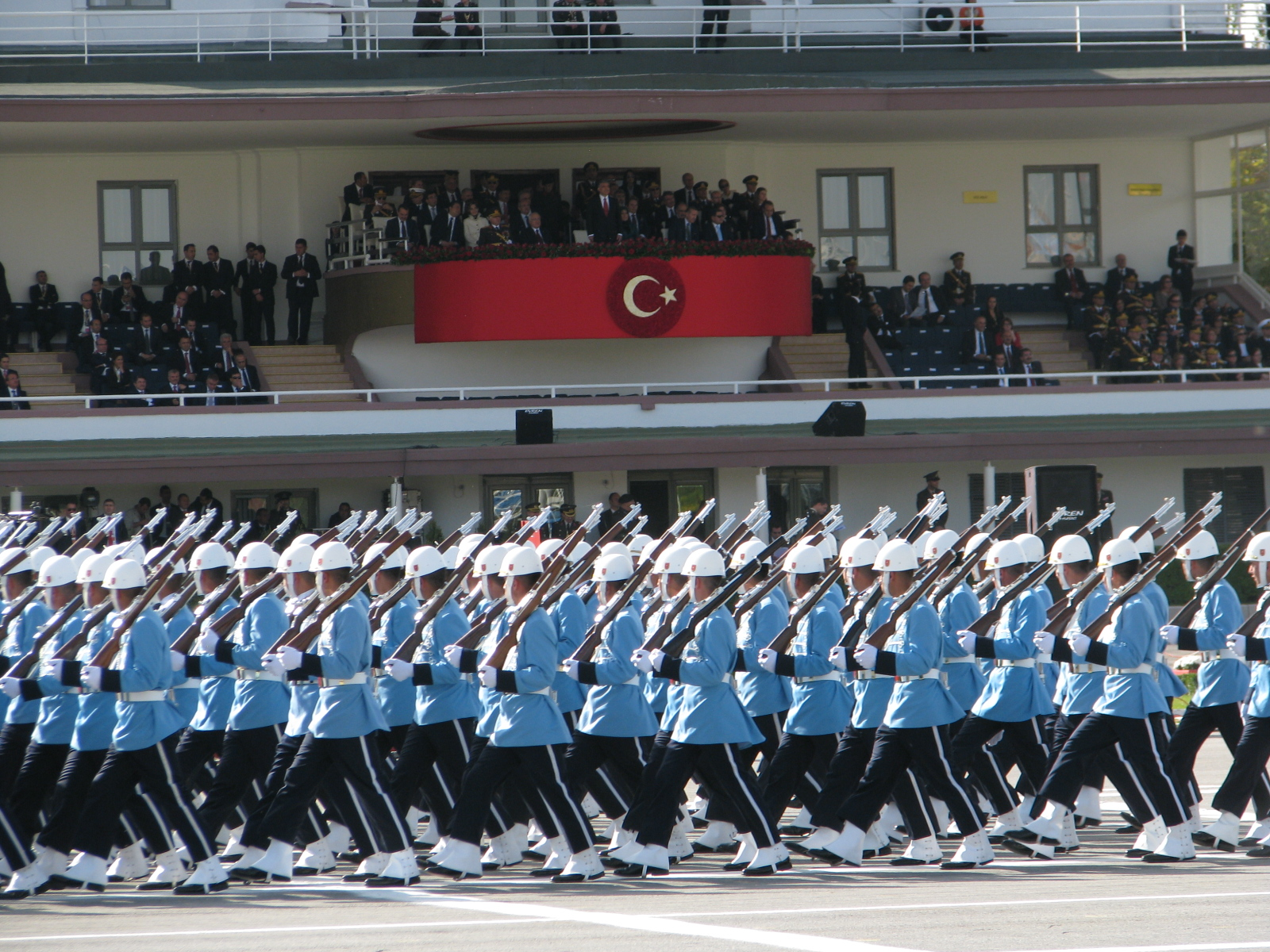
Military parade during Republic Day celebrations in Ankara (2012)

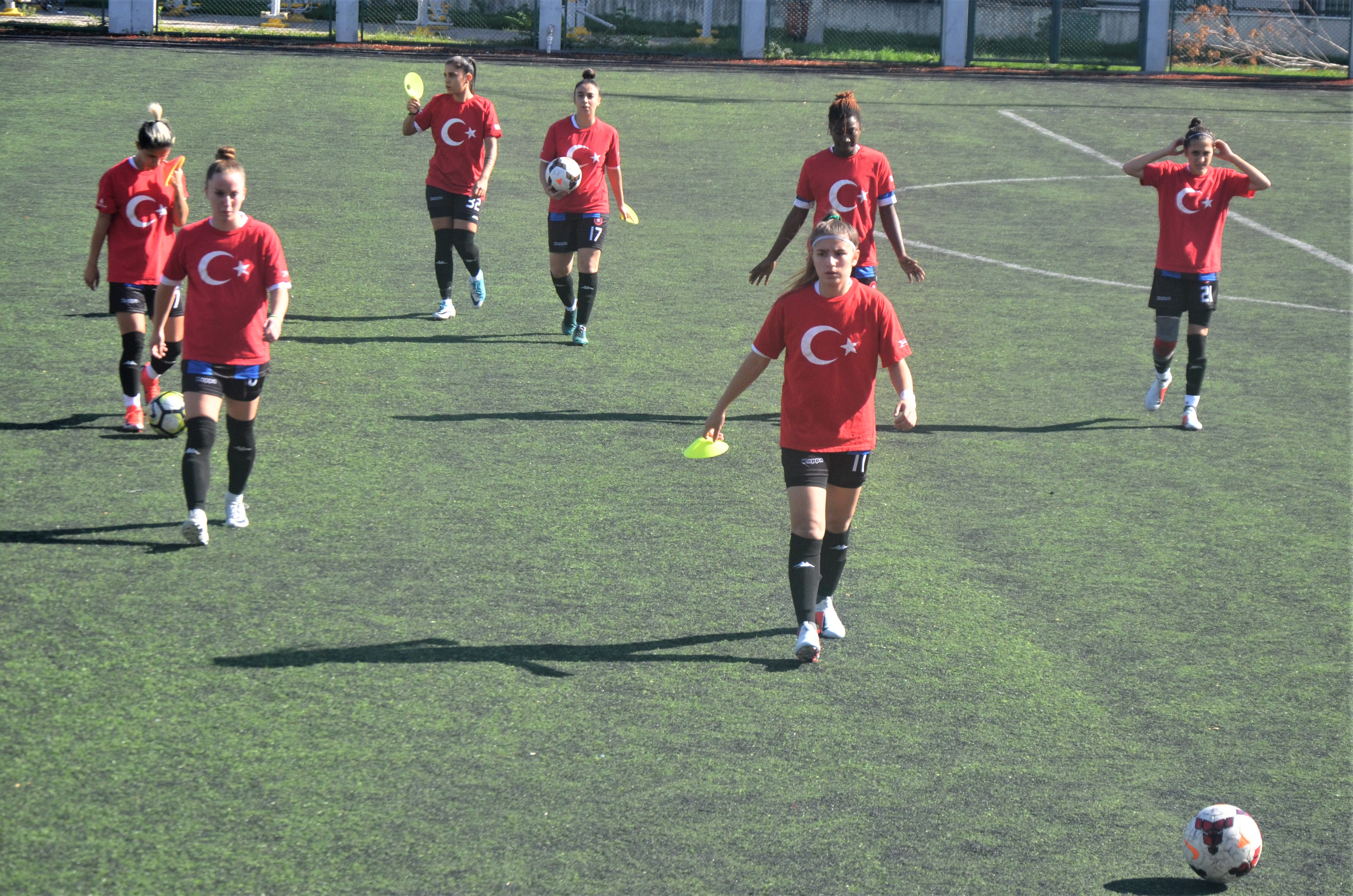
Fatih Vatan Spor women's football players on Republic Day (2018)

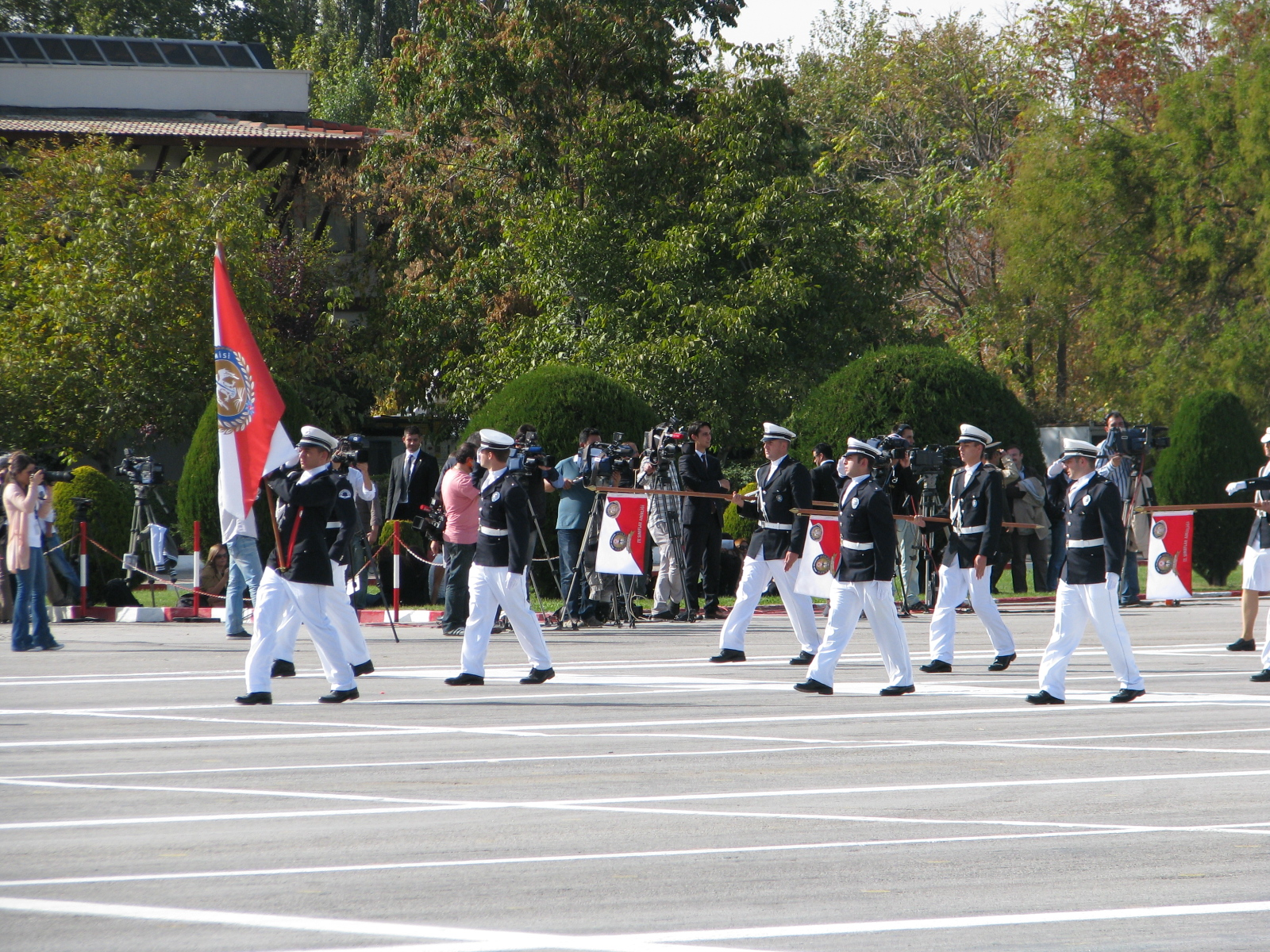
Republic Day Parade in Ankara (2012)

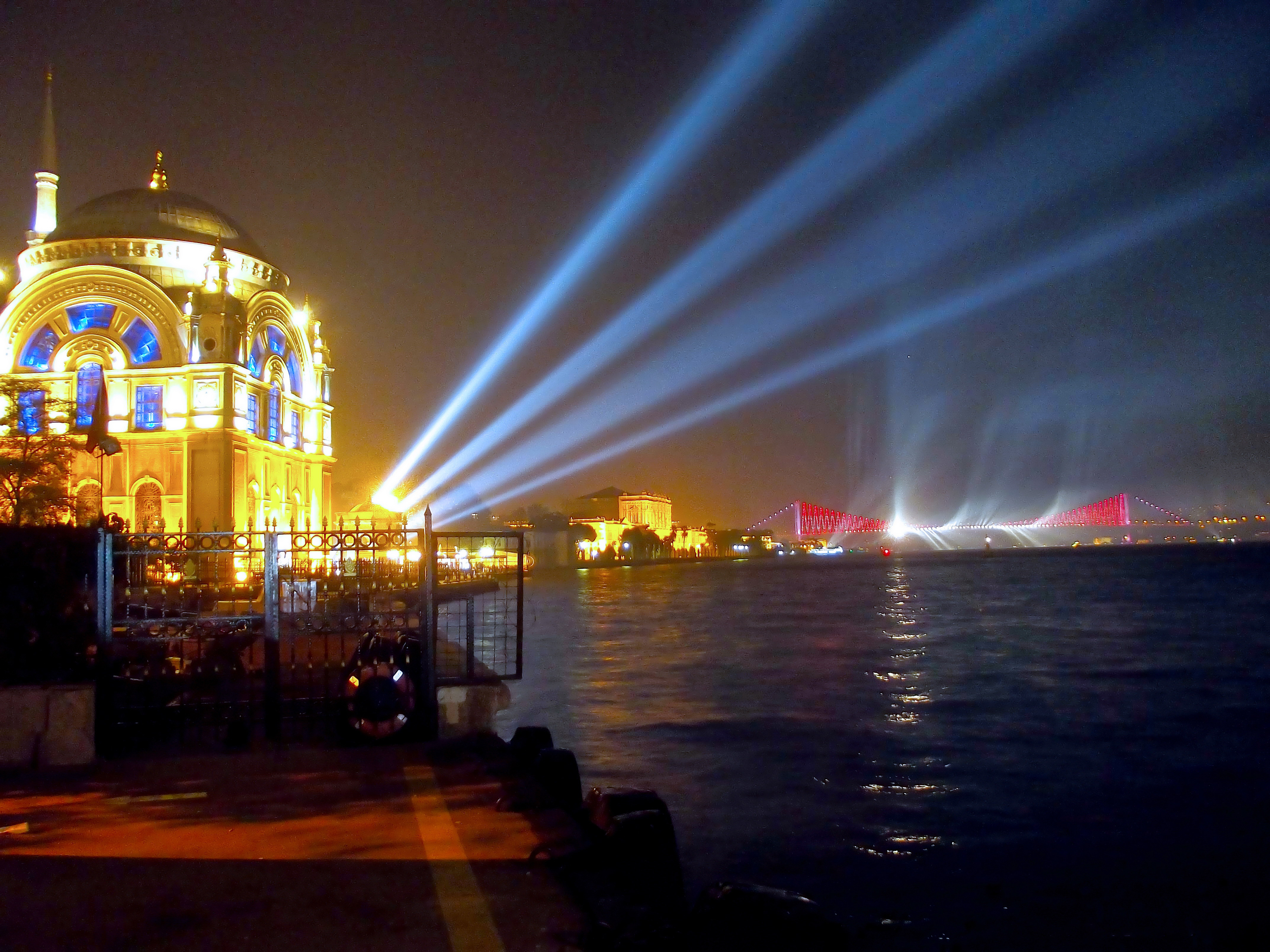
Celebrations at Ortaköy, Istanbul (2013)

== See also ==
- 100th Anniversary of the Republic of Turkey
