= Erol Toy =

Turkish writer (1936–2021)

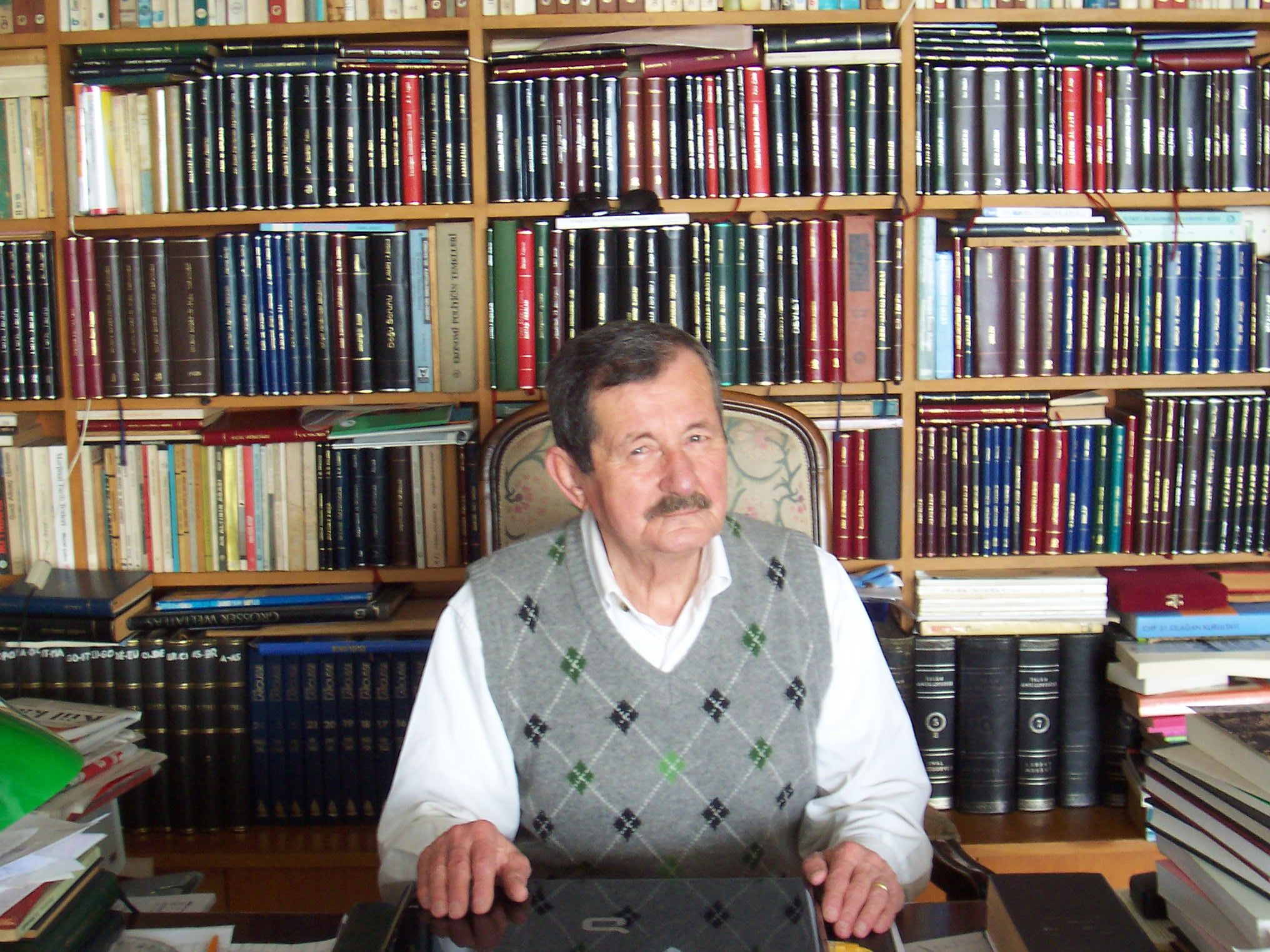
- Erol Toy in 2010
- Born: 1 October 1936; Alasehir, Turkey
- Died: 13 March 2021 (aged 84)
- Occupation: Novelist
- Spouse: Geneviève Toy
- Writing career
- Period: 1952–2021
- Genre: Novel
- Subject: literature
- Website: eroltoy.free.fr

Erol Toy (1 October 1936 – 13 March 2021) was a Turkish writer.

== Biography ==
Toy was born in Manisa, Turkey, and started work after graduating from secondary school. After working as a baker, banker, creator of the mutual organization of sponge fishermen paralysed after decompression problems, he moved to Istanbul. He became a unionist by creating the Bank-İş union. Erol Toy who published his writings in several papers published his first novel in 1952 in the Çınar magazine. As a writer directing the YAZKO council, he wrote on the social, economical and political problems of Turkey. Erol Toy who used social realism, was known to the audience after the first publication of his İmparator (the imperor) novel in 1974. This novel is said to tell the life of Turkish billionaire Vehbi Koç, founder of the Koç group, (this novel was sold to 1.5 million since its publication, according to his publisher). Erol Toy who published short stories, novels, essays and critiques and several plays of which have been acted, received third place at the Ali Naci Karacan prize in 1962. None of his creations was translated yet.

In May and June 2011, his play Pir Sultan Abdal, toured in Germany and in France by Ankara Birlik Tiyatrosu.

== Short stories ==
- Yenilgi – The defeat – 1967
- Iğrıp – The small boat – 1977
- Calculate Age

== Books for children ==
- Fareler Cumhuriyeti – The republic of the mices – 1975
- Altın Saray – The golden palace – 1980
- Son Çağrı – The last resort – 1981
- Avcı Kekliği – Hunting licence – 1982
- Aliş İle Koşka – Alishe and Koshka – 2003

== Novels ==
- Toprak Acıkınca – When earth is thirsty – 1968
- Acı Para – Bitter money – 1970
- Azap Ortakları – Companions of suffering – 1973
- İmparator – The emperor – 1973
- Kördüğüm – The Gordian Knot – 1974
- Son Seçim – The last choice – 1976
- Gözbağı – Blinders – 1976
- Doruktaki Öfke – Angers at the top – 1977
- Kuzgunlar ve Leşler – Crows and deads – 1978
- Zor Oyunu – 1980 – The law of the strongest – 1980
- Kilittaşı – The keystone – 1988
- Yitik Ülkü Cilt −1 – Lost ideal Tome 1 – 1995
- Yitik Ülkü Cilt −2 – Lost ideal Tome 2
- Yitik Ülkü Cilt −3 – Lost ideal Tome 3
- Arinna'nın Gölgesi – On the shadow of Arinna – 2000
- Sır Küpü – The well of secrets – 2004
- Bade Harab – Sour wine – 2010
- Hoca Efendi – Hodja Efendi – 2011

== Plays ==
- Pir sultan Abdal – 1968
- Parti Pehlivan – 1973
- Meddah – The actor – 1971
- Düş ve Gerçek – Dream and reality – 1972
- İzmir'in İçinde – Inside Izmir – 1973
- İpteki – At the end of the cord – 1973
- Lozan – Lausanne – 1973
- Çeliğe Su Vermek – Watering the cuttings – 1980
- Kadınlar Matinesi – The women's morning – 1992
- Kongre – The congress – 1995
- Kırat'ın Süvarisi – 1998
- Dağ Küreden Yer Küreye – 2007

== Essays ==
- Türk Gerilla Tarihi – History of Turkish guerilla – 1970
- Bal Tutanlar – The ones holding honey – 1976
- Aydınımız İnsanımız Devletimiz – Our intellectuals, our people, our State – 1982
- Ordu ve Politika – Army and politics – 1983
- O'na Katılmak – Participate to it

== Stories ==
- Günü Gününe – From day to day – 1981
- Meclisler ve Partiler – Parliaments and parties – 1990
- Yazko'nun Öyküsü – History of Yazko, writers' and publishers' cooperative – 2007
