= Wenzel Fuchs =

Austrian clarinetist (born 1963)

- Born: March 19, 1963 (age 63); Innsbruck, Austria
- Genres: Classical
- Occupation: Berlin Philharmonic Wind Soloists member
- Instrument: Clarinet

Wenzel Maria Fuchs (born 1963 in Innsbruck, Austria) is an Austrian clarinetist.

He studied clarinet at the Innsbruck Conservatory with Walter Kefer and at the Vienna Music Academy with Peter Schmidl. He has performed with the Vienna State Opera, the Vienna Philharmonic Orchestra, the Vienna Volksoper, and the Vienna Radio Symphony Orchestra.

Fuchs became clarinet soloist of the Vienna Volksoper at the age of 19 and five years later solo clarinetist of the Vienna Radio Symphony Orchestra, and was appointed solo clarinetist of the Berlin Philharmonic Orchestra in 1993.

Wenzel Fuchs holds a professorship at the Hochschule für Musik Hanns Eisler Berlin, since October 2008 and teaches in the Berliner Philharmoniker’s Orchestra Academy. He has been a guest professor at Sakuyou Music University in Okayama, Japan holds an honorary professorship at the Shanghai Conservatory, and gives master classes all over the world.

Fuchs is a member of the Berlin Philharmonic Wind Soloists ensemble, the Berlin Philharmonic Octet ensemble, the Philarmonische Freunde Wien-Berlin ensemble, Berliner Philarmonisches Bläserensemble, the Metropolis Ensemble, and the Super World Orchestra.

Wenzel Fuchs has been awarded a Prize of the Austrian Ministry for Science and Art and several prizes in the German national youth competition "Jugend musiziert".

== Discography ==
- Martinu, Nielsen, Koechlin: Serenade, with the Baborák Ensemble. Supraphon SU 3998-2, June 2009.
- Reger: Clarinet Quintet, Op. 146 and String Quartet, Op. 109, with the Berlin Philarmonia Quartet. NAXOS, 8.554510, 2001.
