= Ahmet Reşat Pasha =

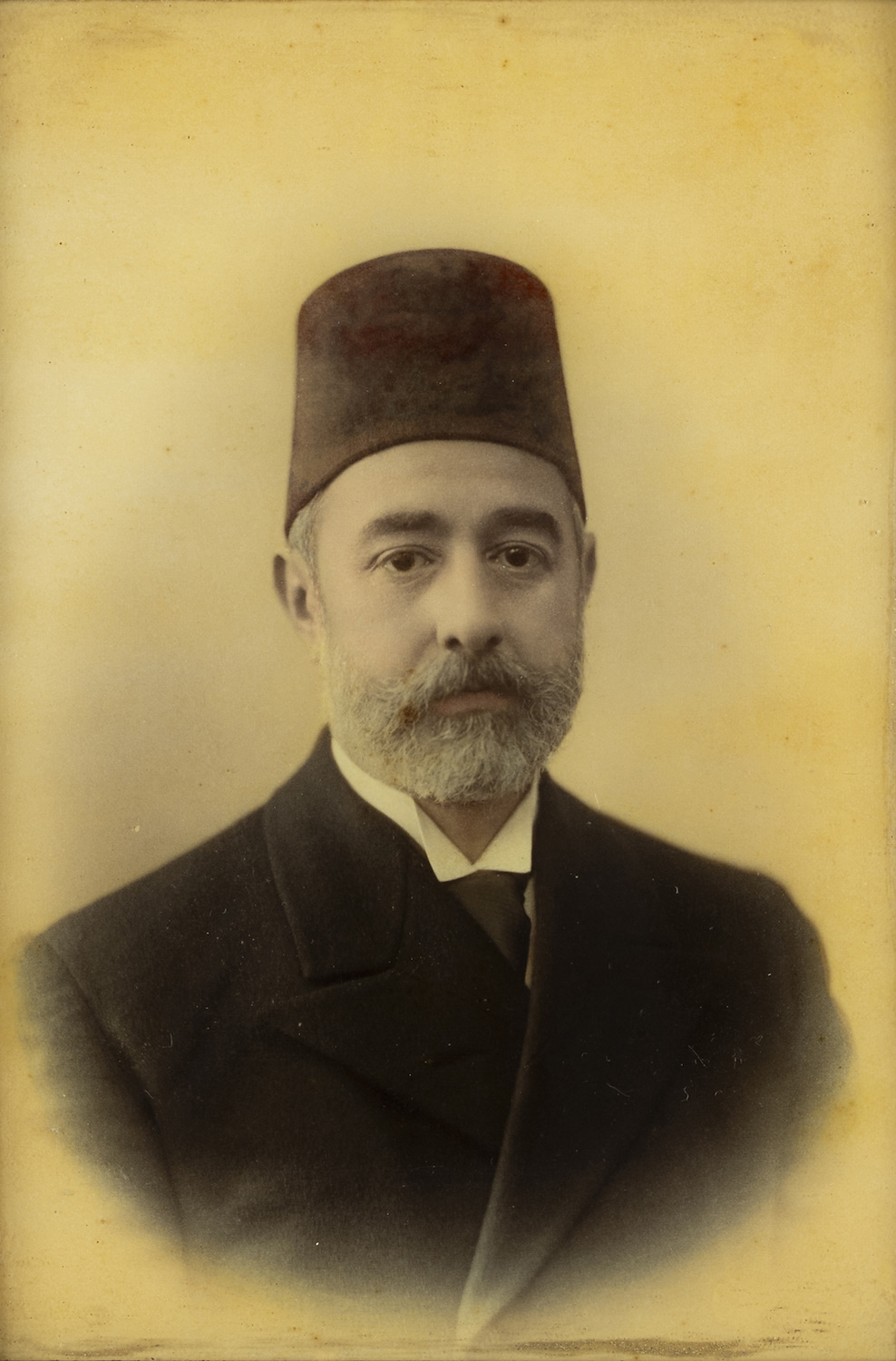
- Born: c. 1849
- Died: 1927

Ahmet Reşat Pasha (c. 1849–1927) was one of the first Ottoman economists with a Western education and upbringing. He lived during the reign of Abdul Hamid II.

== In popular media ==
Ahmet Reşat Pasha plays a role in Ayşe Kulin's 2008 novel Farewell.
