= Peter Bruns =

German cellist and university professor

- Born: 1963 (age 62–63); Berlin, Germany
- Genres: Classical
- Occupations: Cellist, Professor
- Instrument: Cello
- Years active: 1980s–present

Peter Bruns (born 1963) is a German cellist and university professor.

== Biography ==
Bruns was born in Berlin. At the age of nine he began to play cello. After his studies at the Berlin Hochschule für Musik "Hanns Eisler" with Peter Vogler Bruns became the first solo cellist at the Staatskapelle Dresden. Bruns has performed at solo concerts around the world, including the Berlin and Dresden Music Festivals, the Budapest Spring Festival, the Berlin Philharmonic, the Dresden Semperoper, New York Carnegie Hall, London Wigmore Hall, Tokyo and Hong Kong. He has worked with major orchestras such as the Staatskapelle Dresden, the MDR Leipzig Radio Symphony Orchestra and the Konzerthausorchester Berlin.

In 1990 Bruns founded the Dresden Piano Trio together with Kai Vogler and Roglit Ishay. The ensemble performed at concerts all over Europe. From 1993 to 2000 Bruns was one of the artistic directors of the Moritzburg Festival. Between 1998 and 2005 he was professor at the Hochschule für Musik Carl Maria von Weber and since 2005 at the University of Music and Theatre Leipzig. Bruns has been principal guest conductor of the Mendelssohn Chamber Orchestra Leipzig since 2006.

There are numerous radio and CD recordings of Bruns, including complete recordings of the six Bach's suites, the Brahms' sonatas, the works of Gabriel Fauré and Robert Schumann. Carl Philipp Emanuel Bach's concerto in A minor, recorded together with the Akademie für Alte Musik Berlin was awarded the Cannes Classical Award "Best CD of the Year" in 2001. The cellist produced recordings together with other renowned orchestras such as the Staatskapelle Dresden, the Berliner Sinfonie-Orchester and the Mendelssohn Kammerorchester Leipzig.

Bruns plays on a Tononi cello dated 1730, the "Ex Pablo Casals".

== Discography ==
- Charles-Marie Widor: Suite Op. 21. Hänssler Classic CD 98.294
- Charles Koechlin: Chansons bretonnes Op. 115. Hänssler Classic CD 98.258
- Joseph Haydn / Edisson Denissow: cello concertos. Hänssler Classic CD 98.477
- Antonín Dvořák / Josef Suk: Works for cello and orchestra. Hänssler Classic CD 98.478
- Franz Schubert / Robert Schumann: Works for cello & piano. Hänssler Classic CD 98.464
- Carl Philipp Emanuel Bach: Concerto in A-minor. Harmonia Mundi France CD: HMC 901711
- Ernest Bloch: Works for cello. Opus 111 OPS 30–232
- Gabriel Fauré: Complete works for Cello and Piano. Opus 111 OPS 30–242
- Johann Sebastian Bach: 6 Suites for Cello solo. Opus 111 OPS 30-176/77
- Johannes Brahms: Sonata for Cello and Piano No.1 in E minor Opus. 38, Sonata for cello and piano No.2 in F major op. 99. Opus 111 OPS 30–144
- Max Bruch / Dmitri Shostakovich: Kol Nidrei Op. 47; Concerto for cello and orchestra No.2 Opus 126. Berlin Classics 0120012BC
