= Oğuzhan Uğur =

Turkish director and singer

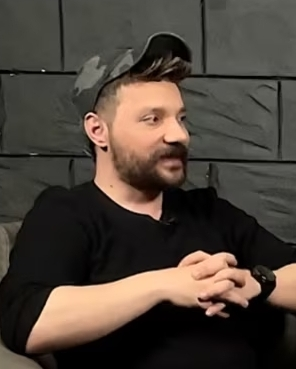
- Born: 29 January 1984 (age 41); Ankara, Turkey
- Occupations: Musician, director, screenwriter, YouTuber
- Years active: 2011–present
- Parent(s): Hasan Atilla Uğur; Pakize Uğur

Oğuzhan Uğur (born 29 January 1984) is a Turkish musician, director, screenwriter and Internet personality.

Uğur was born in Ankara. He is a graduate of Akdeniz University with a degree in fine arts. While in university, he worked as an assistant for Mustafa Şevki Doğan and Osman Sınav. In 2011, he directed and wrote the script for the movie Ağır Abi. In 2012, his debut album, Çok Şükür, was released. Uğur continued his music career by releasing a number of singles. In 2014, he directed the music video for Murat Dalkılıç's song "Leyla". Together they later voiced a duet, titled "Mağlubiyet".

Since 2017, he has been producing content on various YouTube channels, including "Budabi", "BaBaLa TV" and "Onedio". In 2020, he presented the first season of Exathlon Turkey, which was released on Netflix.

== Filmography ==
Year	Title	Role/(Notes)
2011	Ağır Abi	(Director, screenwriter)
2015	Pişt	Batuhan
2016	Bizans Oyunları	Taciroğlu
2019	Kırk Yalan	Tahsin
2019	Borç Harç	Murat
2020	Exatlon Challenge Türkiye	(Presenter)
2021	Oğuzhan Uğur'la Dün Dündür	(Presenter)
2023	Mevzular Açık Mikrofon	(Presenter)

== Discography ==
=== Albums ===
- Çok Şükür (2012)

=== Singles ===
- "Terbiyesizim" (2012)
- "Panpa" (2012)
- "Birinci Vazife" (2013)
- "İstemiyorum" (2013)
- "Sağ Salim" (2014)
- "Bal Prensesi" (2014)
- "Dengi Dengine" (feat. Ege Çubukçu) (2014)
- "Biyolojik Unsur" (2015)
- "Mağlubiyet" (2016)
- "Madım Mı?" (2016)
- "Kıskanç" (2016)
- "Bana Bunu Yapma" (2017)
- "Tarihi Çevir" (2017)
