= Oğuzhan Balcı =

Turkish composer and conductor (born 1977)

Oğuzhan Balcı (born 3 November 1977) is a Turkish composer and conductor and a professor at Istanbul Technical University.

== Biography ==
He was born in Istanbul. He started taking music lessons in 6 years old from Cenan Akın at TRT Istanbul Child Choir and then continued as a chorist at Istanbul State Opera and Ballet Youth Choir.

In 1988, he enrolled in Istanbul Technical University Turkish Music State Conservatory at the violin department and he became pupil of Ayhan Turan. In 1994, he enrolled in composition department of the same university. He studied Turkish maqam music with Yavuz Özüstün, harmony and counterpoint with Nail Yavuzoğlu, Turkish music structure with Mutlu Torun, conducting and piano with Demirhan Altuğ. After the university education, he started to study a master programme in MIAM and during a year studied composition and music theory with Kamran Ince, David Osbon and Pieter Snapper. Then, he graduated from master programme in Haliç University Turkish Music Programme.

His compositions and arrangements are performed by CSO (Presidential Symphony Orchestra), CRR Istanbul Symphony Orchestra, Istanbul State Symphony Orchestra, İzmir State Symphony Orchestra, Bursa Regional State Symphony Orchestra, Çukurova State Symphony Orchestra, Hungarian National Radio Orchestra, Sarajevo Philharmonic Orchestra, Borusan Quartet, Nemeth Quartet.

In June 2006, violinist Hakan Şensoy played as a world premier of Balci's composition which name "Variations on a theme of Aleaddin Sensoy" at Carnegie Hall in New York City.

== Selected works ==
=== For symphonic orchestra ===
- Istanbul Symphonic Suite
- Mavi Gozyasları Suite Ata'ya ( Blue Tears Suite For Atatürk )
- Balkan Overture

=== Concertos ===
- Violin Concerto no. 1 ( Dedicated to Cihat Askin )
- Kemence Koncerto
1. Ninni (Lullaby)
2. Heybeliada (Halki)
3. Tetova' da Pazar Yeri ( The Bazaar in Tetovo )

=== For string orchestra ===
- Büyüsüz Sözcük ( Word without Magic )
- Balat' ta Bir Gölge ( A shadow in Balat )
- Fırtına ( The Storm )

=== For string orchestra and clarinet ===
- Tanımadığım Ruhlara ( To The Souls that I Don't Know )

=== For symphonic orchestra and kanun ===
- Istanbul Hatırası (Memoirs of Istanbul)

=== For string quartet ===
- Quartet no. 1
1. Tanışma (Meeting)
2. Sığınak (The Shelter)
3. Deli Dalga (Crazy Wave)
