= Proclamation of the Republic of Turkey =

29 October 1923 event in Ankara

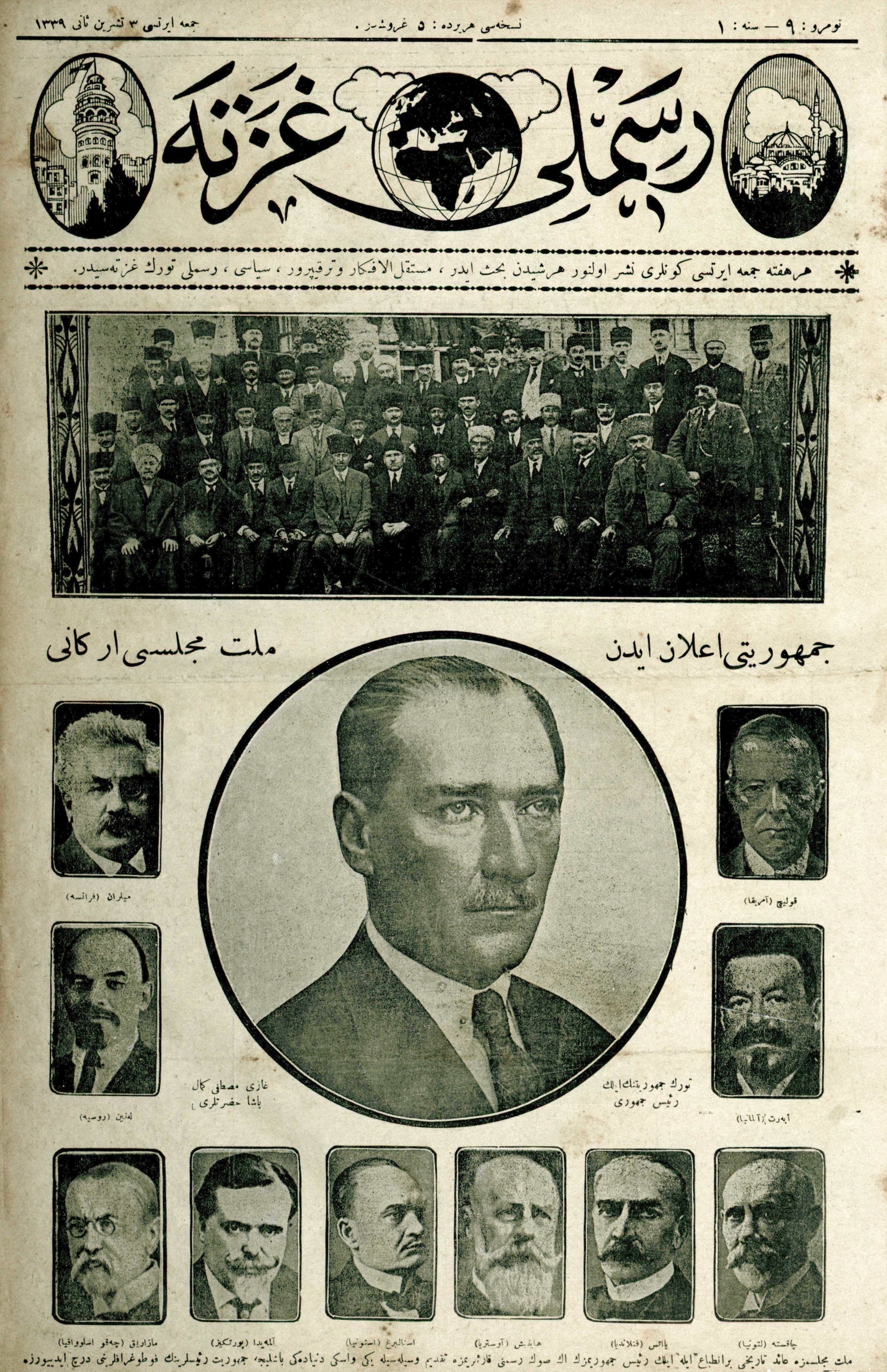
- Declaration of the republic in a newspaper dated 3 November 1923
- Date: 29 October 1923 (102 years ago)
- Time: 20:30 (approx.) (TRT)
- Venue: Grand National Assembly of Turkey
- Location: Ankara, Turkey
- Also known as: Adoption of Law No. 364, dated 29 October 1339
- Cause: Necessity to determine the form of governance for the state; Cabinet crisis arising from the resignation of the government on 27 October 1923
- Outcome: Establishment of the Republic of Turkey; Unanimous election of Mustafa Kemal Pasha as president; Assignment of the prime ministerial duty to İsmet Pasha

The proclamation of the Republic of Turkey (Turkish: Cumhuriyetin ilanı), formally declared during a session of the Grand National Assembly of Turkey on 29 October 1923, established of Turkey's form of government as a republic. This was realized by a constitutional amendment drafted by Mustafa Kemal Atatürk.

In a broader sense, the proclamation of the republic was an integral part of Atatürk's reforms aimed at modernizing Turkish society, constituting a political revolutionary movement that paved the way for other renewal and reforms.

Alongside the "Law Concerning the Amendment Pertaining to the Modification of Certain Provisions of the Turkish Constitution, No. 364, dated 29 October 1339 (1923)", amendments were made to six articles (1, 2, 4, 10, 11, and 12) of the Turkish Constitution of 1921; the first article was modified as follows:

"Sovereignty unconditionally belongs to the Nation. The administrative method is based on the principle of the direct and actual administration of the people's affairs by the people themselves. The form of government of the Turkish state is a republic."

Changes made to other articles of the constitution established the presidency; it was envisaged that the president would be elected by the Grand National Assembly of Turkey from among its members, and the procedure for the formation of the government was altered. In terms of the government's organizational structure, a departure from the assembly government system occurred, transitioning to a parliamentary system.

== Background ==
The Ottoman Empire was governed by absolute monarchy until the year 1876. During this period, the institution of the sultanate exerted absolute sovereignty over the populace. While discussions of the republican ideology began with the Tanzimat era, Ottoman intellectuals deemed the establishment of constitutional monarchy sufficient, and there was no further push for or demand of a more advanced form of governance. The Ottoman Empire was administratively governed under constitutional monarchy from 1876 to 1878 and again from 1908 to 1920.

Following the conclusion of World War I, which resulted in the collapse of the Ottoman Empire, the Turkish War of Independence initiated under the leadership of Mustafa Kemal Atatürk explicitly declared, from its early years, that popular will would henceforth prevail in governance. The third article of the proclamation issued on 23 July 1919, after the Erzurum Congress, stated, "It is essential to make the national forces effective and the national will predominant".

To concretely manifest the national will, a parliament was convened in Ankara on 23 April 1920, known as the Grand National Assembly, after the occupation of Istanbul and the disbandment of the Chamber of Deputies. The president of the 390-member assembly, endowed with extraordinary powers, was simultaneously tasked with heading the government and serving as the head of state.

The Turkish Constitution of 1921, adopted by the assembly on 20 January 1921, declared that sovereignty belonged to the Turkish nation. As a reaction against the continued representation of the Istanbul government as the representative of the Turkish nation, the assembly, on 1 November 1922, voted to abolish the Ottoman sultanate.

After the decision to hold new elections on 1 April 1923, preparations for a new constitution began under the directive of Mustafa Kemal until the convening of the new assembly. The existing constitution affirmed that national sovereignty belonged to the Turkish nation and that the authority to represent this will was delegated to the assembly on behalf of the nation, but did not specify the form of government or a capital. During the preparation of the new constitution, Mustafa Kemal engaged in discussions with those around him regarding the proclamation of the republic. In a statement he made to a correspondent of Austria's Neue Freie Presse newspaper on 22 September 1923, and first summarized in Turkish in the İkdam newspaper, Mustafa Kemal explicitly introduced the term "republic" in response to the correspondent's question, causing significant reverberations both domestically and internationally. In October 1923, İsmet Pasha and a group of deputies submitted a bill to the Grand National Assembly, proposing Ankara be recognized as the seat of government. With the enactment of this single-article law on 13 October 1923, officially designating Ankara as the capital, the contentious debates over the government center being in Istanbul were resolved, and a crucial step toward the proclamation of the republic was taken.

== Evolution ==
=== Government crisis ===
As of 1 November 1922, the country, now devoid of a sultanate, was governed by a parliamentary system. In this governmental system, where each minister was elected by the parliament, it led to a form of government where incompatible individuals came together. Additionally, prolonged debates ensued for each ministry. Members of the newly formed Executive Committee, established after the election of the new parliament, expressed difficulties working under these conditions. The government's weakness became evident on 23 October. Simultaneously serving as the Minister of Interior, Ali Fethi Bey, who was also the chairman of the executive committee, expressed the intention to relinquish the Interior Ministry to Ahmet Ferid Bey. However, the parliament rejected this proposal and elected Sabit Bey (Mehmet Sabit Sağıroğlu), a deputy from Erzincan. Similarly, the deputy speaker of the Grand National Assembly, Ali Fuat Bey, expressed the desire to step down, nominating Yusuf Kemal Bey as his replacement. However, the parliament did not accept this and elected Rauf Bey.

In response to this situation, Mustafa Kemal, the speaker of the parliament, convened the government on the evening of 25 October 1923 at Çankaya. During the meeting, it was decided that the Executive Committee would resign and not participate in the newly elected Executive Committee. Thus, a governmental crisis was created that would lead to the declaration of the Republic.

=== Constitutional amendment proposal ===
After the resignation of the executive committee was read in the Grand National Assembly on 27 October, efforts began to establish a new Executive Committee. However, the opposition's attempts to form a new government did not yield results. On 28 October, during a dinner at the Çankaya Mansion attended by İsmet Pasha (İnönü), Fethi Bey (Okyar), Kazım Pasha (Özalp), Kemalettin Sami Pasha, Halit Pasha (Karsıalan), Fuat (Bulca), and Ruşen Eşref Bey (Ünaydın), hosted by Mustafa Kemal Atatürk, discussions were held regarding the way out of the cabinet crisis, and Mustafa Kemal Atatürk informed his guests that "Gentlemen! We shall declare the republic tomorrow." After dinner, Mustafa Kemal Atatürk and İsmet Pasha prepared the draft law together.

=== People's Party Group meeting ===
On the morning of 29 October 1923, the People's Party Group convened in the parliament to discuss the cabinet change. When the discussions reached an impasse, it was decided to assign Mustafa Kemal Atatürk to resolve the issue. Requesting an hour for a solution, Mustafa Kemal took the floor an hour later, expressing that if the form of government became a republic, there would be no government crises, and for this, the regime needed to be officially recognized as a republic, and the governance structure needed to be arranged accordingly. He presented the constitutional amendment proposal. Following the speeches made during the People's Party Group meeting, the proposal was read in its entirety, and then each article was separately read and accepted.

=== Parliamentary session ===
Immediately after the People's Party Group meeting, the parliamentary session began. While the parliament was engaged in other matters, the proposed bill was formally examined and documented by the Constitutional Committee. The law, accompanied by numerous speakers' applause and cries of "Long live the Republic!" during their speeches, was accepted. Subsequently, a presidential election was held, and with the unanimous vote of 158 members, Mustafa Kemal Pasha was elected as the president.

== See also ==
- 100th Anniversary of the Republic of Turkey
- Republic Day
