= Delphinium caseyi =

Conservation status
- Critically Endangered (IUCN 3.1)

Scientific classification
- Kingdom: Plantae
- Clade: Tracheophytes
- Clade: Angiosperms
- Clade: Eudicots
- Order: Ranunculales
- Family: Ranunculaceae
- Genus: Delphinium
- Species: D. caseyi

Binomial name
- Delphinium caseyi (Burtt) C.Blanché & Molero

Species of plant

Delphinium caseyi, also known as Casey's larkspur, is a flowering plant within the family Ranunculaceae.

Their population is estimated to be at around 100 individuals, which lead to this species receiving a critically endangered status.

== Description ==
Delphinium caseyi is a perennial herb, with an erect growth habit. It can reach heights up to 85 cm (33 in) tall. It possess a thick, woody rootstock. Basal leaves emerge from the base of the stem and leaf stalks can be up to 20 cm (7.9 in) long. Between May and June plants will produce a long and slender stem that hosts a dozen or more flowers. The flowers possess long spurs and hairy petals, which form a dense inflorescence. The flowering period will last from June to July. Like all species within the genus Delphinium, Delphinium caseyi is toxic.

== Distribution and habitat ==
Delphinium caseyi is endemic to Cyprus, where it is confined to only the Kyrenia mountain range where it has been recorded at two sites, one near St. Hilarion Castle, and the other on the Peak of Mount Selvili.

Delphinium caseyi grows in fissures of limestone rock, cliff faces and mountain peaks. It will also grow in mountainous shrubland habitats.

This species is found at altitudes between 800–950 metres (2,620–3,120 ft) above sea level.

== Threats ==
Delphinium caseyi suffers from a severely fragmented habitat and there is a continuing decline in habitat quality. Habitat fragmentation causes patches of habitat to become isolated, which makes it harder for individuals to colonize different areas. This can lead to inbreeding and loss of genetic diversity. Due to having such a small population D. caseyi likely possesses little genetic diversity. Genetic diversity is important as it helps a plant species adapt to changing environments. Lowered genetic diversity puts populations at risk as they are less likely to be able to adapt to threats such as climate change or disease. Populations with lowered genetic diversity are more vulnerable to extinction.

The grazing of livestock by farmers also puts the small population of D. caseyi at risk.

Gathering of D. caseyi for scientific purposes such as to study puts the plant at further risk. Collecting by plant poachers also puts the species at risk. D. caseyi's violet flowers make the species attractive and desirable
