= Mustafa Kemal Atatürk's cult of personality =

Cult of personality surrounding Mustafa Kemal Atatürk, founder of the Republic of Turkey

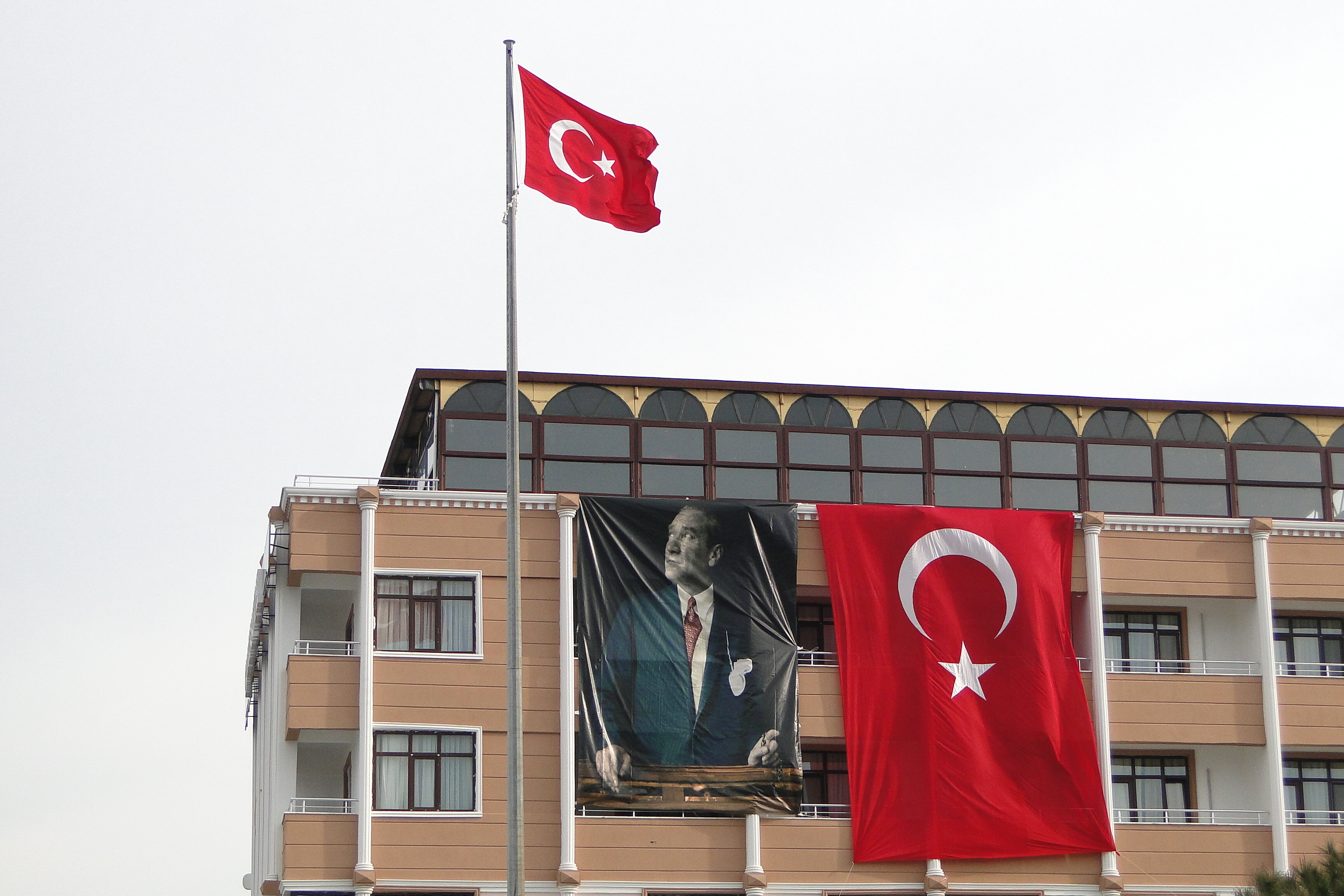
A building facade with Turkish flags and a banner of Atatürk, 2011

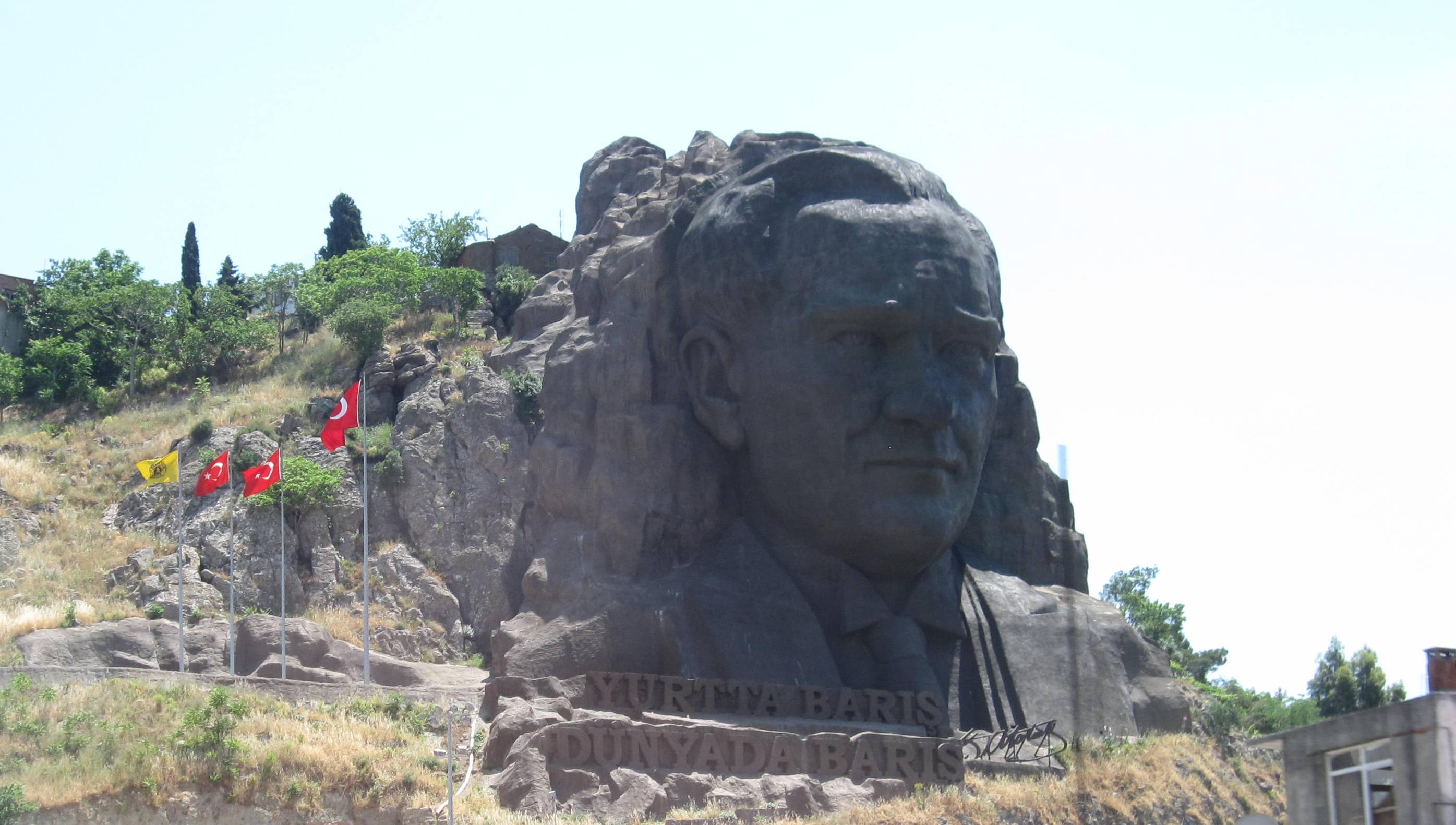
Atatürk Mask, a large sculpture of Atatürk in İzmir

Atatürk's cult of personality, also referred to as Atatürk fetishism, was started during the life of Mustafa Kemal Atatürk and continued by his successors after his death in 1938, by members of both his Republican People's Party and opposition parties alike, as well as by himself, believing that he was "always right". It was established during his lifetime in order to popularize and cement his social and political reforms as a founder and the first President of Turkey.

Atatürk's cult has been compared to the personality cults of the Soviet Union, and has also been referred to as "the most grotesque state-sponsored cult of personality outside North Korea". According to political scientist Mark A. Wolfgram "one can hardly have an honest conversation about his [Atatürk's] life in Turkey today, nor question the legacy of the Republic that he established".

Widely considered a political religion "of grotesque proportions", the cult is noted by Erik-Jan Zürcher as being "by far the longest running political personality cult in the modern world".

== Institutionalization in the Turkish education system ==
I am Turkish, I am honest, I am hardworking. My principle is to protect those younger than me, respect those older, and love my homeland and my nation more than myself. May my existence be a gift to the Turkish existence. — Turkish Student Oath, all students were mandated to recite this

Atatürk's cult serves as a Turkish social engineering project. It was first put into effect in 1924 with the Tevhîd-i Tedrîsât Kanunu (The Unification of Education) law, which served as the primary apparatus for the indoctrination of young children to inculcate future generations and achieve the "ideal citizen", and started dominating the education system in the 1930s. As such, in Turkish schools, Atatürk became an institutionalized presence. According to Adem İnce, "Kemalist indoctrination still makes children believe that Atatürk is a hero, a spiritual guide (akin to a prophet), and even possessing a godlike character". Critical thinking is also undermined by the ideological characteristic of the curriculum, which is prominent throughout the entirety of the Turkish education system, from primary schools to universities.

In every school, there is a portrait of Atatürk, a Turkish flag, a copy of his "Address to Turkish Youth" above every blackboard, a bust of him in every schoolyard and a special "Atatürk corner" (a ritualistic mnemonic device which acts as a state surveillance instrument) in every classroom. In addition, in school primers, love for Atatürk is equated with love for one's parents. In primary school books, many illustrations include photographs of Atatürk and his profile is featured on the cover of the national alphabet textbook adopted by all schools from 1936 onwards. Meanwhile, Turkish school shows, particularly those staged on national holidays April 23, ("National Sovereignty and Children's Day") become tools for transmitting Kemalist nationalist values to children. In the shows, children wear t-shirts with Atatürk's face printed on them, whilst singing military marches and songs.

== Psychological analysis ==
They are after me because I am a Kemalist and I defend the Republic. They follow me to my home, they listen to my phone calls. They want to make an example out of me. All the articles I wrote online are being tracked. The CIA, FBI, and MİT are working together to eliminate me because they know my ideas are dangerous to their new world order. — Turkish psychiatric hospital patient, as cited in Başaran et al. (2025)

Psychologically, the cult has aspects of collective narcissism, projective identification, paranoia, and ressentiment. Etienne Copeaux notes how Atatürk flattered the ego of the Turks and fed into their national narcissism, declaring how "One Turk is worth the whole world!" and how "How happy are those who say, 'I am a Turk!'"; this helped foster the cult to grow and to become extremely prevalent in Turkish society, as it is today. In addition, the followers of the cult have undergone narcissistic injury, i.e. emotional trauma that overwhelms an individual's defense mechanisms and affects their pride or sense of dignity. As such, they seek a glorified leader in Atatürk who can "lift them up". According to psychiatrist Ahmet Selim Başaran et al., records showed how followers of the cult "frequently contained ambivalence (duty, burden, fear of failure) and unfolded as attempts to restore coherence and agency amid disorganization".

Psychologist Sibel Mercan notes how Atatürk represents an "idealized parent imago" (i.e. a narcissistic configuration in which Atatürk is viewed as a fatherly figure who is omnipotent and without any flaws) which fostered a cohesive national unity in the country, which nevertheless failed due to unresolved historical traumas and, subsequently, transgenerational trauma. She concludes that "psychoanalytic perspectives and the strengthening of mental health practices are essential to address collective trauma and support the development of a cohesive national self in contemporary Turkey".

The Sèvres syndrome, a chosen trauma, collective victimhood, and siege mentality, was adopted by the Kemalist habitus and, influenced by Atatürk's personality cult, was subsequently transferred to Turkey's common citizens, remaining prominent in the minds of today's citizens of Turkey.

== The cult as religion ==
Creator, Oh Creator! Not four years, not a thousand years can extirpate your flame in us your voice just like a gleam carrying us away! Oh, eternal blue ocean! Lying there in a piece of marble, in a handful of soil. — Behçet Kemal Çağlar, as cited in Ertit, Volkan (2018): "Secularization: The Decline of the Supernatural Realm".

Atatürk's cult of personality is widely considered to be a form of political religion. In Turkey, he is sometimes likened to a god or a prophet; he is commonly viewed as an "eternal saviour" with his words considered a "gospel" and his deeds a "mythology". For some in Turkish society, he is even seen as "faultless", "great", "almighty", "supernatural" and "divine".

Hagiographic titles depict Atatürk as a secular Mahdi with titles such as: "Grand" (Büyük), "Genius" (Dahi), "Peerless" (Eşsiz), "Savior" (Halaskar), "Eternal" (Edebi), "Deliverer: (Münci), "Great" (Ulu), "Creator" (Yaratıcı), "Exalted" (Yüce) and "Wonder of Humanity" (Beşeriyet Harikası). One Turkish poet spoke of Atatürk as the new prophet with Çankaya (Atatürk's house) replacing the Kaaba. The cult worship is considered to have gone "over the top in veneration". It contributed to the distortion of the official historiography of the Turkish War of Independence.

Many practices and symbols, such as official religious-like ceremonies, mandatory pictures of Atatürk in schools and offices, and writing the year of his death as '193∞' to express his immortality, have been compared to religious rituals and practices of devotion. In addition, in schools and buildings, Atatürk's photograph is widely displayed and he is presented as the new "holy person" who saved the nation, similar to how Jesus Christ is presented in a church's apse.

Anıtkabir, Atatürk's mausoleum became symbolically connected to the Kaaba. Visitors often bend down and kiss the stairs leading up to the mausoleum, whereas plaques bearing Atatürk portraits, which can be purchased at Anıtkabir, bear an uncanny resemblance to Orthodox Christian icons. Some individuals even visit Anıtkabir and pray to Atatürk whilst inside.

Some Turkish Muslims also say how Atatürk is even more significant to them than Muhammad:

However, I forget to mention this as a characteristic of mine. It is an essential part of me. I never compromise on Atatürk’s principles and reforms. If I knew that I would not be committing a sin, I would rank Atatürk after Allah who created and let me live until 63 in good health, I would rank him before the Prophet. Why? That is because it is thanks to Atatürk that I am here, as a Muslim, my name is Basri Özdemir, and my grandmothers and grandfathers had honorable lives in this beautiful country. I owe him even my religion. I would rank him above Muhammad [audience at the studio applauds]

— Haber 7. 2013. Esra Erol’un Programında Olay Sözler, as cited in Ertit, Volkan (2018): "Secularization: The Decline of the Supernatural Realm".

=== Alevi depiction of Atatürk as a divine figure ===
Nationalist Turks who practise Alevism have created a semi-religion out of Atatürk. They incorporated him into their pantheon as the preliminary last link in the long line of divine reincarnations, viewing him as the reappearance of Ali or Hacı Bektaş. In Alevism, it is said that God became manifested in Ali and then took many forms, including Hacı Bektaş. As such, by making Atatürk the reincarnation of Ali and/or Hacı Bektaş, those nationalist Turkish Alevis depict him directly as their god. This phenomenon, however, is not generally recognized in Alevism and is not present amongst non-nationalist and Kurdish Alevis.

== History and supplementary ==
Following the defeat and partitioning of the Ottoman Empire by the Allies in the aftermath of World War I, Mustafa Kemal led the Turkish National Movement through a War of Independence against Greece, Armenia, France, Britain, and other invading countries. Under his leadership, the Republic of Turkey was declared in 1923, and he was honoured with the name Atatürk ("Father of the Turks") by the Grand National Assembly of Turkey in 1934. His other titles include Great Leader (Ulu Önder), Eternal Commander (Ebedî Başkomutan), Head Teacher (Başöğretmen), and Eternal Chief (Ebedî Şef).

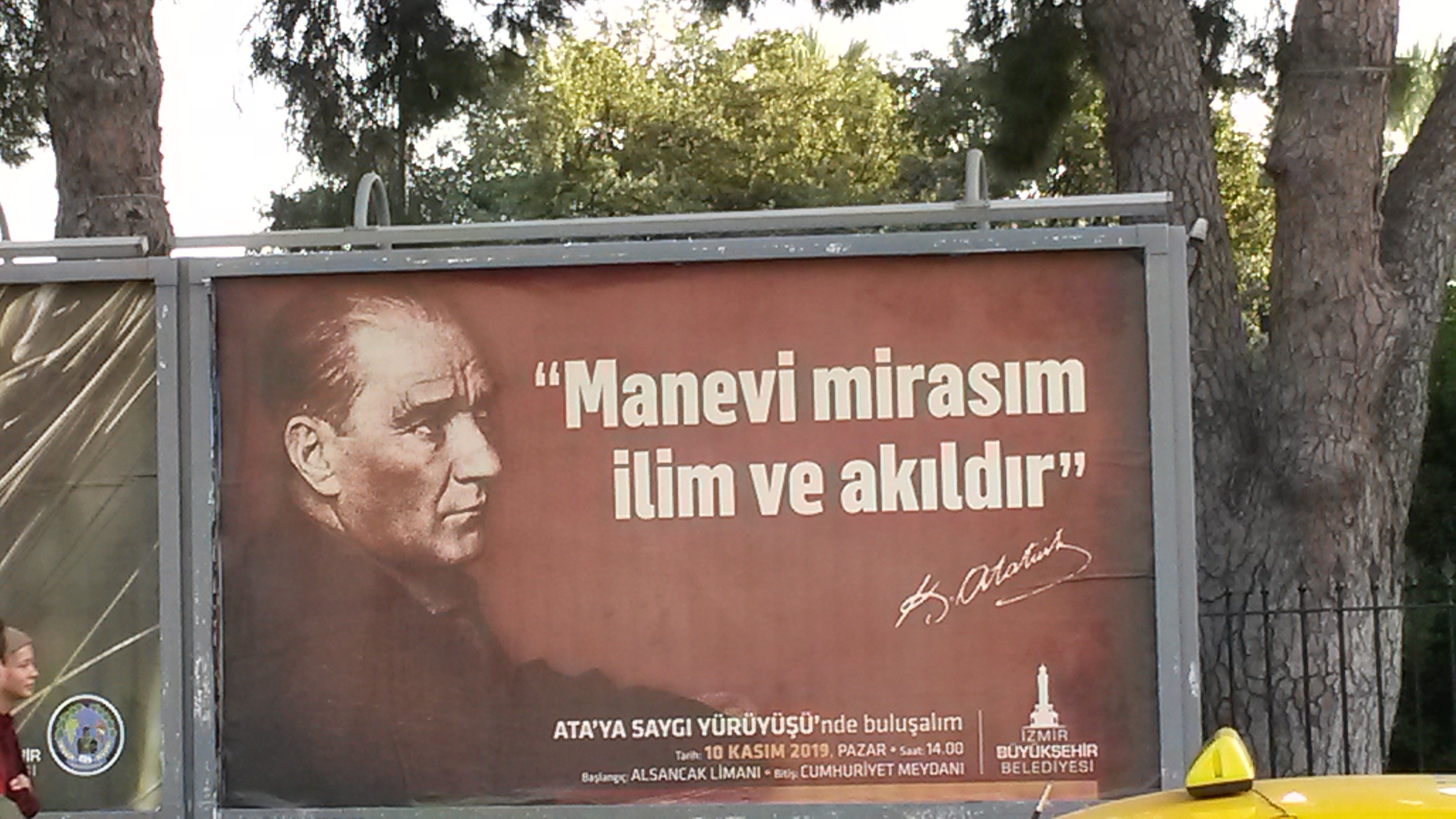
Numerous Turks attend marches and meetings in memory of Atatürk on 10 November, the day of his death. A famous quote is written on this billboard: "My moral heritage is science and reason." Despite this seemingly "pro-science" sentiment, Atatürk espoused and promoted several pseudoscientific and pseudohistorical theories, such as the Turkish History Thesis and the Sun Language Theory.

Atatürk's memory remains a major part of Turkish politics and society into the 21st century. Almost every city in Turkey has streets named for him, and statues of him are commonly found in city squares, schools, and public offices, the latter two of which feature his portrait. The phrase Ne mutlu Türküm diyene (How happy is the one who says "I am a Turk"), which Atatürk used in his speech delivered for the 10th Anniversary of the Republic in 1933, is used widely in Turkey and is often seen along with his statues. It continues to be part of the compulsory Student Oath, though it was removed between 2013 and 2018. It was once again removed in 2021.

Atatürk's cult of personality is sometimes compared to those of authoritarian rulers of Central Asian countries, such as Nursultan Nazarbayev and Saparmurat Niyazov, but differs significantly in light of Atatürk's democratic and progressive reforms in Turkey and because most of the statues and memorials of him were erected after his death. For example, before the 1950s, only the incumbent President of Turkey's image appeared on Turkish currency, but Prime Minister Adnan Menderes (1950–1960), in a political blow to rival President İsmet İnönü, passed a law to restore the late Atatürk's image on the currency in order to deny İnönü's image appearing instead. Menderes's government, although opposed to Atatürk's Republican People's Party (which served as the opposition party in Parliament to Menderes's Democrat Party government), moved his body to a mausoleum 15 years after his death in 1953. It also passed a law in 1951 that criminalized insulting "Atatürk's memory".

The Economist wrote in 2012 that his personality cult "carpets the country with busts and portraits of the great man" and that this has been "nurtured by Turkey's generals, who have used his name to topple four governments, hang a prime minister and attack enemies of the republic". According to this British weekly, "hard-core Islamists despise Ataturk for abolishing the caliphate in 1924 and expunging piety from the public space. They feed rumours that he was a womaniser, a drunk, even a crypto-Jew."

A 2008 article in National Identities also discussed Atatürk's ubiquitous presence in the country:

Atatürk's houses exist in an Atatürk-inundated context with his face and sayings appearing on all official documents, buildings, television channels, newspapers and schoolyards, coins and banknotes. Moreover, regardless of personal belief, every Turk lives in a country where nationalism is part of standard political discourses. Politicians, teachers and journalists appeal to the nation and Atatürk on a daily basis. Yet they are not alone in this. The omnipresence of Atatürk paraphernalia can only be partly attributed to state sponsorship. Atatürk's face appears on posters behind supermarket counters, in barbershops and video stores, in bookshops and banks; Atatürk talismans even dangle from car mirrors, while Atatürk pins adorn lapels. And even the Turks who do not join in with such spontaneous commemorations know how to 'read' the Atatürk semiotic universe.

=== Law on Atatürk ===
Turkish Law 5816 ("The Law Concerning Crimes Committed Against Atatürk") was passed 13 years after Atatürk's death on July 25, 1951, by Prime Minister Adnan Menderes's government, and protects "Atatürk's memory" from being offended by any Turkish citizen. In 2011, there were 48 convictions for "insulting Atatürk" and insulting Atatürk's memory is punishable by up to three years in jail. The law has been interpreted in a very broad way, covering not only the protection of Atatürk's memory, but also of his legacy. Charges have been brought in domestic proceedings against persons who challenge the official, very positive, assessment of the first years of the Republic of Turkey and Atatürk's role.

=== Statues ===
The first statue of Atatürk was sculpted in 1926 in the Sarayburnu district of Istanbul by Austrian sculptor Heinrich Krippel. Today, statues of Atatürk can be found all over Turkey.

== See also ==
- Kemalism
- Atatürk's Reforms
- Benevolent dictatorship
