= Agios Nikolaos, Famagusta =

Agios Nikolaos: Άγιος Νικόλαος (Greek); Yamaçköy (Turkish)
- Location in Cyprus
- Coordinates: 35°19′45″N 33°40′40″E
- Country (de jure): Cyprus
  - District: Famagusta District
- Country (de facto): Northern Cyprus
  - District: Gazimağusa District
- Time zone: UTC+2 (EET)
  - Summer (DST): UTC+3 (EEST)

Agios Nikolaos (Greek: Άγιος Νικόλαος; Turkish: Yamaçköy) is a small village in the Famagusta District of Cyprus, located 8 km north of Psyllatos and 1 km west of Melounta, on the south side of the Kyrenia mountain range. It is under the de facto control of Northern Cyprus. Since 1974, it has chiefly been inhabited by Turkish families from the Black Sea city of Trabzon. The former church of Agios Nikolaos has been converted into a mosque.
