= 1985 Northern Cypriot constitutional referendum =

Northern Cyprian constitutional referendum

5 May 1985

Results
Choice	Votes	%
Yes	49,447	70.18%
No	21,012	29.82%
Valid votes	70,459	97.86%
Invalid or blank votes	1,544	2.14%
Total votes	72,003	100.00%
Registered voters/turnout	91,860	78.38%

A constitutional referendum was held in Northern Cyprus on 5 May 1985. The new constitution put forward by the Assembly of the Republic removed the term limits on the President, increased the number of seats in the Assembly from 40 to 50, set details on citizenship, the national flag and the national anthem, and provided for mandatory referendums on changes to the constitution. It was approved by 70.18% of voters.

== Results ==
Choice	Votes	%
For	49,447	70.18
Against	21,012	29.82
Invalid/blank votes	1,544	–
Total	71,933	100
Registered voters/turnout	91,860	78.37
Source: Direct Democracy
