= Flag of Northern Cyprus =

Turkish Republic of Northern Cyprus
- Use: National flag and ensign
- Proportion: 2:3
- Adopted: 7 March 1984
- Design: A red star and crescent slightly to the left of the centre between two horizontal red bars on a white field.
- Designed by: Emin Çizenel
- Flag of the president of the Turkish Republic of Northern Cyprus
- Use: Presidential Standard
- Proportion: 2:3

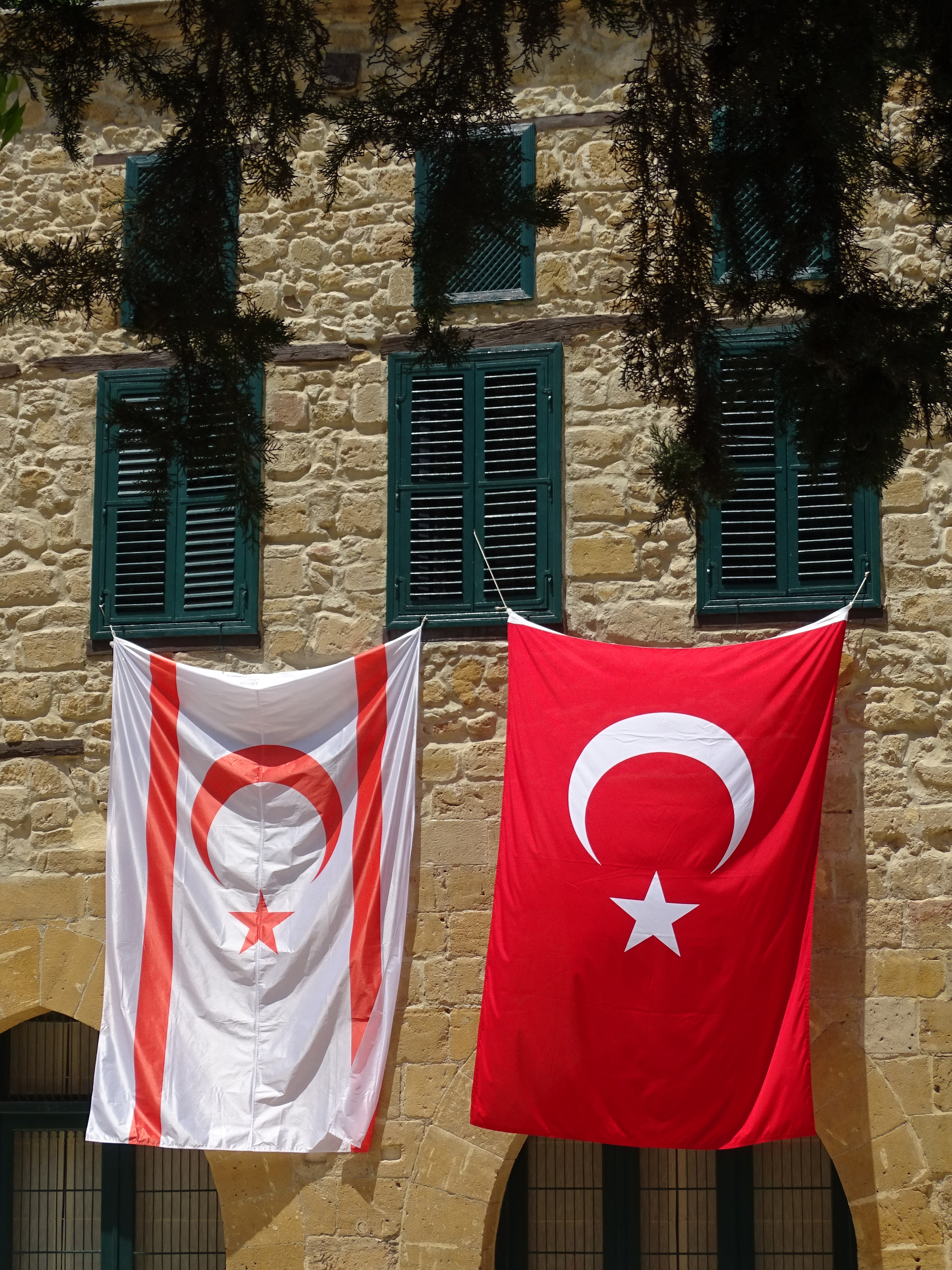
Flags of Turkey and Northern Cyprus, North Nicosia

The flag of the Turkish Republic of Northern Cyprus (Turkish: Kuzey Kıbrıs Türk Cumhuriyeti Bayrağı) is the national flag of the Turkish Republic of Northern Cyprus and which is based on the flag of Turkey, with the colors reversed and two additional horizontal red stripes at the top and bottom. The flag was drawn by the Turkish Cypriot artist Emin Çizenel. It was adopted in 1984 by Northern Cyprus, a self-declared state that is recognized only by Turkey, after its unilateral declaration of independence in 1983.

Although there is no official statement on the meaning of the flag, it can be interpreted as the star and crescent meaning Turkishness, the red color representing the blood of the Turkish Cypriots, and the stripes indicating Turkey (top) and Northern Cyprus (bottom). Before the current flag, the flag of Turkey was used.

The country's flag is officially determined by its law, and it has several other laws that specify where and when the flag should be flown and also laws against insulting or burning of the flag. It can also be flown at half-mast, commonly to commemorate Mustafa Kemal Atatürk, founding father and first President of Turkey, but also in case if the premiership issues an order to do so. Several of these laws also apply to the flag of Turkey, which has official status in the country.

On the side of Beşparmaklar Mountain, in the Kyrenia Mountains, there is a wide flag of Northern Cyprus along with a star and crescent and the quotation How happy is the one who says I am a Turk.

== Design and symbolism ==
The flag of Northern Cyprus was defined in Article 2 of the Flag Law of the Turkish Republic of Northern Cyprus under these terms: "The flag of the Turkish Republic of Northern Cyprus has, under the conditions defined by law, a red star and crescent on a white background and two longitudinal lines".

There aren't any official statements about the meaning of the flag. An interpretation is that the star and crescent represent Turkishness, red representing the blood of Turkish Cypriots killed in Cypriot intercommunal violence, white representing peace, the upper line representing Turkey, the bottom line representing Northern Cyprus and the horizontality of the lines represents that "The Turkish Republic of Northern Cyprus will last forever".

In 2019, the flag became the subject of a conspiracy theory falsely claiming it was designed by Necmettin Erbakan and that the upper line represents the Nile, and the bottom one represents the Euphrates while the star and crescent mean the "land between the Nile and the Euphrates will not be for Zionists as long as Turkey exists". The theory was based on allegations claiming two blue stripes on the flag of Israel represent the Nile and Euphrates rivers and allege that Israel desires to eventually seize all the land in between.

=== Dimensions ===
Construction sheet as published in the official website of Ministry of National Education of Northern Cyprus

Letter	Measure	Length
G	Width	1 G
A	Distance of the centre of the external circle of the crescent from the heading	1/2 G
B	Diameter of the external circle of the crescent	1/2 G
C	Distance between the internal and external centres of the crescent	1/16 G
D	Diameter of the internal circle of the crescent	2/5 G
E	Distance between the star's circle and the internal circle of the crescent	1/3 G
F	Diameter of the star's circle	1/4 G
L	Length	1 1/2 G
M	Width of the heading	1/30 G
N	Width of red stripes	1/10 G
O	Width of white stripes	1/10 G

Note that the proportions are, except for the added stripes, exactly the same that the Turkish national flag, presumably on purpose.

=== Color scheme ===
Vertical format.

Colour scheme	Red	White
RGB	227-10-23	255-255-255
Hexadecimal	#E30A17	#FFFFFF
CMYK	0, 96, 90, 11	0, 0, 0, 0

== History ==
=== Previous flags ===
Flag chosen by the Council of Ministers on 17 November 1983

Flag of Turkey, which was used as flag of Northern Cyprus in the first four months of its existence according to the Flag Bulletin

The Turkish Federated State of Cyprus was formed on 13 February 1975 and existed until 15 October 1983, when the Turkish Republic of Northern Cyprus was established. TFSC didn't mention a flag in its constitution.

3 days after the declaration of independence of the Turkish Republic of Northern Cyprus, a self-declared state that is recognized only by Turkey, on 18 November 1983, the Council of Ministers of Northern Cyprus discussed the flag of the new state. It was decided to use the flag of Cyprus with the flag of Turkey placed in the canton (upper left). However, the design was never used. According to an article in the Flag Bulletin, for the first four months of its existence, the flag of Turkey was used as the official flag of Northern Cyprus.

=== Current flag ===
On 23 November 1983, the government officially called for a new flag for the country and asked for flag suggestions from all citizens, establishments and foundations being 3 December 1983 the deadline. The design drawn by Turkish Cypriot artist Emin Çizenel was accepted and it was officially adopted as the flag of Northern Cyprus on 7 March 1984 by Law No.15 of constitution of Northern Cyprus. Flag Law of Northern Cyprus was adopted the same day. The Official Gazette published the flag on 9 March 1984. Even though there wasn't a promised prize, on 9 March 1984 Emin Çizenel received the award of TL100,000, which was the same amount given to Mehmet Akif Ersoy for writing İstiklal Marşı (national anthem of Turkey and Northern Cyprus) in 1921.

=== Proposed national flag ===
Flag of the United Republic of Cyprus chosen by a committee of Greek and Turkish Cypriots in early March 2004

The Annan Plan was a United Nations proposal to restructure the Republic of Cyprus as a federation of two states under the name of "United Republic of Cyprus" to settle the Cyprus dispute. A Spanish fess flag made up of three white fimbriated blue, red and orange-yellow lines were chosen for the federation by a committee of Greek and Turkish Cypriots in early March 2004. The current flag of Northern Cyprus was planned to be used as the flag for the Turkish Cypriot State of the federation.

The blue stripe represented Greeks while the red stripe represented Turks, two major ethnic groups in Cyprus and the orange-yellow stripe represented copper, from which the island may have received its name. The meaning of white fimbriation wasn't officially stated but an interpretation is that it represented peace between the two communities.

In a 2004 referendum, the plan was accepted by 65% of Turkish Cypriots but 76% of Greek Cypriots opposed it, therefore the plan was not put into place.

=== List ===
Flag	Date	Use	Description
	1974–1984	De facto flag of Northern Cyprus	Flag of Turkey used during the invasion and then by the Turkish Federated State of Cyprus and Northern Cyprus until 7 March 1984.
	1984–present	Flag of Northern Cyprus	Current flag of the Turkish Republic of Northern Cyprus

== Protocol ==
Article 2 of the Constitution of Northern Cyprus states that the flag of the country is prescribed by law. According to Article 3 of the Flag Law of Northern Cyprus, "The flag of the Turkish Republic of Northern Cyprus shall be flown from buildings occupied by the Security Forces, by Government Departments, from the premises of public institutions and establishments, from the premises of the people's representatives abroad and vessels owned by persons and corporate bodies and it shall be displayed on motor cars, in and outside the country, of persons authorized by regulations to display the flag on their motor cars".

=== Outlawed actions ===
Article 10 of the Flag Law of Northern Cyprus outlaws tearing, burning, removing it from its location with a purpose of insult and throwing down flags of both Northern Cyprus and Turkey. The same article also outlaws the insult either "by words, writings, actions or any other manner" of the flag of Northern Cyprus and Turkey. Article 11 punishes such actions with up to 9 years of imprisonment and/or a fine of TL100,000 if they were carried out on purpose.

=== Half-mast ===
The flag of Northern Cyprus is flown at half-mast throughout the country every 10 November in memory of Mustafa Kemal Atatürk, founding father of the Republic of Turkey who died on 10 November 1938. At other times, the premiership may issue an order for the flag to be flown at half-mast. Notable dates of half-mast in Northern Cyprus include 7 November 2006 due to the death of Bülent Ecevit, Prime Minister of Turkey at the time of the Turkish Invasion of Cyprus, 14–20 January 2012 due to the death of Rauf Denktaş, founding president of Northern Cyprus, 15–16 May 2014 due to the Soma mine disaster, 22–24 July 2014 due to the 2014 Israel–Gaza conflict, 11–13 October 2015 due to the 2015 Ankara bombings, 29 July 2016 due to the 2016 Atatürk Airport attack and 11 December 2016 due to the December 2016 Istanbul bombings.

== Kyrenia Mountain Range ==
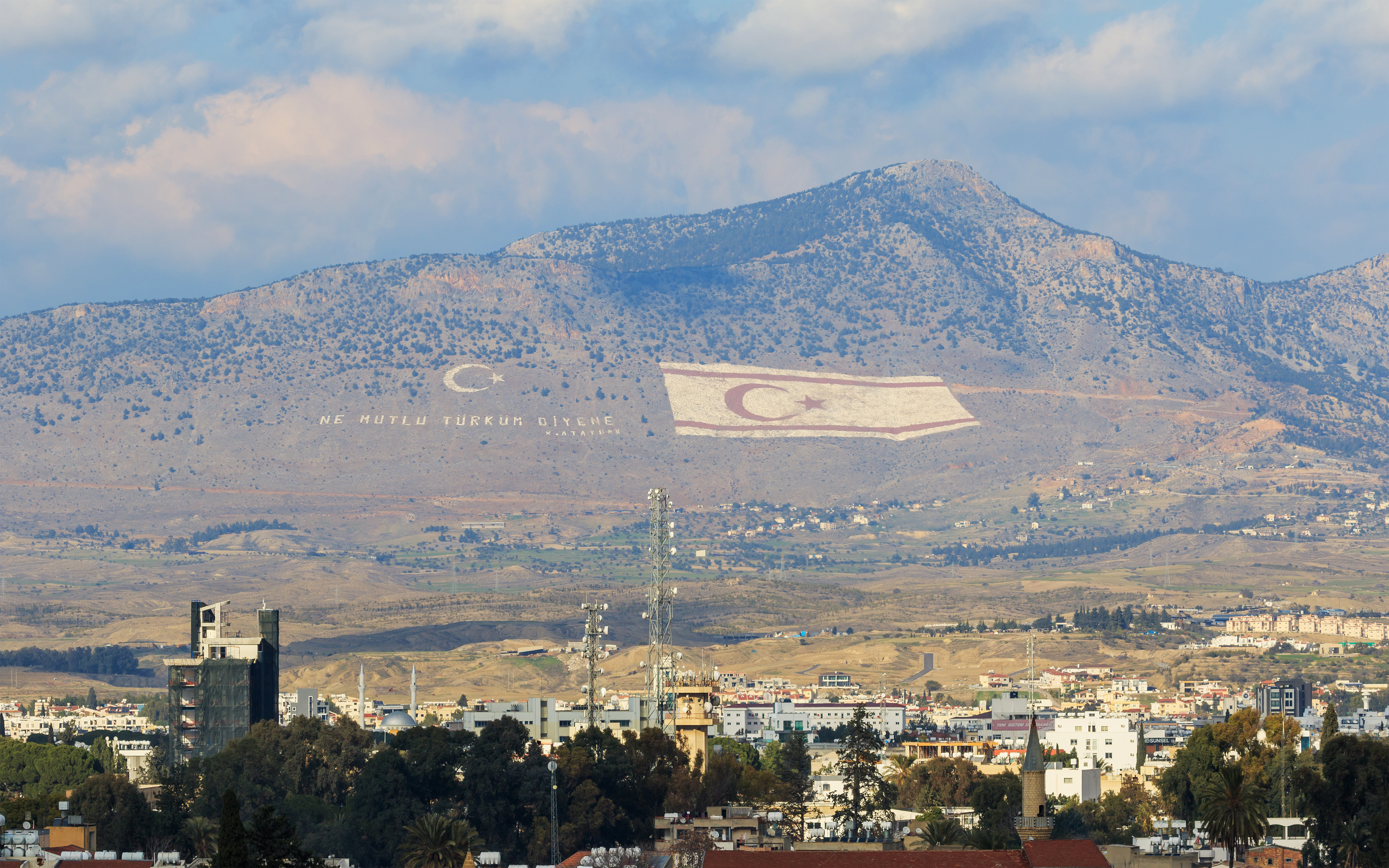
"Ne mutlu Türküm diyene" motto, national emblem of Turkey and the flag of Northern Cyprus on the Kyrenia Mountains in Northern Cyprus

A 426 metres (1,398 feet) wide North Cypriot flag image was drawn on the side of Beşparmaklar Mountain (Mount Pentadaktylos "Five Fingers" in Greek), in the Kyrenia Mountains, facing south (35.282902°N 33.375263°E). The star and crescent, a national emblem of Turkey, and the quotation "Ne mutlu türküm diyene" ("How happy is the one who says I am a Turk"), a motto of Kemalism, is written next to it. Located on the northern side of the green line in the divided capital Nicosia, it is widely visible in the south. An early version was made in the 1980s with stones; now teams from Turkey maintain the coloring with dyes.

=== Criticism ===
In 2010, Antigoni Papadopoulou, a Greek Cypriot Member of the European Parliament, submitted an official written question about the mountain flag to the EU Commission. The complaint framed it as an environmental hazard because of the chemical substances employed, and a waste of energy for the thousands of lights used to illuminate it at night. It also described the flag, first lit up on the Greek National Day, 28 October 2003, as an "unprecedented daily provocation" and a "hostile action", and requested that sanctions be imposed on Turkey for its conduct. The commission promised to launch an investigation into the environmental impact but declined to comment on the political aspects.

== See also ==
- Flag of Turkey
- Flag of Cyprus
- Flag of Israel
- Coat of arms of Northern Cyprus
- İstiklal Marşı
- Gallery of flags with crescents
