= Melounta =

Melounta: Μελούντα (Greek); Mallıdağ (Turkish)
- Village
- Location in Cyprus
- Coordinates: 35°19′57″N 33°41′18″E
- Country (de jure): Cyprus
  - District: Famagusta District
- Country (de facto): Northern Cyprus
  - District: Gazimağusa District
- Time zone: UTC+2 (EET)
  - Summer (DST): UTC+3 (EEST)

Melounta (Greek: Μελούντα; Turkish: Mallıdağ), is a village in the Famagusta District of Cyprus, located 9 km north of Lefkoniko, or Gecitkale, on the south side of the eastern Pentadaktylos mountain range. It is under the de facto control of Northern Cyprus. Agios Nikolaos (Yamacköy) is its neighbour village, situated 500 meters to the East. Melounta is located roughly at the same distance respectively to Northern Cyprus' main cities North Nicosia, Famagusta, and Kyrenia. The vast majority of its approximately 200 inhabitants are Turkish Cypriots, considerably outnumbered by small livestock and chickens.

The fields to the West, South, and East of the village, are renowned for their fertility. Among others, barley, carobs, olives, and watermelons are cultivated here. Additionally, according to season, capers, wild asparagus, thyme, snails, vipers, huns, and a variety of edible berries are awaiting the collector in the immediate vicinity of Melounta.

As typical for the area, almost every home has its wine bower, its herb garden, its jasmine and bougainvillea, and its trees, predominantly lemons, figs, pomegranates, almonds, tangerines and peaches.

Melounta is currently not connected to any public transport system. It has neither pharmacy, nor filling station, school, police station or post office. Nevertheless, it features a corner shop, a carpenter's workshop, a school bus service, a mosque, as well as a children's playground and a mayoral café right at the entrance to the village. The chief means of transport in, from, and to Melounta are private automobiles and red-coloured "Massey Ferguson" tractors.

Melounta has clean potable tap water, fresh mountain breezes, and moderate temperatures in comparison to the nearby Mesaorian plains.
