= How happy is the one who says I am a Turk =

The closing words of Kemal Atatürk's Tenth-Year Address in 1933

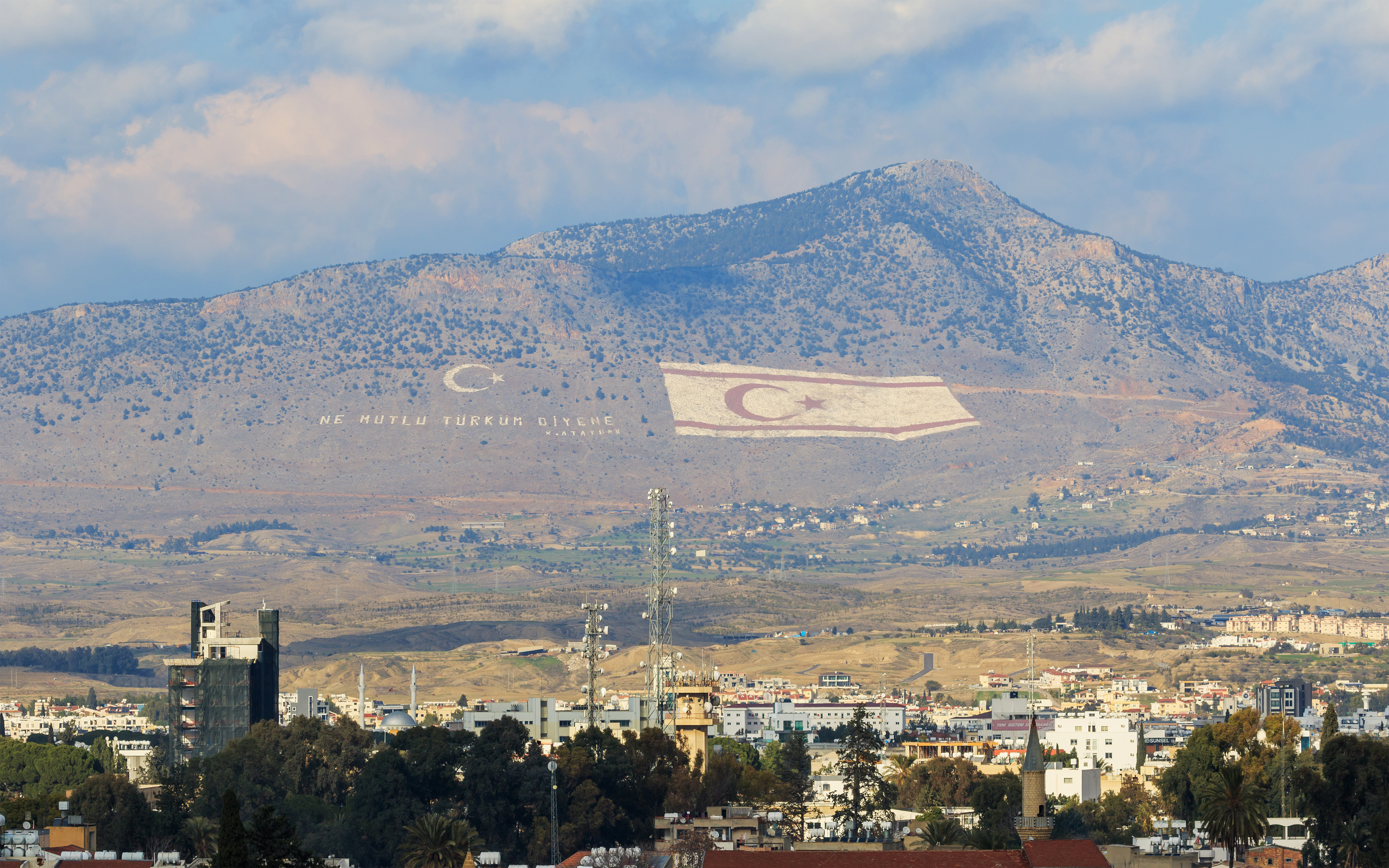
The motto Ne mutlu Türküm diyene and the Northern Cyprus flag on the Kyrenia Mountains in Turkish-occupied Northern Cyprus

"How happy is the one who says I am a Turk" (Turkish: Ne mutlu Türküm diyene, pronounced [ˈne mutˈɫu ˈtyɾcym dijeˈne]) is the final and concluding sentence of Mustafa Kemal Atatürk's speech delivered for the 10th anniversary of the Republic of Turkey on 29 October 1933.

In his speech, Atatürk speaks of the achievements of the Republic, established after the defeat in World War I, and the hope it offers for the future, concluding his speech by stating that this is a reason for every Turk to have hope. However, this phrase was later taken out of context and transformed into a nationalist slogan and an unofficial national motto.

In 1972, the Turkish Ministry of National Education added this phrase to the Student Oath, which is recited daily in schools. This decision was annulled by the AKP government in 2013, before it was reinstated by the Council of State in 2018; however, the Ministry of Education appealed the order and the Council of State again repealed the Student Oath in 2021.

Locations that the slogan appear include Turkish-occupied Northern Cyprus, Eastern Anatolia, and in Artvin, captured from Georgia during the 1921 Turkish invasion of Georgia.

== Criticism and controversial uses ==
The motto has been criticized for its association with Turkish nationalism, particularly the privileging of Turkish national identity over that of minority populations. Political scientist Ilia Xypolia argues that, although the slogan may be interpreted as an expression of inclusive civic nationalism because it presents Turkish identity as a matter of voluntary identification, such interpretations obscure the racial and ethnic elements of early Kamalist Republican nationalism.

The slogan is also associated with policies of Turkification. International relations scholar Steven A. Cook argues that the Turkish Republic's construction of a unified national identity, contributes to a conflict between Turkish and minority conceptions of national belonging. Cook characterizes the early Republican nation-building project as the creation of an exclusionary ethnonational state from the multiethnic Ottoman Empire.

Political theorist Çıdam identifies the slogan's use by the Turkish military as an instrument of intimidation and internal colonial domination, in minority-majority areas during the 1990s. According to Çıdam, massive inscriptions of the motto were installed by military authorities on hillsides surrounding minority regions in Eastern Anatolia as visible expressions of state power.

The motto has additionally appeared in incidents of xenophobia and anti-refugee violence. Sociologist Körükmez documents its use during the July 2024 attacks on refugees and their property in Kayseri, when crowds chanted the slogan alongside demands for refugees to leave Turkey. Körükmez situates these incidents within a longer history of racism directed against non-Muslim minorities, arguing that anti-refugee hostility represents a newer manifestation of what she terms "xeno-racism" in Turkish society.

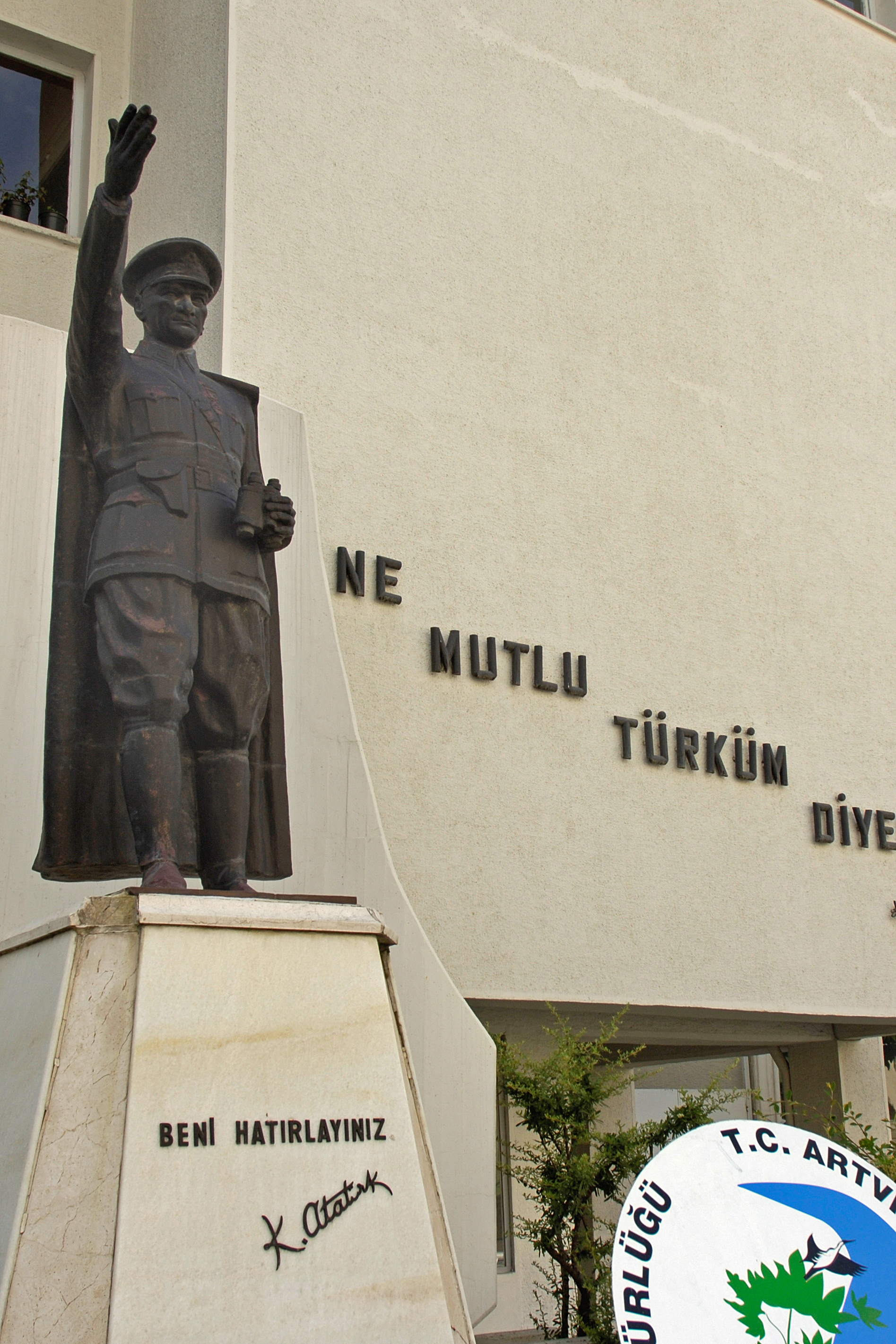
Atatürk monument in Artvin, captured during the 1921 Turkish invasion of Georgia. On the wall, it says: "How happy is the one who says I am a Turk."

=== Northern Cyprus ===
The motto has also attracted criticism in the context of the Cyprus problem and the Turkish military occupation of Northern Cyprus. A large inscription of Ne mutlu Türküm diyene accompanies the Turkish and Northern Cypriot flags on the Kyrenia Mountains (Pentadaktylos), facing the Greek Cypriot-controlled part of the island. In a written question submitted to the European Commission in 2009, Member of the European Parliament Antigoni Papadopoulou characterized the mountainside display as a provocation against Greek Cypriots, a reminder of the 1974 Turkish invasion and subsequent occupation, and part of efforts to reinforce Turkish control over northern Cypriot territory.

Researcher Laura Nicole Brody interprets the mountainside inscription as a form of territorial marking intended for a Greek Cypriot audience. Brody argues that the display communicates the permanence of Turkish occupation and implies the superiority of Turkish over Greek national identity. She places the slogan within a wider pattern of competing ethnonational symbols that reinforce the island's territorial and communal divisions.

Cypriot journalist Hadjidemetriou similarly describes the illuminated slogan and flags as symbols of territorial dispossession and the perceived permanence of the island's division. She argues that their prominence can evoke anger, defeat, and a sense of irreversible loss among Greek Cypriots, interpreting them as assertions that the pre-1974 situation cannot be restored.

== See also ==
- Peace at home, peace in the world, another unofficial motto of the Republic of Turkey.
