= Student Oath =

Daily morning oath in schools

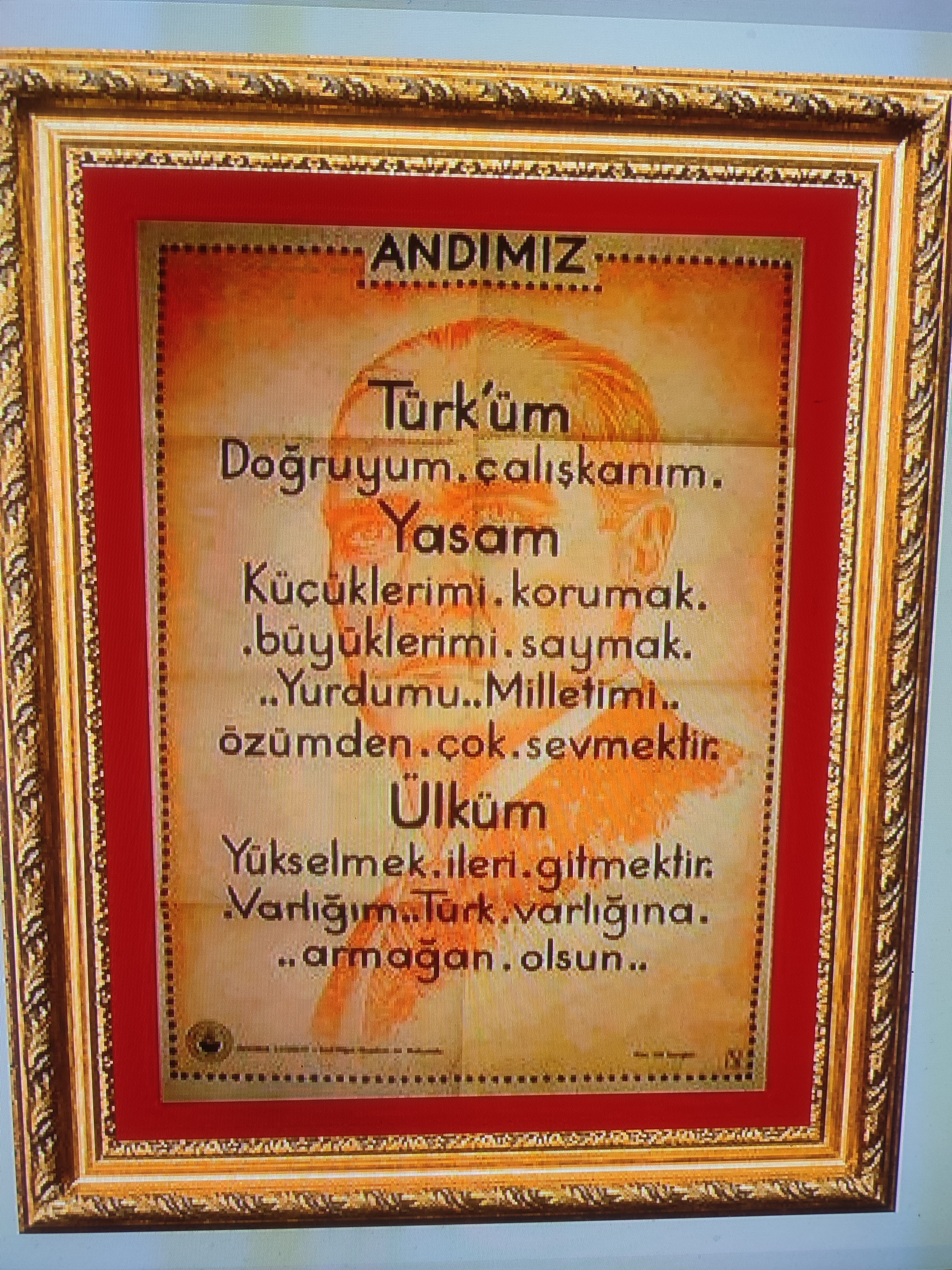
Students Oath text framed on the wall

The Student Oath or Student Pledge (Turkish: Öğrenci Andı) is the oath that was recited in school at the beginning of every school day. It was used until 2013, among other things, in primary schools in Turkey. After the regular morning singing the national anthem İstiklâl Marşı before class, the oath was led by a student, or a group of 2–5 students and repeated by all other students.

== History of the Student Oath ==
=== 1933 ===
==== Children's Day ====
According to Afet İnan's book, Reşit Galip who was the Minister of National Education at the time, composed the text of the "Student Oath" (or "Student Pledge", Turkish: Öğrenci Andı) on April 23, 1933 (Children's Day) The Board of Education and Edification of the Ministry of National Education introduced this text as the "Student Oath", with the direction number 101 and dated May 10, 1933. In accordance with the direction of the Board of Education and Edification, the Ministry of National Education issued the circular number 1749/42 and dated May 18, 1933 about the "Student Pledge". Students must repeat the oath each day.

==== Reşit Galip's original text ====
Türküm, doğruyum, çalışkanım. Yasam; küçüklerimi korumak, büyüklerimi saymak, yurdumu, milletimi özümden çok sevmektir. Ülküm; yükselmek, ileri gitmektir. Varlığım Türk varlığına armağan olsun.

I am Turkish (a Turk), I am truthful, I am hardworking. My Law: is to protect my juniors, respect my elders, to love my country, my nation more than myself. My ideal; is to rise, to progress. Let my existence be a gift dedicated to Turkish existence.

==== 10th Anniversary of the Republic ====
Mustafa Kemal (Atatürk) used the phrase "Ne mutlu Türküm diyene" (How happy is the one who says I am a Turk) in his speech delivered for the 10th anniversary of the Republic of Turkey, on October 29, 1933 (Republic Day)

=== 1972 ===
==== 50th Anniversary of the Battle of Dumlupınar ====
In preparation for the August 30th 50th Anniversary of the battle against Greek forces at Dumlupınar in 1922, the Student Oath was revised, and included as its last phrase "Ne mutlu Türküm diyene" (How happy is the one who says "I am a Turk") from the 1933 speech. The regulation to do this (article 78 for elementary schools) was published in the Resmî Gazete No. 14291 on August 29, 1972.

==== Text of 1972 edition ====
Turkish:

Türküm, doğruyum, çalışkanım. Yasam, küçüklerimi korumak, büyüklerimi saymak, yurdumu, milletimi özümden çok sevmektir. Ülküm yükselmek, ileri gitmektir. Varlığım Türk varlığına armağan olsun.

Ey bu günümüzü sağlayan, Ulu Atatürk; açtığın yolda, kurduğun ülküde, gösterdiğin amaçta hiç durmadan yürüyeceğime ant içerim.

Ne mutlu Türküm diyene.

English:

I am Turkish, honest and hardworking. My principle is to protect the younger, to respect the elder, to love my homeland and my nation more than myself. My ideal is to rise, to progress. My existence shall be dedicated to the Turkish existence.

O Great Atatürk, who had created our life of today; on the path that you have paved, in the country that you established, I swear to walk incessantly with the purposes that you have set.

How happy is the one who says "I am Turkish."

=== 1997 ===
==== Text of 1997 edition ====
Turkish:

Türküm, doğruyum, çalışkanım. İlkem, küçüklerimi korumak, büyüklerimi saymak, yurdumu, milletimi, özümden çok sevmektir. Ülküm, yükselmek, ileri gitmektir.

Ey büyük Atatürk! Açtığın yolda, gösterdiğin hedefe durmadan yürüyeceğime ant içerim.

Varlığım Türk varlığına armağan olsun. Ne mutlu Türküm diyene !

English :

I am Turkish, I am honest, I am hardworking. My principle is to protect my juniors, to respect my elders, to love my homeland and my nation more than myself. My ideal is to rise, to progress.

O Great Atatürk! I vow to walk ever upon the path you paved towards the aim you have set.

Let my existence be gifted to Turkish existence. How happy is the one who says "I am a Turk!".

=== 2013 ===
==== Annulment ====
On 8 September 2013, the Official Gazette announced that the practice of reciting the Student Oath was abolished.

This move was part of the controversial “Democratization Package” introduced by the Justice and Development Party (AKP) which had anti-discriminatory policy changes to aid the peace process. Kurdish politicians criticized the changes as insufficient, while some viewed them, particularly the lifting of the ban on headscarves in parliament, as going against the nationalist and secular Constitution of Turkey.

However, many welcomed the repeal of the oath because it was seen as exclusionary to Turkey's minorities.

=== 2018 ===
==== Reinstation ====
In October 2018, the Council of State, the highest administrative court, decided that the Student Oath had been a well-established practice and that the justification for removing it in 2013 by the AKP had been insufficient.

The decision came after legal action by Turkey's Education and Science Worker's Union (Türk Eğitim-Sen). Many opponents of the AKP considered banning the oath to be against the secularist policies of Turkish Republic founder Mustafa Kemal Atatürk.

When the ruling was announced, Türk Eğitim-Sen Chairperson Talip Geylan made a statement that the oath's focus on Turkish identity was not racist, saying the renewed use of the Student Oath would be a "reward" for patriotic schoolchildren.

=== 2021 ===
==== Re-annulment ====
On 4 March 2021, the high chamber of the Council of State agreed with the appeal demand from the Ministry of Education and abolished the recitation of the Student Oath again.

The decision restarted the controversy about the recitation. Devlet Bahçeli, the leader of the Nationalist Movement Party, criticized the decision and compared it to a pin-pulled bomb. Kemal Kılıçdaroğlu and Meral Akşener, leaders of the Republican People's Party and Good Party, blamed Bahçeli for hypocrisy due to his support for the AKP government. Meanwhile, the President and the leader of the AKP, Recep Tayyip Erdoğan, expressed his support for the decision implicitly and said, "National Anthem is our National Oath."

== See also ==
- Pledge of Allegiance of the United States
