= Constitution of Northern Cyprus =

Fundamental law of the Turkish Republic of Northern Cyprus

The Constitution of the Turkish Republic of Northern Cyprus (Turkish: Kuzey Kıbrıs Türk Cumhuriyeti Anayasası) was prepared by the Constituent Assembly of Northern Cyprus after the declaration of independence on 15 November 1983, and was approved by the Turkish Cypriot electorate in a referendum on 5 May 1985 with a majority of 70.2% in favour. The constitution is similar to the 1975 Constitution of the Turkish Federated State of Cyprus, but had a number of new provisions regulating the needs of the new Republic. It has 164 articles and 13 transitional articles.

The constitution envisages a parliamentary democracy. Sovereignty is vested in the people comprising the citizens of Northern Cyprus and is exercised by authorized organs in the name of the people. No organ or authority can exercise any State authority which does not emanate from the constitution. Article 7 provides for the supremacy of the constitution.

== Rights and liberties ==
The constitution contains elaborate provisions guaranteeing basic rights and liberties. Examples of these rights are: the right to equality, the right to life and corporal integrity, the right to liberty and security of a person, the right of access to the court and the right to a fair and public hearing within a reasonable time by independent and impartial courts, and rights of convicted persons. Other articles contain a number of economic and social rights. Torture is prohibited. The right to privacy of life, inviolability of the dwelling house, confidentiality of correspondence, the right to free movement and residence, freedom of science and art, freedom of the press, and freedom of assembly and association are also secured by provisions which reflect the democratic characteristics of the State.

== Comparing the two constitutions ==
In comparison with the 1975 Constitution, the 1985 Constitution contains more detailed provisions to protect fundamental human rights and freedoms. For instance, capital punishment for premeditated murder, provided for under the Criminal Code, is abolished by transitional Article 13. Article 15 declared that capital punishment can be imposed only by law in cases of treason during wartime, acts of terrorism and piracy jure gentium, and for repeated murders. Even in these instances no execution of capital punishment can be carried out unless the Legislative Assembly decides so under the provisions of Article 78.

== Economic and social rights ==
New economic and social rights have also been formulated, such as the right to protection from hunger, protection of the unemployed and needy, protection of the consumer, and the development of sports. There are elaborate provisions as to citizenship which also preserve acquired rights.

Restrictions and limitations which may be imposed by law on the exercise of these rights and liberties are set out specifically in each article. Such restrictions can, generally speaking, be imposed by law for purposes of national security, protection of the rights of others, and for the maintenance of democratic institutions.
