= Mount Selvili =

Highest peak of Northern Cyprus

Kyparissovouno
- Selvili Tepe; Kyparissovouno
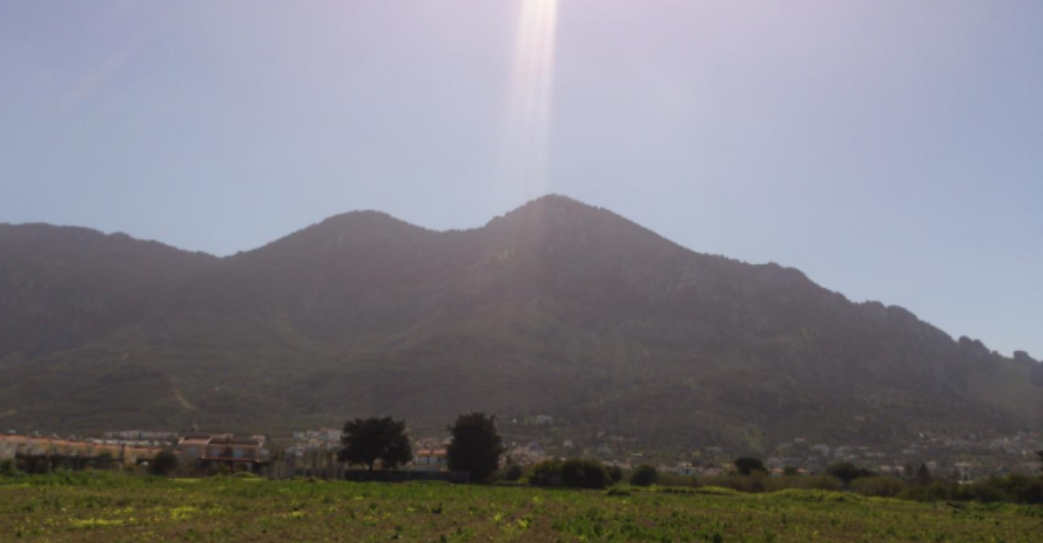

Highest point
- Elevation: 1,024 m (3,360 ft)
- Prominence: 834 m (2,736 ft)
- Isolation: 38.51 km (23.93 mi)
- Listing: Country high point
- Coordinates: 35°19′10″N 33°9′41″E

Naming
- Native name: Κυπαρισσόβουνο (Greek)

Geography
- Location within Cyprus
- Location: De jure Cyprus; De facto Northern Cyprus
- District: Kyrenia District
- Parent range: Kyrenia Mountains

Kyparissovouno (Greek: Κυπαρισσόβουνο, romanized: Kyparissovouno, Turkish: Selvili Tepe) is the highest peak of the unrecognised Turkish Republic of Northern Cyprus at an altitude of 1,024 metres (3,360 ft), situated in the Kyrenia Mountains. It is located in the Kyrenia District.
