= Kyrenia Mountains =

Mountain range in Cyprus

Coordinates: 35.283°N 33.534°E

Topographic map with the Kyrenia/Pentadactylos range labelled

The Kyrenia Mountains (Greek: Κερύνειο Όρος; Turkish: Girne Dağları) are a long, narrow mountain range that runs for approximately 160 km (100 mi) along the northern coast of the island of Cyprus. It is primarily made of hard crystalline limestone, with some marble. Its highest peak is Mount Selvili, at 1,024 m (3,360 ft). Pentadaktylos (also spelled Pentadactylos; Greek: Πενταδάκτυλος; Turkish: Beşparmak) is another name for the Kyrenia Mountains, though Britannica refers to Pentadaktylos as the "western portion" of the latter, or the part west of Melounta. Pentadaktylos (lit. "five-fingered") is so-named after one of its most distinguishing features, a peak that resembles five fingers.

The Kyrenia mountains are named after the Kyrenia mountains in Achaia, Greece, which are well known from mythology because of the connection with one of the 12 labours of Hercules, the capture of the Kerynitis deer that lived there. This sacred deer of Artemis with golden horns and bronze legs ran so fast that no one could reach it. Hercules, however, after pursuing it for a whole year, managed to catch it and transport it alive to Mycenae.

A devastating fire in July 1995 burned large portions of the Kyrenia Mountains, resulting in the loss of significant forest land and natural habitat.

The only other mountain range in Cyprus is the Troodos Mountains.

== Geology ==
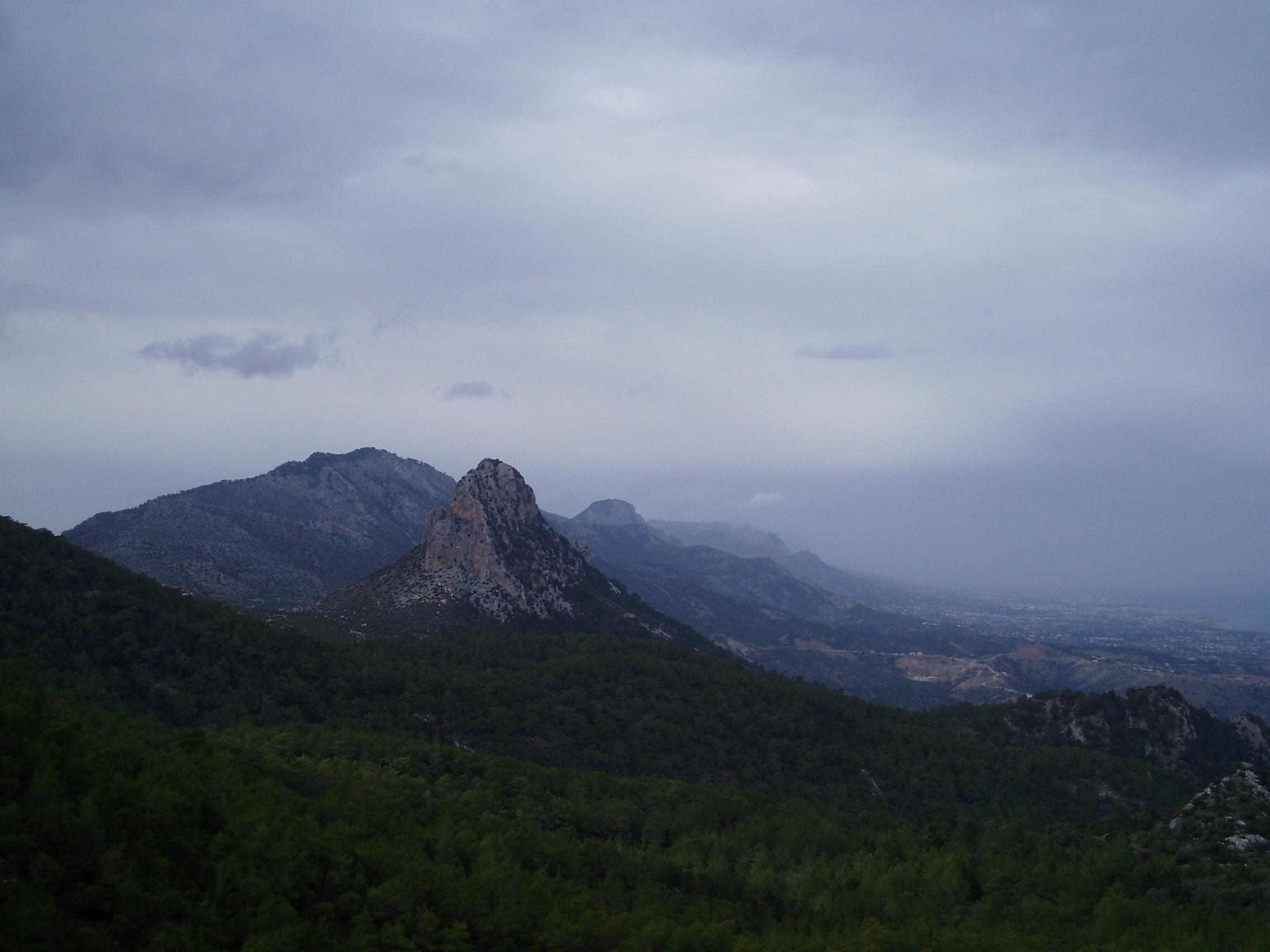
The Kyrenia Mountains

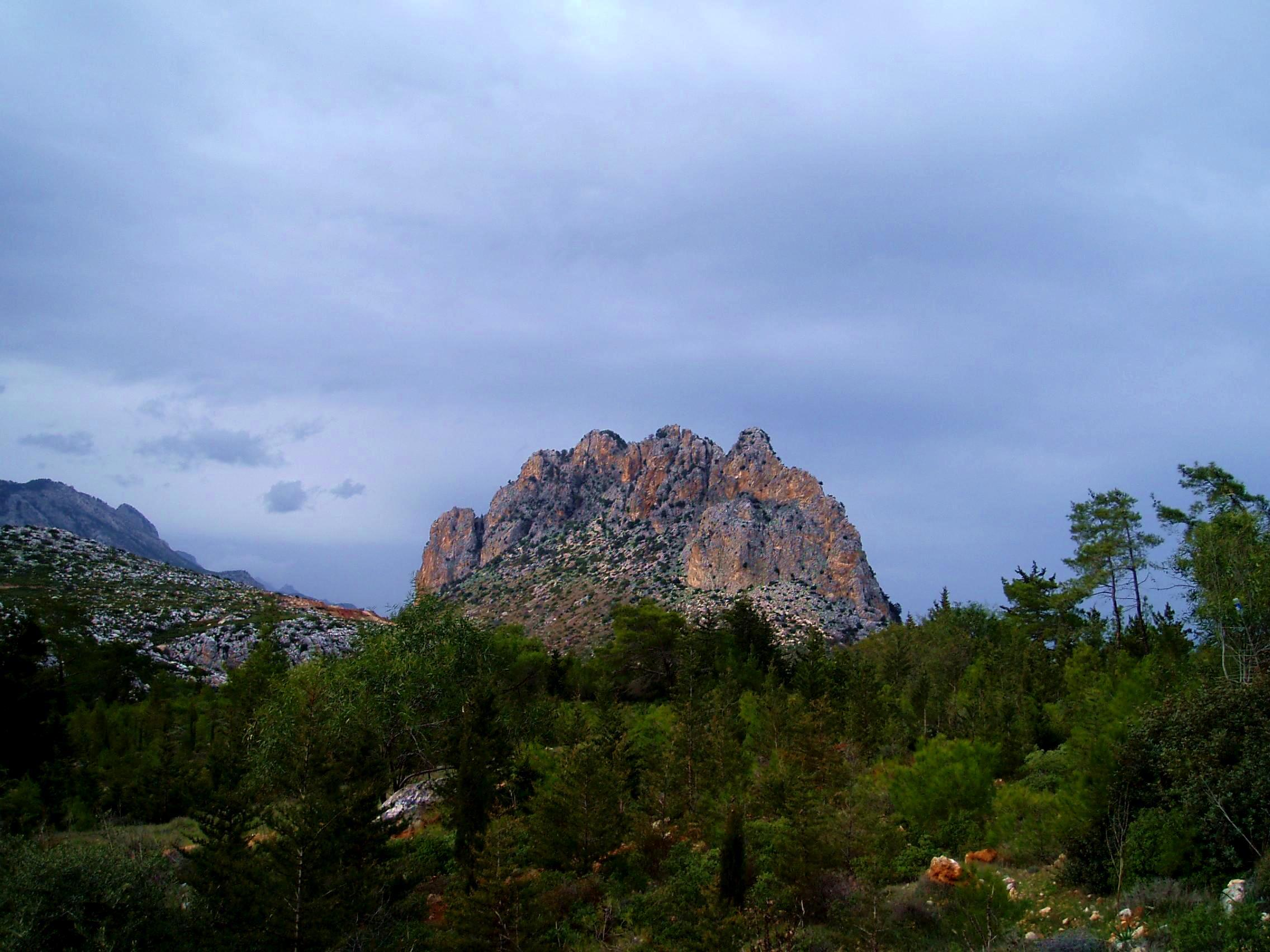
The "Pentadaktylos" peak

These mountains are a series of sedimentary formations from the Permian to the Middle Miocene pushed up by a collision of the African and Eurasian plates. Though only half the height of the Troodos Mountains, the Kyrenia Mountains are rugged and rise abruptly from the Mesaoria plain.

== History ==
The location of the mountains near the sea made them desirable locations for watch towers and castles overlooking the northern Cyprus coast, as well as the central plain. These castles generally date from the 10th through the 15th centuries, primarily constructed by the Byzantines and Lusignans. The castles of St. Hilarion, Buffavento, and Kantara sit astride peaks and were of strategic importance during much of the history of Cyprus during the Middle Ages.

== Painted flag ==
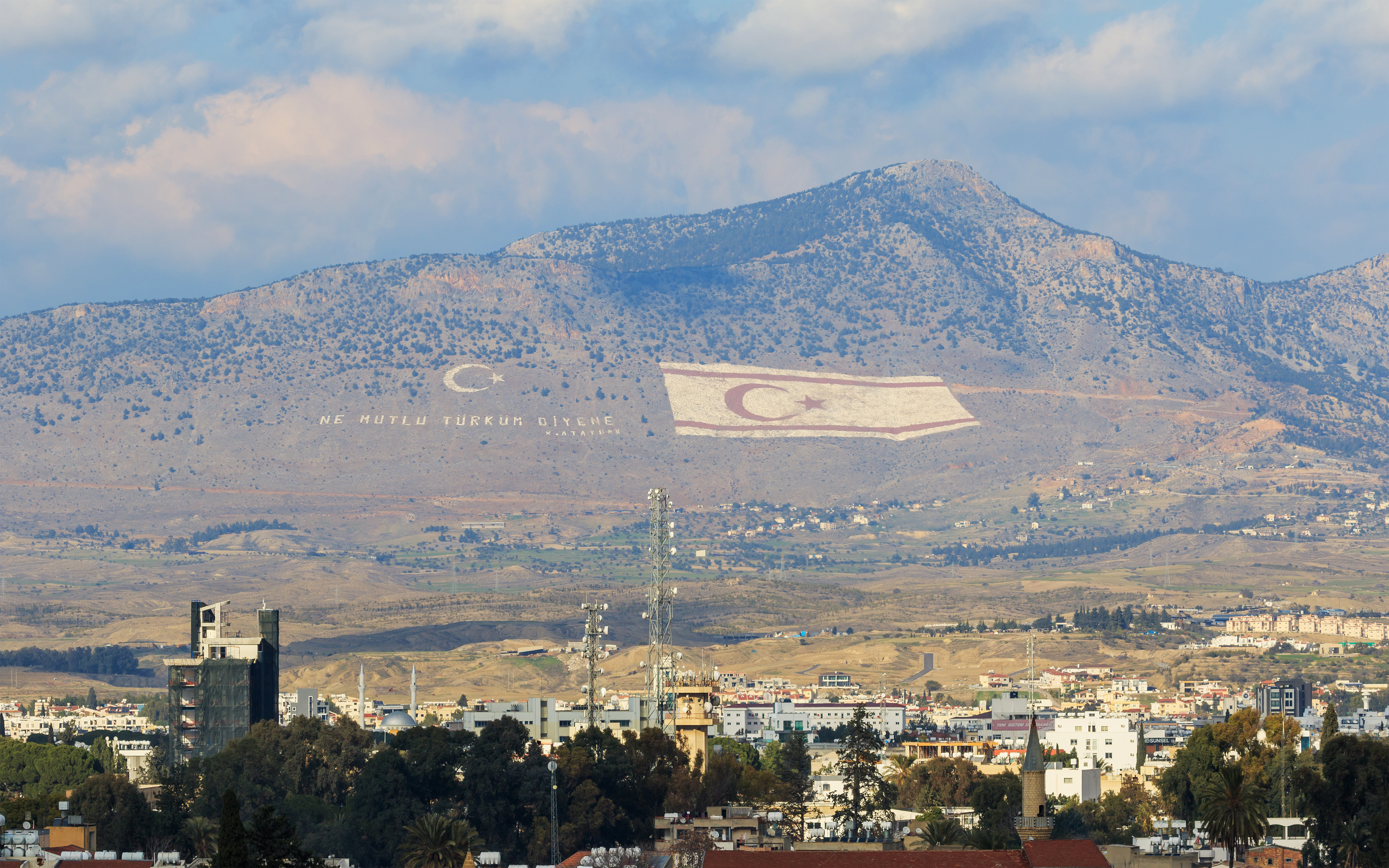
The flag of Northern Cyprus on the mountainside

A flag of Northern Cyprus is painted on the southern slope of the Kyrenia Mountains. It is reportedly 425 metres wide and 250 metres high, and is illuminated at night.

The flag is considered controversial as evidenced in the Parliamentary Question put to the European Parliament by Antigoni Papadopoulou on 22 October 2009, "How can it permit the existence of such a flag which, apart from the catastrophic environmental damage it causes, the use of chemical substances and the brutal abuse of the environment, involves an absurd waste of electricity at a time of economic crisis? Does Turkey show sufficient respect towards the environment to justify its desire to open the relevant chapter of accession negotiations?"

== Legends ==
There are many legends about the Pentadactylos mountains. One tells the story of a conceited villager who fell in love with the local queen and asked for her hand in marriage. The queen wished to be rid of the impertinent young man and requested that he bring her some water from the spring of Apostolos Andreas monastery in the Karpas, a perilous journey in those days. The man set off and after several weeks returned with a skin full of that precious water. The queen was most dismayed to see that he had succeeded, but still refused to marry him. In a fit of rage, he poured the water on to the earth, seized a handful of the resulting mud and threw it at the queens head. She ducked and the lump of mud sailed far across the plain to land on top of the Kyrenia mountain range, where it is to this day, still showing the impression of the thwarted villager’s five fingers.

Another famous one is of the Byzantine hero Digenis Akritas. Tradition has it that Digenis Akritas's hand gripped the mountain to get out of the sea when he came to free Cyprus from its Saracen invaders, and this is his handprint. He also threw a large rock across Cyprus to get at the Saracen ships. That rock landed in Paphos at the site of the birthplace of Aphrodite, thus known to this day as Petra Tou Romiou or "Rock of the Greek".
