= Swedish Cyprus Expedition =

Archaeological expedition

The Swedish Cyprus Expedition
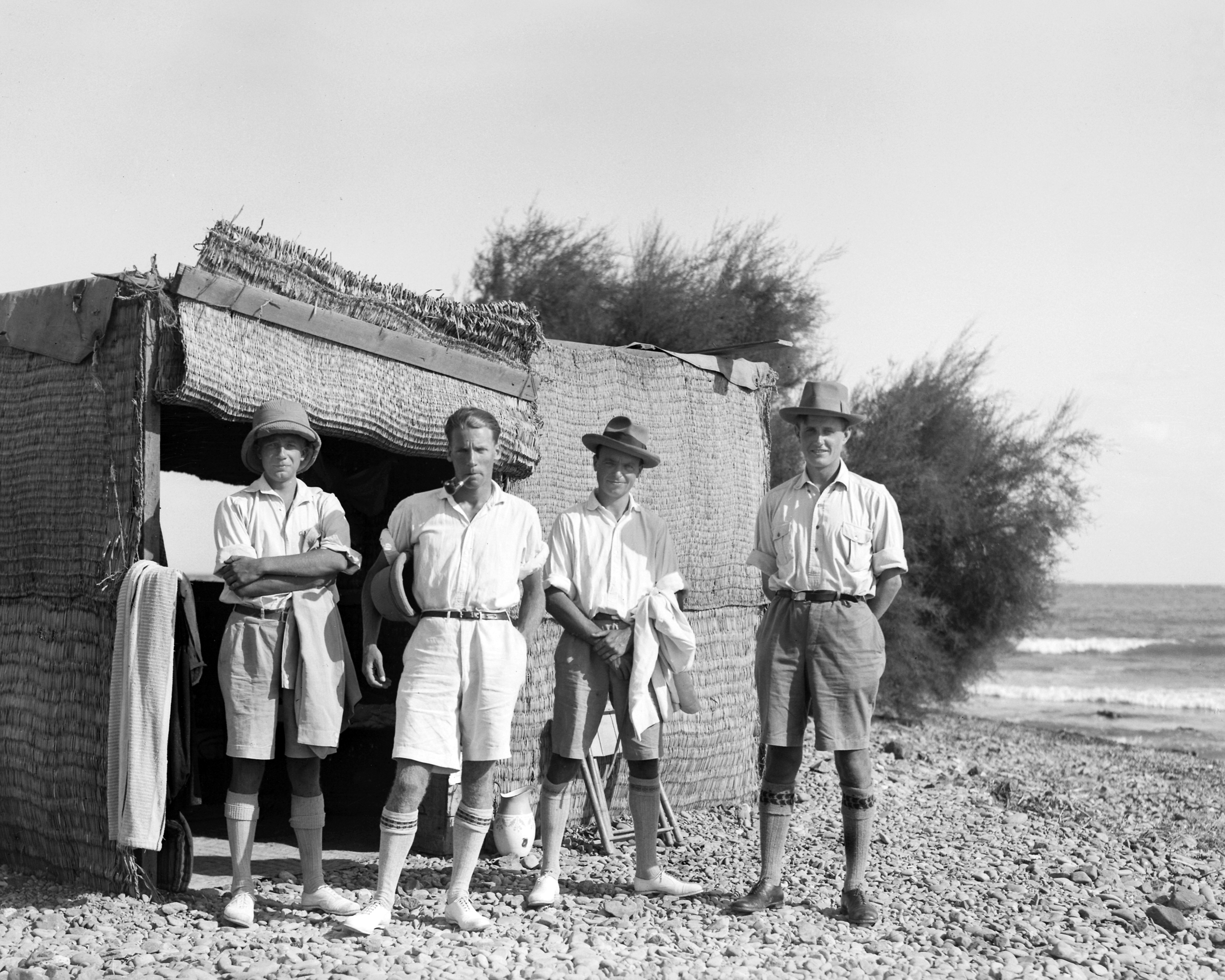
- From the left: John Lindros, Alfred Westholm, Erik Sjöqvist och Einar Gjerstad. Mersinaki, 1930.
- Country: Sweden
- Leader: Einar Gjerstad
- Start: Cyprus; September 1927
- End: Sweden; March 1931
- Goal: To obtain more knowledge of living areas, temples, and graves from the Stone Age to the Roman times on Cyprus
- Crew: Alfred Westholm, Erik Sjöqvist and John Lindros
- Achievements: Mapped Cyprus' ancient history; Concluded that the distinctive culture of early Cyprus had been created in close contact with various cultures from the Middle East and the western Mediterranean areas.

The Swedish Cyprus Expedition was assembled to systematically investigate Cyprus’s early archaeological history. The expedition occurred between September 1927 and March 1931 and was led by the three archaeologists Einar Gjerstad, Erik Sjöqvist and Alfred Westholm together with the architect John Lindros who photographed during their time in Cyprus. The excavation constitutes the foundation of modern archaeology in Cyprus. The results of the excavations revealed that the distinctive culture of early Cyprus had been created in close contact with various cultures from the Middle East and the western Mediterranean areas.

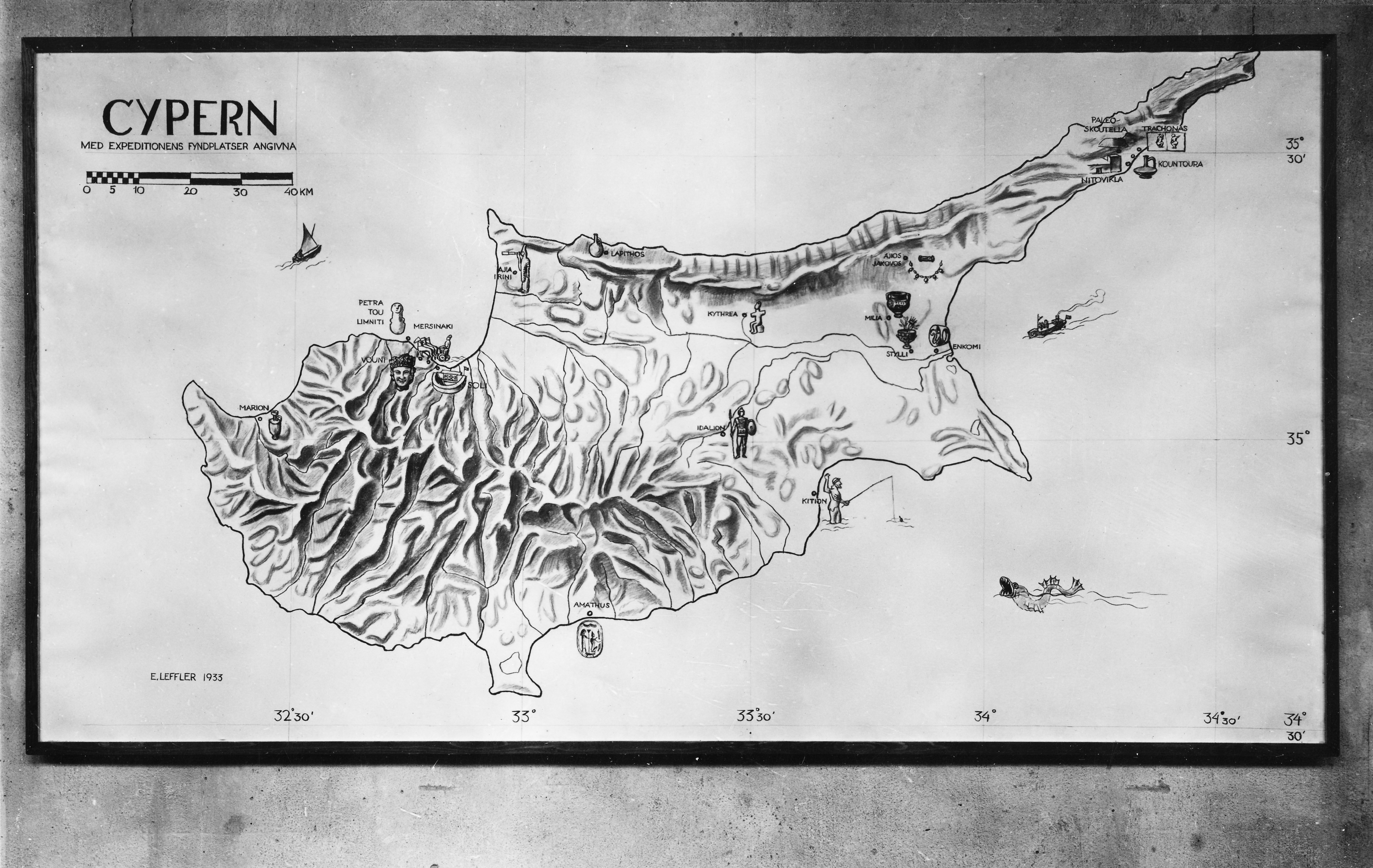
Map with the excavation sites in Cyprus. The picture is from an exhibition at Liljevalch's art gallery.

Through careful archaeological excavations around the whole island of Cyprus, the Swedish Cyprus Expedition mapped Cyprus's history from the Stone Age to the end of the Roman period. Archaeological excavations were made at various locations in Cyprus including Lapithos, Nitovikla, Agia Eirini, Marion, Idalion, Amathus, and Enkomi. They investigated around 25 sites all over the island during the short time of four years. The results were published in four volumes. Most of the archaeological materials are now kept at the Cyprus Museum in Nicosia and Medelhavsmuseet in Stockholm.

The goal of the excavation was to obtain more knowledge of how people lived, their religious practices as well as burial practices during the Stone Age until the Roman period. Therefore they excavated settlements, temples, graves, forts, a palace complex, and a Roman theatre. Additionally, they investigated Cyprus’s neolithic living areas which were previously unknown. Because the Swedish archaeologists were very inspired by Oscar Montelius, they worked systematically both during the excavations and publications. Einar Gjerstad applied Montelius' classification when he divided Cypriot pottery from the Bronze and Iron Ages into the phases "early", "middle" and "late". These divisions are still widely accepted. Montelius' extensive use of "closed contexts" to establish typological sequences lies behind the Swedish Cyprus Expedition's methods and results. To be able to create a chronology and a typology of the archaeological material they dug out close to 375 graves from different periods. Among other things, the graves contained around 10,000 ceramic vases. At religious places such as the places of worship and temple areas, they found thousands of sculptures made of stone and terracotta.

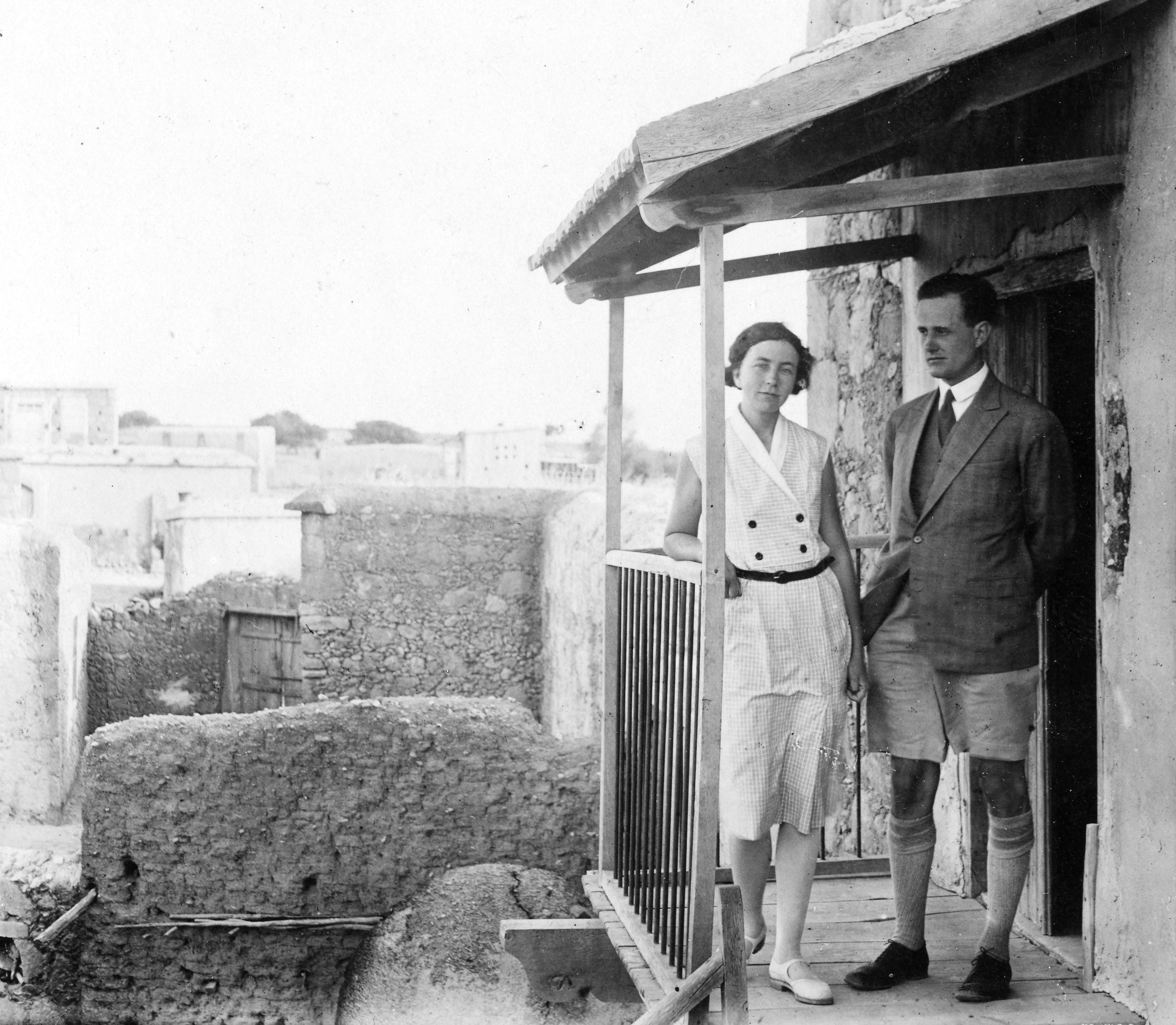
Einar and Vivi Gjerstad at Agia Eirini.

The Swedish archaeologist’s families came along to Cyprus, therefore Rosa Lindros, Vivi Gjerstad and her children as well as their nanny Gudrun Atterman can be seen in the pictures from the excavation. The expedition’s chauffeur Toulis Souidos was a Cypriot man who helped with various things during the expedition, such as conservation work, for example. Later he followed the expedition back to Sweden where he continued to work with the Cyprus collections. Furthermore, the expedition could never have happened without all the other men and women who worked at the excavations.

== Background ==
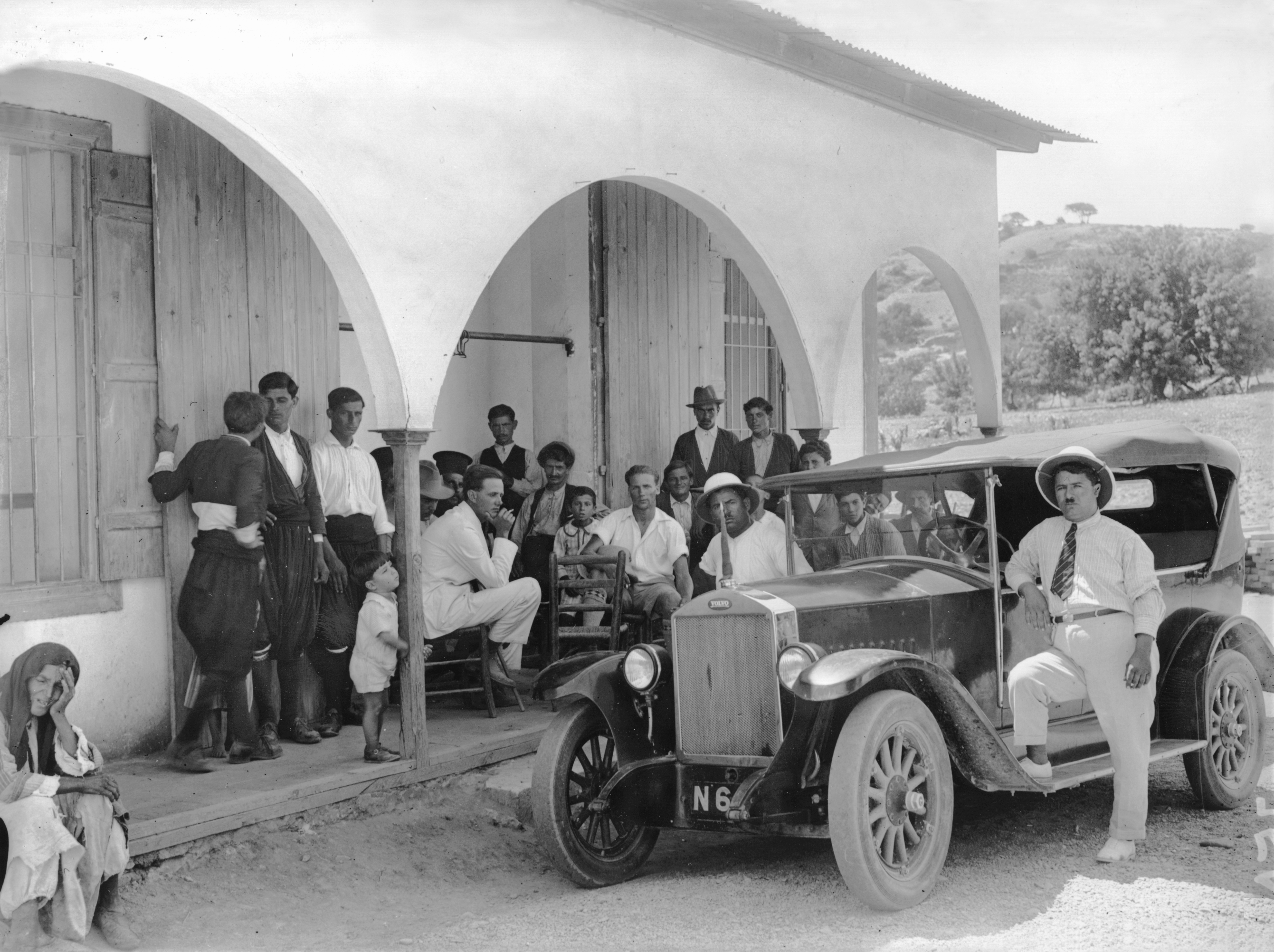
Toulis Souidos next to the Volvo. At the café Pyrgos.

Before the excavation, Einar Gjerstad had visited Cyprus during the years 1923 and 1924 to make preliminary archaeological investigations which resulted in his thesis, Studies on Prehistoric Cyprus, 1926. The next year, 1927, Gjerstad proposed a more detailed project with Cyprus as the survey area. On Gjerstad's initiative, the Swedish Cyprus Committee was established the same year with the intention to organize an archaeological expedition and support the excavation economically. The committee consisted of the Swedish crown prince Gustaf VI Adolf as chairman, Sigurd Curman as secretary, Johannes Hellner as treasurer, and Martin P. Nilsson as well as Axel W. Persson. Einar Gjerstad was appointed as project manager and John Lindros, Erik Sjöqvist, and Alfred Westholm were appointed as assistants. Gjerstad was responsible for the organization of the expedition and Sjöqvist and Westholm were responsible for the archaeological fieldwork. Lindros was responsible for the drawings and photographs. With Gustaf VI Adolf as chairman, the opportunities to collect financial resources from private donors and patrons increased due to his royal status. The financing largely occurred through private donors and Gjerstad managed to get contributions from the financier Ivar Kreuger, among others. Einar Gjerstad borrowed one of the first manufactured Volvo cars, Volvo ÖV 4. The car was probably number three in the series called Jacob and was delivered to Cyprus year 1927. It was reported that the car worked well and could drive on the bumpy donkey trails at 60 km/h.

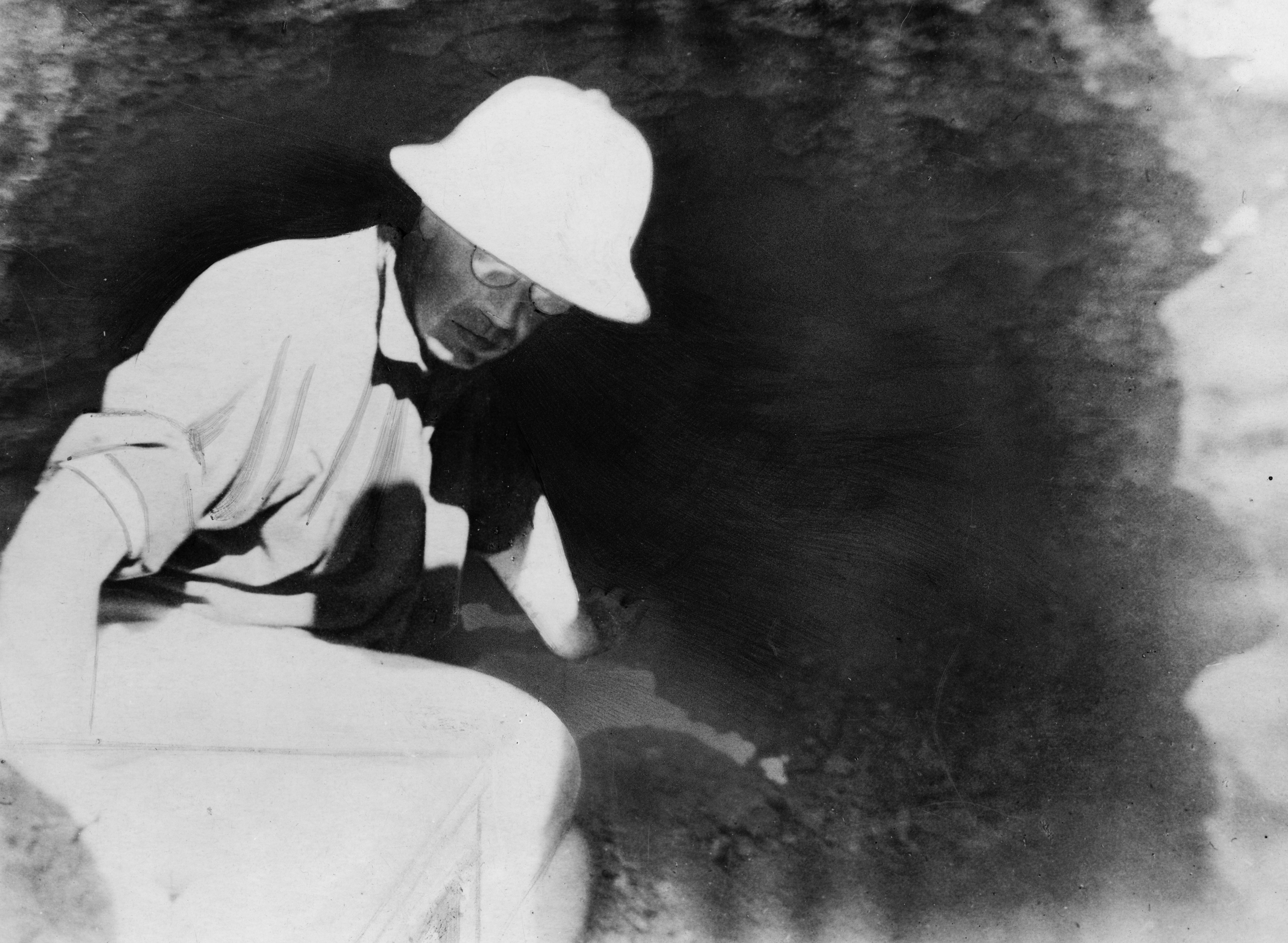
Gustaf VI Adolf at the excavation of Stylli. 1930.

Cyprus was under British rule since 1878 and become a so-called crown colony in 1925. The foreign minister Sir Ronald Storrs was installed as governor in 1926. The following year the Swedes came to the island. Excavations were part of Storr's tourism strategy to fill the archaeological museum in Nicosia, which was designed by a British architect. In this context, Gustaf VI Adolf's prestige and influence as crown prince played an important role. It would probably have been difficult to get permission for the large-scale excavations in Cyprus without him.

== The distribution of the finds ==
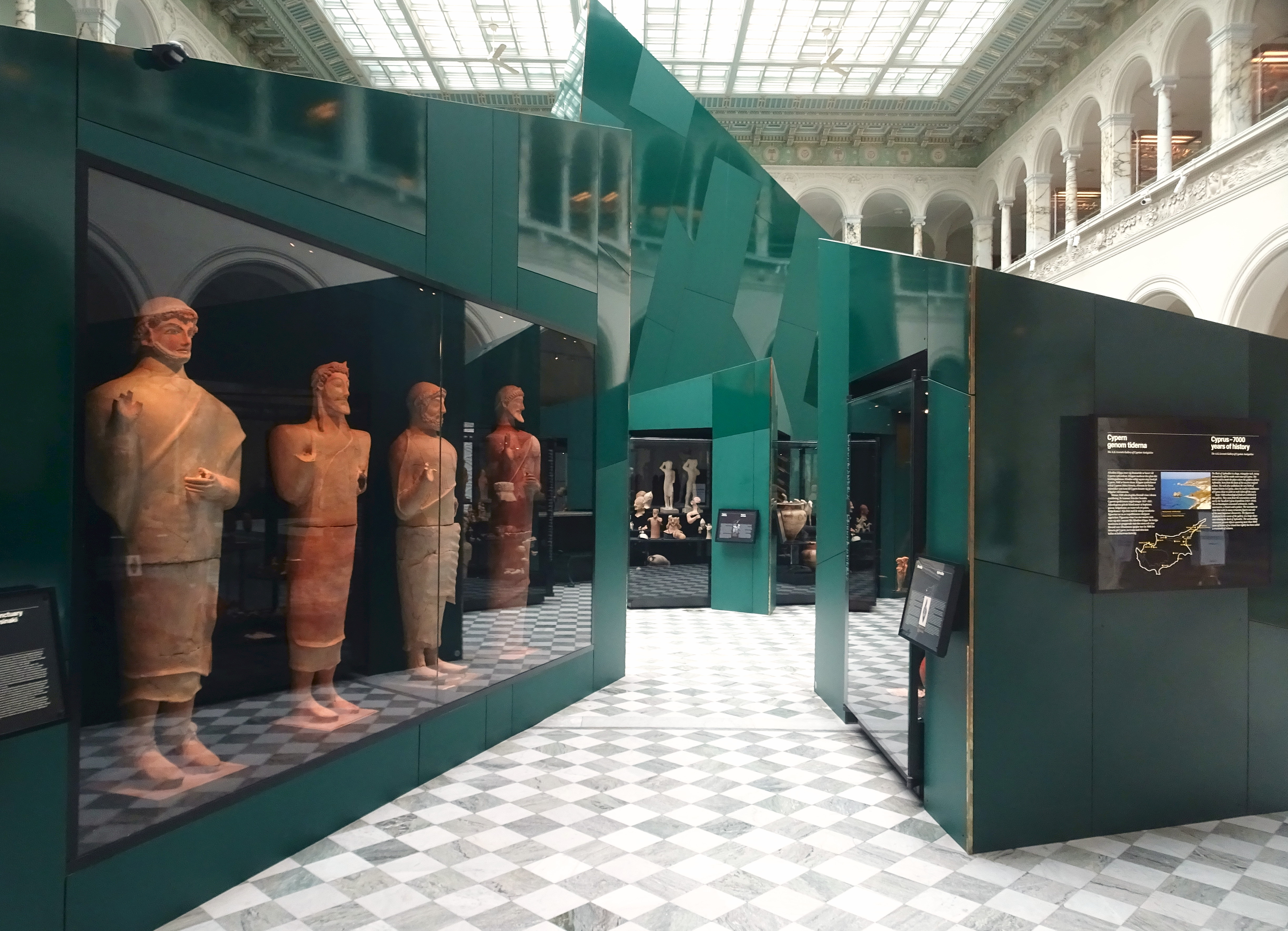
Medelhavsmuseet (The Museum of Mediterranean and Near Eastern Antiquities) The exhibition Cypern genom tiderna. The bearded terracotta sculptures which the expedition found at the sanctuary at Mersinaki.

In March 1931 the archaeologists and their families returned to Sweden with the objects from Cyprus. According to the legislation at the time they divided the findings between Cyprus and Sweden. When the final negotiations regarding the archaeological material took place in October 1930, Gustaf Adolf visited Cyprus to personally lead the negotiations. Sweden acquired around 12,000 of the 18,000 objects and therefore more than half of the objects, which was otherwise the custom, probably thanks to Gustaf Adolf. The archaeological material was packed in 771 wooden boxes and brought to Sweden in March 1931. The objects from the Cyprus expedition created the base of Medelhavsmuseet’s collection when it opened in 1954 and are still on display in the museum's permanent exhibition. Furthermore, Medelhavsmuseet’s warehouses are today full of ceramics, sculptures, and metal objects made of bronze, silver, gold, copper, and Roman glass from the Cyprus expedition.

== The Publications ==
When the expedition returned to Sweden 1931, they could process and work with the material from Cyprus. In Stockholm they had the help of a lot of assistants such as Margit Hallberg for example, who worked with the archaeological materials in the freezing rooms of the historic museum at the Krubban quarter.

Margit Hallberg working. Several chapters of the Swedish Cyprus Expedition's publications were written with gloves on and warm boots tucked into straw shoes.

The expedition’s archaeological material was published a few years after their return to Stockholm. The first three volumes came out in 1934–1937 and then the fourth volume in 1948. The publication is dedicated to the ladies of the excavations in grateful recognition of much valuable assistance and collaboration. For example, Vivi Gjerstad rendered good service to the Expedition in various ways both during the excavations in Cyprus and during the preparation of the publication by proofs reading, etc. Margareta Sjöqvist monitored the registration work and assisted in the typing. Later, five further specialized studies were published, each of them treating a different period. They were created by Cypriot, British, and Swedish archaeologists. Few other archaeological expeditions have published their findings so quickly and thoroughly. To this day these publications are fundamental to all archaeological research centered around Cyprus. In addition to the archaeological material the expedition’s participants left behind plenty of letters, thousands of photographs, and several videos. The archival material provides a unique insight into daily life on the island and shows Cyprus at the crossroads between an old and a new world. At the same time, it testifies to the young men's enthusiasm and sincere love for Cyprus, its history and people. Most of the archaeological material are now kept at the Cyprus Museum in Nicosia and Medelhavsmuseet in Stockholm.

== Summaries of some of the excavation sites ==
=== Lapithos, the autumn 1927–spring 1928 ===
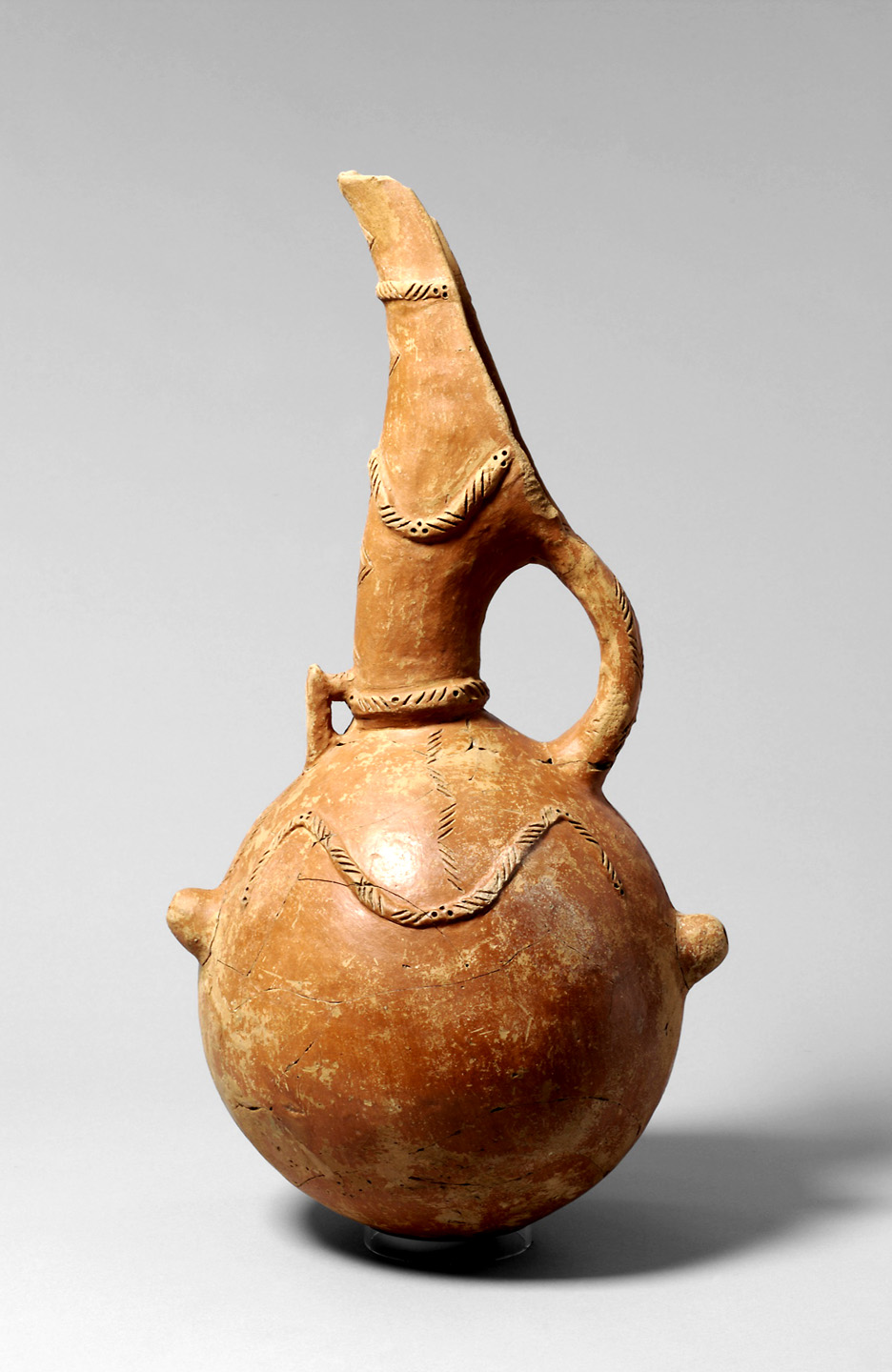
Beak-spouted jug of Red Polished ware. From Lapithos, Tomb 319B. Middle Cypriote I–II, ca. 1850–1775 B.C. This jug can be seen at the Medelhavsmuseet, Stockholm.

The village of Lapithos is located in the north of Cyprus. Close to Lapithos there is a big grave burial from the Bronze Age (ca. 2000–1800 BCE) with hundreds of graves. John Myres did an excavation here in 1913 and Menelaos Markides in 1917. Furthermore, grave diggers had looted the site multiple times before the Swedish archaeologist got there. The Swedish excavation at Lapithos from 1927–1928 resulted in a multitude of ceramics and weapons made of copper and bronze. They also found delicate proboscis jugs with elongated necks (beak spouted) and shiny red paint, which are similar to contemporary ceramics from Anatolia.

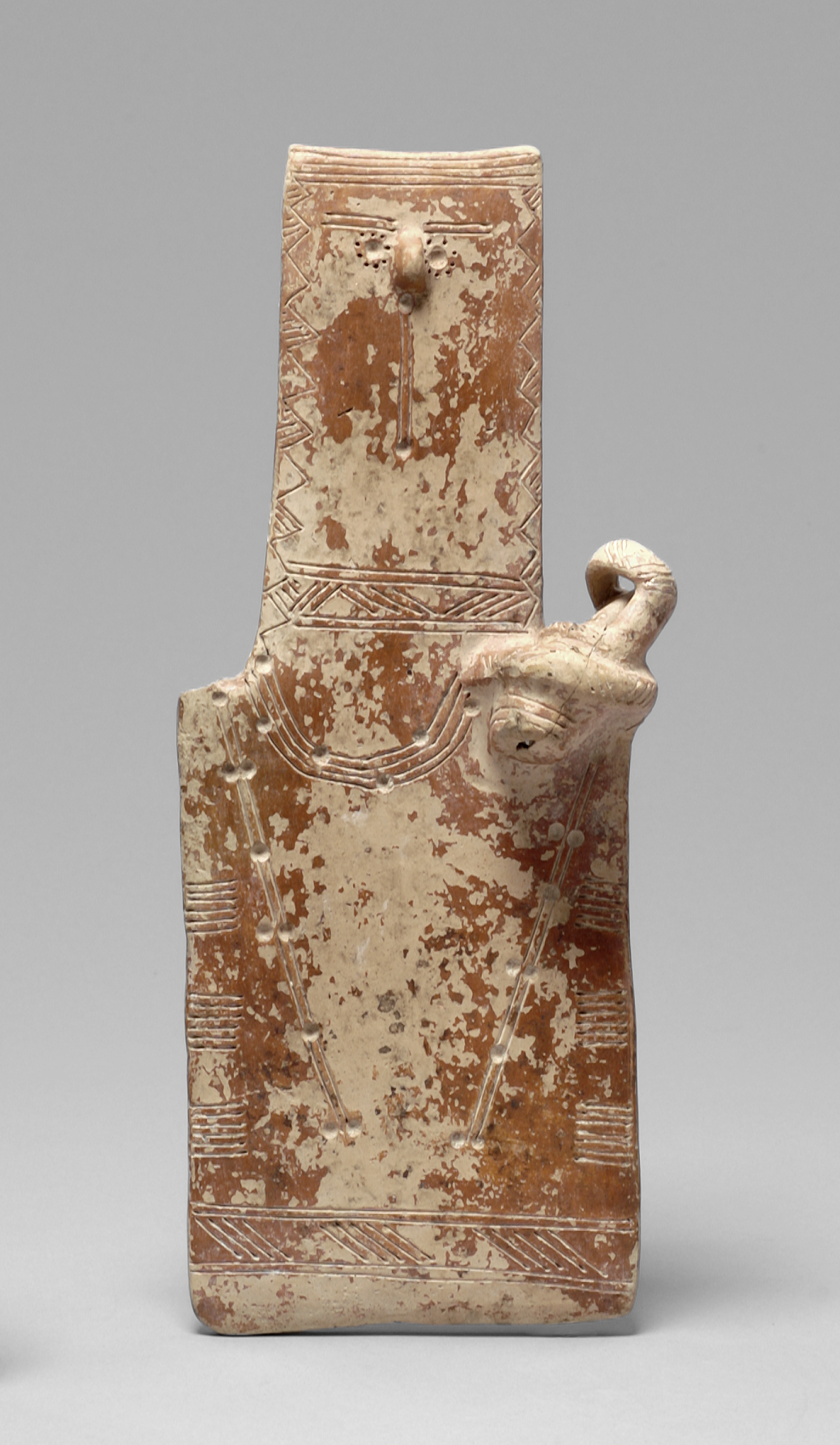
Red Polished plankshaped figurine of a mother holding a cradle with an infant inside. From Lapithos, Tomb 313A. Early Cypriote III – Middle Cypriote I, ca. 2000–1800 B.C. This figurine can be seen at Medelhavsmuseet, Stockholm.

The oldest settlement, dating from the Neolithic or Chalcolithic period, is located to the west of the village of Lapithos and is called Alonia ton Plakon. This place was damaged by humans and natural causes during the course of history, therefore, the area of the settlement are difficult to define. The eastern settlement’s preservation was deteriorated because of winter floods and Roman, Byzantine, and modern cultivation. Therefore, only a few remains of houses were found, such as some stone foundation walls, hearths and three bothroi cut into the rock. The site probably had four periods of habitations. After the site was abandoned, it was disturbed in the Geometric period when the place was used as a necropolis, therefore the archaeologists found tombs cut into the rock. During this period, they used stones from the foundations of the Neolithic houses as doors to the tombs. The western settlement contained remains of four huts. Three hearths were found here as well. The finds were mainly of three classes: objects of flint, stone and pottery. The brown coloured flint is very common. The stone objects are mostly axe heads, hammers and chisels. Most of the pottery belonged to these classes: red polished ware, plain white ware and painted ware. The settlements are dated to 3000 B.C. although the Eastern settlement should be dated a bit earlier than the western.

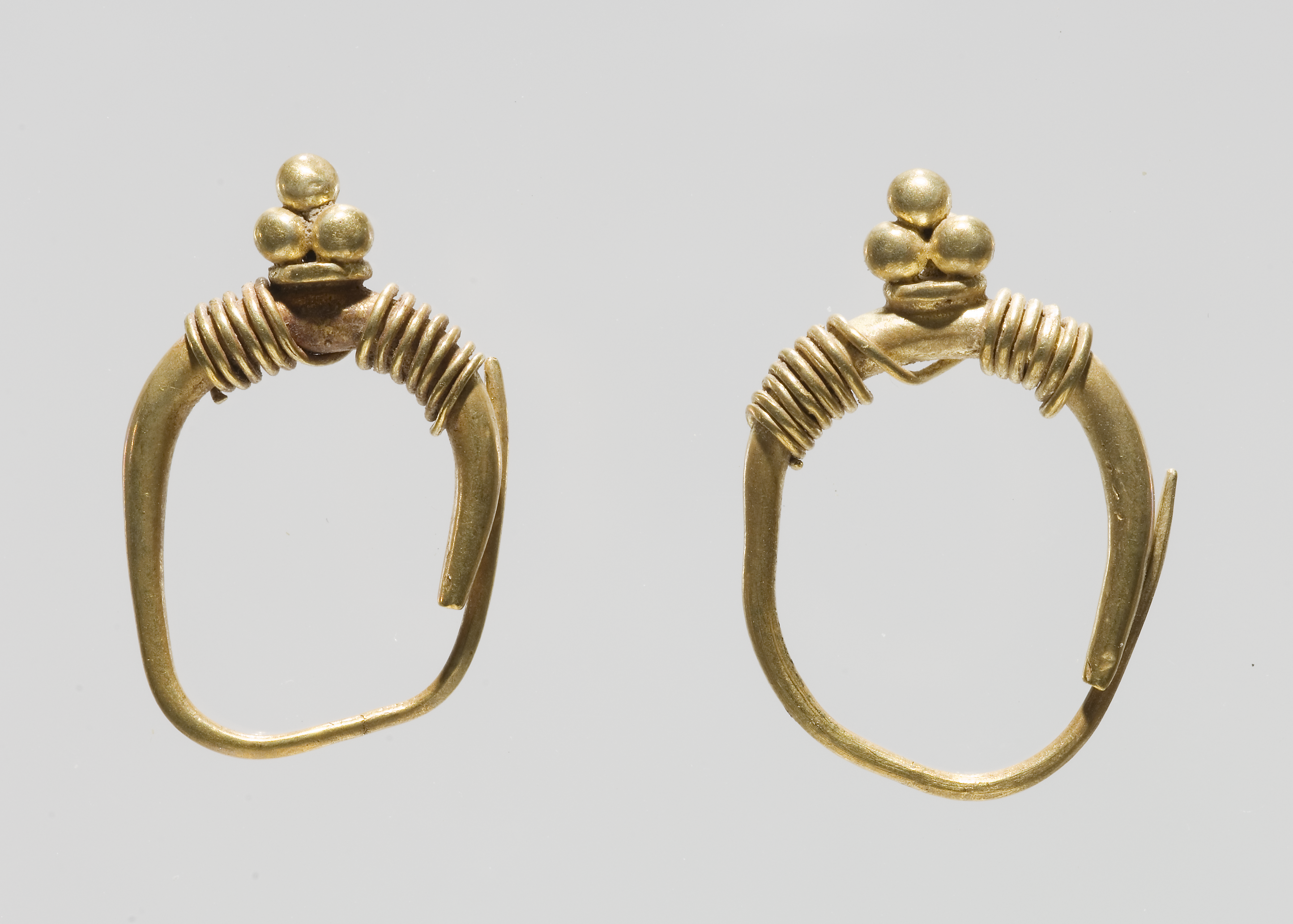
Gold earrings with overlapping ends. A cluster of small gold balls probably depicting grapes. From Lapithos, Tomb 420. Ca. 1050–950 B.C. These earrings can be seen at Medelhavsmuseet, Stockholm.

To the west of Lapithos, at Vrysi tou Barba, (Greek. Grandfather’s fountain) the expedition continued to excavate a Bronze Age necropolis. The site consists of a white limestone rock, sloping towards the sea, and have been affected by repeated flooding from the mountain streams, therefore there’s not many traces left of the necropolis today. The swedes were not the first to excavate here although they were the first to publish their investigations. Both John Myres and Menelaos Markides from the Cyprus Museum, excavated here in 1913 and 1917. The Swedish Cyprus Expedition excavated twenty-three tombs for two months with the purpose to obtain a representative series of tombs from a limited area. Most of the tombs found here is in the dromos type, with three circular chambers that open up from the dromos. They used thin slabs of local limestone as doors, and smaller stones around the sides to keep the bigger limestone in place. The excavators could noticed that the tombs were used repeatedly and sometimes cleared out between the burials. Both men and women were buried here. Most of the tombs are dated to the Early Cypriote II Middle Cypriote II period but was used during the Early Cypriote III as well. In the tombs they found a lot of pottery belonging to the Red Polished Ware.

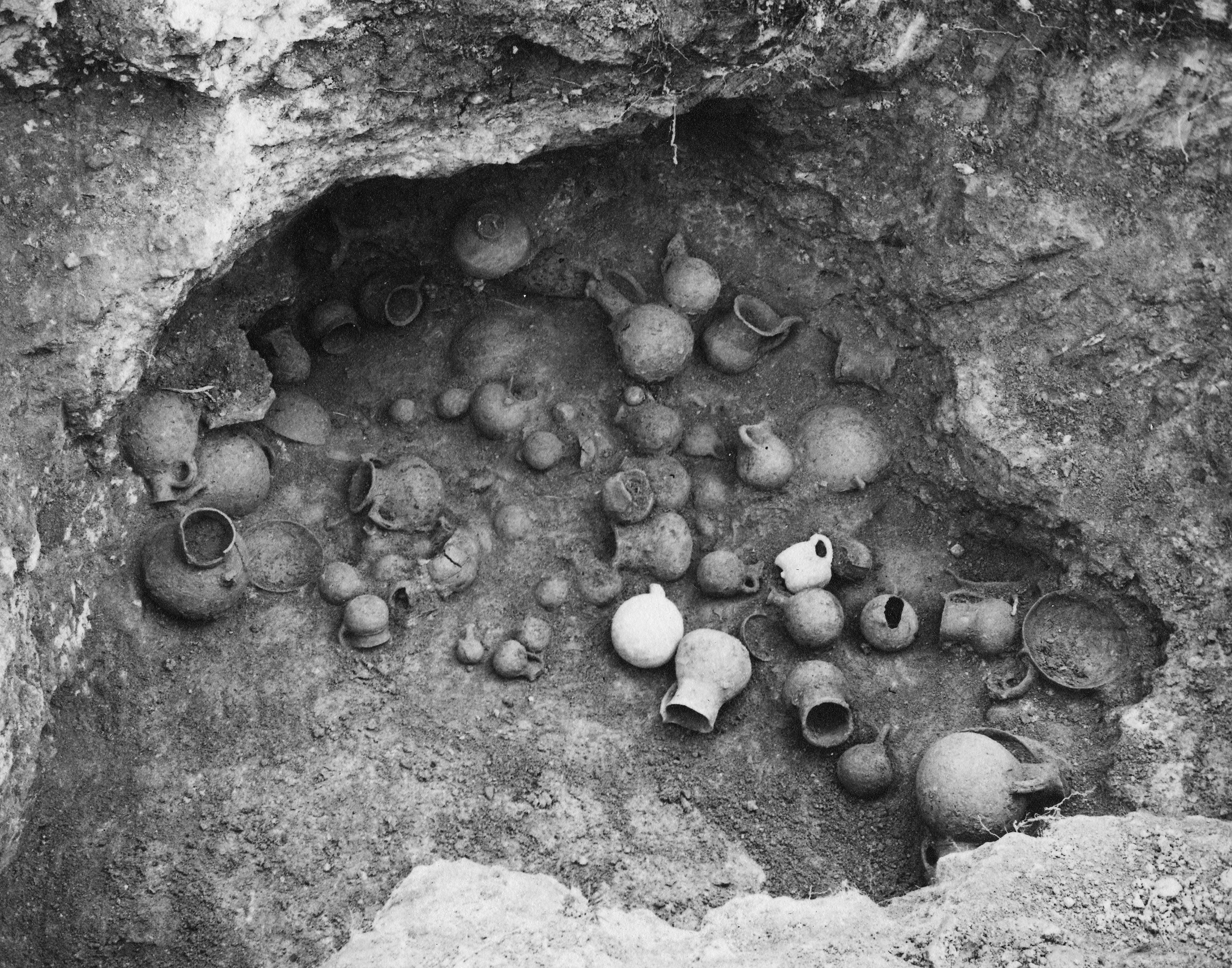
Tomb 702, in situ. Lapithos.

After the excavation at Vrysi tou Barba the Swedish Cyprus Expedition continued with the Iron age necropolis of Kastros from November 1927 until the end of April 1928. This site had never been excavated before but was plundered in Byzantine times. Here the Swedish Cyprus Expedition excavated around thirty graves. The Iron age tombs were cut into the rock. The shape of the tombs differs throughout the different periods but most of them are different kinds of dromos tombs. As seen on many necropolises in Cyprus a lot of the tombs were used for repeated but successive burials which indicate that they were family graves. Some of the graves were extremely rich in grave goods. For example, tomb 403 and 420, where women were buried carrying gold jewellery and other gold ornaments such as five gold plaques with figural representations, spindle whorls, as well as mountings that probably once decorated a headgear.

=== Enkomi, June–July 1930 ===
A rich Bronze Age necropolis, once surrounded by a wall, is located close to the ancient village of Enkomi. Enkomi is located one kilometer west of the ruins of the old Salamis, close to the river Pedieos, Cyprus's longest river. The closest modern city is Famagusta.

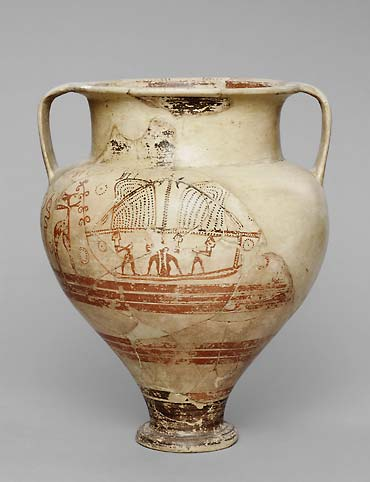
Amphoroid crater, mycenean pictorial pottery, motif of a ship and figures. Late Cypriote II, ca. 1300–1250 B.C. Tomb 3, Enkomi.

Enkomi was excavated by French, and later Cypriot, archaeologists between 1934 and 1972. About 100 tombs were excavated by an expedition sent by the British Museum on behalf of the Cyprus Exploration Fund in 1896 with archaeologists such as Alexander Stuart Murray, A.H. Smith, and a man known as Christian. Further, some tombs had already been plundered. Another 20 tombs were examined by the Swedish archaeologists for two summer months in 1930. The Swedish archaeologists began with several trial trenches that were not very successful since Byzantine houses had destroyed many of the tombs. Eventually they excavated a part of the necropolis which had never been investigated before and found very rich graves. A single grave could contain around 300 objects, mostly pottery, but also objects of gold, silver, faience, ivory, etc. In his book Sekler och dagar Einar Gjerstad’s describes how they needed to remove water from the tombs since a lot of them were below the groundwater level and therefore filled with water and difficult to excavate.

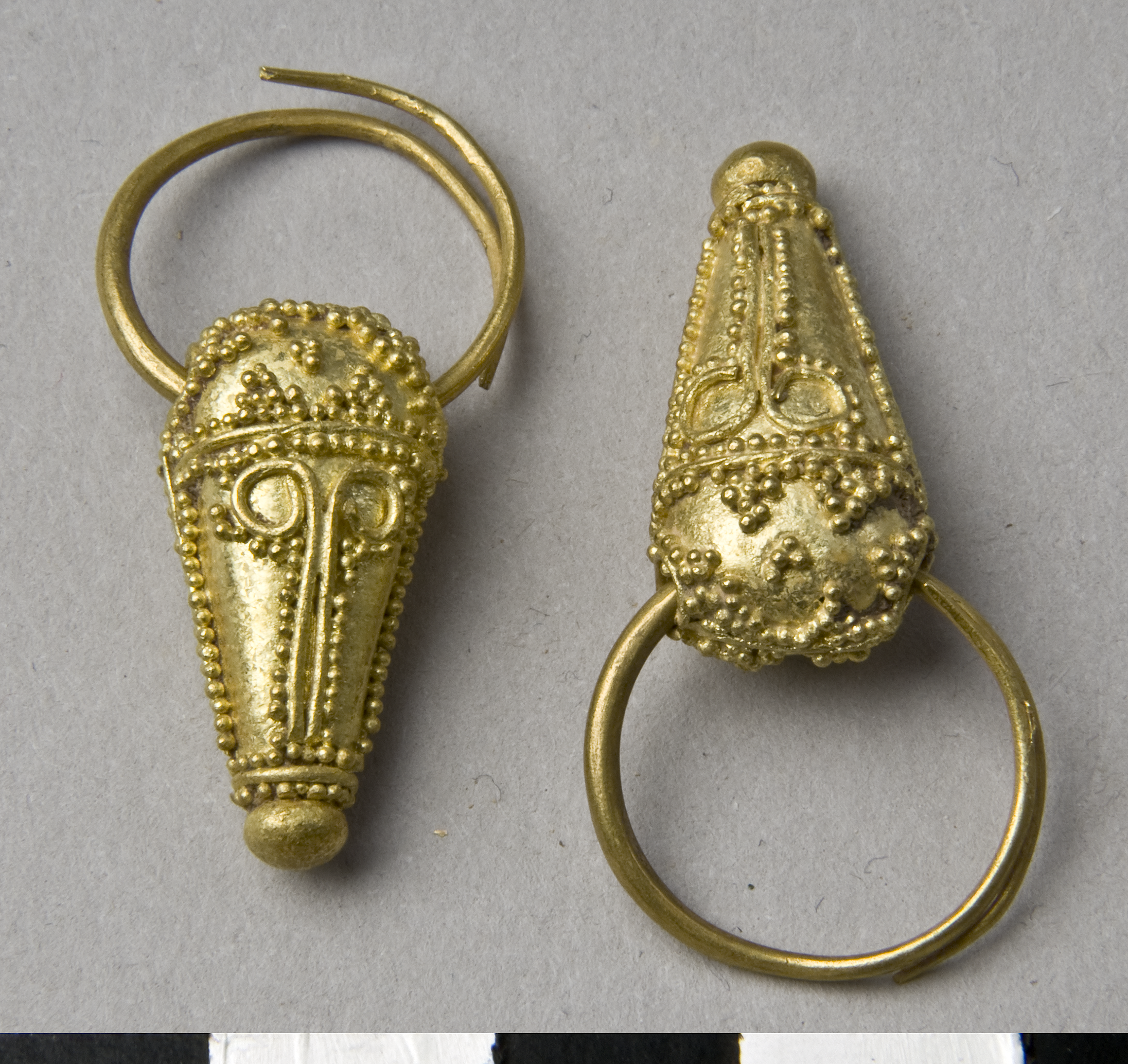
A pair of gold earrings in the shape of ornamental and conventionalized bull’ heads. The pendants are decorated with very fine granulations in straight lines, circles, and triangles, and end in balls. Excavated in tomb 11, Enkomi. Late Cypriote II, ca. 1450–1200 B.C.

The burial practice here began around the Late Cypriote II and Middle Cypriote IIIC. The majority of the tombs are from Late Cypriote II. Many tombs have a dromos that leads to the stomion and then one or two chambers. Sometimes the tombs were reused and sometimes they only had one burial. The wealth and importance of this burial ground improved with the years until the Late Cypriote III period, when there was a break in the development the types of tombs changed and they began to have very poor contents. Instead of rock-cut chamber tombs, occasionally covered by mounds of earth, and filled with rich finds, they started to use shaft tombs dug in the earth, sometimes even in the mounds of the old tombs, with few and simple gifts. The Levanto-Helladic pottery, so characteristic of the previous period, is missing entirely, and its place is taken by Plain White Wheel-made Wares of advanced types.

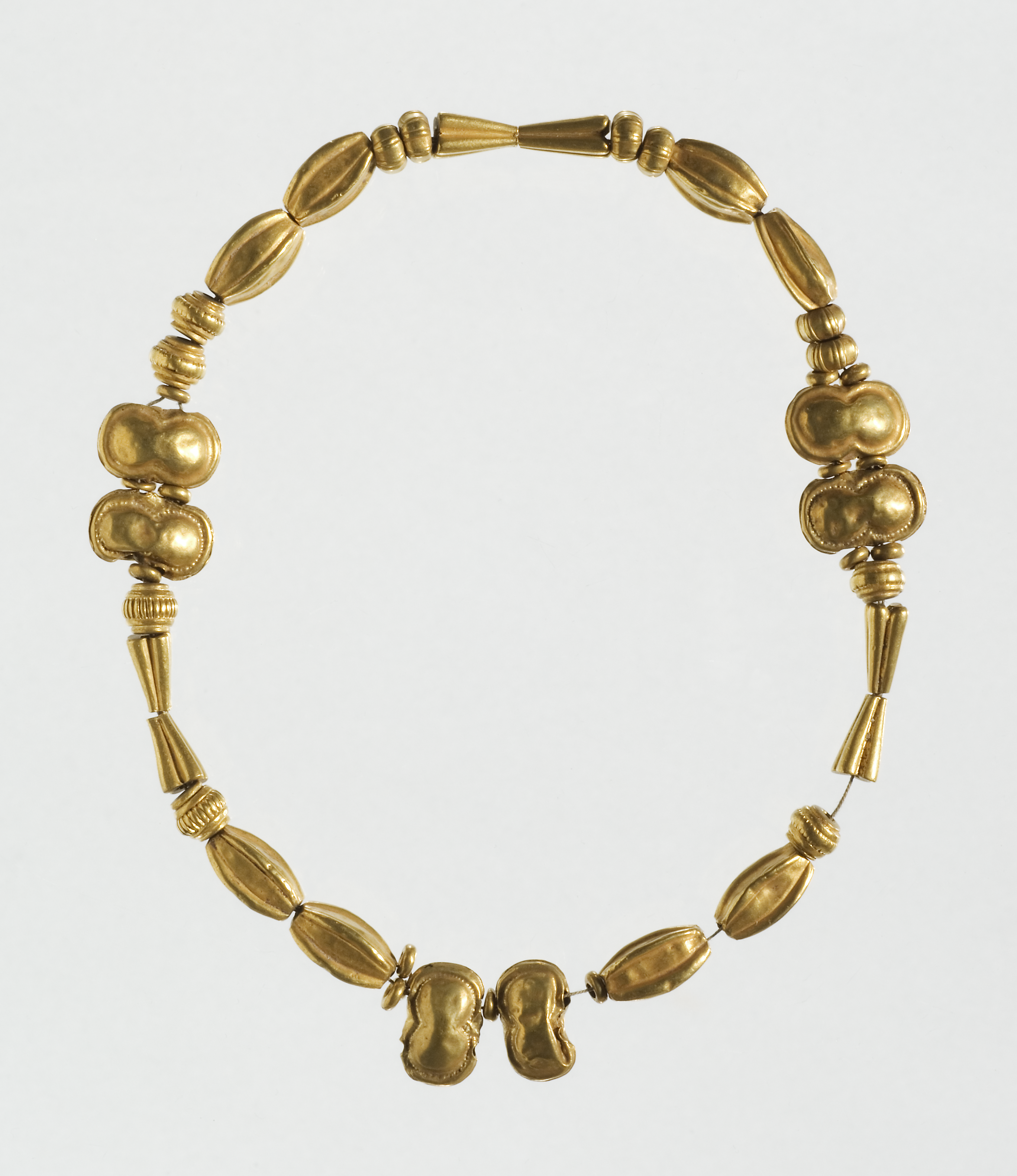
Gold necklace consisting of 46 different gold beads, some are in the shape of seeds and shields. Excavated in Tomb 3 at Enkomi. Late Cypriote II, ca. 1450–1200 BC. This copy can be seen at Medelhavsmuseet, Stockholm. The original can be found at the Cyprus Museum, Nicosia.

The deceased were found sitting or lying down. They wore robes, fastened together with gold pins. Some had diadems on their foreheads decorated with geometric ornaments, floral motifs or figures, and gold tin over their mouths. One of the women wore a gold necklace in the shape of Mycenaean shields. This was a Minoan motif and was introduced to Cyprus by the Mycenaeans. Similar shields are depicted on frescoes in, for example, Knossos on Crete. The same woman also had rings in her hair, ears, and on her fingers and toes. Earrings were common jewelry in the 14th–13th centuries B.C. in Cyprus and were used by both men and women. Objects made of ivory, as well as perfume bottles made of glass and faience were also found, as well as Cypriot pottery, Mycenaean vases, and ostrich eggs. Furthermore, the archaeologists found food and drink in bronze and ceramic vessels placed around the buried. The finds testify to luxury and exotic imports from surrounding countries.

=== Amathus April–May 1930 ===
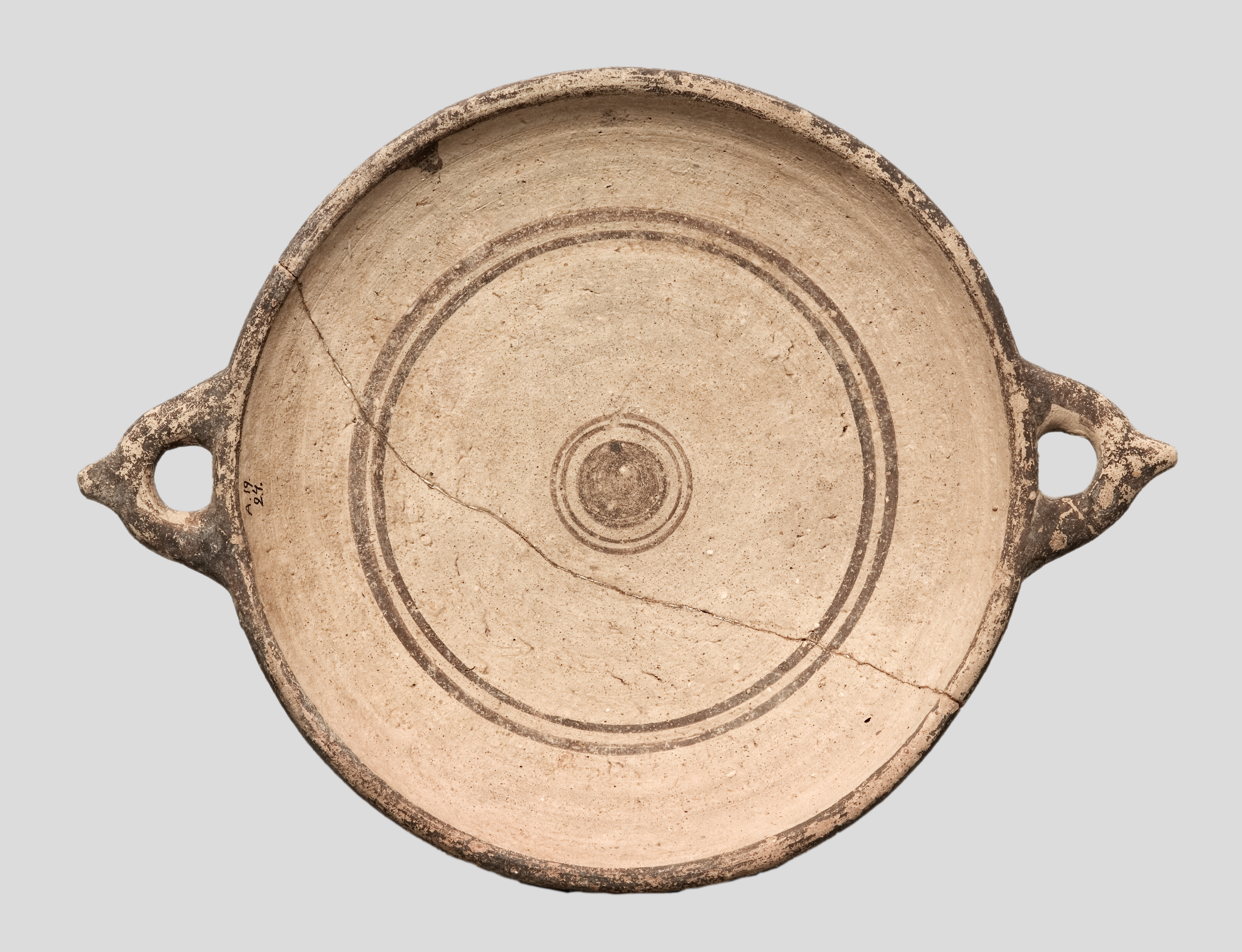
Bichrome III Plate.From tomb 19, Amathus. ca. 1050–850 B.C. Can be seen at Medelhavsmuseet.

From April to May 1930 the Swedish Cyprus Expedition excavated a necropolis located on both sides of the Acropolis. Amathus was known and visited during the 18th century and 19th centuries by travelers and archaeologists. Earlier excavators, such as General Luigi Palma Di Cesnola, the first American consul in Cyprus, excavated the necropolis' large tombs situated north of the acropolis and the tombs in the necropolis west of the acropolis hill. Since he did not publish any plans or drawings John Lindros illustrated two of the tombs from the old excavations that were still possible to visit. The necropolis had partly been excavated by the English Expedition to Cyprus in 1893–94 and published in Excavations in Cyprus, London 1900. The Swedish Cyprus Expedition excavated around 25 tombs.

The inside of tomb 2, Amathus.

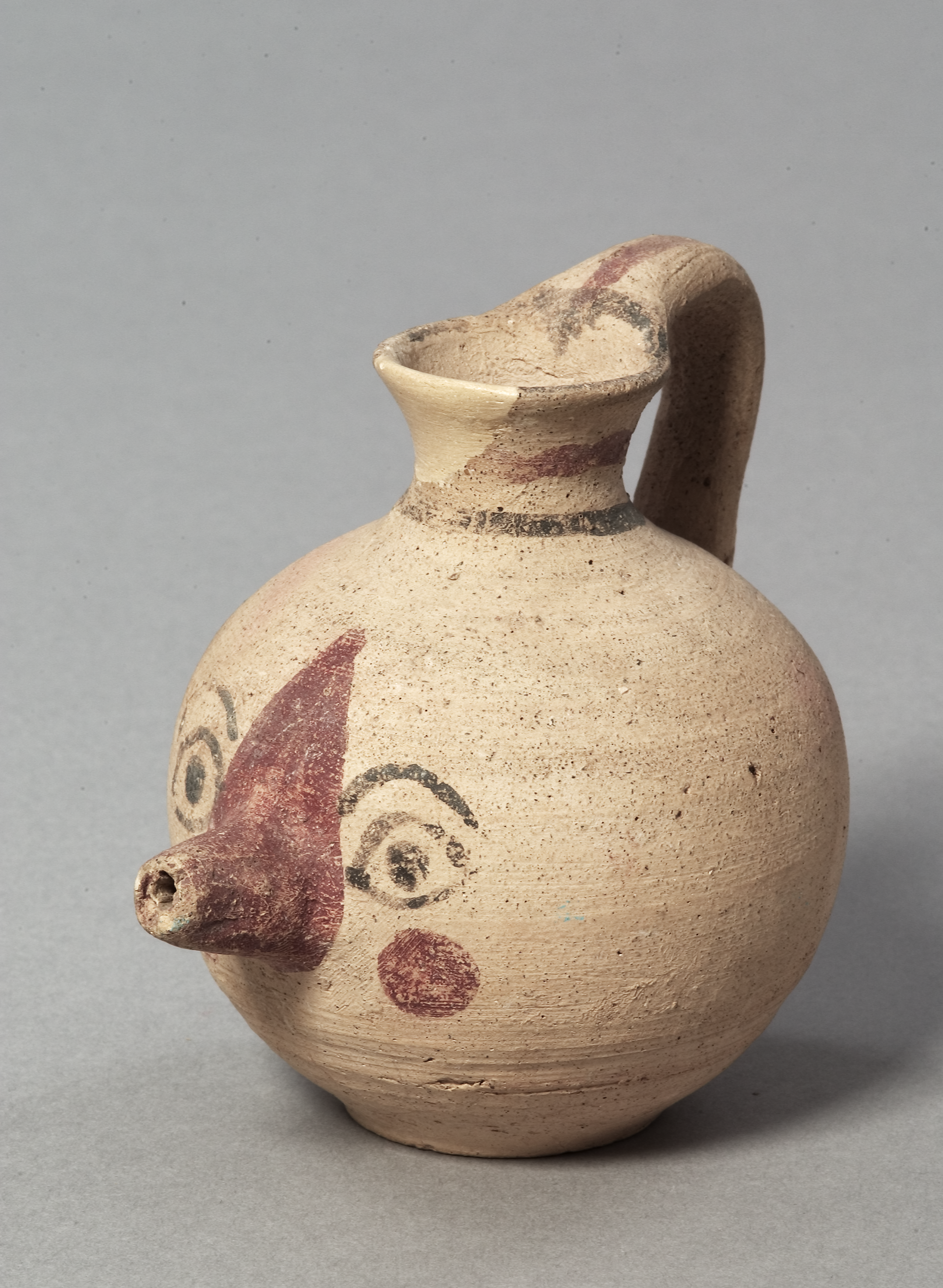
Feeding bottle from tomb 9, Amathus. Ca. 600–475 B.C. Can be seen at Medelhavsmuseet.

The tombs excavated here are shaft tombs with a dromos, which are rather rare in Cyprus. Variations of the shaft tombs occur, mostly because of the various circumstances of space and economics as well as difficulties in cutting the rock. The archaeologist identified six different styles. It is the shape of the dromos that differs the most between the different styles. Tombs 1 and 2 differ from the others in the sense of construction and quality and might have been created for wealthier people, maybe royals. Tomb 3 is more reminiscent of the other graves found in Cyprus since it is a chamber tomb. Tomb no. 26 had a large tumulus and might have been related to other Hellenistic tumuli. It contained a stone pithos with an alabastron in which a burnt skeleton was found. Around the rim of the alabastron a wreath of gilded myrtle leaves was placed. The excavator thought it might have been a Ptolemaic official who died in Amathus and was buried according to a foreign burial custom.

Otherwise, the same burial customs were observed in most of the tombs. Many were reused multiple times, in which case the burial gifts were pushed into the corner of the tomb. Later, during the Hellenistic and Roman periods, Amathus was once again used for burial. These burials did not damage or alternate the earlier tombs since they were usually somewhere in the upper layers. The tombs are dated from the Cypro-Geometric I to the Roman period.

=== Stylli ===
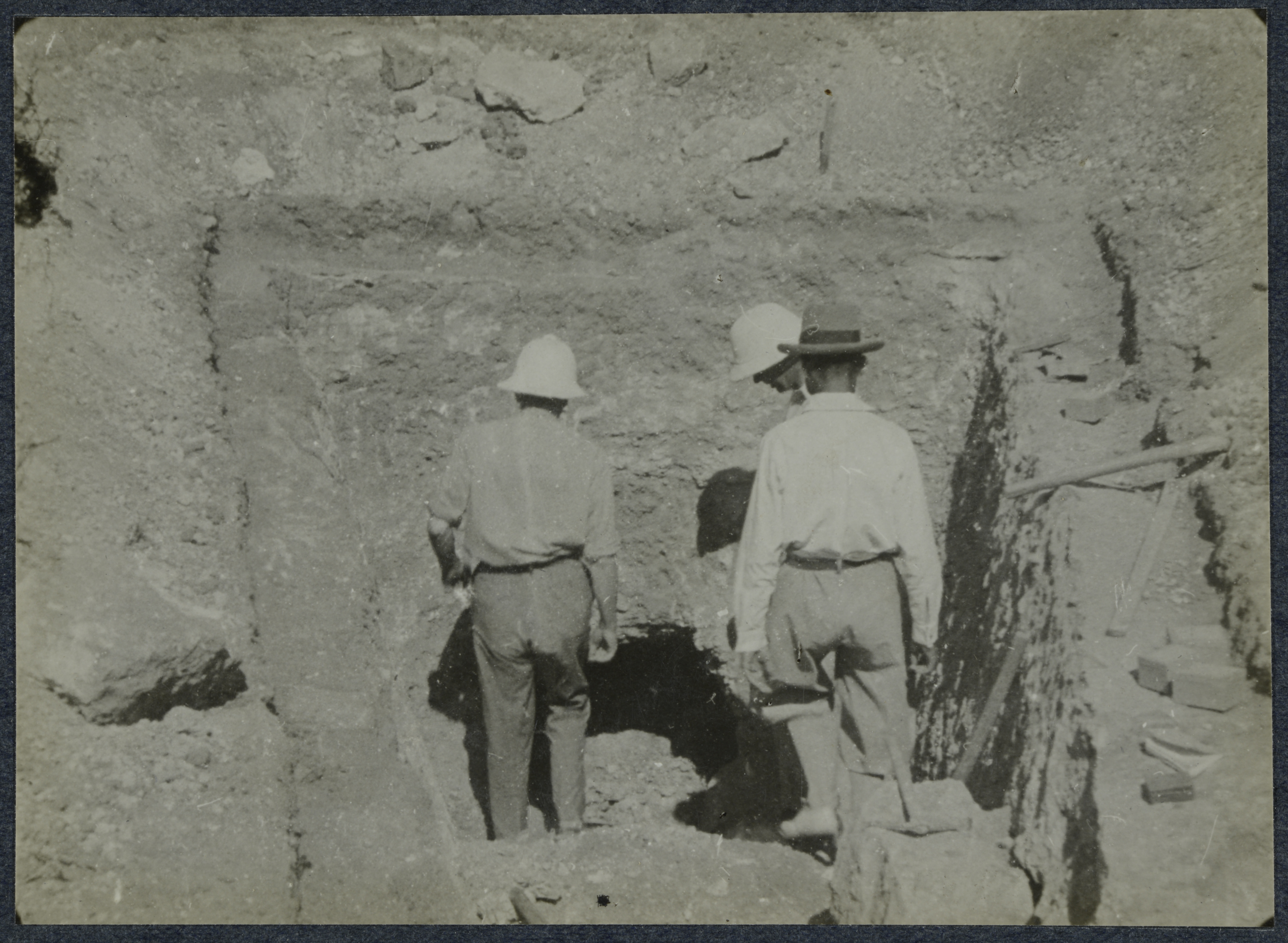
This picture probably depicts the Crown Prince of Sweden, Gustaf Adolf VI, at the excavation of Stylli in Cyprus.

Close to the modern village of Stylloi, northwest of Famagusta on the Mesaoria plain, the Swedish Cyprus Expedition excavated a necropolis. The site was known before and Mr. Rubert Gunnis, inspector of Antiquities in Cyprus, excavated here in 1928. The Swedish excavations commenced at the highest part of the terrace and thereafter continued on the southern slope. During this excavation, the Crown Prince of Sweden, Gustaf VI Adolf visited the site and excavated himself.

Different kind of pottery from Stylli, tomb 10.

The tombs on the plateau, where the ground mainly consists of the local chavara, have all spacious dromoi and are from a typical point of view rather different from the ones on the southern slope. The former is long with a more or less regularly sloping floor, in some cases stairs are preserved. The latter are much shorter and widen much more abruptly. Their floor is horizontal. Both types have irregular chambers that usually are smaller than the big dromos. The burial customs are the same in all tombs. The buried were found outstretched on their back, surrounded by burial gifts. Coffins were not used. The burial place was used from Cypro-Geometric IIIA until Cypro-Archaic IIA. During the Cypro-Geometric period until Cypro-Archaic I the burials were made at the plateau. In the following periods, these tombs were reused at the same time as the southern slope became more popular.

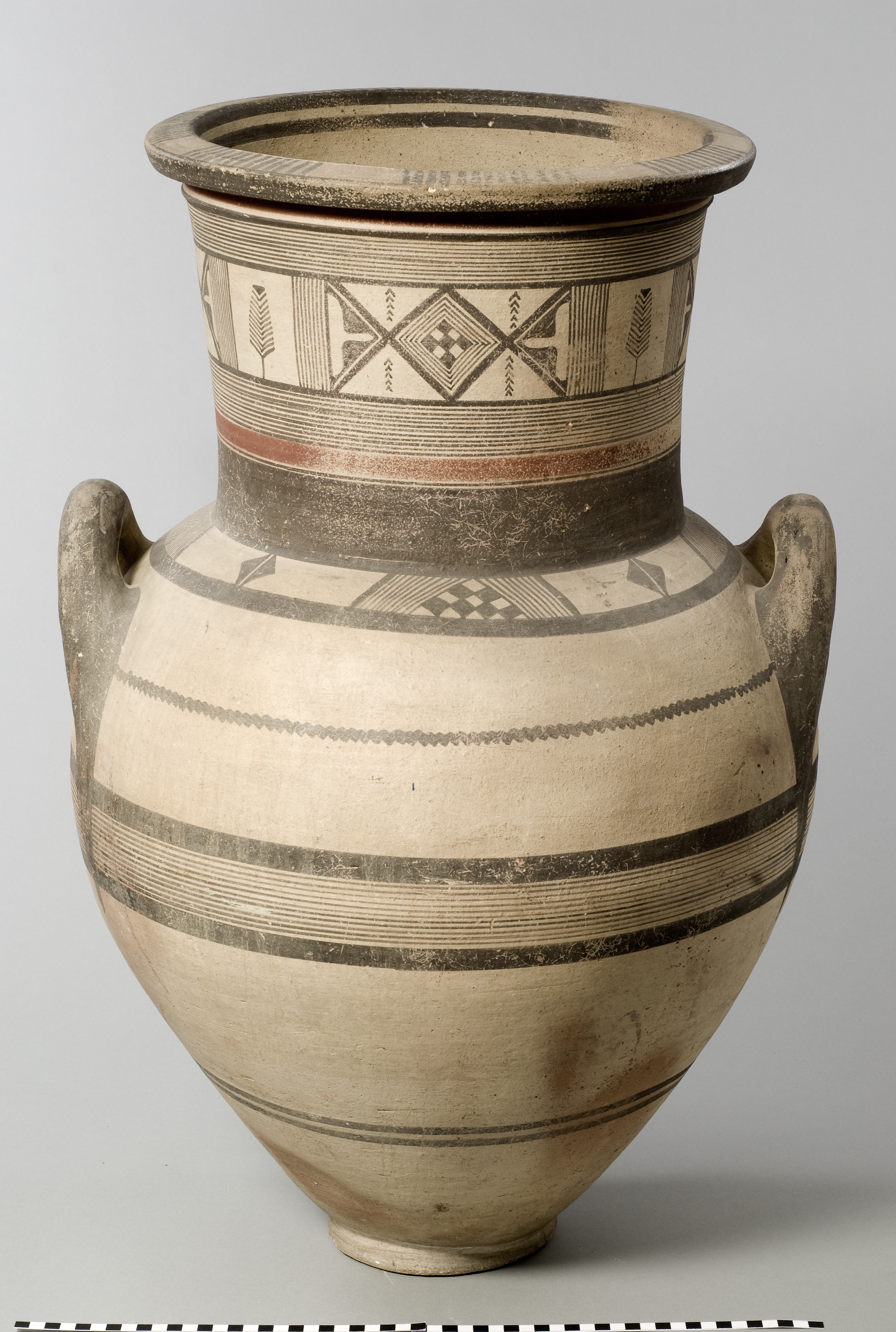
Large Bichrome Amphora from Stylli, ca. 850–700 B.C. Can be seen at Medelhavsmuseet.

=== Idalion ===
The western acropolis at Idalion.

At Idalion the Swedish Cyprus Expedition excavated a settlement. With the information obtained from the architecture and other archaeological material they concluded that the habitation commenced towards the end of the Late Bronze Age (Late Cypriote IIIC) The acropolis was fortified with a rampart made of mud-brick on a stone foundation. The fortification followed the natural formation of the hill and was therefore curved. It had three gates, The north, west, and west side gate. During the Late Cypriote B, another rampart was built over the remains of the old one. The houses were made of mud-brick walls on a rubble foundation. The floors were rammed earth and the roofs were probably made of reed and mud. The shape of the rooms changed during the different periods, trapezoidal in Late Cypriote III A and rectangular in Late Cypriote III B and C. It seems like the houses were not built as a complex although separate rooms with a cult house in the center, surrounded by storehouses and a house for the priest and chief of the city, was recognized. Inside the cult room, the archaeologists found a small altar and a deposit of carbonized vegetables, terracotta bulls, terracotta jugs that were probably used for libations, and various minor objects that were probably votive gifts. The archaeologist proposed that this was a cult of fertility.

During the Cypro-Geometric period, the settlement changed. Now the acropolis was occupied by a sanctuary of the temenos type. It is not until Cypro-Geometric III that reliable architectural and stratigraphical evidence appears with information about the new sanctuary. The sanctuary was placed inside the fortification wall and consisted of an altar court and a square altar of stone as well as the cult building. In Cypro-Archaic I the temenos were enlarged and a massive tower was built. The sanctuary and the fortification were repaired and rebuilt over time. The votive gifts from this sanctuary mainly consisted of weapons and tools of different kinds, as well as personal accessories such as pins, fibulae, earrings, bracelets, and different kinds of pottery. The cult figure was not found but the archaeologists thought that the deity worshipped here was a version of the goddess Athena. The Phoenicians called her Anat. According to bilinguistic inscriptions from Larnaca tis Lapithou these two goddesses were regarded as identical at Cyprus. It does not seem like she had a Cypriote name but might have a version of the Queen of animals or the Mistress of Idalion, the city goddess.

=== Agia Eirini November 1929 ===
The excavation at Agia Eirini. Papa Prokopios and workers.

During the summer of 1929, the Swedish Cyprus Expedition was visited by the priest Papa Prokopios. Prokopios had caught a looter on his field at the village of Agia Eirini. He decided to visit the museum in Nicosia and brought the upper part of a terracotta statue from the beginning of the sixth century B.C. with him. Thereafter, the Swedish Cyprus Expedition obtained the excavation rights and commenced an excavation on Prokopius field. The site turned out to be an undisturbed sanctuary that was used since the Late Bronze Age, (Late Cypriote III), 1200 B.C, and lasted until the end of the Cypro-Archaic period. The most important period is dated to 650–500 B.C. since most of the finds discovered were from that time. They found 2000 figures half a meter under the sandy soil. The figures were lying and standing, grouped in the form of a semicircle, reminiscent of a theatre. The figures depicted priests, warriors, and ordinary people. Some bring offerings, dance or play musical instruments. Chariots with horses and bulls were found as well. The statues are of different sizes, the biggest one is life-sized. One of them is called the sacrificial priest and he wears a long robe and a turban. According to the excavators, he probably held a sacrificial knife in his raised left hand.

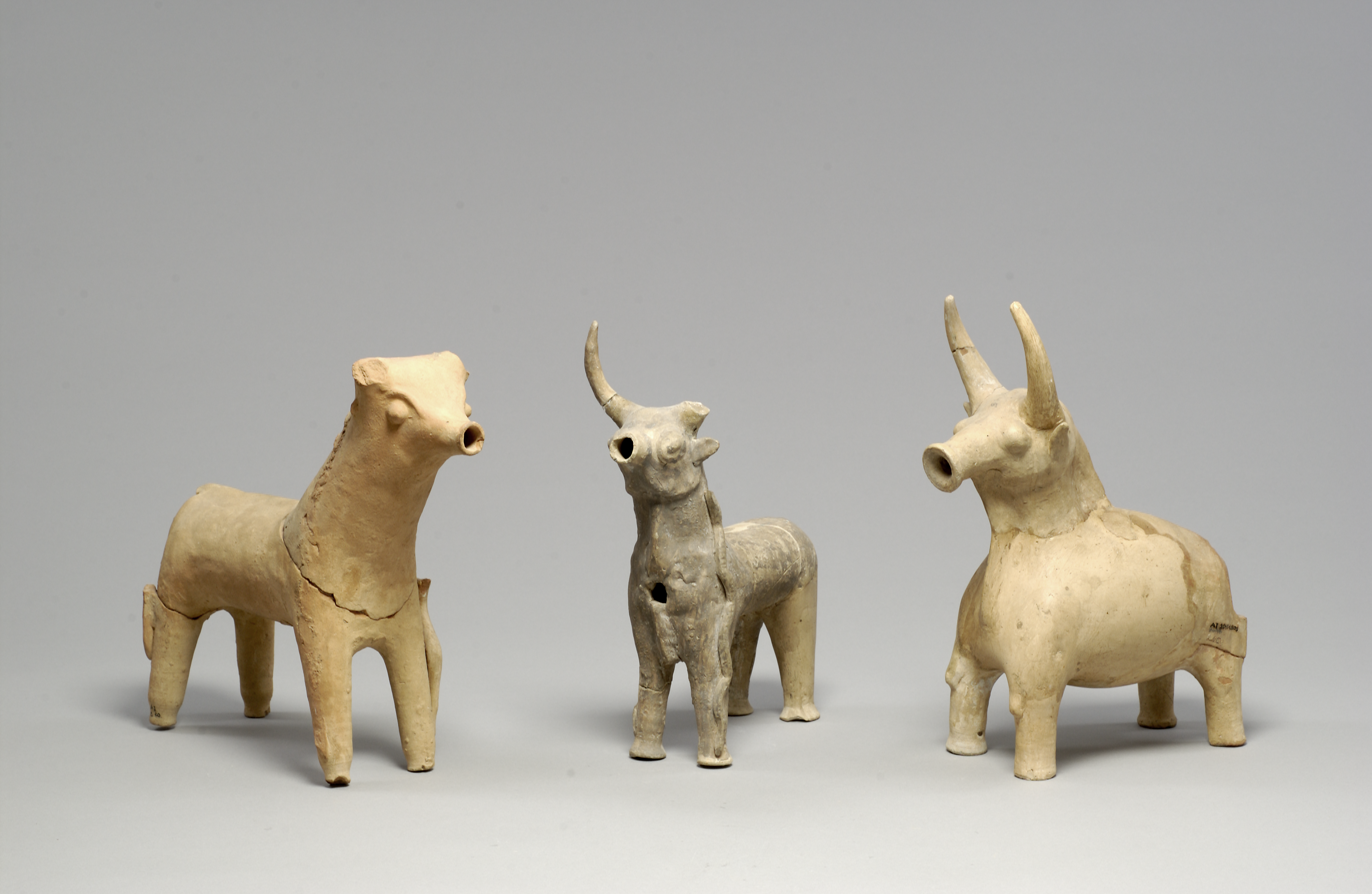
Three terracotta bulls from Agia Eirini. Can be seen at Medelhavsmuseet.

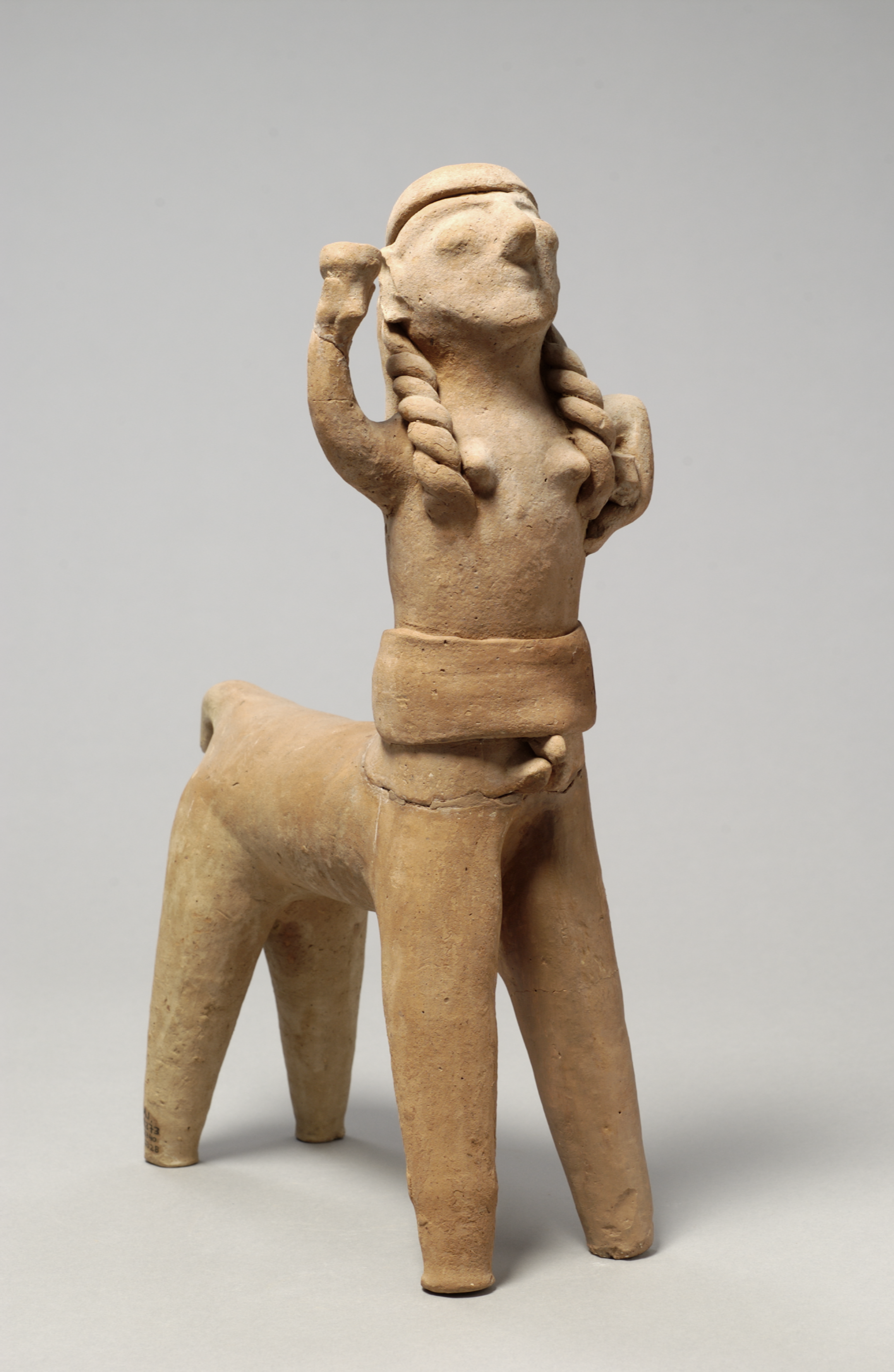
Terracotta minotaur figurine with male genital organs and female breasts. Agia Eirini. Can be seen at Medelhavsmuseet.

In the beginning, the sanctuary consisted of a complex of rectangular houses with walls built of mud brick on solid stone foundations of rubble. The houses are isolated along the sides of a large open court. It seems like the western and northern houses were used by the priests as living rooms as well as storerooms. The central and southern houses were probably used for cult purposes with the central house being the central cult house. It consists of two rooms and all the cult objects were found here, for example offering tables, large pithoi, bowls, libation vases, a cult axe of stone, and a terracotta bull. The excavators had the impression that the cult was an agrarian one that worshipped deities who protected the crops and cattle and filled the store-rooms with corn, wine, olives, honey, and vegetables. Products of these kinds were probably offered to the deities among the other votive objects as well. The excavators did not find the official cult object but pointed out that the deity could have been worshipped in the shape of a bull, which is representative of the cult’s character of fertility since bulls are connected with fertility. The cult object could have been destroyed or removed. In the later temenos the cult object was an oval stone and this sacred stone, or betyl, could have been the cult object in the earlier cult as well and then moved to the new sanctuary.

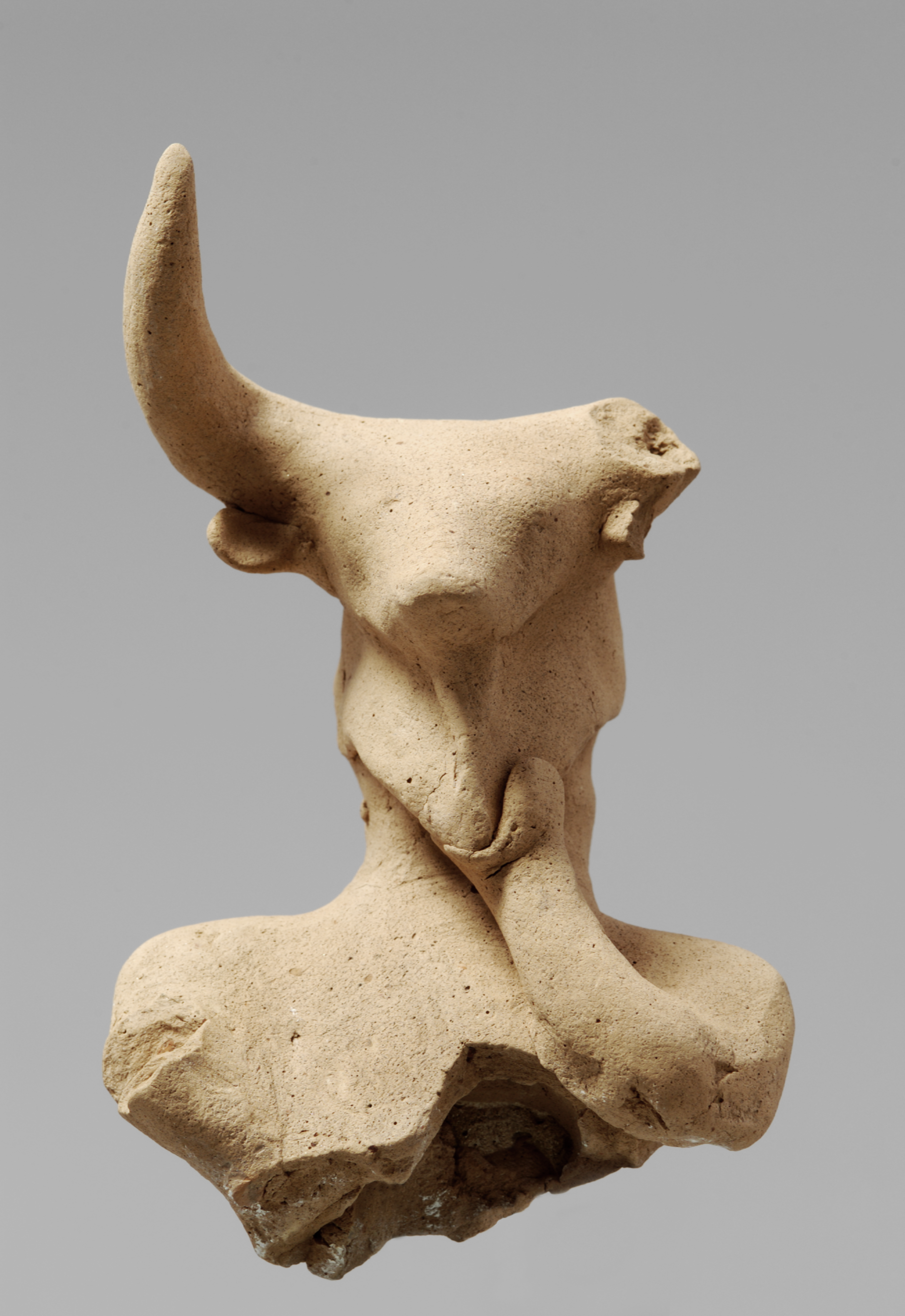
Terracotta figurine with a bull mask. Agia Eirini.

The old sanctuary was covered by red earth and a new one was erected on the top. This sanctuary was different from the first. Instead of a closed and roofed cult house with other buildings together creating a rectangular complex, the new sanctuary was an open temenos of irregular shape surrounded by a peribolos wall of red earth. A low altar was built in the temenos close to a libation table. The majority of the votive offerings from this period were terracotta bulls which were placed around the altar. The altar was covered with layers of ash, carbonized matter as well as animal bones. Therefore, the excavators concluded that the cult remained a fertility cult with a deity conceived in the shape of a bull. Furthermore, it seems like the cult began with blood sacrifices in this Geometric period. This sanctuary continued until the middle of Cypro-Geometric III when it changed again. The temenos area remained as before but the peribolos walls were heightened and a new, rectangular pillar was erected as the new altar. The old terracotta votives were moved to a deposit close to the new altar. During this period the motives of the votives changed as well. Animal statuettes remained, but minotaur statuettes and human figures appeared as well. Therefore some of the old types remained in combination with new modified types. Some of the bulls and minotaurs have snakes along their neck and back. The snake can be seen as a fertility symbol. Further, the deity worshipped became more anthropomorphic around this period. The human figures can be interpreted as the worshippers themselves. The armed figures and chariot statuettes might imply that the god was a god of war as well as fertility.

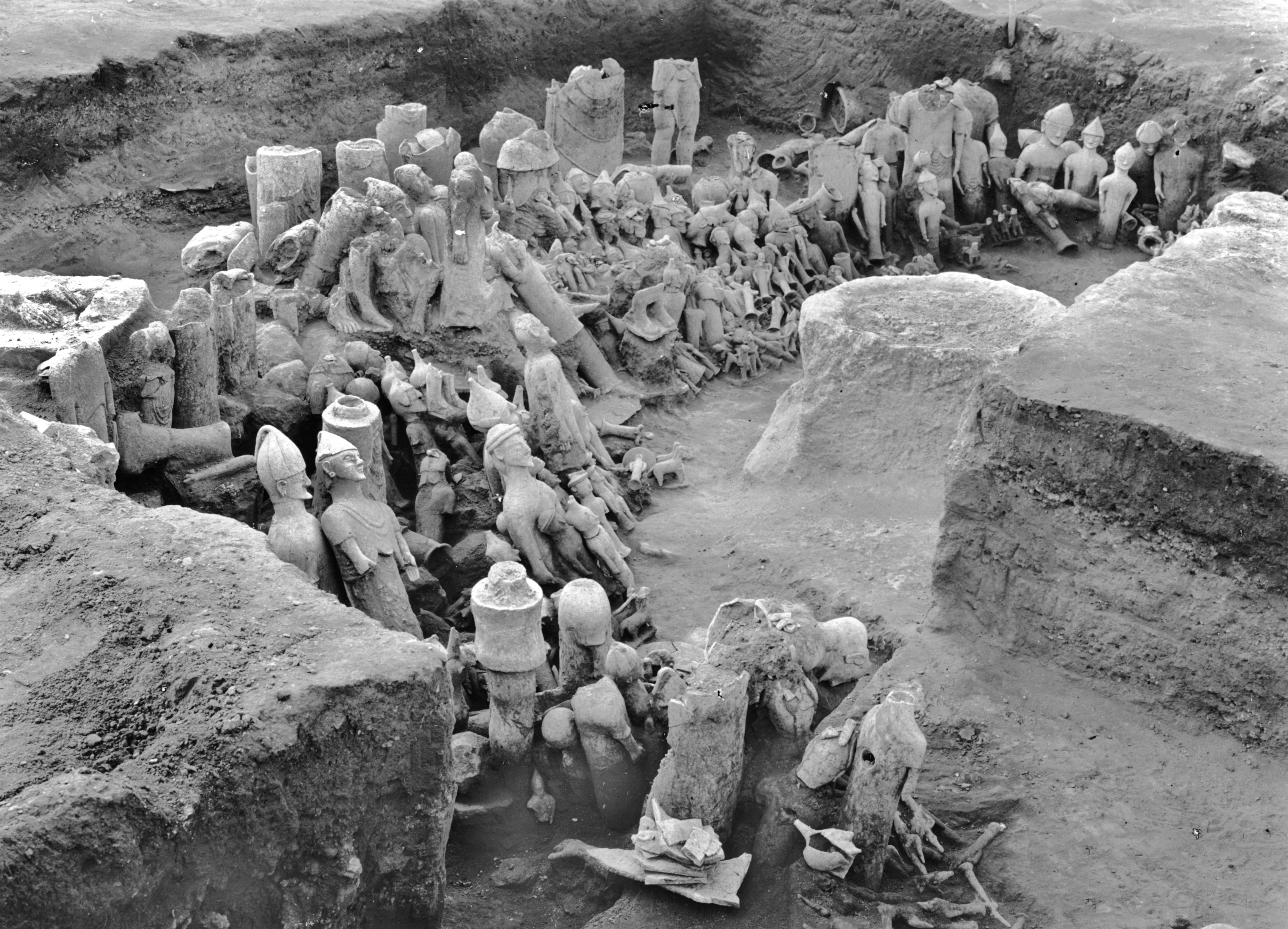
The excavation of Agia Eirini.

During the middle of the Cypro-Archaic I period, a new temenos was again placed on top of the old one. The cult continued as before which the continuity of the votives, which were moved to the new sanctuary, displayed. This period is the great period of the Agia Eirini sanctuary. The same altar as before was used but the temenos were widened. A new peribolos was built around this bigger sanctuary. Two buildings were erected in the south and seem to have been used as enclosures for sacred trees, similar to the Minoan enclosures. Because the excavators found figures with bull’s masks these were interpreted as priests, which may be a clue to how at least some of the cult’s rituals were performed. Further, many figurines with tambourines and flutes indicate that music was an important feature of the cult. The votives consist mostly of terracotta statues of different sizes which were arranged around the altar in semicircles. The smallest ones were placed nearest the altar and the larger statutes in the back.

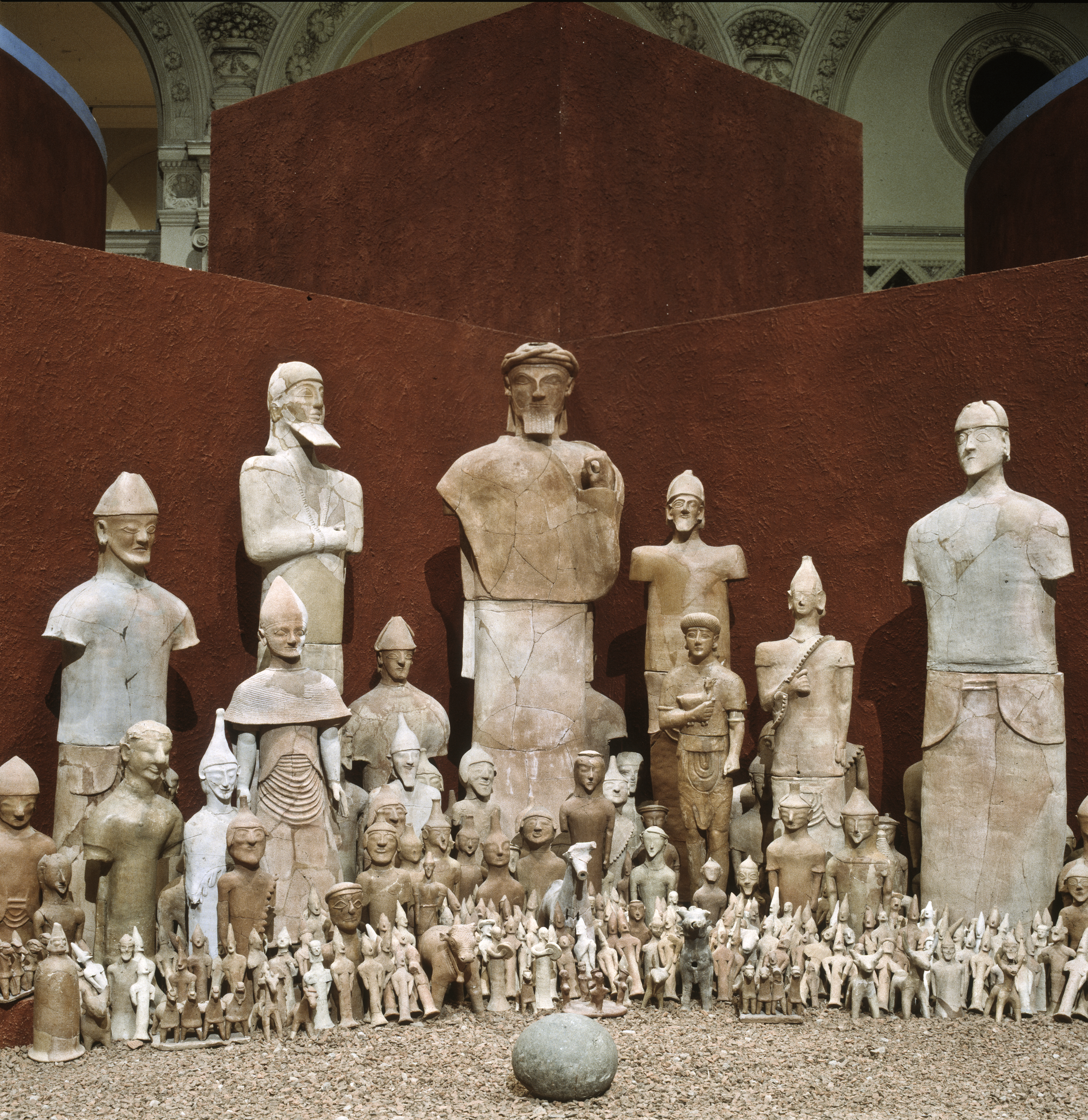
Photograph from one of the Cyprus Exhibitions at Medelhavsmuseet with the terracotta sculptures and the betyl (stone) from Agia Eirini.

At the beginning of Cypro-Archaic II the sanctuary was flooded and covered with a layer of sand and gravel, which made some smaller changes to the sanctuary although the cult recovered. Later, the sanctuary was flooded again, and again. At the beginning of the final phase of Cypro-Archaic, 510–500 B.C. the flood was so severe that the sanctuary was abandoned. During the 1st century B.C., a revival of the cult took place, but this was a much smaller and poorer cult that did not leave many remains behind. Much later, a small church for Ayia Irini (Holy Peace) was built on the same site. Later, in modern times, the sanctuary was forgotten and became a field until the day when Papa Prokopios realized that he had grown his corn on top of ancient terracotta sculptures.

On the other side of the valley, there is a necropolis with rock-cut tombs. The earliest tombs here are from the Cypro-Geometric period and the latest are from Roman times. Further down, close to the sea, the ruins of a small ancient town are situated. The earliest of the datable finds observed here are from the Hellenistic period.

=== Kition, October 1929–April 1930 ===
Kition. The cult room. Statues in situ. Some depict Herakles-Melqart and are probably from the Sub Archaic Style–Early Cypro-Classical I, ca 480–450 B.C.

The Swedish Cyprus Expedition's excavations in Kition began in October 1929 and continued until April 1930, with a break during the winter season. Kition was the ancient capital of the Phoenician colony in Cyprus. The ruins can be found within the borders of the modern town of Larnaca. The ancient city was surrounded by massive walls which can still be traced today. At the Bamboula hill, in the northeastern part of the city, was the acropolis. Here, the Swedes discovered a sanctuary dedicated to Heracles-Melqart. Between the acropolis and the modern seashore was the ancient harbour. In 1879 the Government of Cyprus filled this marshy area with soil from the upper strata of the Bamboula Hill because they wished to get rid of the malaria mosquitos. Because of this the Bamboula Hill and especially the upper layers of the acropolis were much disturbed. A small part of the city was excavated as early as 1894 by british archeologists.

The Swedish archaeologists attempted a stratigraphic examination of the Bamboula mound to obtain information about the dating of the Phoenician colonization of Cyprus. They wanted to study the ceramic development and collect archaeological material to elucidate how the Phoenicians affected the development of the Cypriote culture. But, after three days of digging, they found a large deposit of sculptures and needed to subsequently enlarge the excavation.

The excavation of Kition. The rectangular base of a statue, the statue itself is missing.

According to The Swedish Cyprus Expedition, the acropolis commenced as a settlement from the end of the Late Cypriote II and the beginning of Cypro Geometric I period before it became a sanctuary. Throughout the time of the Cypro-Archaic I something changed, and Kition began to be used as an open-air sanctuary. The Swedish Expedition did not find any votive sculptures from this early stage, therefore the votives might have been of a different kind or removed to a place outside the excavation. They did find a rectangular base of a statue called no. 560. The statue itself was missing with only the feet preserved. This sculpture was probably very big and could have been Kition’s cult statue. Later, the cult erected a rectangular altar made of rubble and chips of stone in front of the statue.

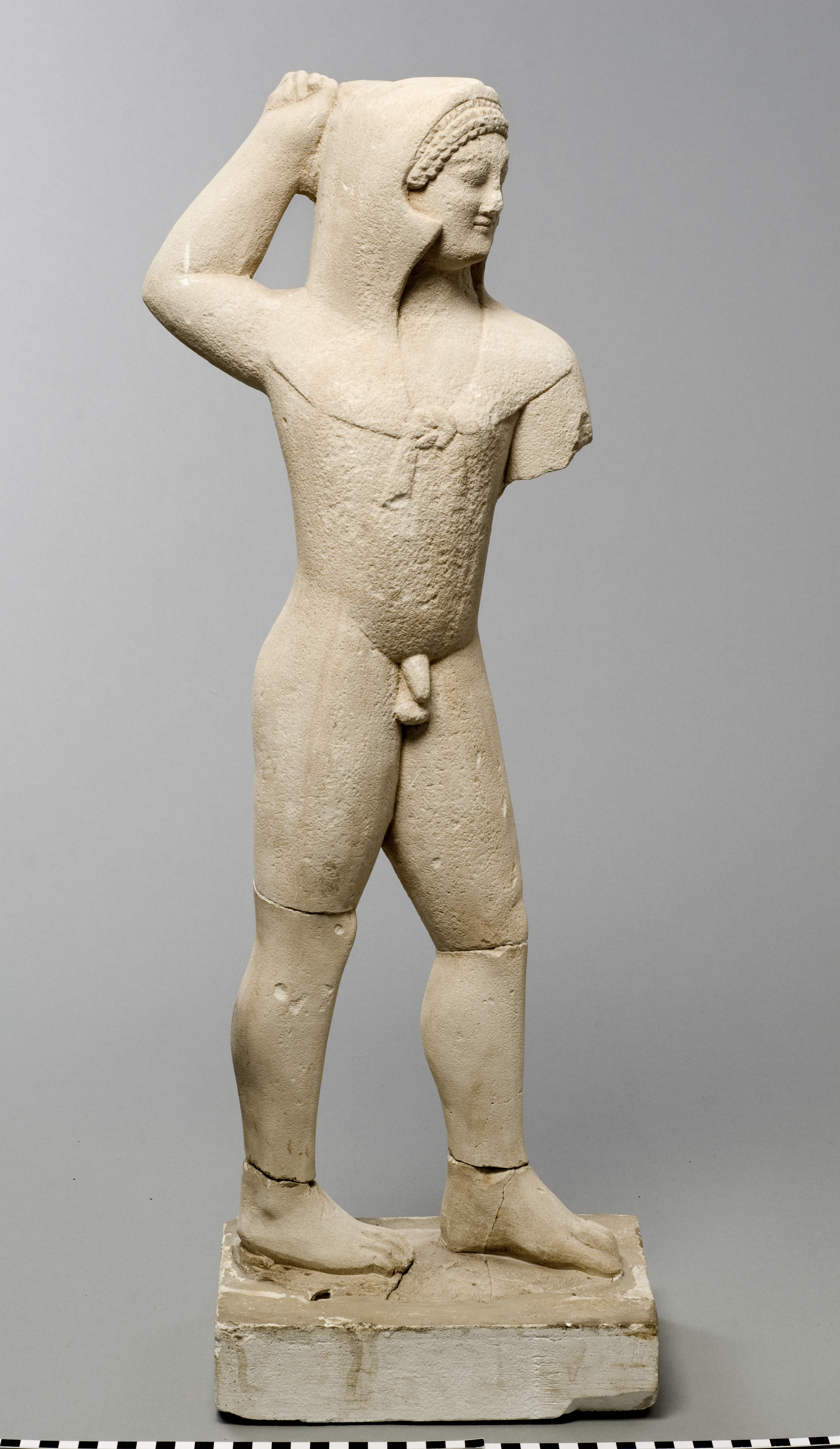
Herakles or Herakles Melqart statue standing on a rectangular base with legs and head shown in profile, torso en face. Nude except for lionskin with paws knotted on the chest. Head of lionskin with teeth resting on Herakles’ head which has notched hair over forehead. Left arm raised with fist attached to the back of the head (formerly holding a club, now missing). Almond-shaped eyes and a faint smile. The back is roughly worked. From ca. 480–450 B.C. Kition. Can be seen at Medelhavsmuseet.

The temenos were in use until the end of the Cypro-Archaic II period when a new temenos was built on top of the old one. This temenos was enclosed by a massive peribolos wall. Furthermore, it seems like an inner temenos was created at the same place as the earlier walls had been. Within the inner temenos a low altar consisting of a square was found, as well as another pillar altar outside. Both on the altar itself and close to it the archaeologists found remains of ash and carbonized matter. All through the periods votive gifts, mainly consisting of sculptures, were placed in the sanctuary, and each time the level was raised the sculptures were transferred to the new sanctuary. Throughout the Cypro-Classic I period, the temenos were rearranged entirely and became more monumental. This sanctuary was the last one before the sanctuary was demolished in the Hellenistic period and secular buildings were erected in the same place. During the demolition, all the votive sculptures were buried, and the place was no longer used for sacred purposes. The Hellenistic house was divided into two parts and inside archaeologists found remains of a basalt press for pressing wine or oil, as well as rectangular drainage outlets and a storage vessel.

During the excavation, they found no inscriptions that could inform us to whom this sanctuary was dedicated, although some of the sculptures might represent the god and thence give us an answer. Most of the sculptures dressed in lion’s skin and a club in the right hand, are a Cypriot variety of the Greek Heracles, which the Phoenicians identified with their god Melqart, the patron god of Kition. Therefore, the archaeologists concluded that the sanctuary was dedicated to the city god of Kition, Heracles-Melqart.

Einar Gjerstad explains the reason why the temenos were never rebuilt as a consequence of the last king of Kition, Pumiatihon. Pumiatihon sided with Antigonus in the struggle between him and Ptolemy I Soter. He lost his life and throne which meant that Kition ceased to be an independent state after Ptolemy’s conquest of Kition in 312 B.C. and since the temple was the religious sign of the political independence of Kition it couldn't be rebuilt after the conquest.

=== Vouní spring 1928–autumn 1929 ===
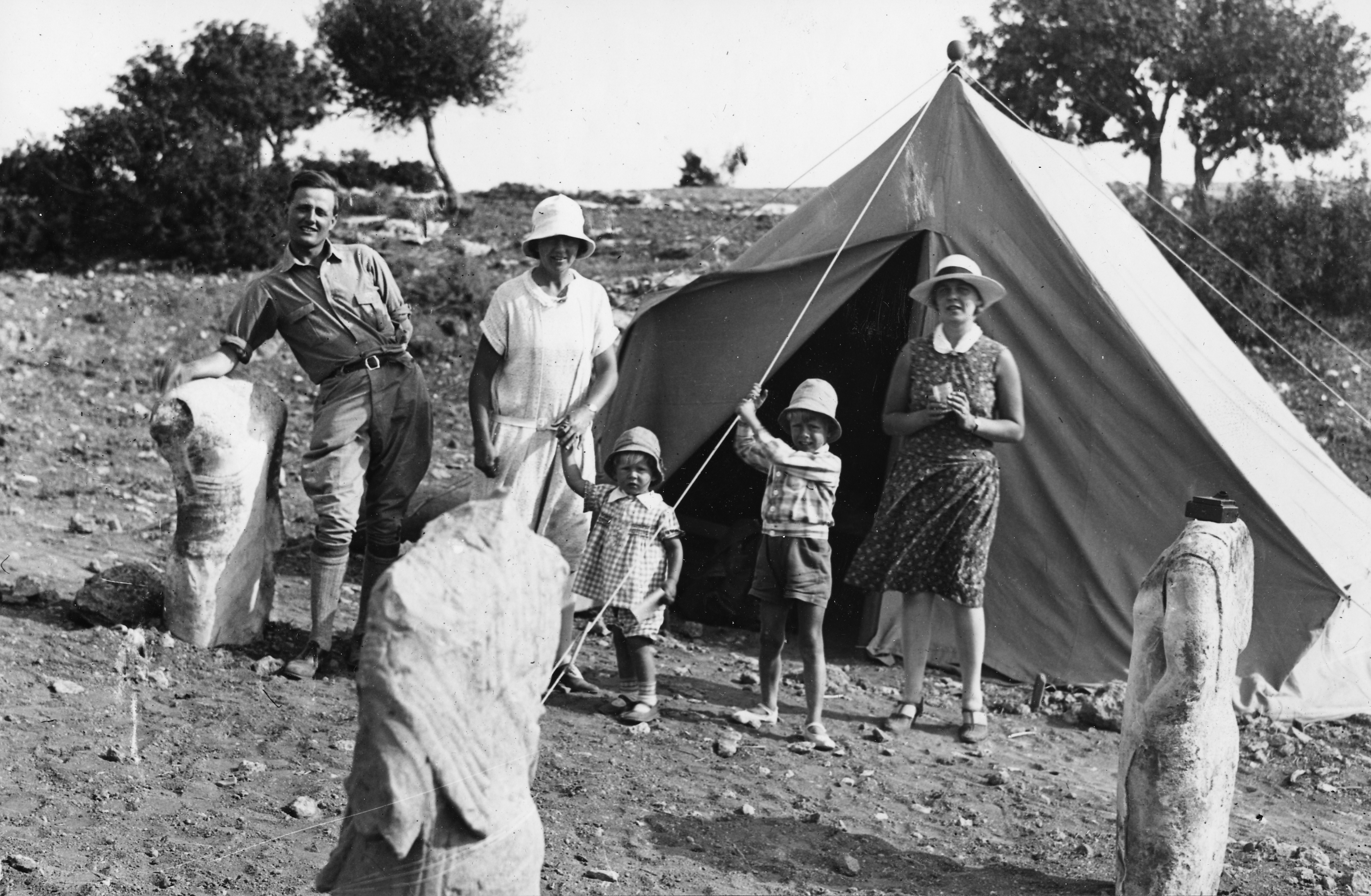
The Gjerstad family. Einar Gjerstad, Vivi Gjerstad and their children, as well as their nanny Gudrun Atterman outside the tents at Vouni.

The excavations at Vouni (the name means rock in modern greek) lasted from the spring of 1928 until the autumn of 1929. The site is well situated close to the sea, and with good communication to Marion and Limnitis for example. The ancient road from Soli to Mersinaki and Vouni can easily be traced. The hill was protected by defensive walls with several towers. On the top of the hill there is a temple dedicated to Athena. The Swedish Cyprus Expedition dismissed the theory that Vouni was the ancient Aipeia, the predecessor of Soloi/Soli, since the site did not reveal any earlier finds than the 5th century B.C. Therefore, the ancient name for the place now called Vouni is not known.

On the terrace below the temple, there is a palace surrounded by various minor sanctuaries. It does not seem like the palace was separated from the temple by a wall or any other construction. Below the palace, they found a strip-shaped necropolis with a few rock tombs. Most of these tombs were open and reminiscent of caves. Below the necropolis they found a rampart where houses similar to the palace were found. The people moved between the houses, the necropolis, and sanctuaries with the help of roads and stairs cut into the rock.

==== The Temple of Athena ====
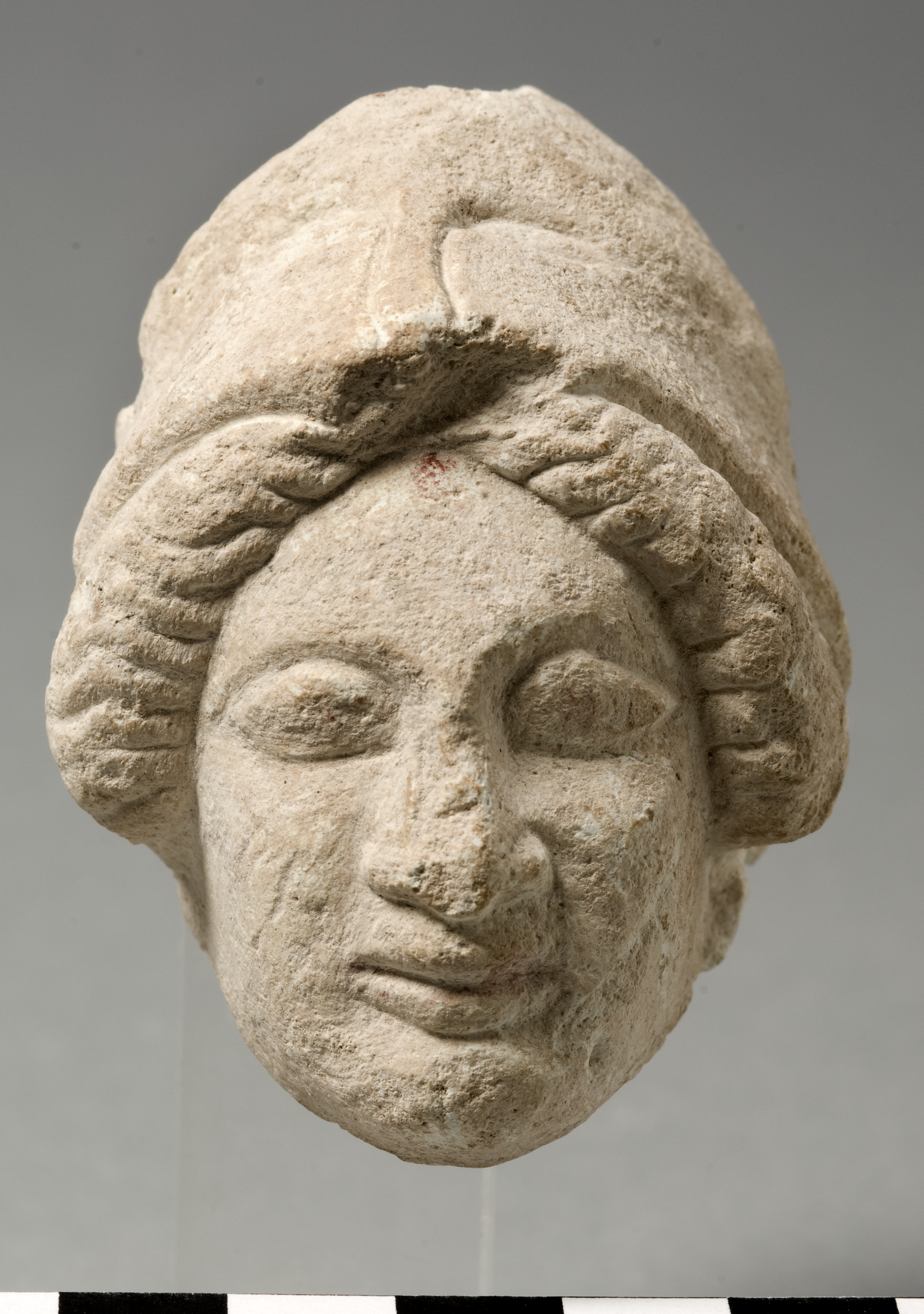
Athena head with a corinthian helmet. From Vouni ca. 475–325.

Since the temple’s ground has been exposed to weather and wind during the years, only the lowermost part of the walls was preserved. The architectural remains consist of foundation walls and floors of various constructions and compositions. Further, some bases for statues and altars were found. Many of the walls were erected on solid rock and the firm foundation that was made of ashlars kept together by gypsum mortar that needed to be created since the rock slopes towards the west.

The temple area’s architecture can be divided into three separate parts. The first one is a square building with one room, called room I. The second part called room II consists of walls 58 and creates a rectangular building. The third part consists of Rooms V–VII which create a block of houses built together. It is unclear if they were built during the same period. Between these buildings, there are some courtyards as well, as a kind of forecourt. One of the purposes of the courtyards seems to have been to set up sculptures and some altars. The sculptures represented Athena and were not placed in a specific order. It seems like most of them were placed in the center of the court just next to the entrance. According to the Swedish archaeologists the building with the rooms V–VII seems to have been used as a treasury for votive offerings or something similar.

Since the archaeologists found a bronze bowl with the name Athena inscribed on it, as well as bronze weapons and a lot of sculptures that probably represent the goddess they concluded that this was a temple to the goddess Athena. The sanctuary was created during the first half of the 5th century. After the middle of the century Room 1 was added. Nothing indicates when the whole temple site was destroyed or abandoned but there is no archaeological material found ascribed to a later period than the Cypro-Classic II period.

==== The Palace ====
As mentioned earlier, below the temple there is a building complex called the palace. The palace’s stone walls consist of the local limestone of the Vouni rock itself, as well as a light-green homogeneous limestone from Paradisotissa, 1.5 kilometers northwest of Vouni. It seems like the foundation was built of stone and then the upper walls of mud-brick, although some rooms are built entirely of stone.

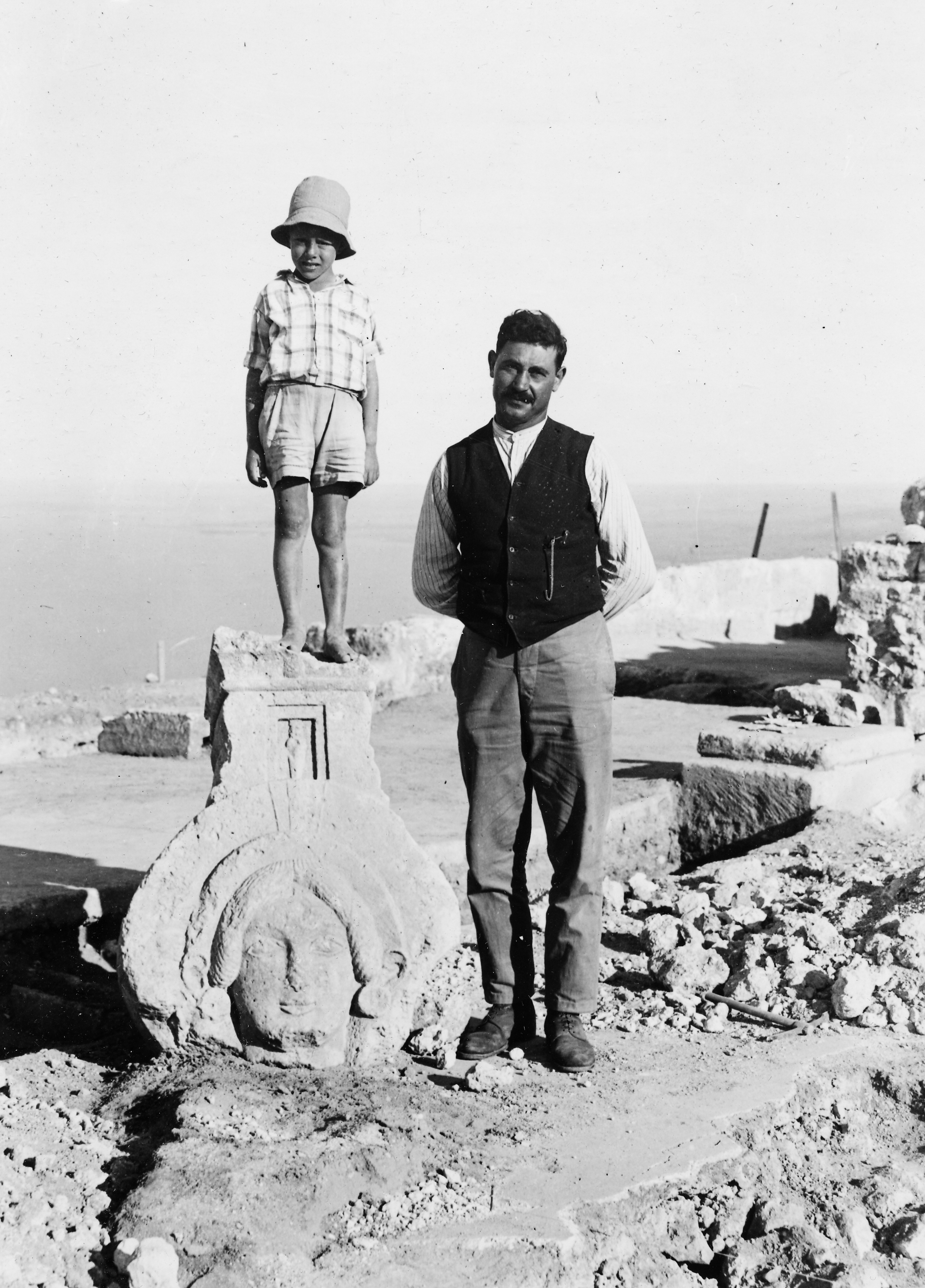
Martin Gjerstad, Lazaros and the column head no. 290. Vouni. Galini.

The palace courtyard had columns to support the roof of the peristyle around the central court as well as the other walls with open fronts. The preserved fragments of the columns are made of hard limestone of the Vouni rock with stylobates of rectangular slabs of Paradisotissa limestone. The columns are of two types. Type 1 has a cylindrical shaft meanwhile type 2 has the shape of an ellipse. One capital is preserved. This capital has the shape of a Cypriote variety of the Egyptian Hathor capital with a female head sculptured in relief on two sides. She wears rosette earrings and her head is crowned by an arch-shaped diadem. Above her head is a small edifice with an open gate on the façade and a niche with a uraeus in the middle.

The excavators found multiple stairs made of stone blocks that led both to the upper story and the ground floor of the palace. Some stairs were probably made of wood as well. A hearth used for cooking was found on the lower earth floor. The hearth was surrounded by a semicircle made of stones blackened by fire. Further, they found a layer of carbonized matter and ash.

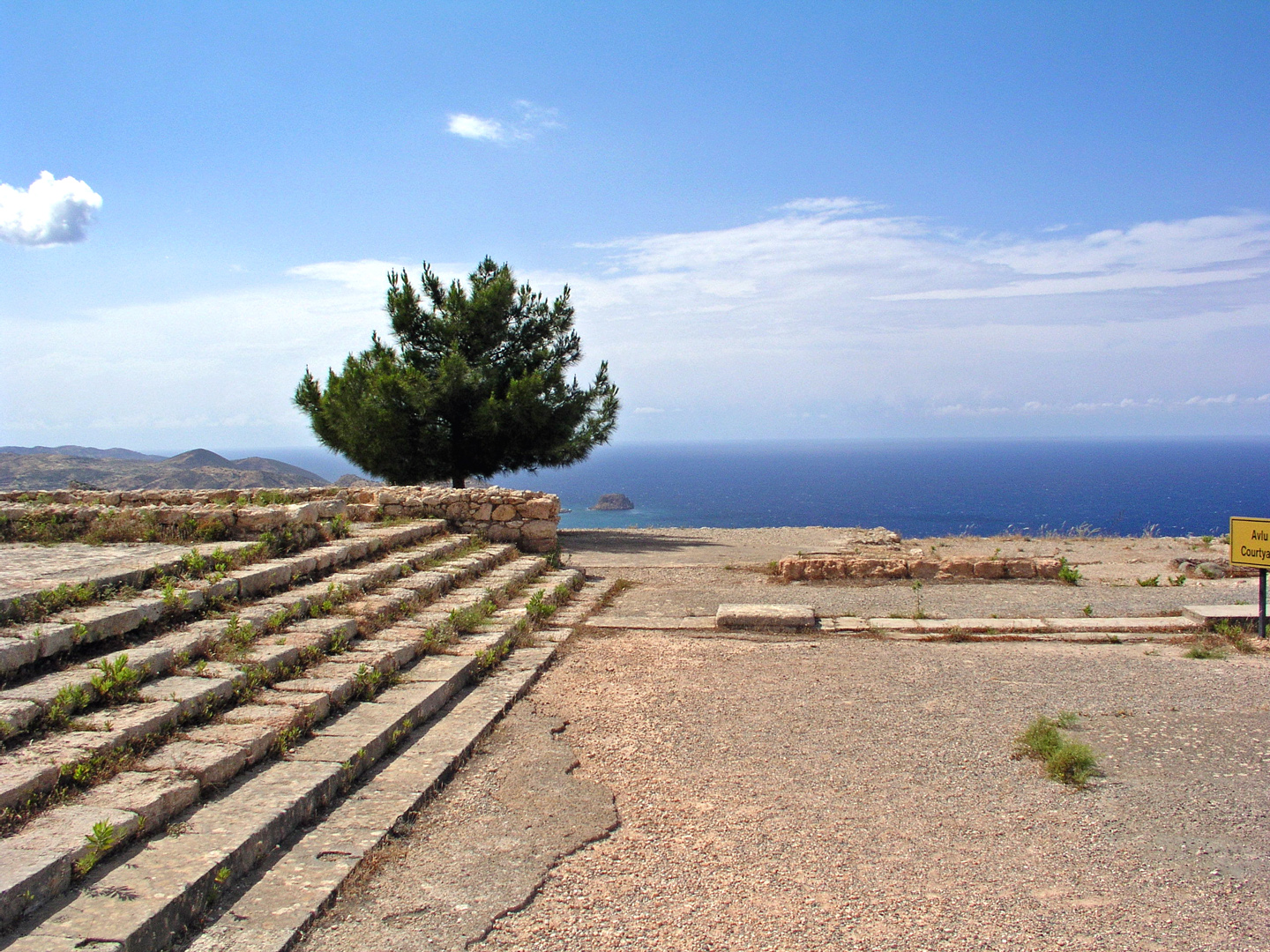
The large stairs of the Vouni palace.

The cisterns found here are of four main types: tank-shaped, well-shaped, bottle-shaped, and bell-shaped. The water was carried to cisterns in conduits of three different types: terracotta pipes, open cemented drains, and cemented drains covered by stone slabs. The first two were used to carry water from the roof meanwhile the cemented, covered drains were used for the conduits below the floors, which opened up into round cemented basins below the floors to the cisterns. The drainage channels carried the rainwater from the open spaces within and outside the palace to the washrooms and bathrooms, as well as the cisterns.

When The Swedish Cyprus expedition analyzed the palace they concluded that the palace was built in four periods. During the first period (500 to 450–440 B.C.) the main entrance was to the southwest, then the entrance opened up into the state apartments which consisted of a tripartite complex of rooms with a dominating principal room in the middle. The state apartments are placed next to the central court with a magnificent staircase of seven steps. The central court is almost square shaped and surrounded on three sides by a peristyle portico with a roof supported by columns, although the center of the court was open. Here, at the center of the court, a cistern was placed that collected rainwater. More rooms were built along the court which didn't connect directly with each other. Some of these rooms are bathrooms. The palace had a caldarium where the bathers could be oiled and rubbed and then washed in hot water. After the caldarium, they could continue to the frigidarium where they washed in cold water. The kitchen department consists of small rooms southeast by another open court. Some of the rooms to the northwest are living rooms and storerooms. In two of the storerooms, conical holes are cut into the floor to support large pithoi with pointed bases. The palace of the first period did not have an upper story. Outside the palace, a temenos was constructed with a rectangular altar court as well as some small cult houses. In one of the cult houses the majority of the sculptures were fragments of Heracles figures, therefore the archeologists called it “Chapel of Herakles”.

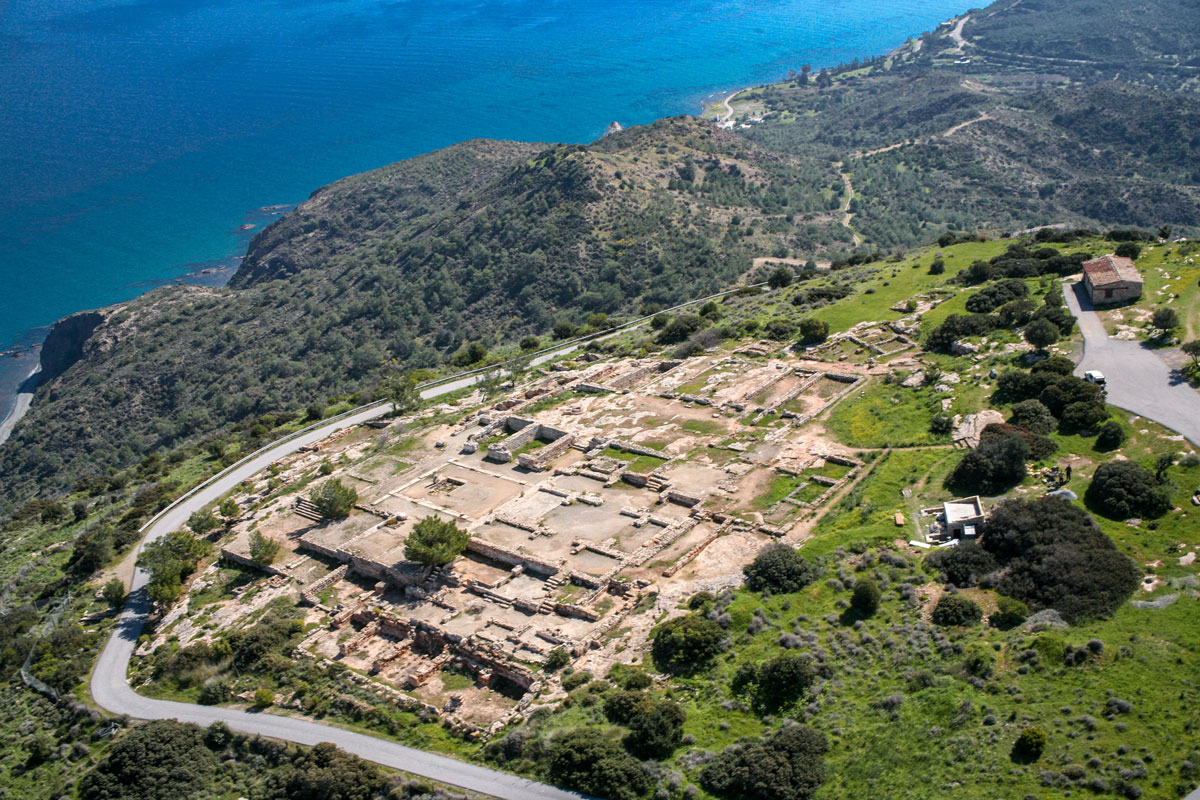
The Vouni palace.

In the second period (500 to 450–440 B.C), a rectangular room and a narrow corridor were added. Here, inside the wall, the archaeologists found four small boxes built of ashlar blocks as well as ash and carbonized matter and signs of smoke on the blocks, which indicates that the boxes were used for firing in some way. They interpreted this structure as a heating room for the room above, which creates something like a sudatorium. One cult-house was added to the south of the palace. Otherwise, the structure stayed the same as in period 1.

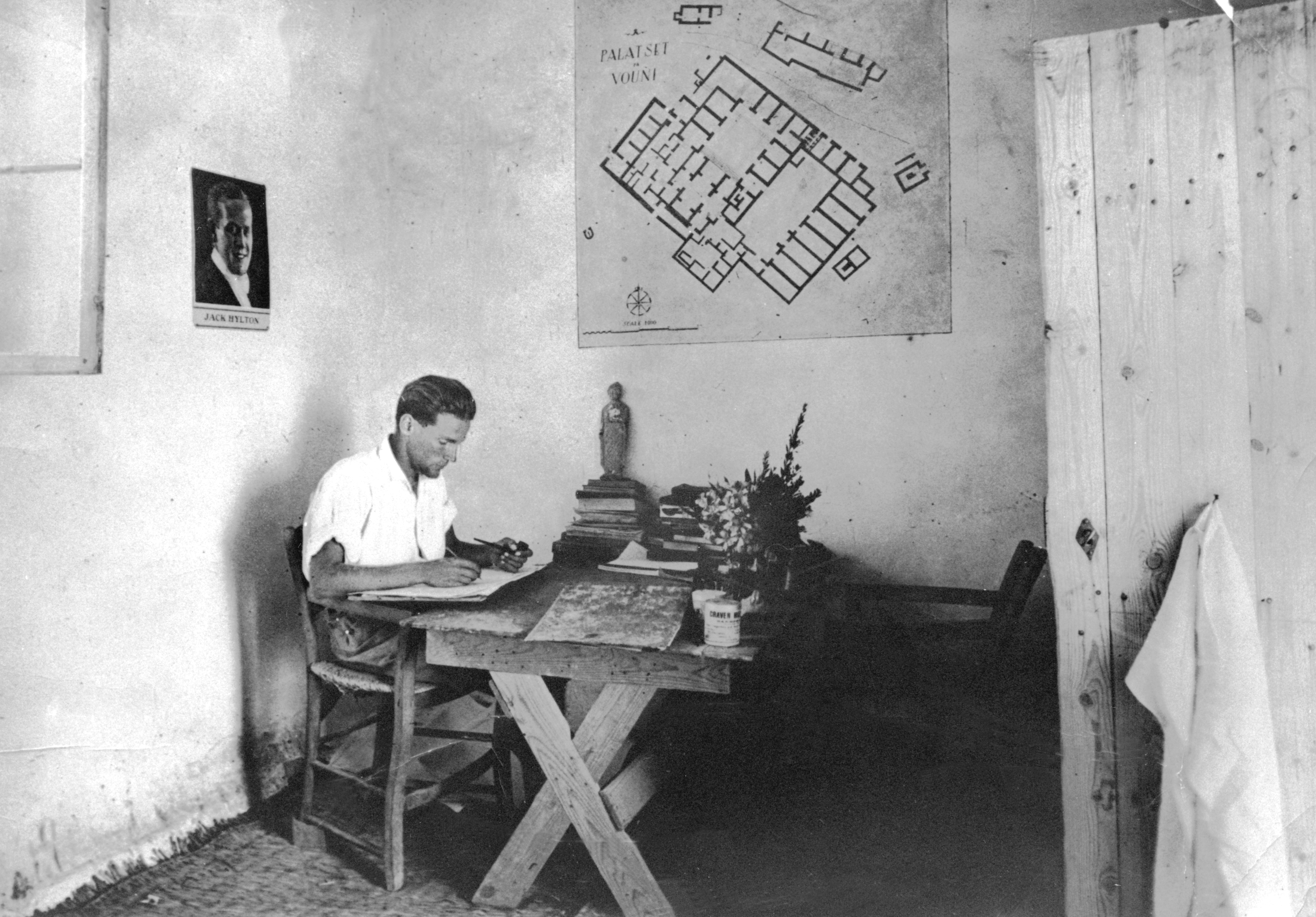
Alfred Westholm at his desk with a map of the Vouni palace on the wall.

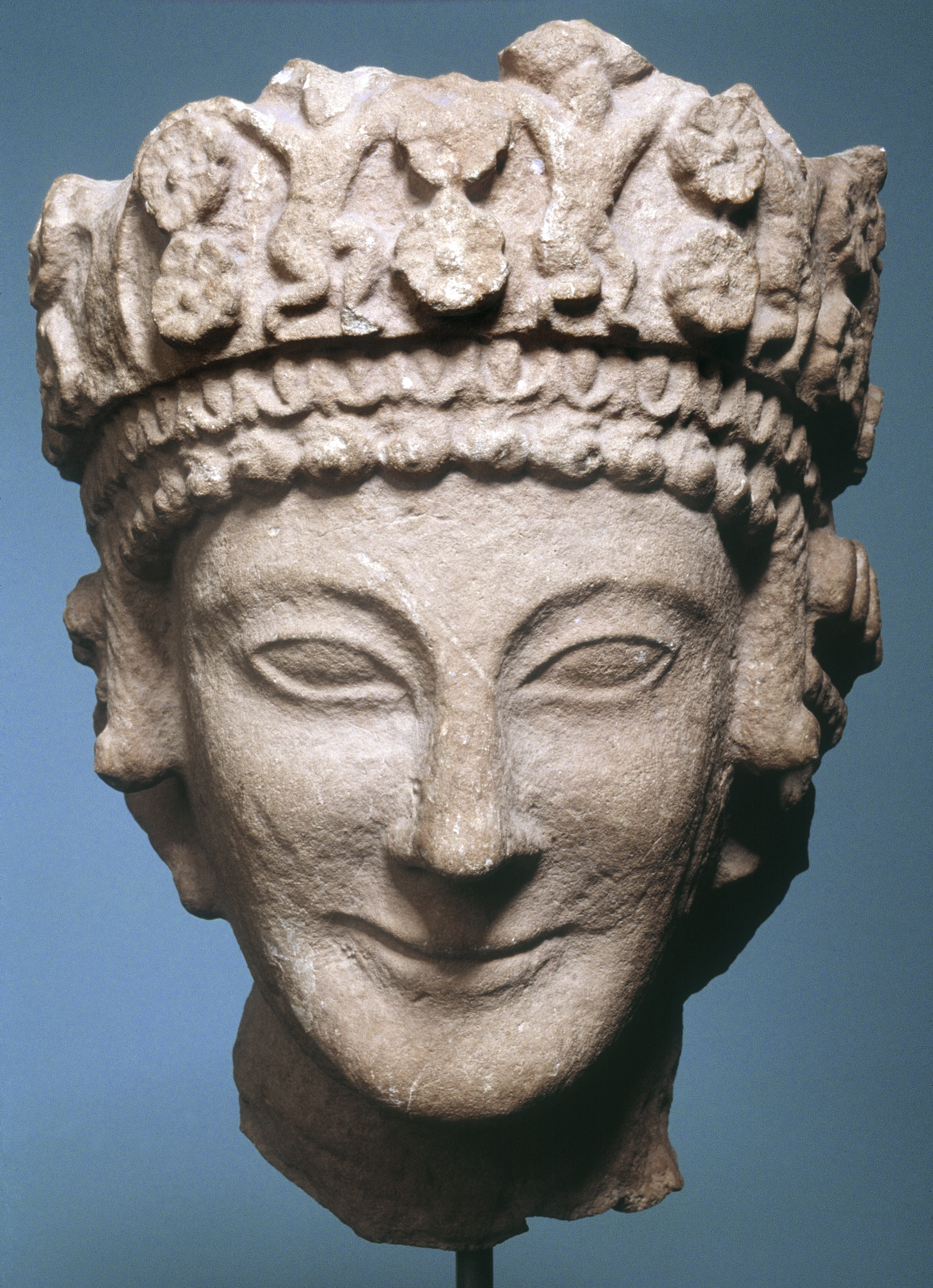
The Vouni head wearing a high diadem/kalathos with dancing figures alternating with double rosettes. Can be seen at Medelhavsmuseet.

Throughout the third period (450–440 to 380 B.C.), the archaeologists concluded that an upper story was added to the palace, and therefore a lot of stairs needed to be added as well. Four new store-rooms were added as well as three more fire chambers. Some of the old parts were rebuilt, the court, for example, was enlarged to almost twice as large as the central court. Furthermore, the kitchen department underwent some enlargements and alterations. A new main entrance with a large and angular vestibule was built by the north corner of the place. With all the changes around the state apartments, their meaning probably changed. During this period they are reminiscent of a megaron. Overall structure of the palace changed a lot during this period compared to how the palace appeared in period 1. Additionally, the religious buildings outside the palace evolved and new buildings were added as well. During the fourth and last period (450–440 to 380 B.C.), only minor changes were made at the palace and the temenos.

A lot of stone sculptures have been found at the Vouni Palace or close to it. For example, the famous Vouni head, crowned by a diadem decorated with relief ornaments representing rosettes and dancing figures, as well as a border of kymation ornaments, was found at Vouni. Another example is the life-size Kore statue which imitates the Ionian-Greek art style. She stands with her left leg advanced, dressed in a chiton and a mantle, the left hand, which is missing, probably held some of the folds. The statue is from the end of the archaic style. Terracotta sculptures were found here as well. Further, earrings and other jewelry were found, as well as pottery, bowls, jugs, a spindle whorl and loom weight, and an incense burner.

=== Petra tou Limniti, 1929 ===
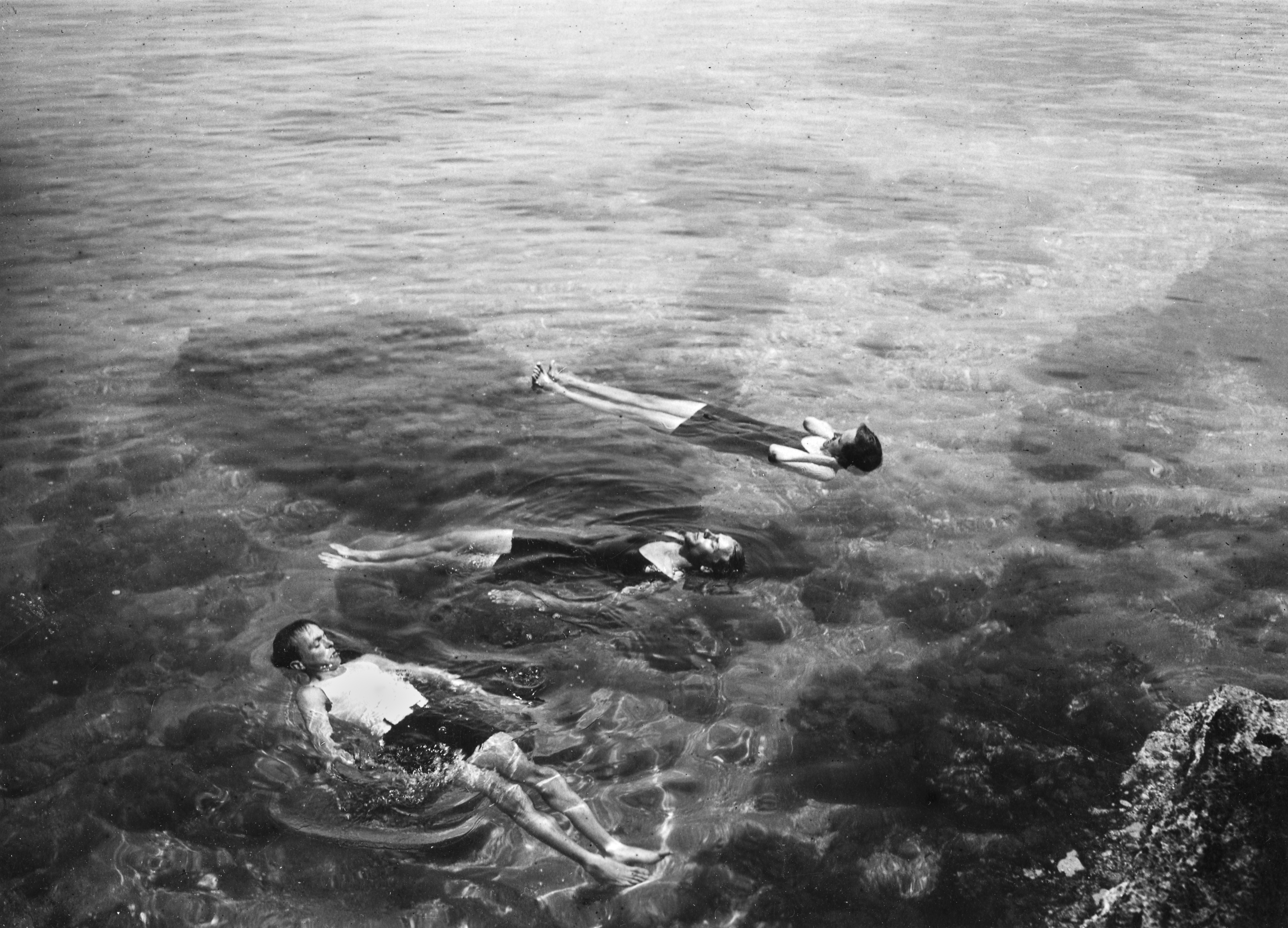
The archaeologists floating. Erik Sjöqvist, Alfred Westholm and Einar Gjerstad.

In the heat, during the excavation at Vouni Palace 1929, the Swedes took a swim during their lunch break to the small rocky island of Petra (the name means rock) near the coast. By chance, they discovered the important site of Petra tou Limniti. Here, on the surface of the island’s top, cultural deposits from the Stone Age such as flint and fragments of stone bowls were found. Because of this, the Swedish archaeologists decided to commence an excavation on the small island. They excavated one of the oldest settlements from Cyprus, with huts from the pre-Neolithic period. Four building periods were identified and named Petra I, II, III, IV, dated to 7000–5500 B.C.

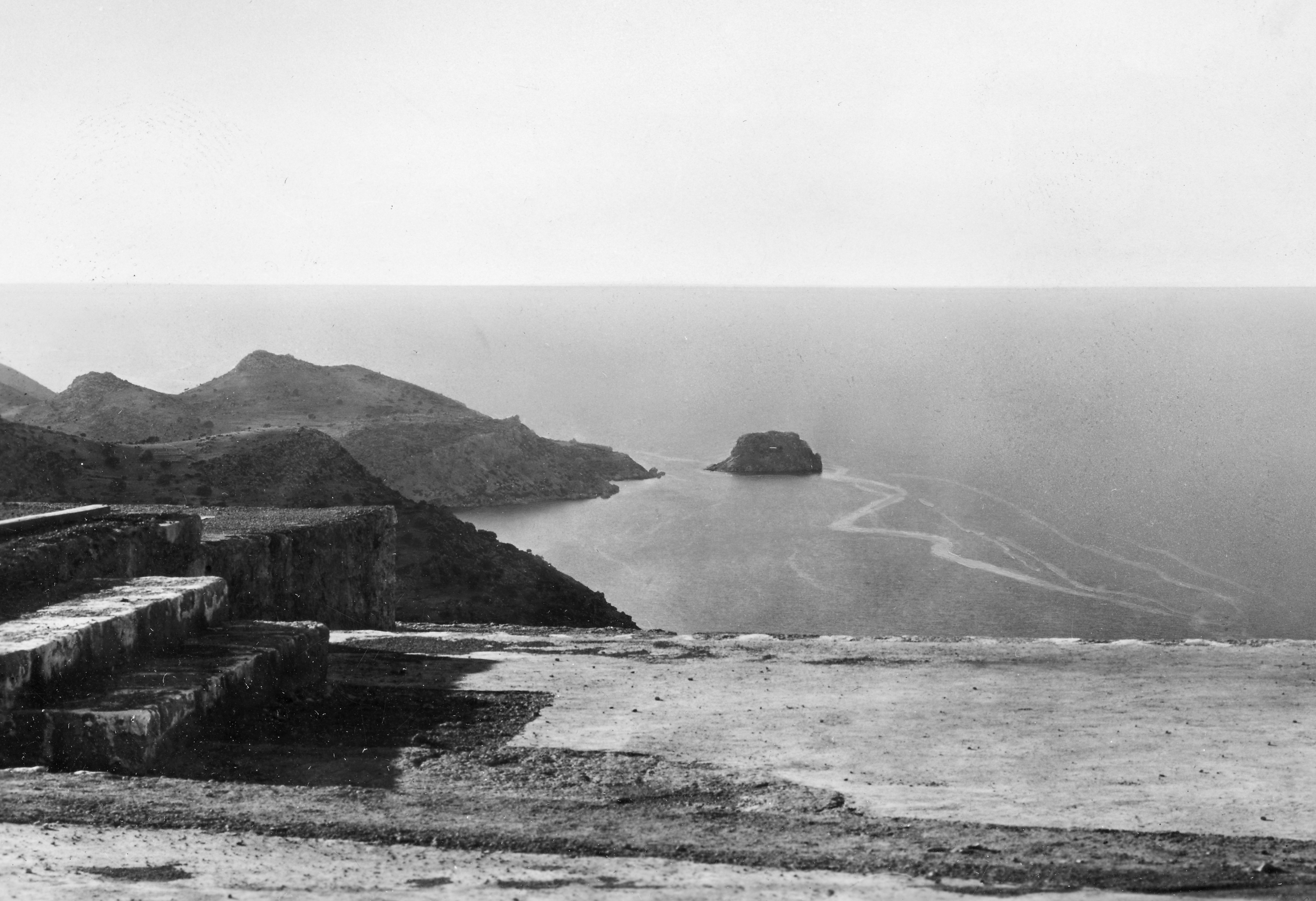
View of Petra Tou Limniti from the Vouni Palace.

During Petra I, the ancient people used the natural cavity of the rock to construct a hut. Not much remains of this hut, only a group of rough stones and a culture stratum of dark, sandy earth mixed with ash and carbonized matter. The ash and carbonized matter could be all that is left of the hut’s straw and brushwood walls. During Petra II, two new huts were built. Since the cavity was full of the debris from the first hut the cavity could not be used for the new huts. The huts did not have any built floor or stone foundations for the walls.

After the second fire, Petra III commences. A new, bigger hut with two rooms and straight walls is built. The living room is oblong with straight sides and rounded corners. Now the floor is built of a compressed layer of mud and the house's foundation consists of stones. The kitchen has a hearth placed against the west wall of the room. The hearth consists of large stones placed in a circle. Otherwise, the kitchen has the same structure as the living room. According to the archaeologists, there was a door between the two rooms. During Petra IV an oval hut replaced the kitchen from Petra III since it burned down. Both of the rooms received new floors made of pebbles and gravel.

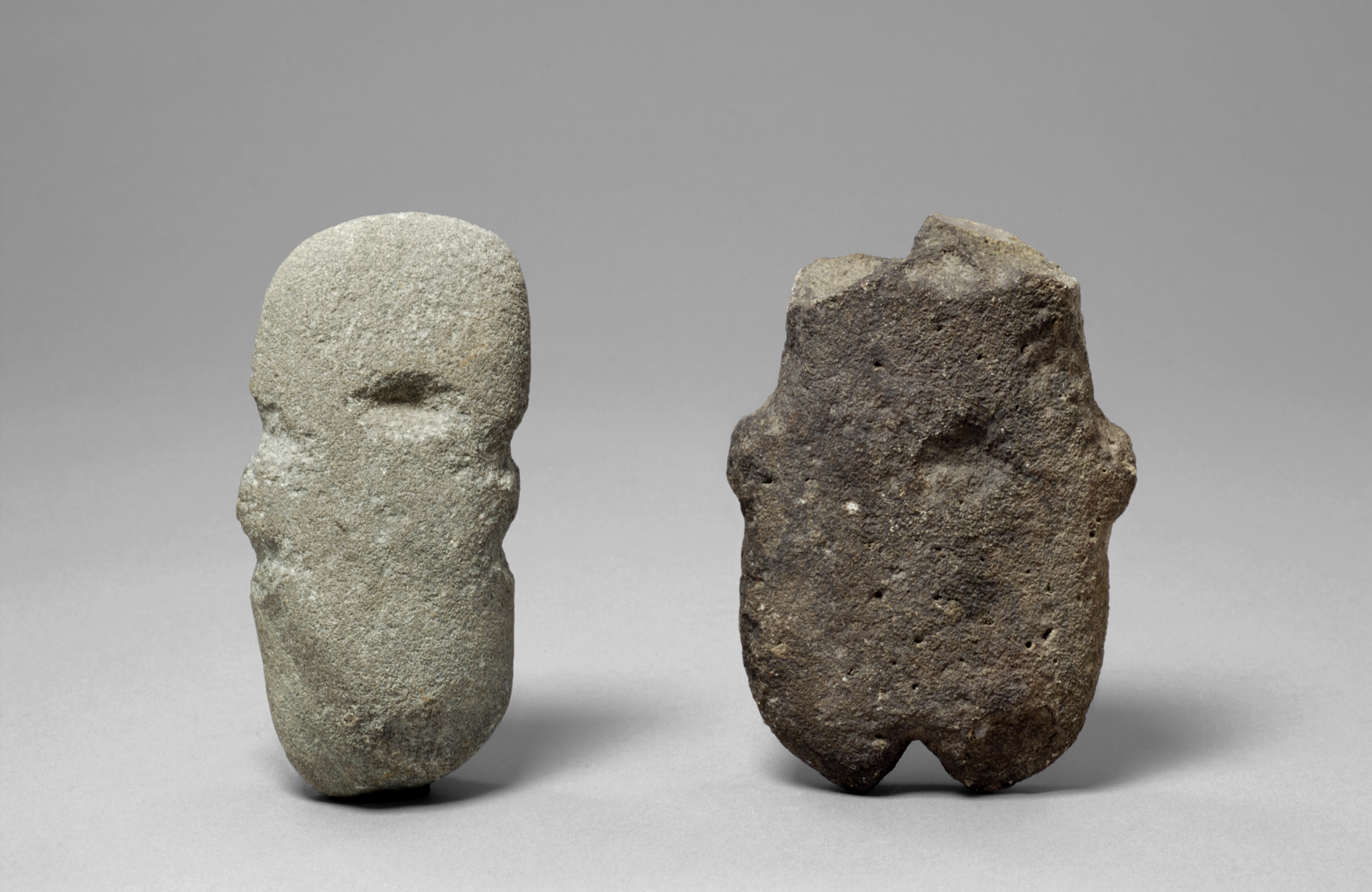
Two stone idols from Petra tou Limniti. ca. 6000 B.C. Can be seen at Medelhavsmuseet.

Bones of swine, sheep, and cattle as well as fish bones could be identified among the mass of animal bones found at Petra. The flint found here is of different kinds and was made into different objects such as scrapers, knives, and chisels. A thin knife of obsidian was also found. The stone objects consist of chisels, axe heads, spindle whirls, bowls, beads, and idols/figurines.

The island was never inhabited again after Petra IV. Therefore, all the periods only amount to about 40–50 years of habitation. The Swedish Expedition proposed that the reason for this could be that in the earlier periods, the cavity functioned as a shelter from the wind, but the more the debris grew the less sheltered the place became. Therefore, the island needed to be abandoned.

=== Mersinaki ===
Another site the Swedish Cyprus Expedition excavated was Mersinaki which is located near the shore, between Vouni and Soli. In prehistoric times there might have been a bay of sea where the fertile fields are today. At Mersinaki they found an open-air sanctuary by a river delta. Here they found a lot of sculptures, for example, the large terracotta sculptures of bearded male figures, now visible at Medelhavsmuseet in Stockholm. These are interpreted as votive gifts to the god Apollon. The sanctuary might have been dedicated to Apollon since two inscriptions mention him, but another inscription mentions Athena as well. The custom of founding sanctuaries in deltas or estuaries where freshwater and saltwater emerge is seen both at Phoenician and Greek sanctuaries.

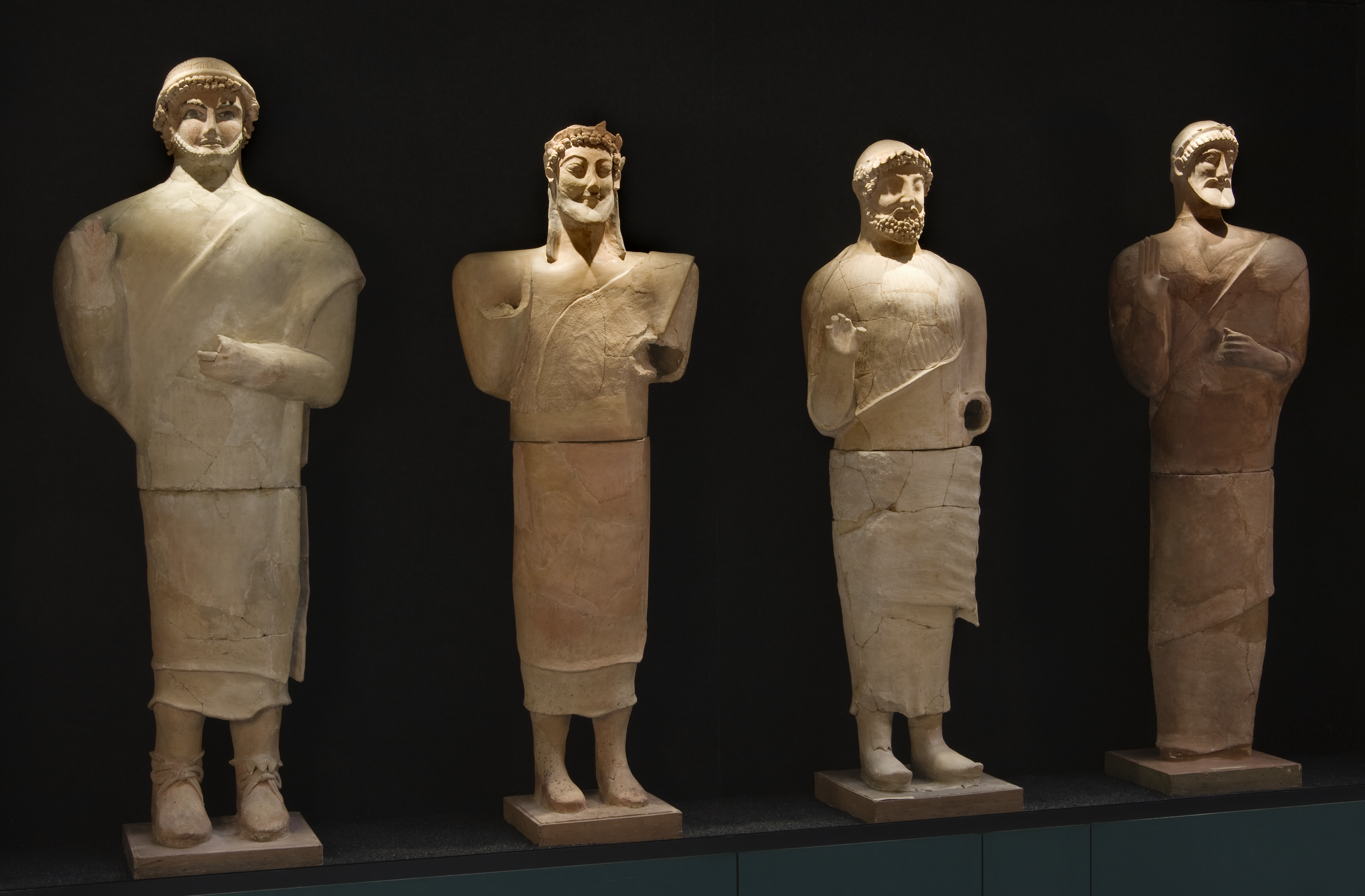
Four terracotta sculptures from Mersinaki. Can be seen at Medelhavsmuseet.

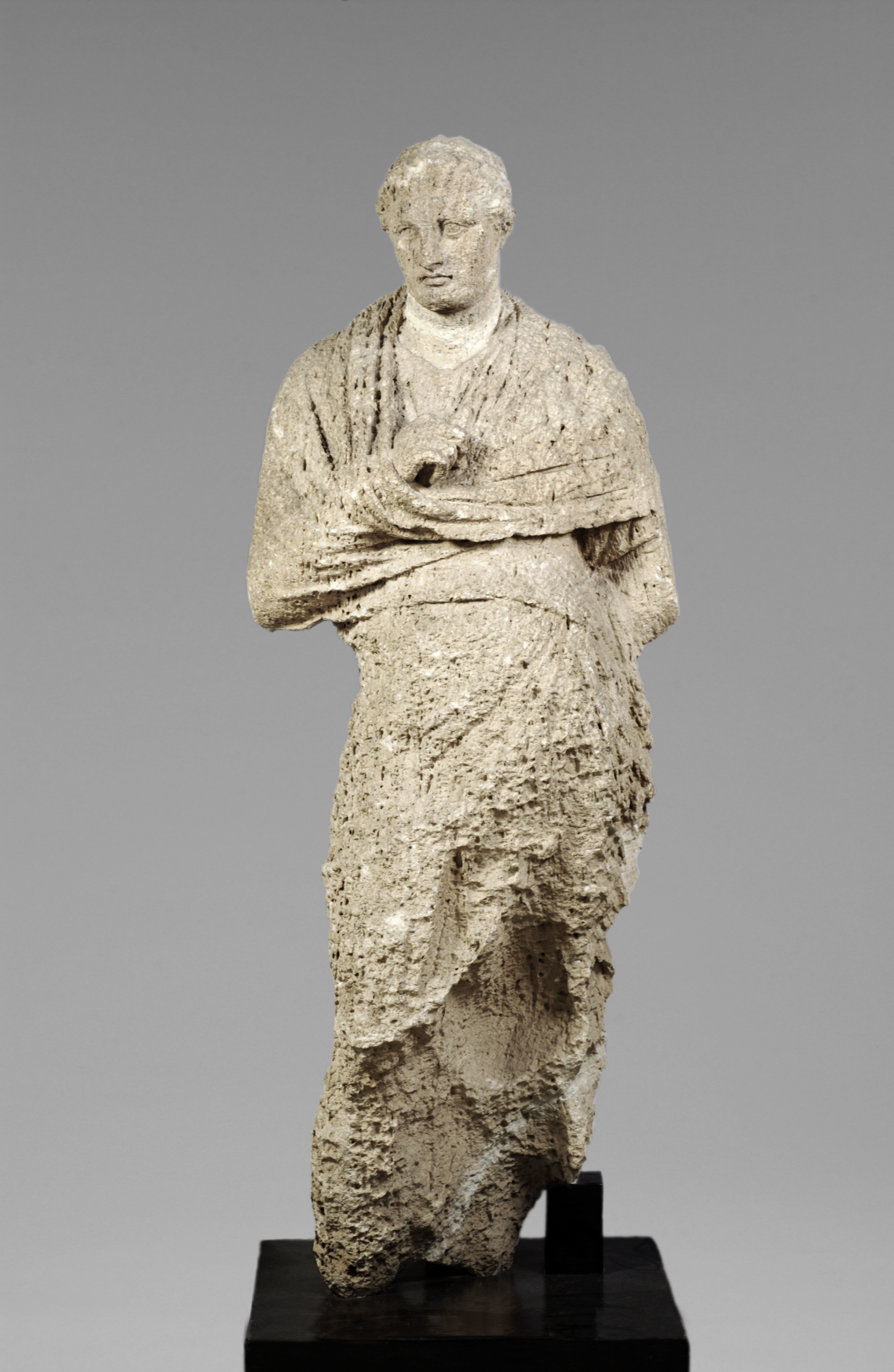
Lifesize male sculpture of limestone wearing a chiton. ca. 325–50 B.C. From Mersinaki. Can be seen at Medelhavsmuseet.

The excavation began with one trench and when the archaeologists realized that statues of terracotta and stone were probably buried here, they decided to do a large-scale excavation at the site of Mersinaki. The archaeologists found few architectural remains. The remains they found can be divided into two separate buildings or building systems. The first one consists only of fragments and small rubble walls, therefore, the shape of the building is difficult to decide. The second building system was found in a much better state of preservation. These walls create a rectangular room. Two different stratification layers were distinguished. One of them had no traces of pottery, fragments of sculptures, or similar objects. These layers existed before the place was used for sacred purposes. They recognized that some pits of various shapes and sizes had been dug from the same level. Inside the pits found traces of sculptures made of stone and terracotta, as well as some pottery. The pits were also filled with sandy, dark layers of earth. The archeologists concluded that the statues had a connection with the building and that the pits were dug along the borders of the temenos.

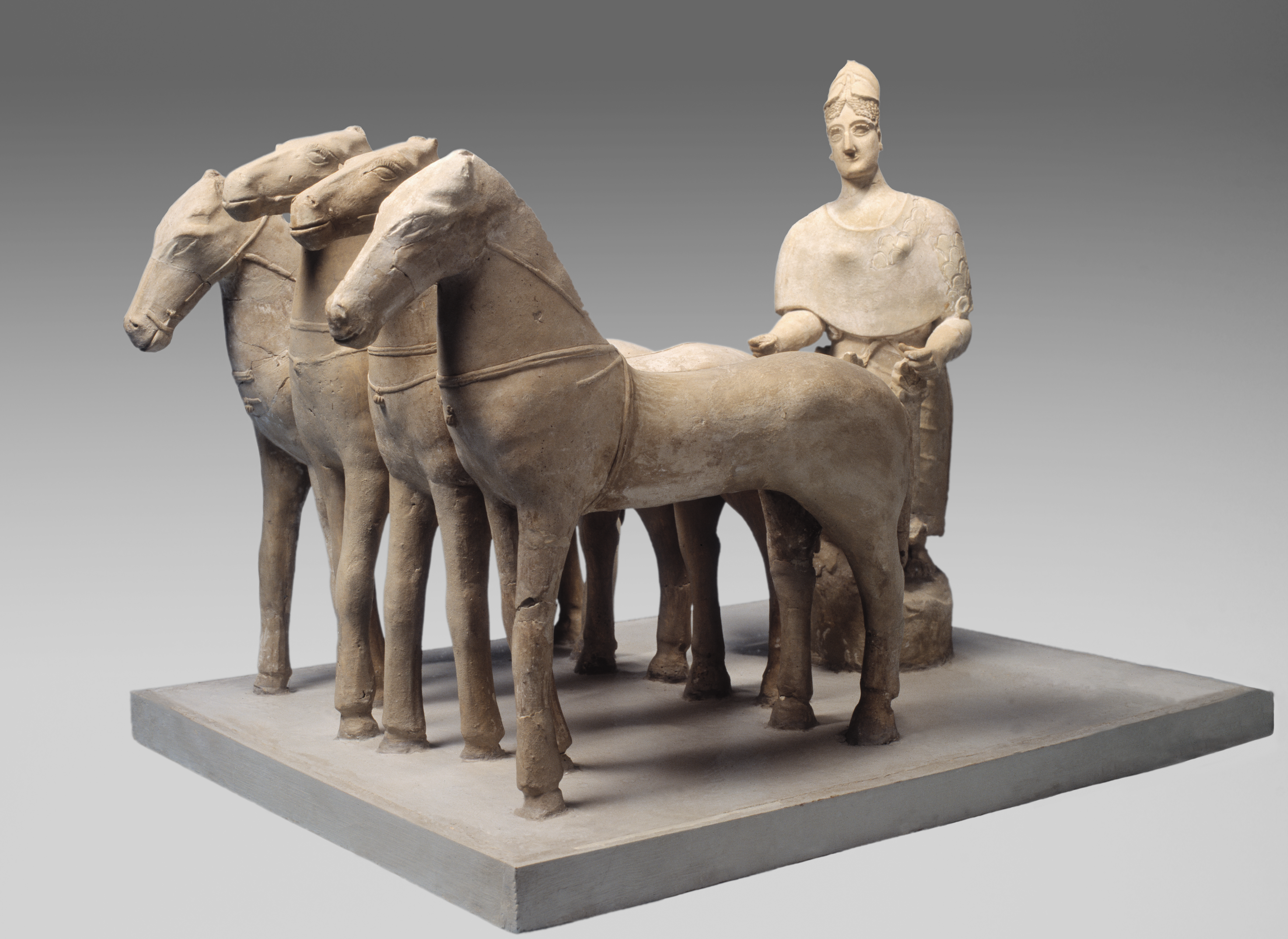
The goddess Athena mounted on a chariot drawn by four horses. ca. 600–400 B.C. From Mersinaki. Can be seen at Medelhavsmuseet.

The terracotta sculptures are difficult to classify since they are very monotonous in shape. The archaeologists thought that at least some of the molds were not of Cypriote origin but with a Greek expression. They proposed the idea that heads made in foreign molds were placed on bodies made in the local Cypriote type. Sometimes the heads could be altered. Therefore, the result was a hybrid style with a Cypriote body and a Greek head. Minor terracotta plastics were found as well, these usually depict a chariot group similar to the ones found at Agia Eirini. One of these groups depicts Athena. The sculptures are dated between Cypro-Archaic II and Cypro-Classic I, until the Cypro-Hellenistic period.

The stone sculptures are made of a similar soft limestone as was used in Vouni. Some were made of a harder stone that was reminiscent of the stone found at Poros. Few of the sculptures were completely preserved, but the ones that were are very characteristic. The sculptures made from hard limestone differ from the softer ones both in style and technique. According to the archaeologists, the harder ones are more influenced by the Greek-Hellenistic styles meanwhile the softer ones are more connected to the local Cypriote styles and show a degeneration of the Cypro-Archaic styles.

Later the site was destroyed. The pieces of the sculptures were scattered about all over the ground but not removed far from the place. In Roman times the indistinct house was constructed close to the old temple site but on a higher level. After this house was destroyed the site was abandoned entirely and there are no signs of the place being used after this period.

=== Soli October 1927 ===
==== Soli ====
The ancient town of Soli was located on the Mesaoria plain which was a well-situated place, close to the sea and harbor in the north as well as cultivated plains to the east and Cyprus' richest copper district to the south. The very top plateau was surrounded by a strong wall of similar construction to the city wall. The entrance was probably to the north side. Within this area, the foundation of a temple (templum in antis) was found. The archaeologist's conclusions about this temple are very conjectural. The Acropolis Hill was probably the first to be inhabited. When the town grew larger the area between the hill and the sea was inhabited. The buildings were often repaired and rebuilt. The town of Soli has changed from time to time. The earliest potsherds are from the Cypro-Archaic periods but they are very few in comparison with the Cypro-Hellenistic and Cypro-Roman sherds.

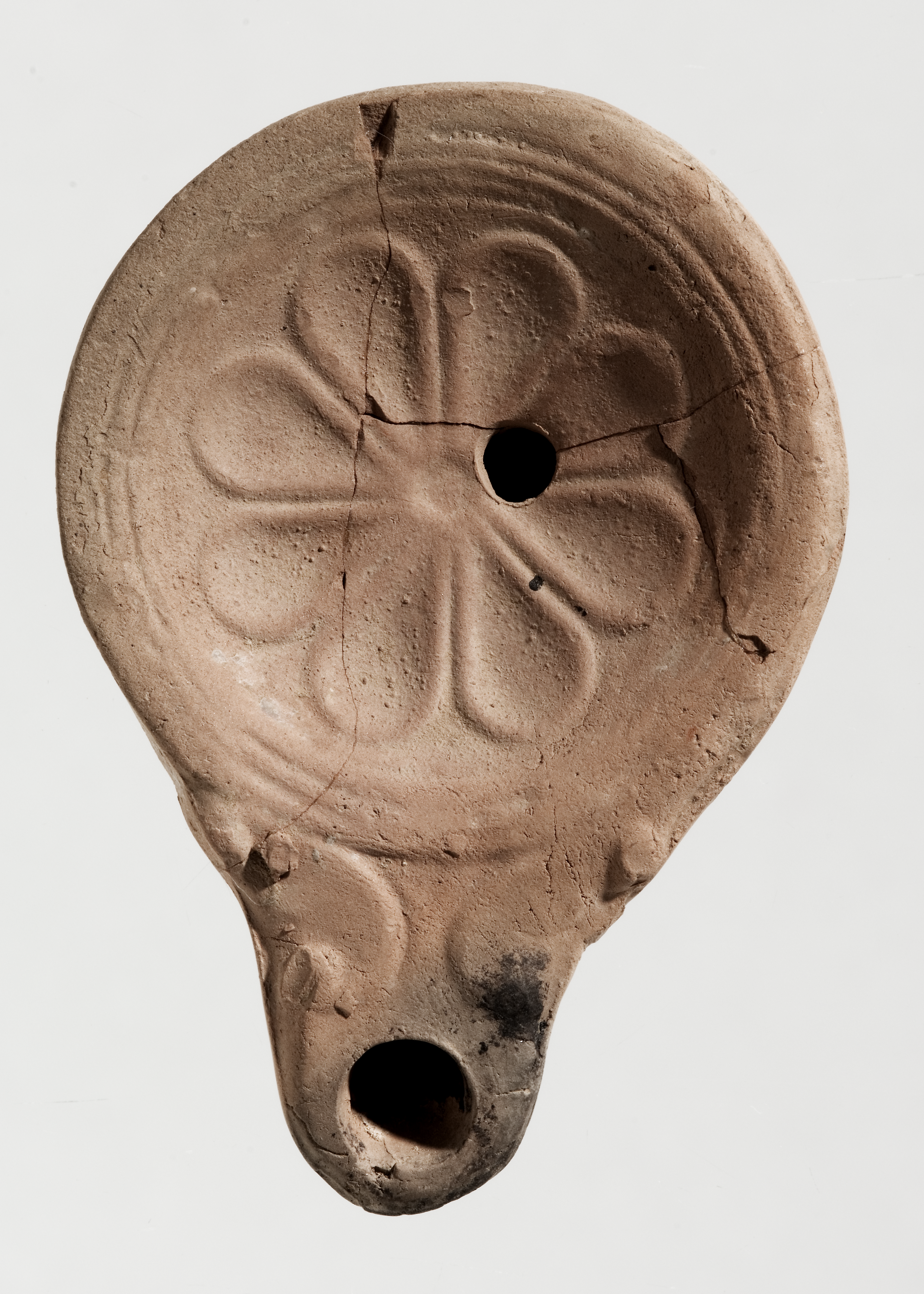
Molded Roman lamp from Soli, ca. 50 BC-150 AD.

The necropolis of Soli is spread over an enormous area around the town. Thousands of the tombs had already been opened by modern tomb robbers and were therefore destroyed. The sherds from the robbed tombs make it possible to date them and most of them are from the Cypro-Archaic II period to the Cypro-Roman.

Soli was one of the ancient kingdoms in Cyprus and is mentioned several times in the ancient literature although the authors portray the stories differently. One version describes how the name Soli is connected with the Athenian lawgiver Solon’s visit to Cyprus. He advised the king of Aipeia, Philocyprus, to move the city down to the plain. The king followed his advice and named the new settlement after his friend, therefore the town is called Soli. According to Strabo however, the city was founded by two Athenians, Phalerus, sometimes called the grandson of Erechteus, and Akamas. Furthermore, Soli is mentioned in the list of cities of Esarhaddon (681–668 B.C.) and Ashurbanipal (668–628 B.C.). Literary sources also mention a temple dedicated to Aphrodite and Isis which led the archaeologists to search for this temple.

==== The Temples at Cholades ====
According to the excavators many of the walls at Cholades were made of reused material, spolia, found in the river below the sites. Sometimes even pieces of broken statues were reused in the walls. Several walls had been decorated with mural paintings, most of them were found on fragments of stucco, fallen to the floors close to the walls. In one room the paintings were better preserved, and the pattern could be studied. The other rooms seem to have had walls decorated with vertical and horizontal lines in red, blue, black, and green creating large squares. One room had fragments with wide red bands as well.

Naked marble sculpture probably depicting Aphrodite. Cypro-Hellenistic, IB. Found at Soli/Soloi. This sculpture can be found at the Cyprus Museum, Nicosia.

They also found water conduits, cisterns, stairs and altars. All the buildings create a temple complex consisting of different temples numbered from A to F. The temples were altered, changed, and rebuilt during four periods. Material from the temples displays a particularly rich material of sculptures made of marble and limestone. According to the archeologists temples A and B were conjointly dedicated to Aphrodite and Cybele. One or possibly both of temples C and D were sacred to Isis and temple E to Serapis Canopus and Eros. Temple F was dedicated to Mithras. During the first period, there was a loose connection between the cella and the irregular courtyards in front of it. In period 2 (temple B, C, and D) the shape is still irregular although the connection between the cella and courtyards is beginning to get closer. In the third period, temple E was reconstructed with the cellae and courtyards built together as a closed unit and it seems like the importance of symmetry improves. In period 4 are some courtyards roofed with several closed chapels. The temples date from the Cypro-Hellenistic period and the Roman times.

From the Swedish Cyprus Expedition's excavation at Soli Cholades. Construction of temples C–F.

The marble sculptures found during the excavation were probably made from imported marble. It seems likely that the heads were made separately from the body and fitted together with an iron pin. Some sculptures have been mended. All the sculptures were once painted although the colours are faintly preserved. Other sculptures were made of alabaster, terracotta as well as soft and hard limestone. Some of the sculptures were found in situ and these were always located in connection to the cellae. The archeologists proposed that they probably were placed on the altars in the cellae. Therefore the altars might have been used as iconostasis, or a stand for the various sculptures. This was only observed with the sculptures in the cella, not the ones from the courtyards or outside. The sculptures from period 1 (250 B.C.) were all found in temple A. From period 2 (end of 2nd century B.C.) all the sculptures were found at temples B, C, and D. From period 3 (middle of 3rd century A.D.) and 4 (beginning of 4th century A.D.) all the sculptures were found in temple E. The sculptures and inscriptions were used as the foundation for the archaeologist's identifications of the temples, therefore they might be the correct identification but it is not completely sure.

==== The Theatre ====
A reconstruction of the theatre at Soli during the Roman period by John Lindros.

Further on the Swedish Cyprus Expedition excavated an ancient theatre at Soli. They proposed that the theatre was planned and erected in one piece and they could not distinguish any building periods. The structure displays that the theatre is from the Roman period and coins exhibit an even more precise date, 42/3 A.D as well as 66-70 A.D. It seems to have been in use until the fourth century. The theatre consists of three parts, orchestra, auditorium, and stage-building. The orchestra is cut out of the rock and has a semicircular shape with a rectangular addition in front. The floor of the orchestra was plastered with lime cement and the rainwater was carried off by a conduit of terracotta pipes. Two entrances, the western and eastern paradoi, lead to the orchestra. The auditorium was also semicircular and cut into the rock of the sloping hill. The auditorium is divided by a diazoma covered by limestone slabs.
