= 1985 in association football =

The following are the association football events of the year 1985 throughout the world.

== Events ==
- February 27 – Leo Beenhakker makes his debut as the manager of Dutch national team with a 7–1 win over Cyprus in Amsterdam, with two goals each from Dick Schoenaker and Wim Kieft.
- March 28 – The North American Soccer League announces that it will suspend operations for the 1985 season.
- May 11 – Wealdstone F.C. become the first winners of the Non-League Double (Gola League & F.A. Trophy), defeating Boston United 2–1 at Wembley Stadium.
- May 11– 56 spectators die in a fire at Valley Parade in a match between Bradford City and Lincoln City.
- May 15 – Everton F.C. won their first European Cup Winners' Cup after defeating SK Rapid Wien of Austria 3–1 in the final at the Feijenoord Stadion in Rotterdam after goals from Andy Gray, Trevor Steven and Kevin Sheedy in the 58th, 72nd and 85th minutes respectively. Hans Krankl got the consolation goal for SK Rapid Wien in the 84th minute.
- May 29 – 39 spectators die at the Heysel Stadium disaster at the final of the European Cup between Juventus FC and Liverpool F.C. The Old Lady became the first club in the history of European football to have won all three major UEFA competitions after defeating the English team.
- June 6 – Following the Heysel Stadium disaster FIFA ban English clubs from competing in worldwide competitive matches for five years (ten years for Liverpool, later reduced to six).
- Copa Libertadores 1985: Won by Argentinos Juniors after defeating América de Cali 5–4 on a penalty shootout after a final aggregate score of 1-1.
- September 10 – Jock Stein, the manager of the Scotland team, dies at the end of the World Cup Qualifier against Wales at Ninian Park in Cardiff.
- December 8 – Italy's Juventus FC wins the Intercontinental Cup in Tokyo, Japan by defeating Argentina's Argentinos Juniors on penalties (4–2), after the match ended in 2-2. The Torinese side become the first—and remained the only until 2022—team in the world to have won all possible official continental competitions and the world title.

== Winners club national championship ==
=== Asia ===
- Qatar – Al-Arabi

=== Europe ===
- Belgium – R.S.C. Anderlecht
- Denmark – Brøndby IF
- England – Everton F.C.
- Finland – HJK
- France – FC Girondins de Bordeaux
- Italy – Hellas Verona
- Netherlands – Ajax Amsterdam
- Norway – Rosenborg BK
- Portugal – F.C. Porto
- Scotland – Aberdeen F.C.
- Spain – FC Barcelona
- Turkey – Fenerbahçe
- West Germany – Bayern Munich

=== North America ===
- Canada – London Marconi (NSL)
- Mexico – Club América
- United States
  - South Florida Sun (USL)
  - San Jose Earthquakes (WACS)

=== South America ===
- Argentina
  - Nacional – Argentinos Juniors
- Bolivia – Bolívar
- Brazil – Coritiba
- Colombia – América de Cali
- Paraguay – Olimpia Asunción

== Births ==
=== January ===
- January 3 – Angelo Vega Rodriguez, Chilean-born Swedish footballer
- January 4 – Gökhan Gönül, Turkish footballer
- January 5 – Diego Vera, Uruguayan striker
- January 9
  - Mohamed Haggag, Egyptian professional footballer
  - Juanfran, Spanish footballer
- January 11 – Ignacio Quirino, Uruguayan footballer
- January 14 – Antonijo Pranjič, Slovenian footballer
- January 19 –
  - Mohamed Abdel-Kader, Syrian footballer
  - Alessandro La Vecchia, Italian retired footballer
  - Guillaume Lépine, French professional footballer
- January 21 –
  - Markus Berger, Austrian youth international
  - Pitono, Indonesian footballer
- January 22 – Momo Sissoko, Malian footballer
- January 23 – Dylan Hughes, Welsh former professional footballer
- January 25 –
  - Félix Isael González, Mexican professional footballer
  - Laurent Nardol, French professional footballer
- January 30 – Rolan Khugayev, former Russian footballer

=== February ===
- February 5
  - Cristiano Ronaldo, Portuguese footballer
  - Igor Shapovalov, Russian former professional football player
- February 13
  - Hedwiges Maduro, Dutch footballer
  - Alexandros Tziolis, Greek footballer
- February 14 – Philippe Senderos, Swiss footballer
- February 16 – Jérôme Bigard, Luxembourger international footballer
- February 17
  - Reitumetse Moloisane, Lesotho footballer
  - Hadef Saif, Emirati footballer
- February 18 – Charly Ollier, French professional footballer
- February 24
  - Thomas Aupic, French professional footballer
  - Darío Herrera, Argentine football referee
- February 28 – Diego, Brazilian footballer

=== March ===
- March – 8 Juan Ignacio Acosta, Paraguayan-born Chilean footballer
- March 14 – Ian Black, Scottish footballer
- March 15 –
  - Curtis Davies, English youth international
  - Andrei Pushkarev, former Russian professional footballer
- March 18 – Tomasz Bzdęga, Polish footballer
- March 22 – Mayola Biboko, Angolan-born Belgian footballer
- March 25 – Patricio Maldonado, Chilean footballer
- March 31 – Apinan Kaewpila, Thai club footballer (died 2020)

=== April ===
- April 2
  - Denis Mustafaraj, Albanian retired footballer
  - Luis Rogel, Chilean footballer
- April 13 – Márcio Tarrafa, Brazilian footballer
- April 15 – Marcos Pereira, Paraguayan footballer
- April 21 – Lucas Rastello, French former professional footballer
- April 30 – Shane Hobbs, English former professional footballer

=== May ===
- May 4 – Fernandinho, Brazilian footballer
- May 9 – Rick Kruys, Dutch footballer
- May 16 – Maksim Chernokozov, former Russian professional football player
- May 22 – Javier Dopico, Spanish former footballer
- May 25
  - Musaba Selemani, Burundian footballer
  - Zâmbia (João Marcos Ferreira Andrade), Brazilian former professional footballer
- May 28 – Frederik De Winne, Belgian footballer

=== June ===
- June 1 – Mário Hipólito, Angolan goalkeeper
- June 4
  - Didi Kitumbo Mpiana, retired Congolese footballer
  - Lukas Podolski, German footballer
- June 6
  - Sota Hirayama, Japanese footballer
  - Becky Sauerbrunn, American women's soccer player
- June 9 – Eusebio Henrique de Almeida, East Timorese footballer
- June 12
  - Shin Dong-bin, South Korean footballer
- June 22 – Ivan Namaseb, Namibian international footballer
- June 25
  - Scott Brown, Scottish footballer
  - Mohd Fitri Omar, Malaysian footballer
- June 28 – Phil Bardsley, English footballer

=== July ===
- July 1 – Ocean Mushure, Zimbabwean footballer
- July 4 – Pei Yuwen, Chinese footballer
- July 5
  - Megan Rapinoe, American women's soccer player
- July 9 – Ben Watson, English footballer
- July 10
  - Mario Gómez, German footballer
  - Tidiane Sane, Senegalese footballer
  - Bastian Schulz, German footballer
  - Park Chu-young South Korean footballer
- July 11 – Emzar Rozomashvili, former Russian professional footballer
- July 12
  - Gabriel Florea, Romanian footballer
  - David Narváez and Sergio Narváez, Spanish club footballers
- July 13 – Guillermo Ochoa, Mexican footballer
- July 16 – Denis Tahirović, Croatian footballer
- July 18 – José Carlos Júnior, Brazilian footballer
- July 22 – Matteo Dionisi, Italian professional footballer
- July 25 – Rodrigo Celsi, Chilean footballer
- July 26 – Willis Francis, English footballer
- July 31 – Jozef Medgyes, Slovak footballer

=== August ===
- August 3 – Johan Lapeyre, French professional footballer
- August 5 – Salomon Kalou, Ivorian footballer
- August 7 – Jocy Barros, Santomean footballer
- August 16 – Thilina Suranda, Sri Lankan international footballer

=== September ===
- September 1 – José Mari, Spanish footballer
- September 5
  - Oleksandr Akymenko, Ukrainian striker
  - Dario Jertec, Croatian midfielder
  - Zeferino Martins, East Timorese midfielder
- September 7 − Rafinha, Brazilian footballer
- September 9 – Scott Carson, English footballer
- September 15 – Denis Calincov, Moldovan footballer
- September 23
  - Hossein Kaebi, Iranian footballer
  - Nahomi Kawasumi, Japanese footballer
- September 26 – Krzysztof Żukowski, Polish professional footballer
- September 28 – Vladimír Peška, former Czech footballer

=== October ===
- October 1 – Tim Deasy, English footballer
- October 5 – Marius Jurczyk, German-Polish footballer
- October 14 – Guillermo Zschusschen, Dutch footballer
- October 17 – Collins John, Dutch footballer
- October 24 – Wayne Rooney, English footballer
- October 25
  - Isah Eliakwu, Nigerian footballer
  - Óscar Granados, Costa Rican footballer
  - Michael Liendl, Austrian footballer
  - Juan Manuel Martínez, Argentine footballer
  - Ihor Oshchypko, Ukrainian footballer
  - Daniele Padelli, Italian footballer

=== November ===
- November 2 – Segun Atere, Nigerian footballer
- November 4 – Marcell Jansen, German footballer
- November 5
  - Alo Dupikov, Estonian international
  - Rimo Hunt, Estonian international
- November 15 – Elad Gabai, Israeli footballer
- November 24 – Milan Kopic, Czech footballer
- November 25 – Fernandinho, Brazilian footballer

=== December ===
- December 10 – Charlie Adam, Scottish footballer
- December 24 – Raydell Kewal, Dutch footballer
- December 28 – Naing Zayar Htun, Myanmar footballer

== Deaths ==
=== January ===
- January 28 – Alfredo Foni, Italian defender, winner of the 1938 FIFA World Cup. (74)

=== May ===
- May 11 – 54 Bradford City A.F.C. fans and 2 Lincoln City F.C. fans die in the Bradford City stadium fire.
- May 15 – Renato Olmi, Italian midfielder, winner of the 1938 FIFA World Cup. (70)
- May 19 – Víctor Rodríguez Andrade, Uruguayan defender, winner of the 1950 FIFA World Cup. (58)
- May 24 – Natalio Perinetti, Argentine midfielder, runner-up of the 1930 FIFA World Cup. (84)
- May 29 – 39 people, mostly Juventus FC fans, die in the Heysel Stadium disaster.

=== September ===
- September 10 – Jock Stein, Scottish manager (born 1922)

=== October ===
- October 9 – Ludo Coeck, Belgian footballer (born 1955)

=== November ===
- November 15 – Carlos Spadaro, Argentine striker, runner-up of the 1930 FIFA World Cup. (83)
