= Vecchia =

Vecchia may refer to:

== People ==
- Alessandro La Vecchia (born 1985), Italian footballer
- Aurelio Dalla Vecchia (1958-2024), Italian Olympic sailor
- Carlo La Vecchia (born 1955), Italian epidemiologist
- Carmo Dalla Vecchia (born 1971), Brazilian actor
- Francesco La Vecchia (born 1954), Italian classical conductor
- Paolo Di Vecchia (born 1942), Italian theoretical physicist
- Pietro della Vecchia (1603-1678), Italian painter
- Pietro Vecchia (bishop), 17th-century Italian Catholic bishop
- Roberto Dalla Vecchia (born 1968), Italian guitarist, composer, and singer
- Stefano Vecchia (born 1995), Swedish professional footballer
- Zaccaria della Vecchia (died 1625), Roman Catholic prelate

== Places ==
- Bussana Vecchia, former ghost town in Liguria, Italy
- Denti della Vecchia, mountain in Switzerland
- Lago della Vecchia, a lake in the Piedmont region of Italy
- La Vecchia Scuola, restaurant in York, England
- Palazzo Mocenigo Casa Vecchia, palazzo in Italy
- Porta Vecchia, 14th-century city gate in Grosseto, Italy
- Sagrestia Vecchia, one of the sacristies of the Basilica of San Lorenzo, Florence
- Santa Maria Donna Regina Vecchia, a church in Naples, Italy
- Scuola vecchia della Misericordia, former charity building in Venice, Italy
- Torrecchia Vecchia, private estate in Cisterna di Latina, Italy
- Villa Vecchia, a patrician villa near Frascati, Italy

== Others ==
- Peppino e la vecchia signora, 1954 Italian comedy film
- Quella Vecchia Locanda, musical group from Rome
- Vecchia approximation, Gaussian processes approximation technique
