= Jocy =

Jocy is a name. Notable people with the name include:

- Jocy or Joazhifel Soares (born 1991), Santomean football player
- Jocy Barros (born 1985), Santomean football player
- Jocy de Oliveira (born 1936), Brazilian pianist and composer

== See also ==
- Jacy
