= João Marcos =

João Marcos is the name of:

- João Marcos (footballer, born 1953), full name João Marcos Coelho da Silva, Brazilian footballer who played as a goalkeeper
- João Marcos (footballer, born 1981), full name João Marcos Alves Ferreira, Brazilian footballer who played as a defensive midfielder and right back
- João Marcos (footballer, born 1985), full name João Marcos Andrade Ferreira and also known as Zâmbia, Brazilian footballer who played as a full back
- João Marcos (footballer, born 1991), full name João Marcos Quintanilha, Brazilian footballer who played as a midfielder
- João Marcos (footballer, born 2000), full name João Marcos Lima Candido, Brazilian footballer who plays as a forward
