= QVL =

QVL may stand for:

- Quella Vecchia Locanda, an Italian band
- Qatari Volleyball League
- Cajatambo North Lima Quechua language (ISO 639: qvl)
