= Mersinaki =

Archaeological site in Cyprus

Mersinaki is an ancient place located near the shore, between Vouni and Soli, in Cyprus. The Swedish Cyprus Expedition, led by Einar Gjerstad, excavated Mersinaki during the year 1930 and found an open-air sanctuary by a river delta.

== Background ==
In prehistoric times there might have been a bay of sea where the fertile fields are today. Here the Swedish Expedition found a lot of sculptures. For example, the large terracotta sculptures of bearded male figures now visible at Medelhavsmuseet in Stockholm. These are interpreted as votive gifts to the god Apollon. The sanctuary might have been dedicated to Apollon since two inscriptions mention him, but another inscription mentions Athena as well. The custom of founding sanctuaries in deltas or estuaries where freshwater and saltwater emerge is seen both at Phoenician and Greek sanctuaries.

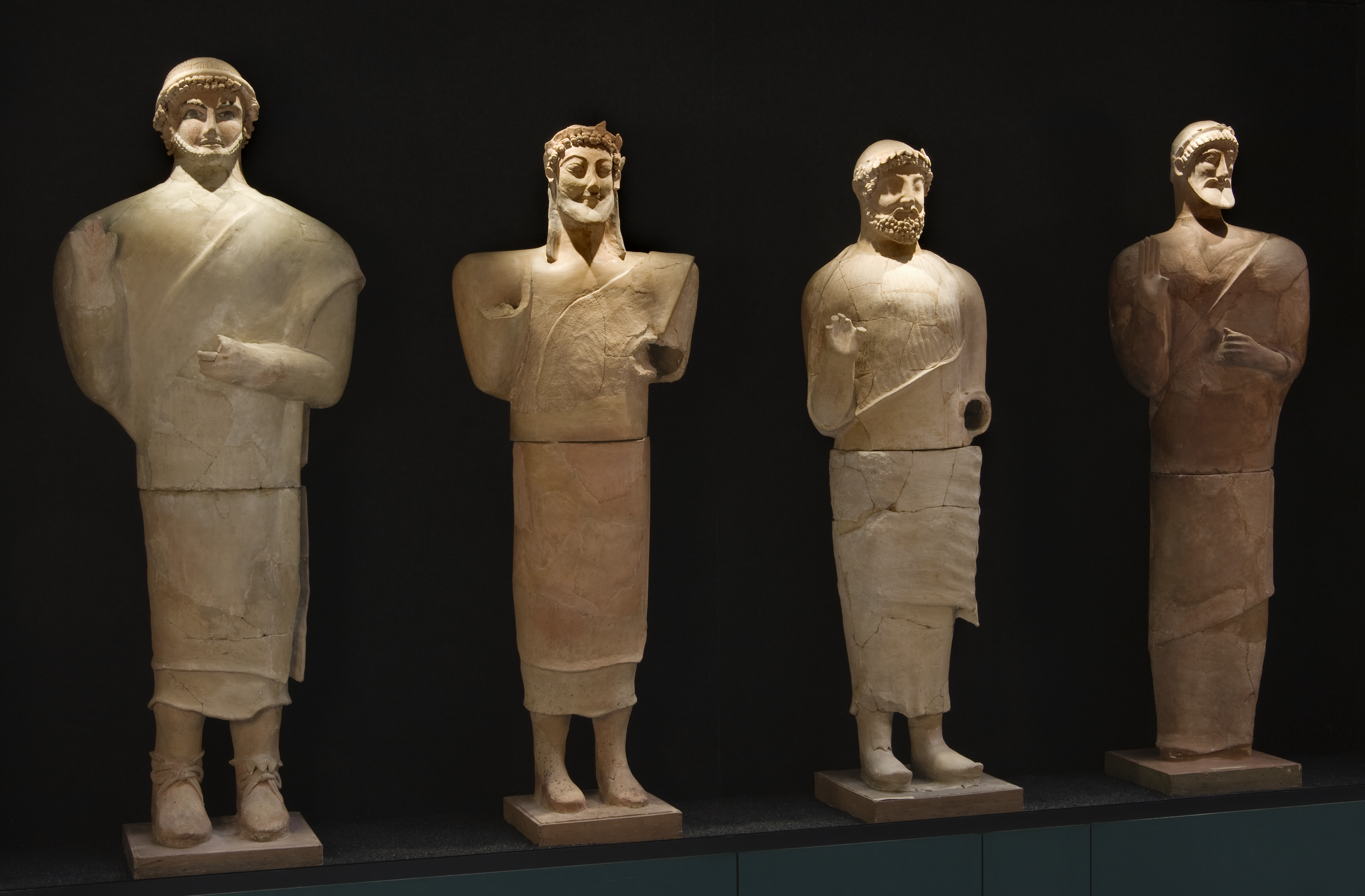
Four terracotta sculptures from Mersinaki. Can be seen at Medelhavsmuseet.

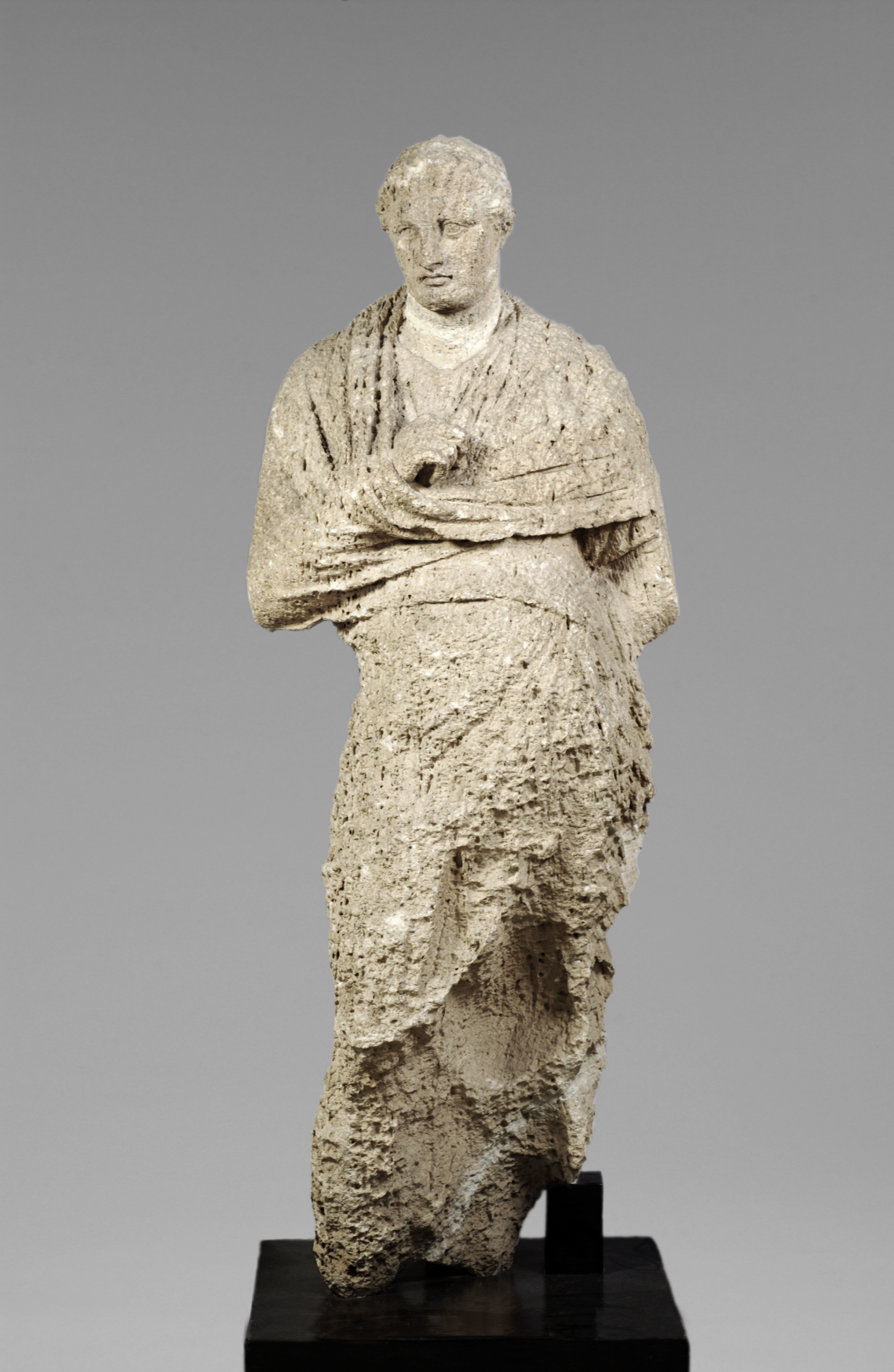
Lifesize male sculpture of limestone wearing a chiton. ca. 325–50 B.C. From Mersinaki. Can be seen at Medelhavsmuseet.

The excavation began with one trench and when the archaeologists realized that statues of terracotta and stone were probably buried here, they decided to do a large-scale excavation at the site of Mersinaki. The archaeologists found few architectural remains. The remains they found can be divided into two separate buildings or building systems. The first one consists only of fragments and small rubble walls, therefore, the shape of the building is difficult to decide. The second building system was found in a much better state of preservation. These walls create a rectangular room. Two different stratification layers were distinguished. One of them had no traces of pottery, fragments of sculptures, or similar objects. These layers existed before the place was used for sacred purposes. They recognized that some pits of various shapes and sizes had been dug from the same level. Inside the pits found traces of sculptures made of stone and terracotta, as well as some pottery. The pits were also filled with sandy, dark layers of earth. The archeologists concluded that the statues had a connection with the building and that the pits were dug along the borders of the temenos.

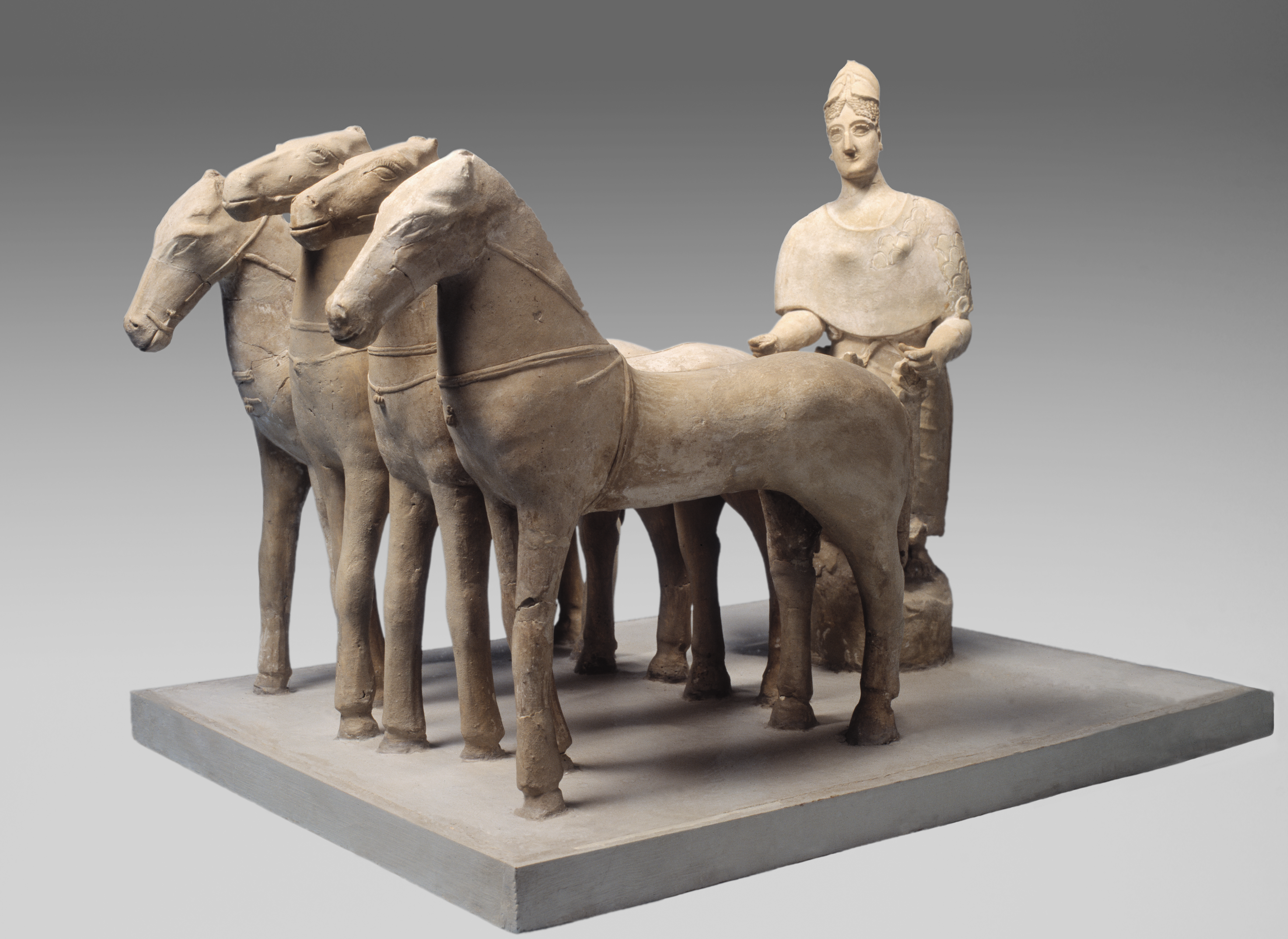
The goddess Athena mounted on a chariot drawn by four horses. ca. 600–400 B.C. From Mersinaki. Can be seen at Medelhavsmuseet.

The terracotta sculptures are difficult to classify since they are very monotonous in shape. The archaeologists thought that at least some of the molds were not of Cypriote origin but with a Greek expression. They proposed the idea that heads made in foreign molds were placed on bodies made in the local Cypriote type. Sometimes the heads could be altered. Therefore, the result was a hybrid style with a Cypriote body and a Greek head. Minor terracotta plastics were found as well, these usually depict a chariot group similar to the ones found at Agia Eirini. One of these groups depicts Athena. The sculptures are dated between Cypro-Archaic II and Cypro-Classic I, until the Cypro-Hellenistic period.

The stone sculptures are made of a similar soft limestone as was used in Vouni. Some were made of a harder stone that was reminiscent of the stone found at Poros. Few of the sculptures were completely preserved, but the ones that were are very characteristic. The sculptures made from hard limestone differ from the softer ones both in style and technique. According to the archaeologists, the harder ones are more influenced by the Greek-Hellenistic styles meanwhile the softer ones are more connected to the local Cypriote styles and show a degeneration of the Cypro-Archaic styles.

Later the site was destroyed. The pieces of the sculptures were scattered about all over the ground but not removed far from the place. In Roman times the indistinct house was constructed close to the old temple site but on a higher level. After this house was destroyed the site was abandoned entirely and there are no signs of the place being used after this period.
