= Atere =

Nigerian given name

- Language: Yoruba

Origin
- Origin: Nigerian
- Meaning: The straightforward one
- Region of origin: South-west Nigeria

AtereAtere is a Nigerian surname of Yoruba origin meaning "The straightforward one." The name is formed from “a” (one who) and “tẹ́rẹ́” (straightforward), giving it the morphological structure a-tẹ́rẹ́.

== Notable people with the surname ==
- Johnson Akin Atere – Nigerian clergy
- Segun Atere –Nigerian football midfielder
- Fatai Atere (born 1971) Nigerian footballer
