= Rogel =

Rogel is a surname. Notable people with the surname include:

- Agustín Rogel (born 1997), Uruguayan footballer
- Anna Rogel (1751–1784), Finnish preacher
- Bernard Rogel (born 1956), French admiral
- Fran Rogel (1927–2002), American football player
- Jason Rogel (born 1976), American actor
- José Rogel (1829–1901), Spanish composer
- Luis Rogel (born 1985), Chilean footballer
- Nakdimon Rogel (1925–2011), Israeli journalist
- Steven Rogel, American business executive

== See also ==
- Rogelj
- Rogell
- Torta Rogel
