= Limnitis =

Limnitis: Λιμνίτης (Greek); Yeşilırmak (Turkish)
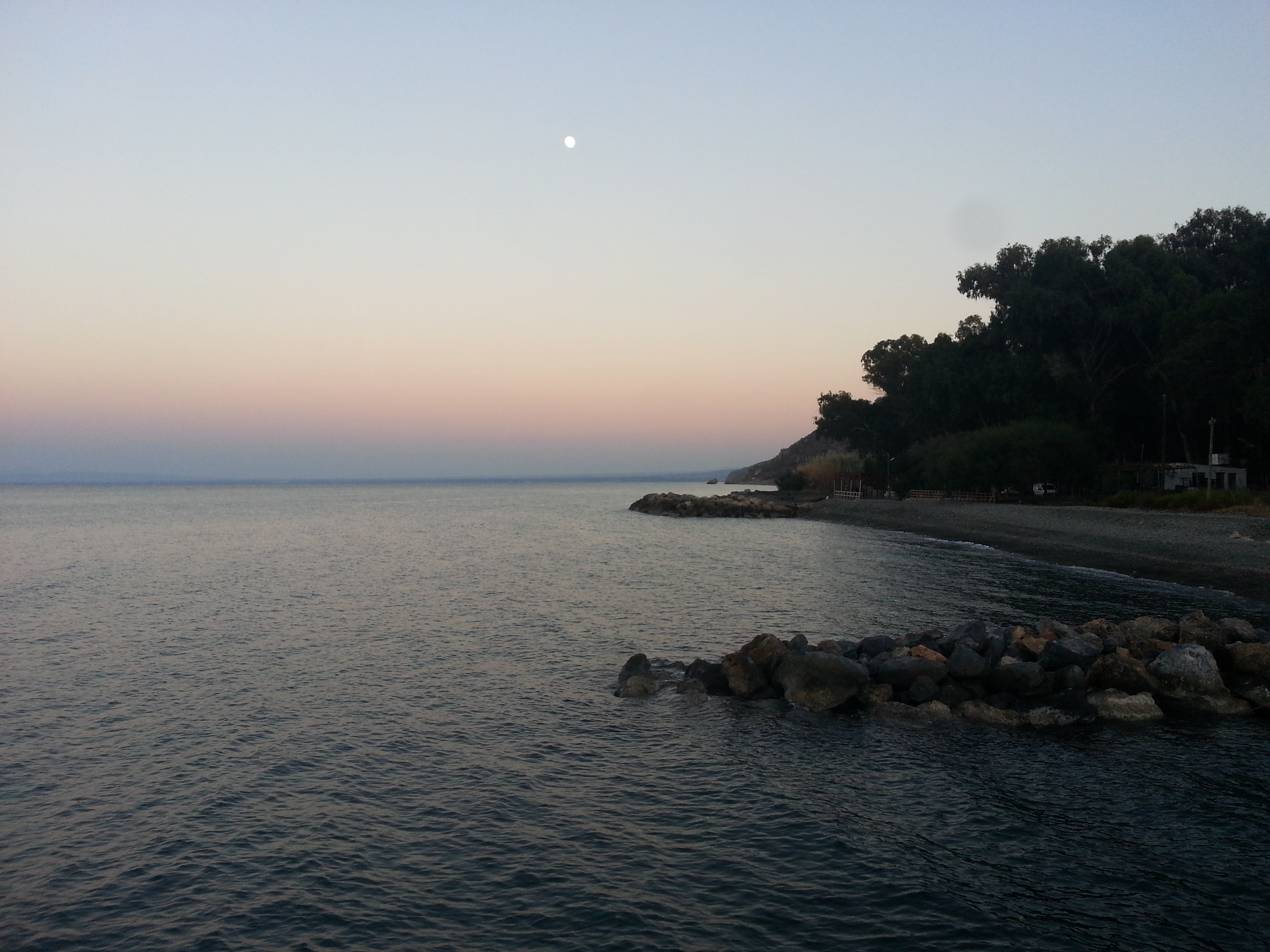

- Location within Cyprus
- Coordinates: 35°10′02″N 32°44′17″E
- Country (de jure): Cyprus
  - District: Nicosia District
- Country (de facto): Northern Cyprus
  - District: Lefke District

Population (2011)
  - Total: 458
- Time zone: UTC+2 (EET)
  - Summer (DST): UTC+3 (EEST)

Limnitis (Greek: Λιμνίτης; Turkish: Yeşilırmak) is a coastal village in the Tylliria region of north-western Cyprus. The upper parts of the village are located 20 metres above sea level, but Limnitis extends all the way down to the beach.

Limnitis is under the de jure control of the Republic of Cyprus and is a quarter of Xerovounos.; it is under the de facto control of the Turkish Republic of Northern Cyprus, whose sovereignty is recognised only by Turkey.

== History ==
The village is located on the North Western slopes of the Troodos Mountains. The region shows clear signs of early settlement; the ruins of Vouni Palace are located nearby, and the ruins of the city of Soli are located a little further to the East.

Modern settlement in the area began in the early 19th century. Two families settled here; the Osman family settled in Xerovounos (Turkish: Kurutepe) and the Süleyman family settled in Selemani (Turkish: Süleymaniye).

== Annan Plan ==
The Annan Plan for Cyprus called for the transfer of this region to a new "Greek Cypriot Constituent State" in a new Cypriot (con-)federation, while allowing the original inhabitants to retain their homes. This plan was later rejected by a majority of the Greek Cypriot population, and the area remains under the de facto control of Northern Cyprus.

== Population ==
The size of the original population of the village seems to be disputed. According to figures of the Cypriot Government, the 1960 population was 323 (315 Turks and 8 Greeks) and, in 1973, the population was estimated at 396, all Turks. Turkish sources say that the town had swelled to about 1,200 people by 1968. Turkish sources estimate that around 2,000 people originating in the town now live in the United Kingdom and a further 1,500 live in Australia. In 2011, Limnitis had a population of 458.

The people are farmers; growing fruit and vegetables and selling them at markets is their main source of income. The village is known for its strawberries.
