= Marcos Pereira =

Marcus Pereira may refer to:

- Marcos Soares Pereira (died 1655), Portuguese composer
- Marcos Pereira (politician) (born 1972), Brazilian lawyer, bishop, and politician
- Marcos Pereira (footballer, born 1973), Brazilian football midfielder
- Marcos Pereira (footballer, born 1975), Brazilian football forward
- Marcos Pereira (footballer, born 1985), Paraguayan football midfielder
