= York College for Girls =

Listed building in York, England

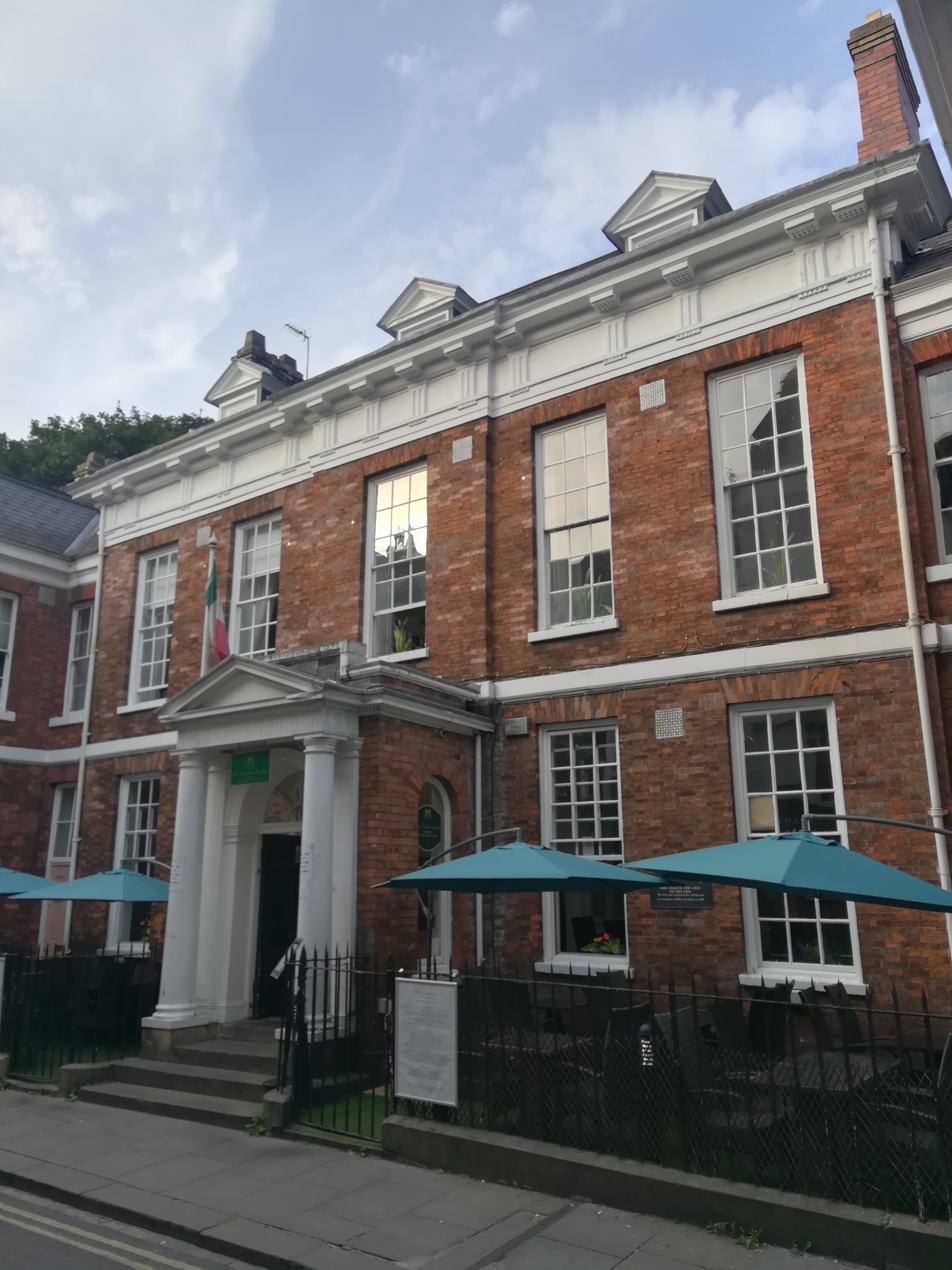
- The building in 2018
- Interactive map of the York College for Girls area

General information
- Location: 62 Low Petergate, York, England
- Coordinates: 53°57′40″N 1°04′53″W
- Completed: c. 1725
- Renovated: Late 18th century (portico) c. 1866 and late 19th century (wings rebuilt, altered)

Technical details
- Floor count: 2 + attic

Design and construction
- Designations

Listed Building – Grade II*
- Official name: York College for Girls
- Designated: 14 June 1954
- Reference no.: 1257410

York College for Girls was a girls' school in York, England, founded in 1908 and closed in 1997.

The school was founded by the Church Schools Company (later the United Church Schools Trust) and opened with twelve pupils on 24 January 1908 on Low Petergate, York, in a building dating to around 1725. By 1997, the school had about 200 pupils and was in the same buildings with later extensions.

In 1996, there were reports of a "cash crisis" and the school closed in 1997.

The buildings are Grade II* listed, and after the school closed they became the home of the restaurant La Vecchia Scuola ("the old school" in Italian), which is still in operation.

== Former pupils ==
Notable former pupils include:

- Dame Janet Baker (born 1933), singer
- Mary Isolen Fergusson (1914–1997), civil engineer
- Delia Jarrett-Macauley, writer, academic and broadcaster
- Claudia Lawrence (born 1974), long term missing person
- Margaret Mann Phillips (1906–1987), historian

== See also ==
- Grade II* listed buildings in the City of York
- Listed buildings in York (within the city walls, northern part)
