= Rogell =

Rogell is a surname. Notable people with the name include:

- Albert S. Rogell (1901–1988), American film director
- Billy Rogell (1904–2003), American baseball player
- Gregg Rogell (born 1967), American professional comedian
- Sid Rogell (1900–1973), American film producer

== See also ==
- Rogel (surname)
