= Selemani =

Selemani can be both a masculine given name and a surname. Notable people with the name include:

== Given name ==
- Selemani Bungara (1961-2026), Tanzanian politician
- Selemani Jafo, Tanzanian politician
- Selemani Mwalimu (born 2006), Tanzanian football striker
- Selemani Ndikumana (born 1987), Burundian football forward
- Selemani Zedi, Tanzanian politician

== Surname ==
- Ahinga Selemani (born 1996), Canadian-born football forward
- Comfort Selemani (born 2004), Zambian football midfielder
- Faïz Selemani (born 1993), French-born football winger
- Johnny Selemani (born 2008), Canadian football forward
- Musaba Selemani (born 1985), Burundian football striker
