= Disappearance of Claudia Lawrence =

Unsolved 2009 disappearance of 35-year-old woman from York, England

Claudia Lawrence
- Born: 27 February 1974; Malton, North Riding of Yorkshire, England
- Disappeared: c. 18 March 2009 (aged 35); Heworth, York, England
- Status: Missing for 17 years, 8 months and 3 days
- Occupation: Chef
- Known for: Missing person

Claudia Elizabeth Lawrence was a 35-year-old chef at the University of York's Goodricke College, who disappeared without trace around 18 March 2009.

Lawrence grew up in Malton, North Yorkshire, England and had a close relationship with her parents, sister and best friends. She was educated at the York College for Girls before training as a chef. She was seen leaving work in Heworth, York on 18 March, and spotted near her home later that day. She also spoke to both of her parents by phone that evening, and demonstrated her usual good spirits. After failing to report for work the following day, she has not been seen or heard from since.

Initially treating the case as a missing person, North Yorkshire Police upgraded it to murder around five weeks later. They speculated a series of complex relationships with men may have been a motive, and the leading police theory is that she was likely abducted and murdered by somebody she knew in this group. Despite several arrests, nobody has ever been charged and Lawrence's fate remains unknown. Her father subsequently helped pass the Guardianship (Missing Persons) Act 2017, but died without knowing what ultimately happened to his daughter.

== Background ==
Claudia Elizabeth Lawrence was born on 27 February 1974 in Malton, North Riding of Yorkshire. She spent her early life with her father Peter, mother Joan, and older sister Ali. Her father was a prosperous solicitor specialising in commercial law, while her mother was a member of Malton Town Council who later served a term as mayor of the town.

Lawrence was privately educated at the York College for Girls. She later attended a local catering college and qualified as a chef. After several jobs, she found employment at the University of York's Goodricke College, working as a chef in the canteen of the university's main campus. She bought a terraced cottage in the York suburb of Heworth, about three miles (5 km) from her place of work. Lawrence was considered punctual and reliable by her employer.

Lawrence was known to have an enjoyable social life, particularly with her best friends in the local pub. After moving to Heworth in 2007, she regularly spent evenings at The Nag's Head pub close to her home. The Yorkshire Post reported that Lawrence had met, and started brief relationships with, other customers in the pub, which her father admitted created "awkward situations". She had been to Cyprus on holiday several times, and she was believed to have also explored job opportunities there.

== Disappearance ==
Locations related to the disappearance:
1 Heworth Road – Lawrence's home
2 The Nags Head pub, which Lawrence frequently visited
3 Post Office, 204 Melrosegate – CCTV on Lawrence's route to work
4 Roger Kirk centre, Goodricke Way, University of York – where Lawrence worked as a chef.

=== Last known whereabouts ===
At 6:00 am on 18 March 2009, Lawrence started her shift at Goodricke College's Roger Kirk Centre. She completed her shift at 2:00 pm and was recorded on CCTV leaving the college on foot a few minutes later. She accepted a lift from a coworker back home, before going out shopping. Just after 3:00 pm she was recorded on CCTV passing a post office in Melrosegate near her home. During the course of the evening Lawrence spoke to both her father and mother on her mobile phone. Her mother described Lawrence's mood as normal and relaxed. The two discussed celebrating the forthcoming Mother's Day. Lawrence told her mother she was at home and that she planned to retire early since she would have to rise before 5:00 am the next day in order to walk the 1.6 miles (2.6 km) to work, as her car was having an engine replaced. She sent a final text message from her mobile phone at 8:23 pm and a final incoming text was received at 9:12 pm. Thereafter nobody is known to have seen or heard from Lawrence.

=== Reported missing ===
On Thursday 19 March, Lawrence was scheduled to start work at 6:00 am, but did not report for duty. Her manager called her mobile; although the phone rang, the call was directed to voice messaging. The manager took no further action. Lawrence had previously arranged to meet her friend Suzy Cooper at The Nag's Head that night. Cooper turned up to the pub as planned, but Lawrence did not. Cooper then attempted to contact Lawrence by telephone. Lawrence was normally a prolific user of her mobile, a Samsung SGH-D900, so Cooper was surprised when she was unable to attract a response. Cooper attempted to contact Lawrence again around 10:30 am on Friday, 20 March, but again without success. At this point Cooper became alarmed and contacted mutual acquaintances including George Forman, landlord of The Nag's Head, to obtain information concerning her possible whereabouts.

Cooper telephoned the local hospital to see if Lawrence had been involved in an accident, but nobody with her name had been admitted. She then telephoned Lawrence's father Peter on 20 March to report the situation. Peter telephoned his daughter's manager at Goodricke College and was told that she had not reported for duty on either 19 or 20 March, which was considered extremely unusual. He then entered Claudia's home using his own key in company with George Forman. The two men found the house to be in an orderly state. The bed was made and there were unwashed dishes in the kitchen sink, suggesting she had eaten breakfast. Lawrence's handbag containing her purse, bank cards and passport was in the house. The only significant items missing were her mobile phone, a set of hair straighteners and a rucksack which she normally used to carry her chef's whites to and from work. Indications were that Lawrence had left the house normally to go to work at around 5:00 am on 19 March, but never arrived.

The North Yorkshire Police (NYP) were contacted at around 2:00 pm on 20 March in order to report Lawrence as a missing person. Police officers met with Lawrence's father at her home shortly afterwards. NYP searched 270 houses and 1,000 rooms in the university's halls of residence, took 900 phone calls and 868 possible witness statements. After five weeks, they upgraded the enquiry from a missing person one to one of suspected murder.

== Case progress ==
=== Original investigation ===
The original NYP investigation of Lawrence's disappearance considered various possibilities, including:

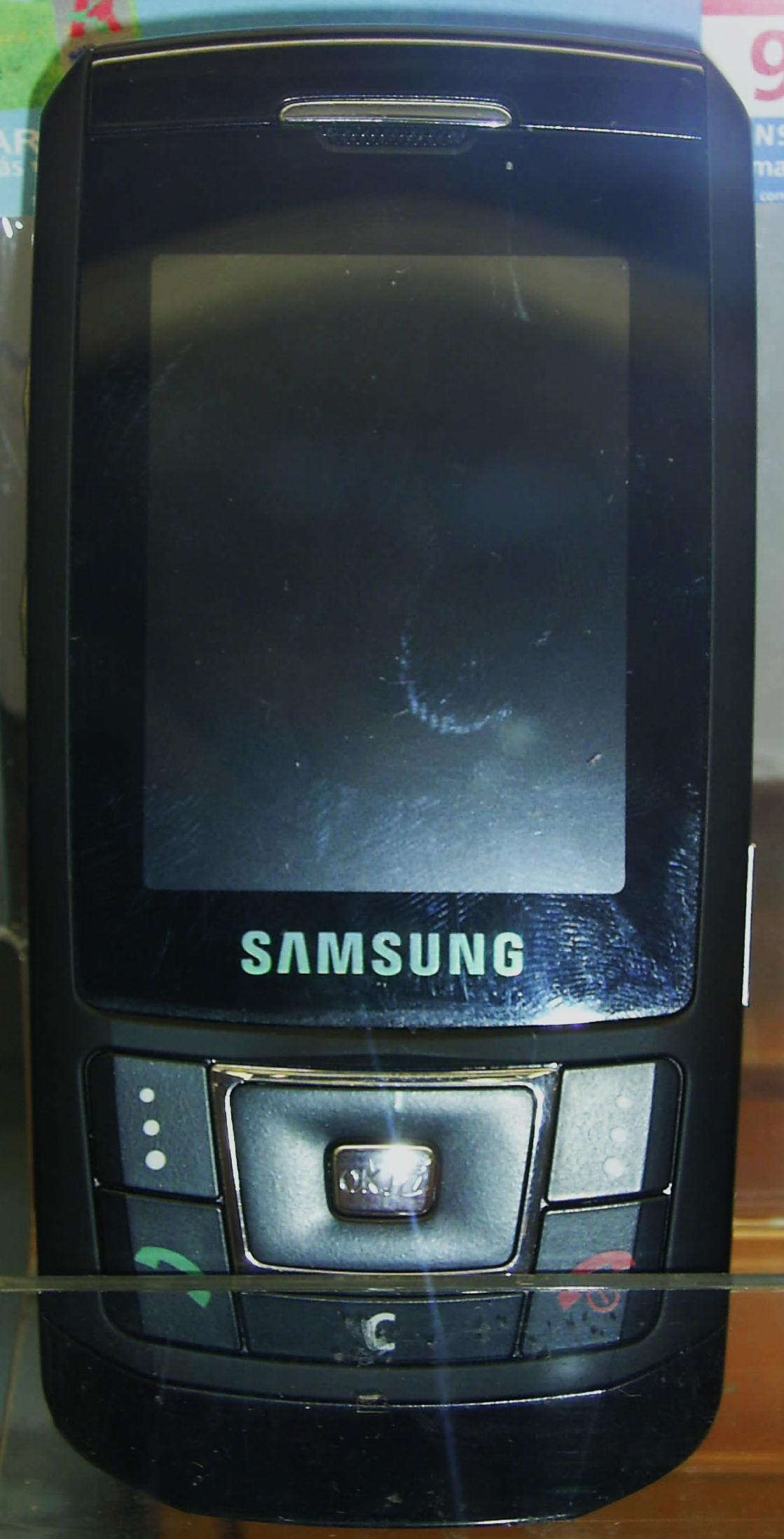
A similar Samsung D900 phone to Lawrence's that was missing and deliberately switched off

- That Lawrence had decided to start a new life, possibly in Cyprus because of several visits there.
- That Lawrence had suffered an accident or medical emergency on her way into work. The route from her home to place of work was checked at an early stage and no trace of her was found. This possibility was quickly dismissed.
- That Lawrence had been the victim of a chance encounter with a serial killer or other suspicious person. Witnesses did report various people behaving strangely in the Heworth area in the days leading up to Lawrence's disappearance. These reports were investigated but without conclusive results. Cases of known serial killers who might have been active in the area were also considered but discounted.
- That Lawrence had been killed by somebody she knew. Criminal profilers felt this was the most likely option, based on reports about her personal life. Most murder victims know their killer.

Significantly, Lawrence's mobile phone remained on until 12:10 p.m. on 19 March, at which time it was deliberately switched off. It was determined that the phone had been connected to a mast close to Heworth up until this time. The only CCTV camera on Lawrence's most direct route to work was at the Melrosegate Post Office, and the recording from the morning of 19 March did not show her passing.

The independent crime-fighting charity Crimestoppers offered a reward of £10,000 to anyone providing information which would lead to the arrest and conviction of any person linked to the disappearance. NYP received over 1,200 calls offering information, and an appeal was made by John Sentamu, the Archbishop of York.

As a result of appeals, a witness came forward in May saying they had been cycling along Melrosegate Bridge around 5.35 a.m. and seen a woman resembling Lawrence arguing with a 6-foot (1.8 m) tall man wearing combat trousers and a dark-blue hood. The witness said the argument looked heated and involved the pair pointing fingers at each other and waving arms. Police attempted to follow this up, but had no responses. Several people also witnessed a man driving a "rusty white van" had been attempting to pick up women in the local area shortly before Lawrence disappeared, and subsequently was not seen again after the police investigation started.

On 20 May, a reconstruction of Lawrence's last known movements was featured in an appeal on BBC One's Crimewatch. Also in June, 100 days after his daughter went missing, Peter Lawrence launched a YouTube appeal for information.

In late August, NYP and the Lawrence family used the annual Whitby Regatta in North Yorkshire to publicise the campaign. The following month, NYP began searching for evidence in Cyprus and conducting interviews on the island. Detective Superintendent Ray Galloway said Lawrence knew people there and may potentially have been offered employment. Galloway also stated that some people who had been interviewed had been "reluctant and less than candid" when spoken to. It was reported that the last text message received by Lawrence was from a man who was on the island.

Later in September, detectives made a search of an area of the University of York campus. On 24 March 2010, NYP began searching areas of Heslington in York, based on new information received "in the last few days". They searched land adjacent to a children's play area, near a muddy farm track, and the following day, relocated to a field near to the university, an area of land which is bordered by a playing field and student accommodation. Nothing of significance was discovered, and the search was later revealed to have been prompted by hoax information.

NYP reported that Lawrence may have engaged in a series of "covert" relationships with men, some of whom were married or in other relationships. They urged any such people to come forward with information, or risk having their adultery exposed. Galloway indicated that the probable explanation for Lawrence's disappearance lay in her lifestyle, principally in the "complexity and mystery" of these relationships. The investigation centred around construction of a "rogue's gallery" of the men she had been involved with. One Sky News journalist stated, "Claudia apparently lived a significant part of her life in secret. For a privately educated daughter of a country solicitor, Claudia had some unusual acquaintances and this remains the only missing person case where I have been warned off or threatened—not once but twice." Lawrence's father, Peter, disagreed with the views of his daughter's lifestyle. He said Claudia regularly saw her parents and Suzy Cooper and he had met most of her partners, adding that this, combined with long working hours would have left her little time to form a relationship with anyone else. The conflicting views of her family, local residents and the press added to the confusion and disagreements around this aspect of the case.

The general finding which emerged from the original enquiry was that Lawrence had probably been abducted and murdered shortly after leaving home on 19 March. The killer was likely to be somebody that she knew.

=== 2013 Major Crime Unit review ===
In June 2013, NYP announced the £300,000 creation of a new Major Crime Unit (MCU), set up to ease the burden on day-to-day policing. Based in Harrogate, the MCU was to be tasked from October 2013 to handle crimes including rape and kidnap, and review cold cases. The following month, NYP said the unit would revisit the case when the MCU opened.

The MCU subsequently assessed the Lawrence case and carried out new forensic searches at her home on Heworth Road. Using what were described as "advanced techniques not available in 2009," they found fingerprints in her house and a man's DNA on a cigarette end in her car. Cell site activity logged from her phone revealed she had visited Acomb in York in the weeks up to her disappearance. On the fifth anniversary of the disappearance, a new appeal was made on Crimewatch, which aired on 19 March 2014. CCTV footage, recovered in 2009, showed a silver Ford Focus hatchback car, manufactured between 1998 and 2004, driving along Heworth Road. The car's brake lights come on as it approaches level with Lawrence's cottage.

The new investigation, led by Detective Dai Malyn, made a number of arrests. On 13 May, a 59-year-old man was arrested by NYP on suspicion of Lawrence's murder. He lived close to her home and had been a colleague of hers at the University of York. The two were reported to have been on friendly terms and he had often given her lifts in his car to and from work. Searches were made of the suspect's house in York and his mother's house in North Shields, Tyneside. He was released on police bail the following day and then released from his bail without charge in November of that year. In July 2014, NYP arrested Paul Harris, the landlord of The Acomb pub (since renamed as The Clockhouse pub) in York on suspicion of perverting the course of justice. Harris was quickly released without charge. He complained that the police had excavated a section of the cellar floor of his pub. Harris stated that Lawrence had been a customer at his pub in the weeks before her disappearance and he had spoken to her, but stated that was his only connection with her.

External videos
- YouTube videos
- Claudia Lawrence Case: All CCTV Footage in Chronological Order

In 2015, police released CCTV footage of an unidentified man walking nearby to the alleyway at the rear of Lawrence's home on 18 March 2009 at 7:15 pm.

On 8 March 2016, the Crown Prosecution Service refused to pursue a case submitted by NYP against four men who had been arrested on suspicion of murder, citing lack of evidence. They all denied any involvement in Lawrence's disappearance. NYP complained about a lack of co-operation from witnesses.

=== Further investigations ===
Peter Lawrence died in February 2021, without knowing his daughter's fate. That August and September, police engaged in the Lawrence case searched Sand Hutton Gravel Pits, a wooded area around 8 miles (13 km) north-east of York city centre. The search was reportedly prompted by new evidence although police would not state what that new evidence was. The land had been used as fishing ponds since 1969. Police drained one of the lakes on site to allow ground-penetrating radar equipment and cadaver dogs to look for human remains there. At the end of the search, detective Wayne Fox, senior investigating officer in the Lawrence case, stated that nothing significant had been found.

In March 2024, fifteen years after Lawrence's disappearance, Fox released a statement stating that while the case had been in a "reactive phase" since 2017, it was not going to be closed. Detective Superintendent Jon Sygrove took over the case on 27 February 2025 on what would have been Lawrence's 51st birthday.

=== Alleged suspects ===
In his 2017 book, Catching a Serial Killer: My Hunt for Murderer Christopher Halliwell, Stephen Fulcher, the senior investigating officer in the murder of Sian O'Callaghan, suggests there are similarities between the Lawrence and O'Callaghan cases, along with the murder of Linda Razzell in 2002. O'Callaghan was murdered some time after 3:00 am on 19 March 2011 after accepting a ride in a licensed taxi. Although convicted of only two murders, Halliwell has been linked to other violent offences against women, potentially Lawrence. In 2018, miscarriage of justice organisation, Inside Justice, investigated the Razzell case (and the alleged links to Halliwell) as part of a BBC documentary, Conviction, but it concluded that the conviction was safe and stated there was nothing linking Halliwell to the crime other than speculation. In regard to Halliwell's possible involvement Lawrence's mother stated "The police may not have proved he had anything to do with my daughter's disappearance, but they haven't disproved it either". In 2023, NYP said it was unlikely that Halliwell had left his home county of Wiltshire, let alone travelled to Yorkshire at the time of Lawrence's disappearance.

== Claudia's Law ==
Lawrence's disappearance caused difficulty over her family's inability to manage her assets and liabilities. Her father, Peter, a solicitor, campaigned for the law to be modified in order to allow the appointment of guardians for the affairs of missing people. This campaigning eventually succeeded with the passing of the Guardianship (Missing Persons) Act 2017, which was introduced to Parliament as a Private Members' Bill. The Bill, which came into force in July 2019, allows the family of a missing person to apply to the court for guardianship of that person's estate 90 days after the disappearance. The new law became popularly known as "Claudia's Law".

== See also ==
- List of people who disappeared mysteriously (2000–present)
- Disappearance of Suzy Lamplugh
- Murder of Joanna Yeates

== Bibliography ==
- Drake, Phil (2024). "Chapter 54: Missing Presumed Murdered". Unsolved Murders of the UK - Cold Cases from 1951 to Present Day. Pen and Sword. ISBN 978-1-399-03257-5.
- Root, Neil (2013). Gone: The Disappearance of Claudia Lawrence and Her Father's Desperate Search for the Truth. Mainstream Publishing/Random House. ISBN 978-1-78057-504-9.
