= Rogelj =

Rogelj is a Slovene surname. Notable people with the surname include:

- Bine Rogelj (1929–2023), Slovene ski jumper
- Joeri Rogelj (born 1980), Belgian climatologist
- Rok Rogelj (born 1987), Slovene snowboarder
- Špela Rogelj (born 1994), Slovene ski jumper
- Žan Rogelj (born 1999), Slovene footballer

== See also ==
- Rogel
