= Lucas Rastello =

French footballer (born 1985)

Personal information
- Date of birth: 21 April 1985 (age 41)
- Place of birth: Marseille, France
- Height: 1.79 m (5 ft 10 in)
- Position: Goalkeeper

Senior career*
Years	Team	Apps	(Gls)
2002–2005	Marseille B	5	(0)
2005–2007	Cagnes-sur-Mer	46	(0)
2007–2010	Marignane	88	(0)
2010–2013	Gazélec Ajaccio	20	(0)
- * Club domestic league appearances and goals as of 08:13, 28 May 2016 (UTC)

Lucas Rastello (born 21 April 1985) is a French former professional footballer who played as a goalkeeper. He started his career with Marseille, where he made five appearances for the reserve team, before joining Cagnes-sur-Mer in 2005. Two years later, Rastello signed for Marignane and went on to play 88 league matches over the following three seasons. He transferred to Gazélec Ajaccio in the summer of 2010 and made 14 league appearances in the next two seasons as the side won consecutive promotions, firstly to the Championnat National in 2011 and then to Ligue 2 the following year. Rastello made his professional debut in the 1–2 Coupe de la Ligue defeat to Arles-Avignon on 28 August 2012.
