= Reitumetse Moloisane =

Mosotho footballer (born 1985)

Personal information
- Full name: Reitumetse Moloisane
- Date of birth: 17 February 1985 (age 41)
- Place of birth: Lesotho
- Positions: Forward; left winger

Team information
- Current team: Lesotho Prison Service

Senior career*
Years	Team	Apps	(Gls)
2008–	Lesotho Prison Service		

International career^{‡}
2008–	Lesotho	13	(1)
- * Club domestic league appearances and goals ‡ National team caps and goals as of 10:25, 22 December 2009 (UTC)

Reitumetse Moloisane (born 17 February 1985) is a Mosotho footballer who plays as a striker for Lesotho Prison Service. Since 2008, he has won 13 caps and scored one goal for the Lesotho national football team.
