= Maksim Chernokozov =

Russian footballer

Personal information
- Full name: Maksim Petrovich Chernokozov
- Date of birth: 16 May 1985 (age 41)
- Place of birth: Rostov-on-Don, Russian SFSR
- Height: 1.84 m (6 ft 0 in)
- Position: Defender

Team information
- Current team: FC Rostov-2 (assistant coach)

Youth career
- RO UOR Rostov-on-Don

Senior career*
Years	Team	Apps	(Gls)
2003–2005	FC Rostov	0	(0)
2006–2008	FC Taganrog	81	(2)
2009	FC SKA Rostov-on-Don	20	(1)
2010	FC Mostovik-Primorye Ussuriysk	20	(0)
2011	FC Taganrog	5	(0)

Managerial career
- 2023–2024: FC Rostov (academy)
- 2024–: FC Rostov-2 (assistant)
- * Club domestic league appearances and goals

Maksim Petrovich Chernokozov (Russian: Максим Петрович Чернокозов; born 16 May 1985) is a Russian professional football coach and a former player. He is an assistant coach with FC Rostov-2.

== Club career ==
He made his debut for FC Rostov on 13 July 2005 in the Russian Cup game against FC Luch-Energiya Vladivostok.
