= Ignacio Quirino =

Uruguayan footballer (born 1985)

Ignacio Quirino (born January 11, 1985, in Montevideo) is a Uruguayan footballer who currently plays for Mushuc Runa in the Ecuadorian Serie B.

== Teams ==
- (Uruguay) Peñarol 2006
- (Uruguay) Tacuarembó 2007
- (Uruguay) Racing Club 2007
- (Uruguay) Central Español 2008-2010
- (Spain) Universidad Las Palmas 2010-2011
- (Spain) San Andrés y Sauces 2011
- (Spain) San Pedro Mártir 2012
- (Ecuador) Mushuc Runa 2013–present
