= Johan Lapeyre =

French footballer (born 1985)

Personal information
- Date of birth: August 3, 1985 (age 41)
- Place of birth: Le Plessis-Bouchard, France
- Height: 1.80 m (5 ft 11 in)
- Position: Goalkeeper

Team information
- Current team: Montceau Bourgogne

Senior career*
Years	Team	Apps	(Gls)
2001–2010	Nancy B	93	(0)
2005–2010	Nancy	2	(0)
2008–2009	→ L'Entente SSG (loan)	30	(0)
2010–2011	US Sarre-Union	10	(0)
2011–2014	Olympique de Valence	86	(0)
2014–	Montceau Bourgogne	84	(0)
- * Club domestic league appearances and goals

Johan Lapeyre (born August 3, 1985) is a French professional football player, who currently plays for Montceau Bourgogne.

== Career ==
He played two games in the Ligue 1 for AS Nancy.
