= Naing Zayar Htun =

Burmese footballer

Personal information
- Date of birth: 28 December 1985 (age 40)
- Height: 1.77 m (5 ft 9 1/2 in)
- Position: Goalkeeper

Team information
- Current team: Zwegabin United
- Number: 22

Senior career*
Years	Team	Apps	(Gls)
2018 –	Zwegabin United		

International career^{‡}
2012	Myanmar	2	(0)
- * Club domestic league appearances and goals ‡ National team caps and goals as of 20 May 2015

Naing Zayar Htun (Burmese: နိုင်ဇေယျာထွန်း; born 28 December 1985) is a footballer from Burma, and a goalkeeper for the Myanmar national football team.

He currently plays for Zwegabin United in Myanmar National League.
