= Denis Mustafaraj =

Albanian footballer

Personal information
- Full name: Denis Mustafaraj
- Date of birth: 2 April 1985 (age 41)
- Place of birth: Albania
- Position: Midfielder

Senior career*
Years	Team	Apps	(Gls)
2006–2011	Laçi	68	(1)
- * Club domestic league appearances and goals

Denis Mustafaraj (born 2 April 1985) is an Albanian retired footballer who played as a midfielder for KF Laçi in the Albanian Superliga.
