= Pitono =

Indonesian footballer

Personal information
- Full name: Pitono
- Date of birth: January 21, 1985 (age 41)
- Place of birth: Malang, Indonesia
- Height: 1.78 m (5 ft 10 in)
- Position: Defender

Senior career*
Years	Team	Apps	(Gls)
2004–2010	Persema Malang	29	(0)
2011	Solo F.C.	19	(2)
2011–2014	Persela Lamongan	34	(0)

International career
2004	Indonesia U-19		
2006–2007	Indonesia U-23		
- * Club domestic league appearances and goals as of 14 March 2012

Pitono (born 21 January 1985) is an Indonesian former footballer.
