= Matteo Dionisi =

Italian footballer (born 1985)

Personal information
- Date of birth: 22 July 1985 (age 41)
- Place of birth: Rieti, Italy
- Height: 1.81 m (5 ft 11 in)
- Positions: Centre back; right back

Team information
- Current team: ASD Calcio Teor

Senior career*
Years	Team	Apps	(Gls)
2002–2003	Monterotondo	3	(0)
2003–2007	Rieti	122	(0)
2007	Valenzana	30	(0)
2009–2011	Rovigo	47	(3)
2009–2010	→ ASD La Sabina (loan)		
2011	Civitavecchia	11	(0)
2011–2013	Sacilese	53	(1)
2031–2014	Pordenone	27	(2)
2014–2016	Padova	49	(1)
2016–2017	Delta PT	21	(0)
2017–2018	Rieti	33	(1)
2018	Latina Calcio	15	(0)
2018–2019	Avellino	21	(0)
2019–2020	Savoia	24	(0)
2020–2022	Trento	62	(0)
2022	Casertana	10	(0)
2022–2025	Cjarlins Muzane	63	(0)
2025–	ASD Calcio Teor		
- * Club domestic league appearances and goals as of 19 November 2026

Matteo Dionisi (born 22 July 1985) is an Italian footballer who plays as a centre back for ASD Calcio Teor.

== Club career ==
Born in Rieti, Dionisi started his career in modest Serie D club Monterotondo, and then Rieti where he played for four seasons, winning the 2004–05 Serie D.

In 2007 he signed for Valenzana on Serie C2.

Between 2009 and 2012, he played in Serie D, and one season for Promozione club La Sabina. In 2014 he joined to Calcio Padova, and after won the promotion in 2014–15 Serie D, Dionisi made his professional Serie C debut for the club.

On 6 July 2018, he joined Latina Calcio.

In December 2018, he signed for Avellino.

On 1 July 2020, he moved to U.S. Savoia.

On 1 July 2020, he joined Serie D club Trento. On 6 July 2022, Dionisi moved to Casertana in Serie D.
