= Guillaume Lépine =

French footballer (born 1985)

Personal information
- Date of birth: 19 January 1985 (age 41)
- Place of birth: Calais, France
- Height: 1.90 m (6 ft 3 in)
- Position: Defender

Team information
- Current team: AS Marck

Senior career*
Years	Team	Apps	(Gls)
2003–2004	Mouscron	8	(0)
2004–	AS Marck		
- * Club domestic league appearances and goals as of 21:44, 23 November 2009 (UTC)

Guillaume Lépine (born 19 January 1985) is a French professional football player. As of 2012, he plays in the Championnat de France amateur for AS Marck.

He played on the professional level in Belgian First Division for R.E. Mouscron.
