= João Marcos (footballer, born 1991) =

Brazilian footballer

Personal information
- Full name: João Marcos Quintanilha Pires Fernandes
- Date of birth: 22 August 1991 (age 35)
- Place of birth: Rio de Janeiro, Brazil
- Position: Midfielder

Senior career*
Years	Team	Apps	(Gls)
2010–2011	Fortuna Sittard	5	(0)
2013	Corona Brașov	1	(0)
- * Club domestic league appearances and goals as of 16 February 2015 (CET)

João Marcos Quintanilha Pires Fernandes (born 22 August 1991), known as João Marcos, is a Brazilian professional footballer who played as a midfielder for Dutch club Fortuna Sittard in the 2010–11 season. Previously he played at Botafogo de Futebol e Regatas.
