= La Vecchia Scuola =

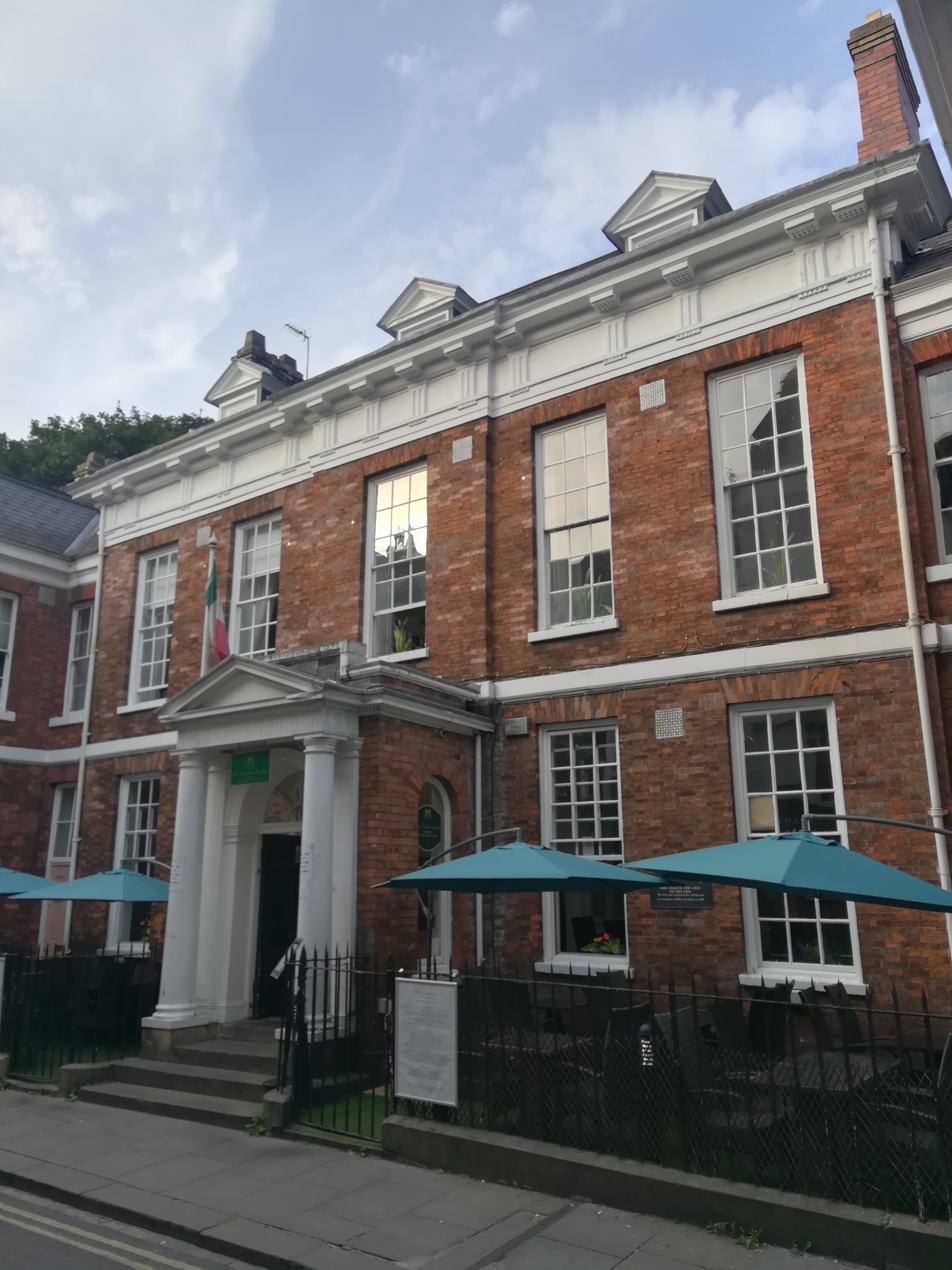
- The restaurant's frontage in 2018
- Interactive map of La Vecchia Scuola

Restaurant information
- Established: 1997 (29 years ago)
- Head chef: Decio Franca
- Location: 62 Low Petergate, York, England, North Yorkshire, YO1 7HZ, United Kingdom
- Coordinates: 53.960963°N 1.081283°W
- Website: lavecchiascuola.co.uk

La Vecchia Scuola is a restaurant in York, England. It occupies the former school building of York College for Girls on Low Petergate. The school closed in 1997, after 89 years, and the restaurant (whose name is Italian for "the old school") opened shortly thereafter.

The restaurant's dining room (in a conservatory) is the school's former refectory, while the bar area was the study of its last headmistress, Erica Taylor. The landscaped gardens was the school's playground.

The restaurant came under new ownership in 2013. Its manager and head chef is Decio Franca, who leased the business along with his wife, Gabriella. Franca replaced previous manager Vincenzo Fuccio, who was banned indefinitely from food management due to breaches of health and safety.
