= Laurent Nardol =

French footballer (born 1985)

Personal information
- Date of birth: January 25, 1985 (age 41)
- Place of birth: Paris, France
- Height: 1.84 m (6 ft 1/2 in)
- Position: Striker

Team information
- Current team: US Colomiers

Senior career*
Years	Team	Apps	(Gls)
2002–2005	Sedan (B team)		
2005–2007	US Créteil-Lusitanos	4	(0)
2007–2008	US Quevilly		
2008–2009	ES Fréjus		
2009–	US Colomiers		
- * Club domestic league appearances and goals as of 20:04, 25 November 2009 (UTC)

Laurent Nardol (born January 25, 1985) is a French professional football player. Currently, he plays in the Championnat de France amateur for US Colomiers Football.

He played on the professional level in Ligue 2 for US Créteil-Lusitanos.
