= Shane Hobbs =

English footballer (born 1985)

Personal information
- Full name: Shane Michael Hobbs
- Date of birth: 30 April 1985 (age 41)
- Place of birth: Bristol, England
- Position: Forward

Team information
- Current team: Highridge United

Youth career
- ?–2003: Bristol Rovers

Senior career*
Years	Team	Apps	(Gls)
2003–2004	Bristol Rovers	2	(0)
2003–2004	→ Clevedon Town (loan)	32	(12)
2004–?	Mangotsfield United		
?–2005	Frome Town		
2005–2006	Hallen	23	(5)
2006–?	Totterdown Port of Bristol		
?–2008	Taunton Town		
2008	Clevedon Town	1	(0)
2008–2009	Henbury		(32)
2009–2010	Highridge United		(27)
2012–2013	Greyfriars Athletic		(0)
- * Club domestic league appearances and goals as of 10:52, 19 February 2010 (UTC)

Shane Hobbs (born 30 April 1985) is a former professional footballer, who played in The Football League for Bristol Rovers in 2003, and played as a striker for Greyfriars Athletic.

Hobbs was a product of the youth system at Bristol Rovers, and was promoted to their professional squad at the beginning of the 2003–04 season. He made his debut on 18 October 2003, when he came on as a 70th-minute substitute for Wayne Carlisle in a Football League Two match against Cambridge United, and was used as a sub again in the same competition on 28 December 2003 when he replaced Junior Agogo in a game against Kidderminster Harriers. While with the club he was sent out on loan to Clevedon Town, where he played 32 times and scored twelve goals in the Southern League.

Following his release from Bristol Rovers in the summer of 2004 he dropped down to non-League football, and played for Mangotsfield United and Frome Town in the Southern League, before dropping down another level to play for Hallen in the Western Football League. He found that he wasn't enjoying playing at this level either, so moved even further down the English football league system to join Totterdown Port of Bristol in the Bristol and Suburban Association Football League, from where he joined Taunton Town.

He made a single substitute appearance for his previous club, Clevedon Town, in 2008, before playing alongside his brother at Henbury in the Gloucestershire County League, where his father was assistant manager. He was the league's top scorer during the 2008–09 season with 32 goals, and moved on to play for Highridge United in the same competition in 2009. Hobbs is currently top goal scorer for south Gloucestershire county league.
