= Apinan Kaewpila =

Thai footballer (1985–2020)

Personal information
- Full name: Apinan Kaewpila
- Date of birth: 31 March 1985
- Place of birth: Nakhon Phanom, Thailand
- Date of death: 21 June 2020 (aged 35)
- Place of death: Pathum Thani, Thailand
- Height: 1.72 m (5 ft 7 1/2 in)
- Position: Defender

Youth career
- 2001–2005: Patumkongka School

Senior career*
Years	Team	Apps	(Gls)
2006–2010	Samutsongkhram	82	(5)
2011	Chanthaburi		
2012	TTM Phichit		
2013	Samutsongkhram	0	(0)
2013	Rayong	10	(0)
2014–2015	TOT	18	(1)
2016	Samut Sakhon	14	(0)
- * Club domestic league appearances and goals

Apinan Kaewpila (Thai: อภินันท์ แก้วปีลา, born 31 March 1985 – 21 June 2020) was a Thai professional footballer, who played as a defender.
