= Antonijo Pranjić =

Slovenian footballer

Antonijo Pranjič
Personal information
- Full name: Antonijo Pranjič
- Date of birth: 14 January 1985 (age 41)
- Place of birth: SFR Yugoslavia
- Position: Defender

Senior career*
Years	Team	Apps	(Gls)
2004-2009	Celje	21	(0)
2004	→ Šmartno ob Paki (loan)	18	(3)
2005	→ Dravinja (loan)	22	(4)
2006–2007	→ Zagorje (loan)	24	(4)
2010	Dravinja	9	(0)
2010	Aluminij		
2011	Drava Ptuj		
2011	SV Horn	1	(0)
2012–2013	Gersthofer SV	23	(8)
2013	Neusiedl	7	(0)
2014	SK Cro-Vienna	8	(3)
2014	KSV-Siemens Großfeld	1	(0)
- * Club domestic league appearances and goals as of 2 January 2024

Antonijo Pranjić (born 14 January 1985) is a Slovenian retired football defender.
