= Javier Dopico =

Spanish footballer

Personal information
- Full name: Javier Dopico Morales
- Date of birth: 22 May 1985 (age 41)
- Place of birth: Málaga, Spain
- Height: 1.81 m (5 ft 11 in)
- Position: Midfielder

Youth career
- Málaga

Senior career*
Years	Team	Apps	(Gls)
2003–2007	Málaga B	33	(1)
2003	Málaga	1	(0)
2005–2006	→ Mérida (loan)	14	(1)
2007–2008	Ibiza-Eivissa	31	(1)
2008–2009	Alhaurino	7	(0)
2009	Atlético Baleares	14	(0)
2009–2011	Ronda	58	(9)
2011–2013	San Pedro	63	(7)
2013–2014	La Roda	26	(1)
2014–2017	Alhaurín Torre	70	(22)
2017–2018	Zenit Torremolinos		

International career
2003	Spain U18	3	(0)
- * Club domestic league appearances and goals as of 3 December 2017

Javier Dopico Morales (born 22 May 1985) is a Spanish former footballer who played as a midfielder.

== Club career ==
Born in Málaga, Andalusia, Dopico graduated from local Málaga CF's youth system, making his senior debut with their reserves in the 2002–03 season, in Segunda División B. On 21 June 2003 he made his first-team – and La Liga – debut, playing the last 17 minutes in a 0–1 away loss against RCD Mallorca; he continued to appear for the former the following years, with a loan to Mérida UD in between.

After being released by Málaga, Dopico competed in the third level and Tercera División, representing UD Ibiza-Eivissa, CD Alhaurino, CD Atlético Baleares, CD Ronda, UD San Pedro, La Roda CF and Alhaurín de la Torre CF.
