= Márcio Tarrafa =

Brazilian footballer

João Márcio Arraes da Silva known as Márcio Tarrafa (born 13 April 1985) is a footballer.

Márcio Tarrafa previously played for Boavista F.C. in the Portuguese Primeira Liga. He also played for Sousa Esporte Clube in the Copa do Brasil.
