= Gabriel Florea =

Romanian footballer (born 1985)

Personal information
- Full name: Gabriel Virgil Florea
- Date of birth: July 12, 1985 (age 41)
- Place of birth: Craiova, Romania
- Height: 1.88 m (6 ft 2 in)
- Positions: Defender; midfielder

Team information
- Current team: FSV Offenbach

Senior career*
Years	Team	Apps	(Gls)
2004–2005	Electroputere Craiova		
2005–2006	FCU Craiova		
2007–2009	Petrolul Berca		
2007–2009	Jiul Petroșani		
2009–2010	Mureșul Deva		
2010–2011	Unirea Dej		
2011–2012	FCM Reșița		
2013–2015	Phönix Bellheim	?	(?)
2015–2016	Germersheim	?	(?)
2016–	FSV Offenbach	4	(0)
- * Club domestic league appearances and goals

Gabriel Virgil Florea (born July 12, 1985) is a Romanian football defender who plays for German lower leagues side FSV Offenbach. Since he was a boy, Florea played for important Liga I teams in Romania such as FCU Craiova (in 2004 and 2005, as a midfield), and Jiul Petroșani, in 2006-07 Liga I season.

At only 18, he was already holder in most of the games he played. In 2007, he has ranked 5th with 5.76 points on a Jiul Petroșani forum.

Since 2007 to 2009, he played almost 100 games in Second League of Romania.
