= Thomas Aupic =

French footballer (born 1985)

Personal information
- Date of birth: February 24, 1985 (age 41)
- Place of birth: [Pau]], France
- Height: 1.77 m (5 ft 10 in)
- Position: Goalkeeper

Senior career*
| Years | Team | Apps | (Gls) |
| 2008–2011 | SR Colmar | 67 | (0) |
| 2011–2012 | RC Strasbourg Alsace | 0 | (0) |
| 2012 | Jura Sud Foot | 3 | (0) |
| 2012–2013 | FC Dieppe | 0 | (0) |
| 2013–2014 | Paris FC | 10 | (0) |
| 2014–2015 | US Ivry | 7 | (0) |
| 2015–2016 | FC Chambly | 21 | (0) |
| 2016–2018 | Paris FC | 4 | (0) |
- * Club domestic league appearances and goals ‡ National team caps and goals as of 8 August 2018

Thomas Aupic (born 24 February 1985) is a French professional footballer who played as a goalkeeper.

== Professional career ==
After a successful start to his footballing career with SR Colmar in the Championnat National, Aupic suffered years of injuries and setbacks including a fibula-tibia double fracture. After nearly giving up football in and taking a part-time teaching job, Aupic joined Paris FC in June 2016. He made his professional debut at the age of 32 for Paris FC in a 2–0 Coupe de la Ligue loss to Clermont Foot on 22 August 2017.

== Personal life ==
Aupic is of Moroccan descent.
