= Mohamed Abdel-Kader =

Syrian footballer (born 1985)

Mohamed Abdelkader
Personal information
- Date of birth: 19 January 1985 (age 41)
- Place of birth: Homs, Syria
- Height: 1.74 m (5 ft 9 in)
- Positions: Defender; midfielder

Team information
- Current team: Ala'ab Damanhour

Senior career*
Years	Team	Apps	(Gls)
2005–2008	Al-Karamah		
2008–2010	Al-Majd		
2010–2012	Hutteen		
2013	Wadi Degla	9	(0)
2014	Ala'ab Damanhour	0	(0)
- * Club domestic league appearances and goals as of 5 September 2013 ‡ National team caps and goals as of 5 September 2013

Mohamed Abdelkader (Arabic: محمد عبد القادر) (born January 19, 1985, in Homs, Syria) is a Syrian footballer. He currently plays for Ala'ab Damanhour, which competes in the Egyptian Premier League, the top division in Egypt.
