= Jacy =

Jacy is a unisex given name. Notable people with the name include:

- Jacy (footballer) (born 1997), Brazilian football player
- Jacy J. Hurst, American judge
- Jacy Reese Anthis (born 1992), American activist
- Jacy Sheldon (born 2001), American basketball player

== See also ==
- Jace
