= José Mari (footballer, born 1985) =

Spanish footballer

Personal information
- Full name: José María Isaac Béjar
- Date of birth: 1 September 1985 (age 41)
- Place of birth: Mérida, Spain
- Height: 1.80 m (5 ft 11 in)
- Position: Left back

Youth career
- 1998–1999: Peña Los Compadres
- 1999–2002: Málaga
- 2002–2003: Espanyol
- 2003–2004: Málaga

Senior career*
Years	Team	Apps	(Gls)
2004–2005	Alhaurino		
2005–2007	Málaga B	16	(1)
2005–2006	→ Melilla (loan)	22	(0)
2006–2007	Málaga	8	(1)
2007–2008	Poli Ejido	1	(0)
2008	→ Valencia B (loan)	2	(0)
2008–2009	Mérida	19	(0)
2009–2010	Logroñés	10	(0)
2010–2012	Marbella	39	(4)
2012–2013	Unión Estepona	7	(1)
2013–2015	Marbella	57	(3)
- * Club domestic league appearances and goals

José María Isaac Béjar (born 1 September 1985), commonly known as José Mari, is a Spanish former footballer who played as a left back.

== Football career ==
Born in Mérida, Badajoz, Extremadura, José Mari made his senior debuts with CD Alhaurino in the 2004–05 campaign, in Tercera División. On 21 August 2005 he moved to Málaga CF, being immediately loaned to UD Melilla in Segunda División B.

José Mari returned to the Andalusians in June 2006, and was assigned to the reserves also in the third level. He played his first match as a professional on 27 August, starting and being booked in a 1–0 away win against Hércules CF in the Segunda División.

José Mari scored his first professional goal on 9 December, netting the last of a 1–1 draw at UD Vecindario. He appeared in eight matches during the season, as the Andalusians narrowly avoided another drop.

On 20 July 2007 José Mari moved to Polideportivo Ejido, also in the second level. After appearing rarely, he was loaned to Valencia CF Mestalla on 15 January of the following year, until June.

José Mari continued to appear in the third and fourth divisions in the following campaigns, representing Mérida UD, UD Logroñés, Marbella FC (two stints) and Unión Estepona CF.
