= Dylan Hughes =

Association football player (born 1985)

Personal information
- Full name: Dylan John Hughes
- Date of birth: 23 January 1985 (age 41)
- Place of birth: Vancouver, Canada
- Height: 1.82 m (6 ft 0 in)
- Position: Forward

Youth career
- 2001–2003: Newcastle United

Senior career*
Years	Team	Apps	(Gls)
2003–2005	1. FC Kaiserslautern II	41	(15)
2005	→ Jahn Regensburg (loan)	7	(1)
2006–2008	RKC Waalwijk	0	(0)
2007–2008	→ VVV-Venlo (loan)	12	(1)
2008–2009	Makedonikos	25	(6)
2010–2012	FT Starnberg 09		

International career
2000	Wales U16		
2003–2004	Canada U20	9	(3)
2005	Wales U21	4	(1)

Managerial career
- 2010–2012: 1860 Munich (C youth)
- 2012–2013: SC Fürstenfeldbruck (Sporting director)
- * Club domestic league appearances and goals

Dylan John Hughes (born 23 January 1985) is a former professional footballer who played as a forward. Born in Canada, he represented both Canada and Wales at youth level.

== Club career ==
Hughes signed for Newcastle United Academy after a successful trial at the young age of 16. Three years later he moved to Germany and signed a professional contract with 1. FC Kaiserslautern. After two years playing for the club's reserves he joined Jahn Regensburg. He signed with Eredivisie side RKC Waalwijk in April 2006, signing a two-year deal, and went in mid-2007 on loan to VVV-Venlo, before he returned in the summer of 2007. He left the Netherlands in summer 2008 and joined Beta Ethniki club Makedonikos and played in 25 games for the club. He was transferred to PAS Lamia 1964 where he played one season. In August 2010, he signed a contract with FT Starnberg 09, as player coach before he retired in May 2012 due to a knee injury.

== International career ==
Hughes was Welsh youth international in U-17 and U-21 level, he was in the squad of Welsh U-16 team at 2001 UEFA European Under-16 Football Championship qualifying. Hughes played his only match for Wales U-21 against Latvia U-21 August 23, 2004, friendly. He also played for Canada U-20 team between October 2003 and December 2004, all friendly. Hughes also included in preliminary squad of 2005 CONCACAF U20 Tournament.

== Coaching career ==
Hughes received his UEFA B level coaching certificate through the Welsh FA. He worked during his coaching career by FT Starnberg, 2010 until 2012 and as Head coach of the C youth from 1860 Munich. In December 2012, he was named as the new Director of Sport by SC Fürstenfeldbruck.
