= Juan Ignacio Acosta =

Paraguayan-born Chilean footballer (born 1985)

Personal information
- Full name: Juan Ignacio Acosta Cabrera
- Date of birth: 8 March 1985 (age 41)
- Place of birth: Santa Rosa, Paraguay
- Height: 1.82 m (5 ft 11 1/2 in)
- Position: Attacking midfielder

Youth career
- Colo-Colo
- Huachipato
- Racing Club

Senior career*
| Years | Team | Apps | (Gls) |
| 2002–2006 | Platense | 45 | (15) |
| 2007 | Fernando de la Mora | 0 | (0) |
| 2007 | Alianza Lima | 10 | (2) |
| 2008 | Sport Colombia | 0 | (0) |
| 2008 | San Martín de Tucumán | 10 | (2) |
| 2008 | Los Andes | 20 | (4) |
| 2009–2010 | Atlanta | 25 | (4) |
| 2010–2011 | Boca Unidos | 1 | (0) |
| 2011–2012 | Acassuso | 12 | (1) |
| 2012 | Defensores Unidos | 8 | (0) |
| 2012 | Lota Schwager | 0 | (0) |
| 2013 | Dock Sud | 14 | (0) |
| 2013 | Luján | 9 | (0) |
| 2013 | Atlético Laguna Blanca | | |
| 2014 | Germinal Rawson | 35 | (6) |
| 2014–2015 | Sportivo Barracas | | |
| 2016 | Deportivo Merlo | 4 | (0) |
| 2016–2019 | Sacachispas | 11 | (0) |
| 2019–2021 | San Martín de Burzaco | 13 | (0) |
- * Club domestic league appearances and goals

Juan Ignacio Acosta Cabrera (born 8 March 1985) is a Paraguayan-Chilean former footballer who played as an attacking midfielder.

== Career ==
As a youth player, Acosta was with Colo-Colo and Huachipato in Chile and Racing in Argentina. Having played most of his career in Argentina, he made his debut playing for Platense at the age of 16. He has also played for San Martín de Tucumán, Los Andes, Atlanta, Boca Unidos, Acassuso, Defensores Unidos, Dock Sud, Luján, Atlético Laguna Blanca, Germinal de Rawson, Deportivo Merlo, Sacachispas and San Martín de Burzaco.

In the 2005–06 season, he won the Primera División B along with Platense, getting promotion to the Primera Nacional. In the 2007–08, he won the Primera B Nacional along with San Martín de Tucumán, getting promotion to Primera División.

In addition, he had brief steps with Fernando de la Mora and Sport Colombia in his country of birth, Alianza Lima in Peru, and Lota Schwager in Chile.

== Personal life ==
He naturalized Chilean by descent since his father is Chilean.

== Honours ==
Platense

- Primera División B: 2005–06

San Martín de Tucumán

- Primera B Nacional: 2007–08
