= Patricio Maldonado =

Chilean footballer (born 1985)

Patricio Maldonado (born 25 March 1985) is a Chilean former professional footballer who played as a midfielder.

== Teams ==
- Colo-Colo 2004
- Universidad de Concepción 2005
- Colo-Colo 2006
- Unión San Felipe 2007
- Deportes Iquique 2008–2009
- San Luis Quillota 2010–2011
