= Vouni =

Vouni: Βουνί (Greek); Vuni (Turkish)
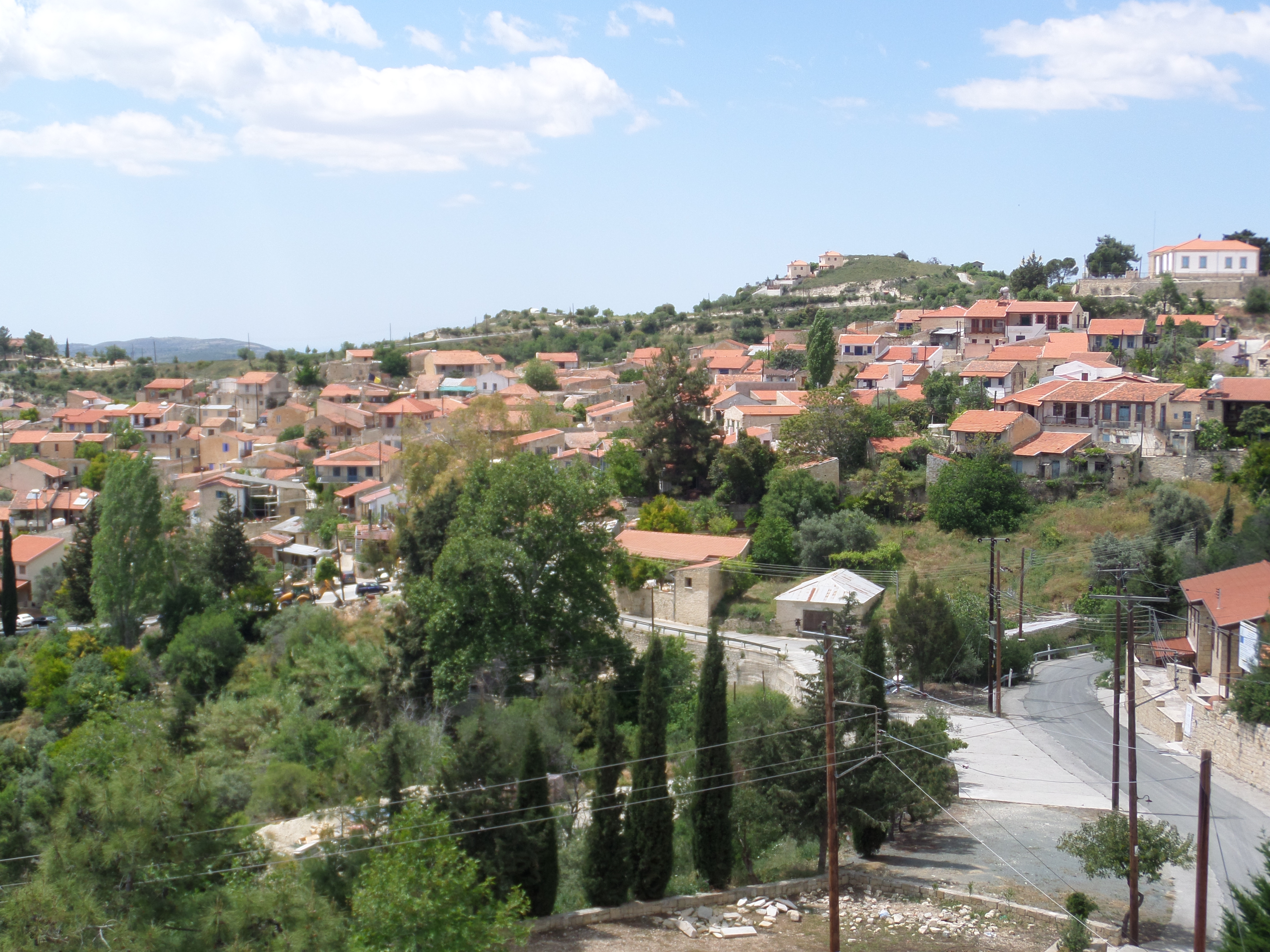

- Location in Cyprus
- Coordinates: 34°49′24″N 32°50′1″E
- Country: Cyprus
- District: Limassol District

Population (2001)
  - Total: 136
- Time zone: UTC+2 (EET)
  - Summer (DST): UTC+3 (EEST)
- Website: http://www.vouni.org

Vouni (Greek: Βουνί, Turkish: Vuni) is a small village in Limassol District, Cyprus, 7 km (4.3 mi) north of Agios Therapon. The name of the village is derived from its location, in which Vouni means "low mountain" in Greek.

== History ==
The earliest recording of Vouni dates back to the Middle Ages, such that it appears in Venetian maps under the name "Voni".

According to local tradition there used to be four settlements in the area of the present village, which were built on low mountains; three of which were known as Pera Vounin (Greek: Πέρα Βουνίν), Velonaka (Greek: Βελόνακα) and Ais Mamas (Greek: Άης Μάμας), which were desolated as a result of the plague which struck Cyprus in 1692. The fourth settlement, Vouni, was salvaged and protected by John the Baptist, to whom the main church of the village is dedicated. Residents of the three settlements that withstood the plague moved to Vouni.

== Excavations ==
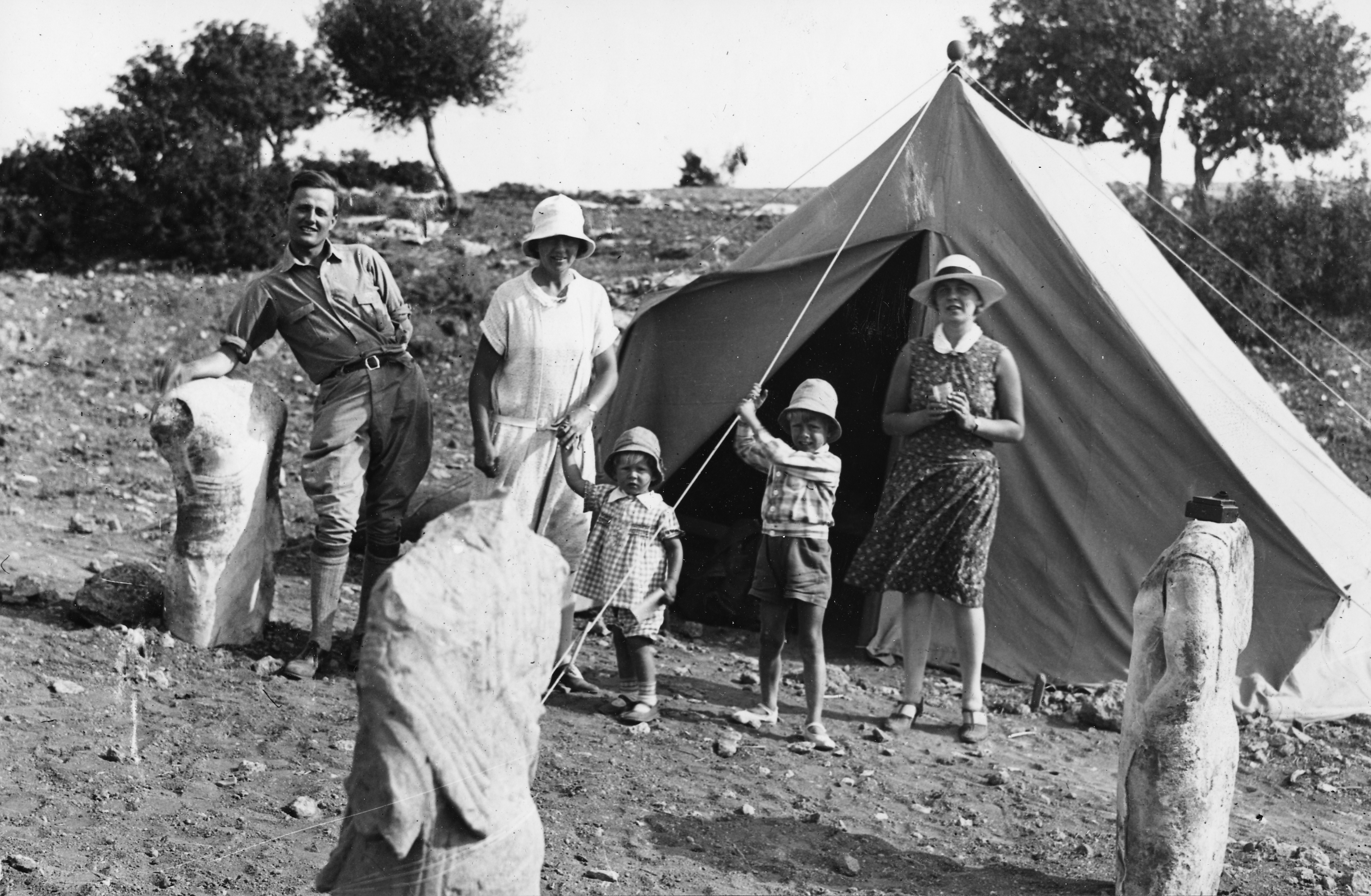
The Gjerstad family. Einar Gjerstad, Vivi Gjerstad and their children, as well as their nanny Gudrun Atterman outside the tents at Vouni.

The Swedish Cyprus Expedition excavated Vouni from spring 1928 to autumn 1929. The site is well situated close to the sea, and with good communication to Marion and Limnitis for example. The ancient road from Soli to Mersinaki and Vouni can easily be traced. The hill was protected by defensive walls with several towers. On the top of the hill there is a temple dedicated to Athena. The Swedish Cyprus Expedition dismissed the theory that Vouni was the ancient Aipeia, the predecessor of Soli, since the site did not reveal any finds earlier than the 5th century B.C. Therefore, the ancient name for the place now called Vouni is not known.

On the terrace below the temple, there is a palace surrounded by various minor sanctuaries. It does not seem like the palace was separated from the temple by a wall or any other construction. Below the palace, they found a strip-shaped necropolis with a few rock tombs. Most of these tombs were open and reminiscent of caves. Below the necropolis they found a rampart where houses similar to the palace were found. People moved between the houses, the necropolis, and sanctuaries with the help of roads and stairs cut into the rock.

=== The Temple of Athena ===
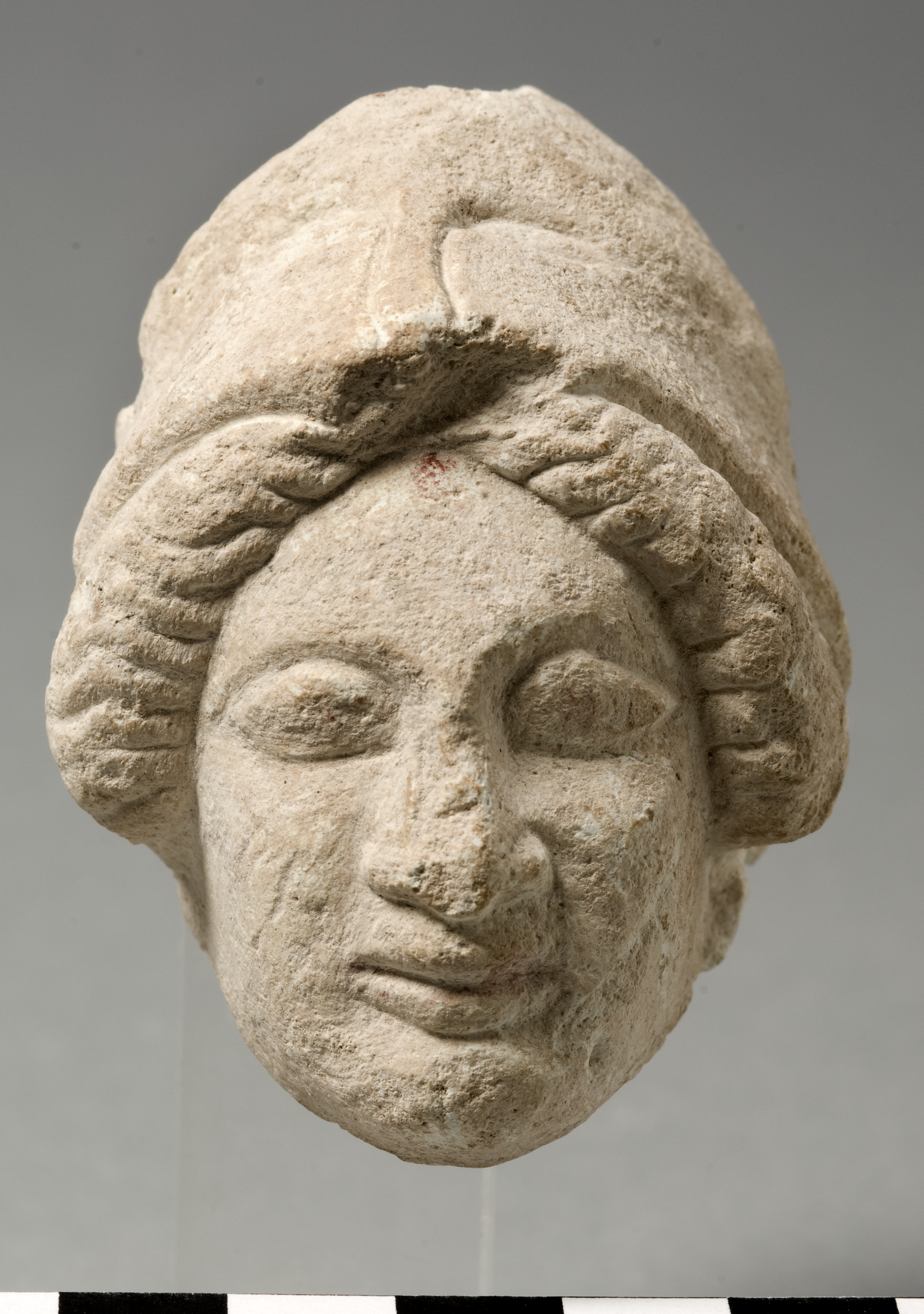
Athena head with a corinthian helmet. From Vouni c. 475 B.C. – c. 325 B.C..

Since the temple's ground had been exposed to weather and wind, only the lowermost part of the walls was preserved. The architectural remains consist of foundation walls and floors of various constructions and compositions. Further, some bases for statues and altars were found. Many of the walls were erected on solid rock and the firm foundation was made of ashlar kept together by gypsum mortar which needed to be created since the rock slopes towards the west.

The temple area's architecture can be divided into three parts. The first is a square building with one room, called room I. The second part called room II consists of walls 58 and creates a rectangular building. The third part consists of rooms V–VII which make up a block of houses built together. It is unclear if they were built during the same period. Between these buildings, there are some courtyards as well, as a kind of forecourt. One of the purposes of the courtyards seems to have been to set up sculptures and some altars. The sculptures represented Athena and were not placed in a specific order. It seems like most of them were placed in the center of the court just next to the entrance. According to the Swedish archaeologists the building with the rooms V–VII seems to have been used as a treasury for votive offerings or something similar.

Since the archaeologists found a bronze bowl with the name Athena inscribed on it, as well as bronze weapons and a lot of sculptures that probably represent the goddess they concluded that this was a temple to the goddess Athena. The sanctuary was created during the first half of the 5th century B.C. After the middle of the century room 1 was added. Nothing indicates when the whole temple site was destroyed or abandoned but there is no archaeological material found ascribed to a later period than the Cypro-Classic II period.

=== The Palace ===
Below the temple there is a building complex called the palace. The palace's stone walls consist of the local limestone of the Vouni rock itself, as well as a light-green homogeneous limestone from Paradisotissa, 1.5 km (0.93 mi) northwest of Vouni. It seems the foundation was built of stone and then the upper walls of mud-brick, although some rooms are built entirely of stone.

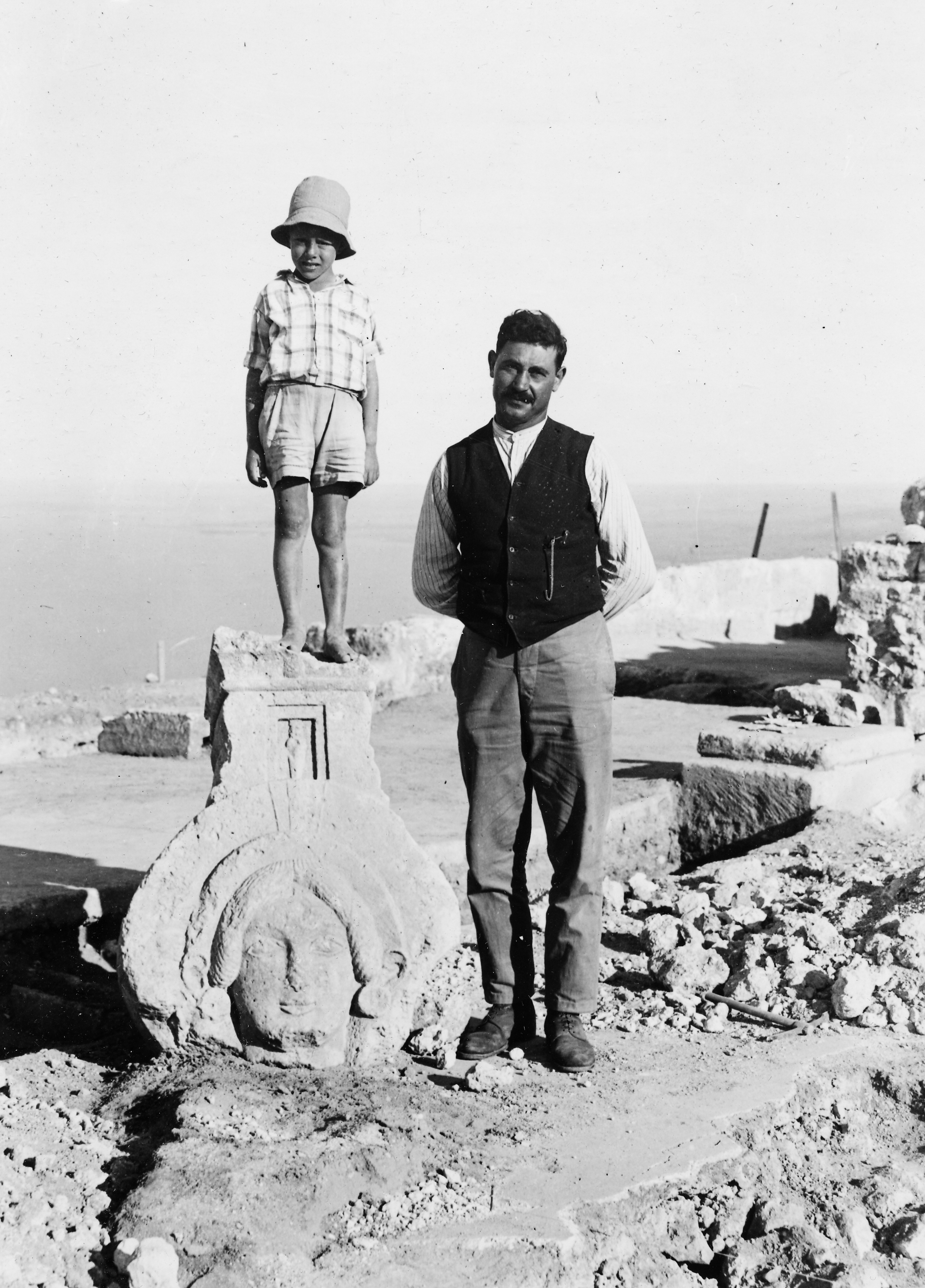
Martin Gjerstad, Lazaros and the column head no. 290. Vouni. Galini.

The palace courtyard had columns to support the roof of the peristyle around the central court as well as the other walls with open fronts. The preserved fragments of the columns are made of the hard limestone of the Vouni rock with stylobates of rectangular slabs of Paradisotissa limestone. The columns are of two types. Type 1 has a cylindrical shaft, while type 2 has the shape of an ellipse. One capital is preserved. This capital has the shape of a Cypriote variety of the Egyptian Hathor capital with a female head sculptured in relief on two sides. She wears rosette earrings and her head is crowned by an arch-shaped diadem. Above her head is a small edifice with an open gate on the façade and a niche with a uraeus in the middle.

The excavators found multiple stairs made of stone blocks that led both to the upper story and the ground floor of the palace. Some stairs were probably made of wood as well. A hearth used for cooking was found on the lower earth floor. The hearth was surrounded by a semicircle made of stones blackened by fire. Further, they found a layer of carbonized matter and ash.

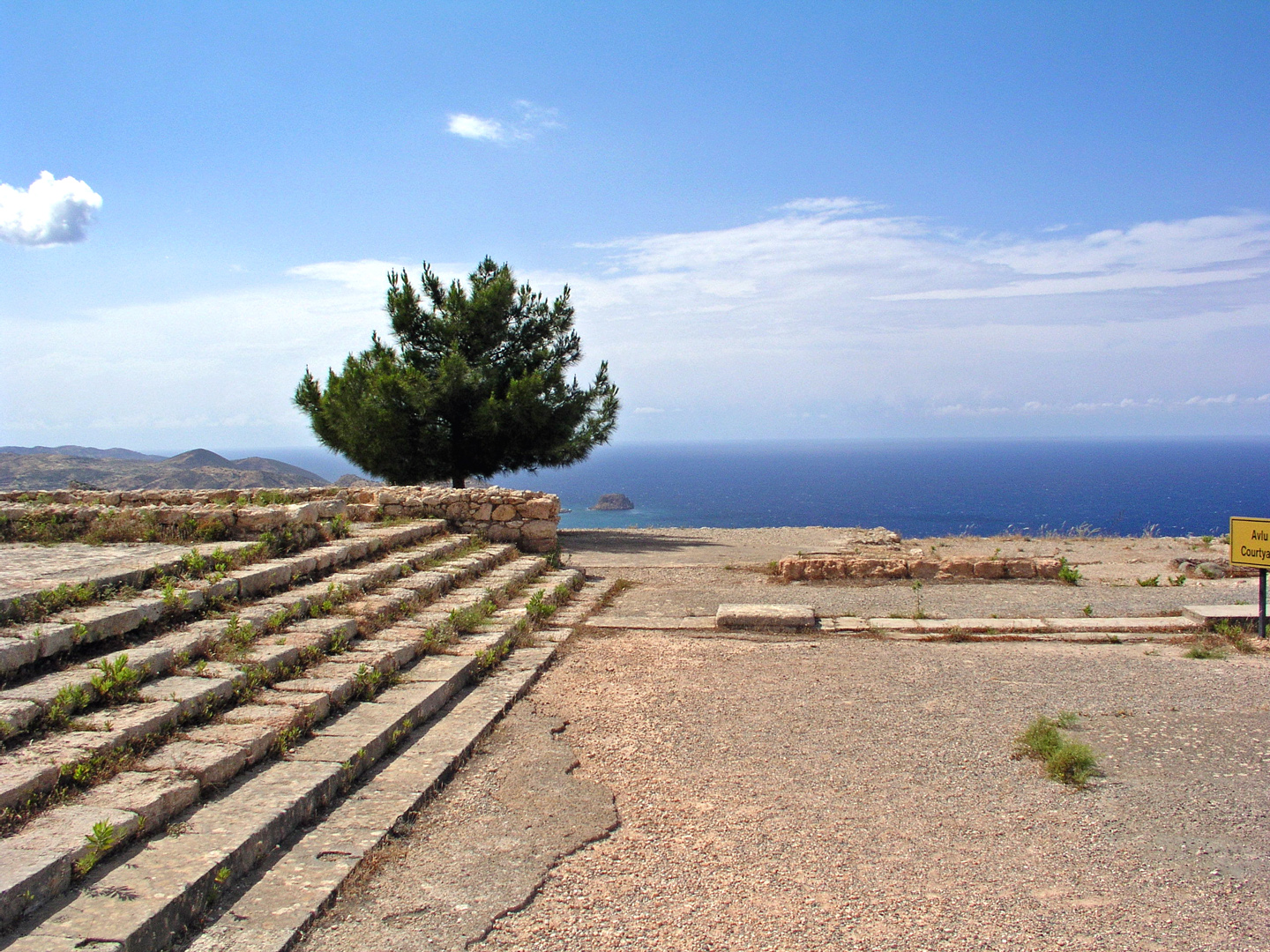
The large stairs of the Vouni palace.

The cisterns found here are of four main types: tank-shaped, well-shaped, bottle-shaped, and bell-shaped. The water was carried to cisterns in conduits of three different types: terracotta pipes, open cemented drains, and cemented drains covered by stone slabs. The first two were used to carry water from the roof meanwhile the cemented, covered drains were used for the conduits below the floors, which opened up into round cemented basins below the floors to the cisterns. The drainage channels carried the rainwater from the open spaces within and outside the palace to the washrooms and bathrooms, as well as the cisterns.

When The Swedish Cyprus Expedition analyzed the palace they concluded that the palace was built in four periods. During the first period (500 to 450–440 B.C.) the main entrance was to the southwest, then the entrance opened up into the state apartments which consisted of a tripartite complex of rooms with a dominating principal room in the middle. The state apartments are placed next to the central court with a magnificent staircase of seven steps. The central court is almost square shaped and surrounded on three sides by a peristyle portico with a roof supported by columns, although the center of the court was open. A cistern at the center of the court collected rainwater. More rooms were built along the court which didn't connect directly with each other. Some of these rooms are bathrooms. The palace had a caldarium where the bathers could be oiled and rubbed and then washed in hot water. After the caldarium, they could continue to the frigidarium where they washed in cold water. The kitchen department consists of small rooms southeast by another open court. Some of the rooms to the northwest are living rooms and storerooms. In two of the storerooms, conical holes are cut into the floor to support large pithoi with pointed bases. The palace of the first period did not have an upper story. Outside the palace, a temenos was constructed with a rectangular altar court as well as some small cult houses. In one of the cult houses the majority of the sculptures were fragments of Heracles figures, therefore the archeologists called it "Chapel of Herakles".

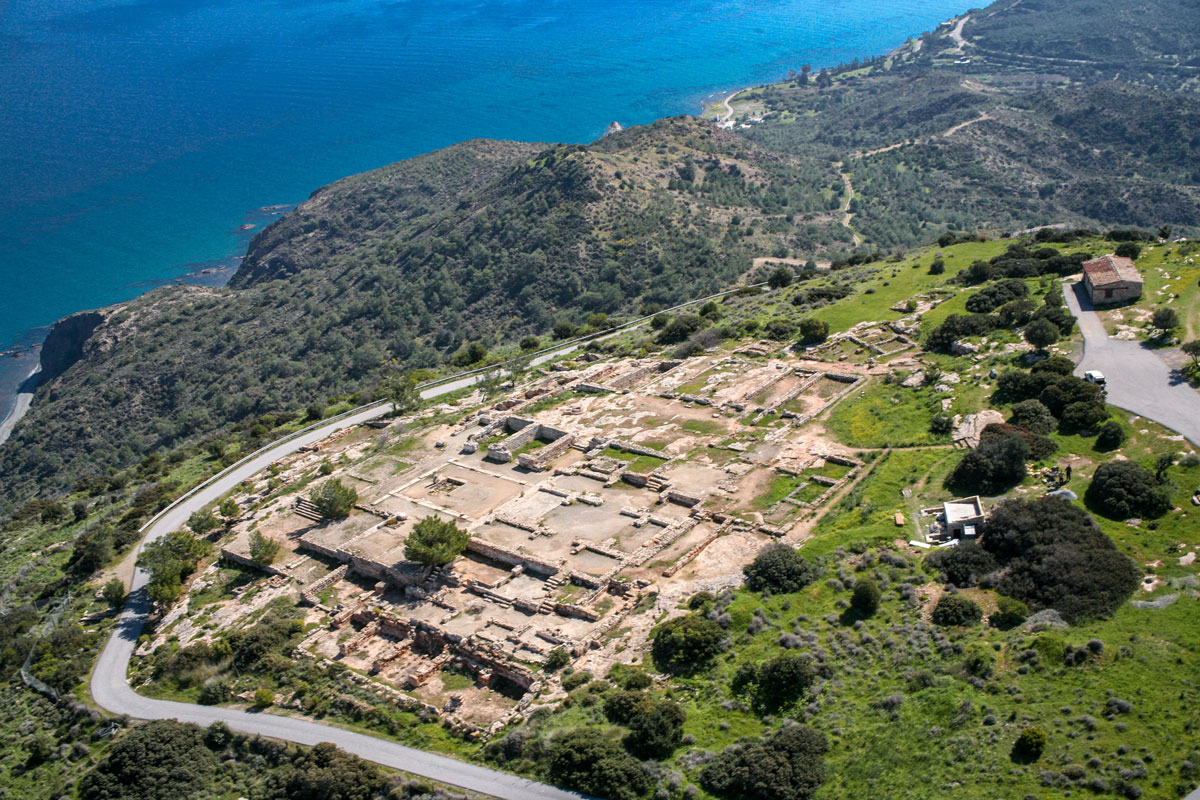
The Vouni palace.

In the second period (500 to 450–440 B.C), a rectangular room and a narrow corridor were added. Inside the wall, the archaeologists found four small boxes made of ashlar blocks as well as ash and carbonized matter and signs of smoke on the blocks, indicating that the boxes were used for firing in some way. They interpreted this structure as a heating room for the room above, which creates something like a sudatorium. One cult-house was added to the south of the palace. Otherwise, the structure stayed the same as in period 1.

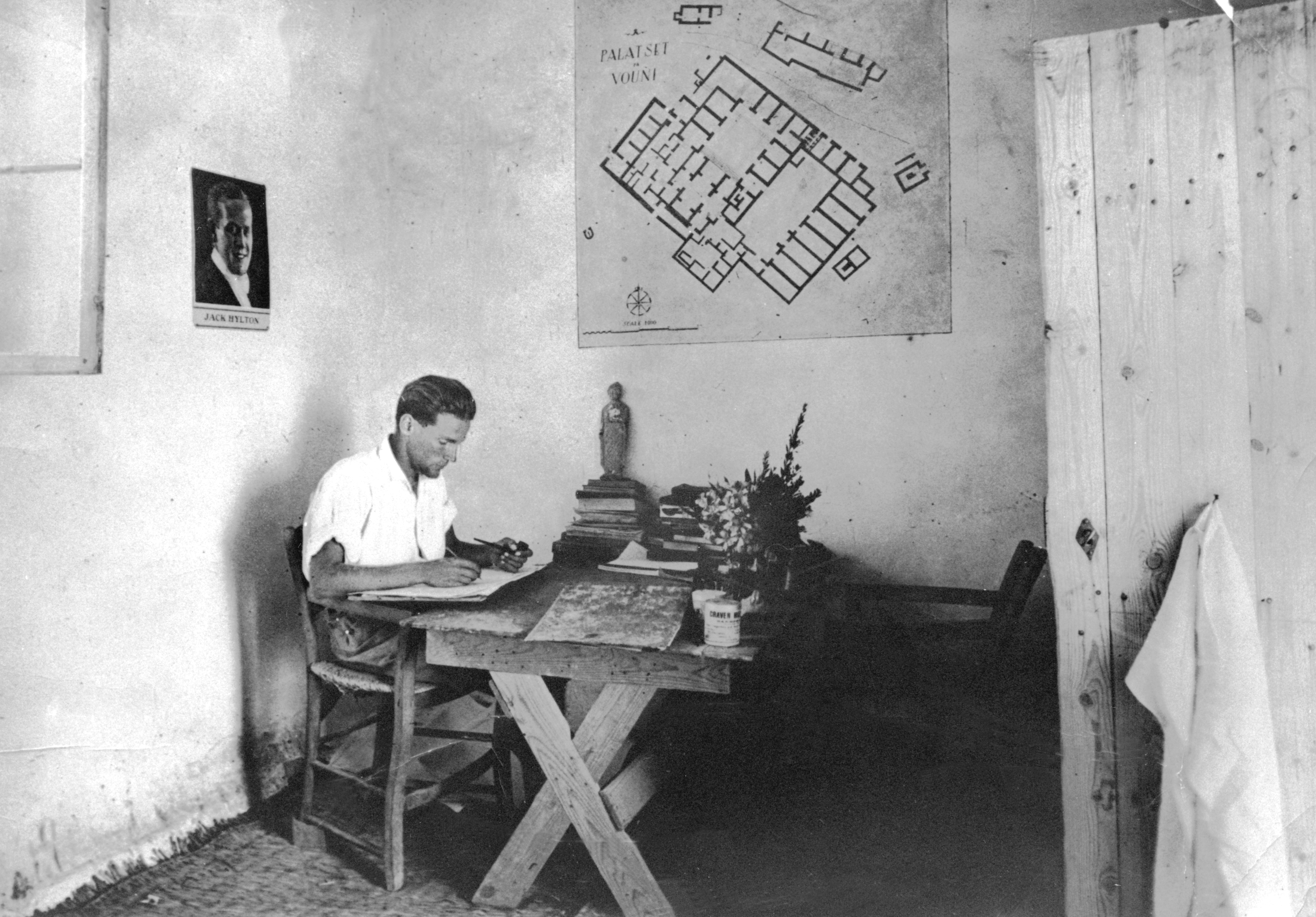
Alfred Westholm at his desk with a map of the Vouni palace on the wall.

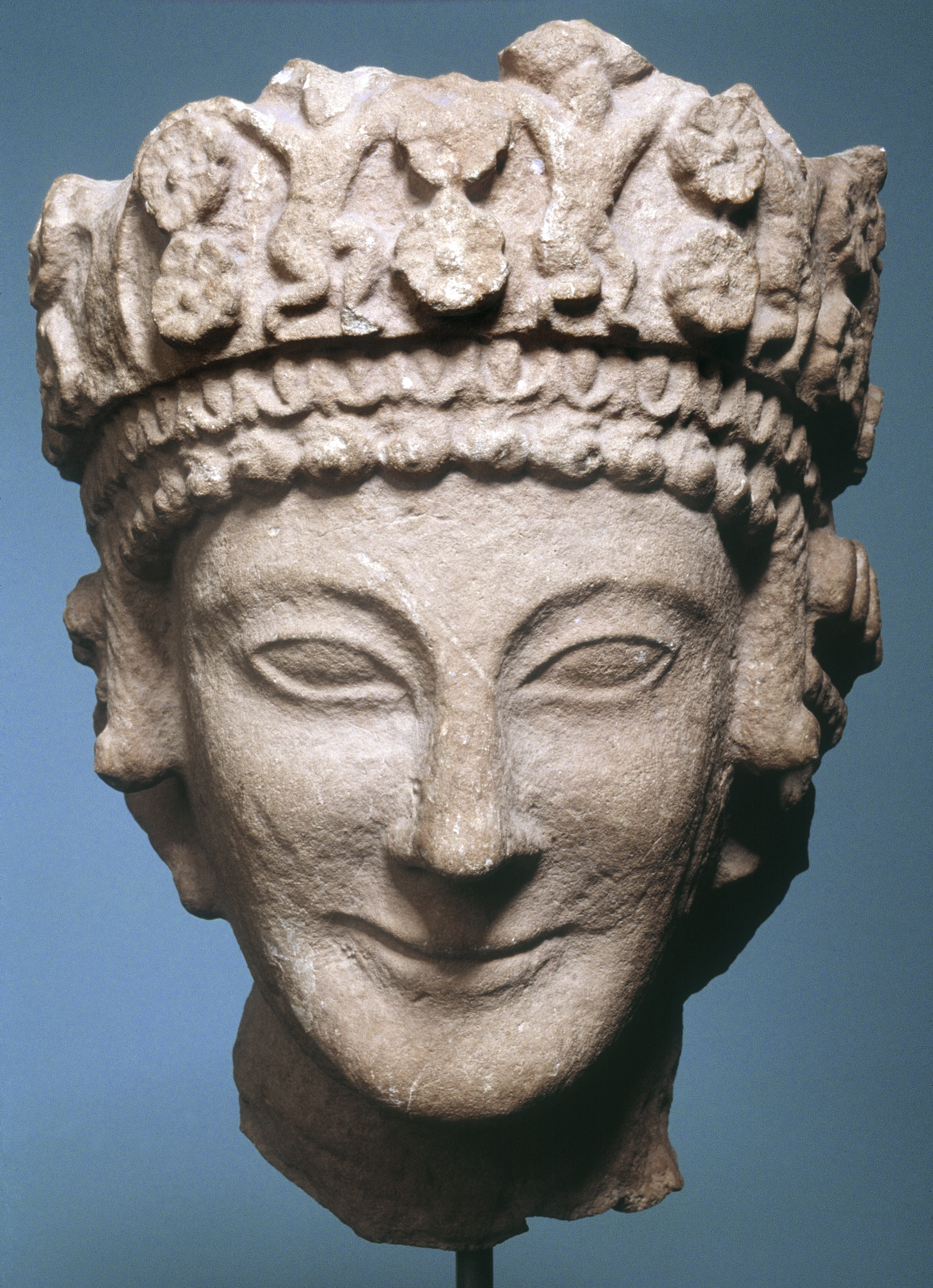
The Vouni head wearing a high diadem/kalathos with dancing figures alternating with double rosettes. Can be seen at Medelhavsmuseet.

Throughout the third period (450–440 to 380 B.C.), the archaeologists concluded that an upper story was added to the palace, and therefore a lot of stairs needed to be added as well. Four new store-rooms were added as well as three more fire chambers. Some of the old parts were rebuilt, the court, for example, was enlarged to almost twice as large as the central court. The kitchen department underwent some enlargements and alterations. A new main entrance with a large and angular vestibule was built by the north corner of the place. With all the changes around the state apartments, their function probably changed. During this period they are reminiscent of a megaron. The overall structure of the palace changed a lot during this period compared to how the palace appeared in period 1. Additionally, the religious buildings outside the palace evolved and new buildings were added. During the fourth and last period (450–440 to 380 B.C.), only minor changes were made at the palace and the temenos.

A lot of stone sculptures have been found at the Vouni Palace or close to it. For example, the famous Vouni head, crowned by a diadem decorated with relief ornaments representing rosettes and dancing figures, as well as a border of kymation ornaments, was found at Vouni. Another example is the life-size Persephone statue which imitates the Ionian-Greek art style. She stands with her left leg advanced, dressed in a chiton and a mantle, the left hand, which is missing, probably held some of the folds. The statue is from the end of the archaic style. Terracotta sculptures were found here as well. Pottery, bowls, jugs, a spindle whorl and loom weight, earrings and other jewelry, and an incense burner were also found.

== Population ==
Year	Size
1881	706
1901	834
1921	1089
1946	1247
1960	990
1976	617
1982	373
2001	137

== See also ==
- Souni-Zanakia
