= Frederik De Winne =

Belgian footballer

Personal information
- Full name: Frederik De Winne
- Date of birth: 28 May 1985 (age 41)
- Place of birth: Dendermonde, Belgium
- Height: 1.82 m (6 ft 0 in)
- Position: Defender

Team information
- Current team: Eendracht Hekelgem (Manager)

Youth career
- Lokeren

Senior career*
Years	Team	Apps	(Gls)
2004–2008	Lokeren	23	(1)
2008	→ OH Leuven (loan)	11	(0)
2008	OH Leuven	12	(0)
2009–2010	Hamme	41	(0)
2010–2011	Standaard Wetteren	27	(3)
2011–2012	Jong Lede	2	(0)
2012–2013	Rapide Lebbeke		
2013–2015	Laarne-Kalken		
2015–2016	TK Meldert		
2016–201?	SK Erembodegem		

Managerial career
- 202?–2022: KVC Asse-Terheide
- 2023–: Eendracht Hekelgem
- * Club domestic league appearances and goals

Frederik de Winne (born 28 May 1985 in Dendermonde) is a retired Belgian footballer who played as a central defender. His prior clubs included Belgian Pro League team Lokeren and Belgian Second Division team OH Leuven.
