= Andrei Pushkarev =

Russian footballer

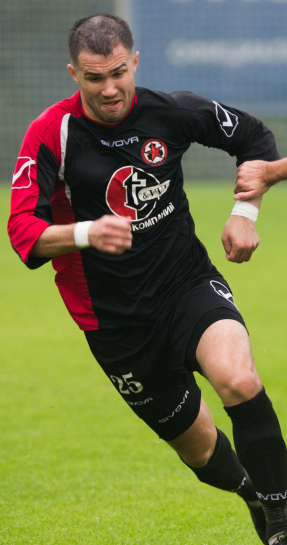

Personal information
- Full name: Andrei Valeryevich Pushkarev
- Date of birth: 15 March 1985 (age 41)
- Height: 1.86 m (6 ft 1 in)
- Position: Defender

Youth career
- 2000–2003: Zenit Saint Petersburg

Senior career*
| Years | Team | Apps | (Gls) |
| 2001–2003 | Zenit Saint Petersburg | 0 | (0) |
| 2003 | → Zenit-2 Saint Petersburg | 11 | (0) |
| 2004 | Krasnodar-2000 | 5 | (0) |
| 2005 | Petrotrest Saint Petersburg | 15 | (0) |
| 2005 | Naftan Novopolotsk | 1 | (0) |
| 2006 | Okzhetpes | 26 | (0) |
| 2007–2008 | Aktobe | 24 | (1) |
| 2009 | Rotor Volgograd | 7 | (0) |
| 2010 | Gornyak Uchaly | 4 | (0) |
| 2010 | Sakhalin Yuzhno-Sakhalinsk | 9 | (0) |
| 2011 | Tyumen | 2 | (0) |
| 2012–2016 | Zvezda Saint Petersburg (amateur) | | |
- * Club domestic league appearances and goals

Andrei Valeryevich Pushkarev (Russian: Андрей Валерьевич Пушкарев; born 15 March 1985) is a former Russian professional footballer.

== Club career ==
He played in the Russian Football National League for FC Petrotrest St. Petersburg in 2005.
