= Jérôme Bigard =

Luxembourgish footballer

Personal information
- Date of birth: 16 February 1985 (age 41)
- Position: Defender

Senior career*
Years	Team	Apps	(Gls)
2002–2005	Union Luxembourg	52	(4)
2005–2006	Racing FC	22	(4)
2006–2009	F91 Dudelange	29	(2)
2009–2010	Racing FC	1	(0)
2010–2016	FC UNA Strassen	44	(3)

International career^{‡}
2007–2011	Luxembourg	8	(0)
- * Club domestic league appearances and goals as of 27 June 2023 ‡ National team caps and goals as of 21 February 2011

Jérôme Bigard (born 16 February 1985) is a retired Luxembourgish international footballer who played as a defender.
