= Angelo Vega Rodriguez =

Swedish footballer and futsal player

Angelo Vega
Personal information
- Full name: Angelo Leonel Vega Rodriguez
- Date of birth: 3 January 1985 (age 41)
- Place of birth: Valparaíso, Chile
- Height: 1.74 m (5 ft 9 in)
- Position: Midfielder

Team information
- Current team: Skoftebyns IF
- Number: 14

Youth career
- IK Svane

Senior career*
Years	Team	Apps	(Gls)
2004–2007	Örgryte IS	20	(0)
2006	→ Qviding FIF (loan)	8	(3)
2008	Qviding FIF	24	(2)
2009–2012	IK Oddevold	77	(7)
2013–2014	IFK Uddevalla	26	(1)
2015	IK Svane		
2017–	Skoftebyns IF (futsal)	5	(2)

International career^{‡}
2012–	Sweden (futsal)	10	(1)
- * Club domestic league appearances and goals as of 30 January 2017 ‡ National team caps and goals as of April 2, 2013

Angelo Leonel Vega Rodriguez (born 3 January 1985) is a Chilean-born Swedish international futsal player and a former football player.

== Futsal ==
Vega plays Futsal for Gothenburg team FC Ibra and for the Sweden national team.

=== International ===
He made his international Futsal debut for Sweden on December 11, 2012, against France.

== Personal life ==
Vega was born in Valparaíso, Chile, and moved to Uddevalla, Sweden, at the age of three along with his family. Later, he naturalized Swedish by residence.
