= Mohamed Haggag =

Egyptian footballer (born 1985)

Personal information
- Date of birth: January 9, 1985 (age 41)
- Position: Defender

Team information
- Current team: Al Nasr

Senior career*
Years	Team	Apps	(Gls)
–2012	El Gouna		
2012–2014	Al Nasr		
2014–2015	Ittihad El Shorta		
2015–	Al Nasr SC		
- * Club domestic league appearances and goals as of 8 September 2017

Mohamed Haggag (Arabic: محمد حجاج; born January 9, 1985) is an Egyptian professional footballer who plays as a defender for Al Nasr. In 2012, Haggag signed a 5-year contract for El Gouna. He was part of the El Nasr squad, which succeeded in being promoted to 2017–18 Egyptian Premier League.
