= Tomasz Bzdęga =

Polish footballer

Personal information
- Full name: Tomasz Bzdęga
- Date of birth: 18 March 1985 (age 41)
- Place of birth: Gostyń, Poland
- Height: 1.85 m (6 ft 1 in)
- Position: Striker

Team information
- Current team: Mieszko Gniezno (assistant)

Senior career*
Years	Team	Apps	(Gls)
- Zjednoczeni Pudliszki
2003–2005	Warta Poznań		
2005–2006	Unia Janikowo		
2006–2008	ŁKS Łomża	59	(9)
2008	Znicz Pruszków	17	(0)
2009–2010	Ruch Wysokie Mazowieckie	53	(9)
2011	KSZO Ostrowiec	17	(3)
2011–2013	Piast Gliwice	24	(1)
2013–2014	Stomil Olsztyn	30	(4)
2014–2015	Gelb-Weiß Görlitz	11	(4)
2015–2016	Pelikan Niechanowo		
2016–2017	Elana Toruń	17	(5)
2017–2020	Mieszko Gniezno		
2019	→ Nielba Wągrowiec (loan)	19	(10)
2020–2021	Nielba Wągrowiec	32	(8)
2021–2024	Mieszko Gniezno	66	(21)

Managerial career
- 2024: Mieszko Gniezno (caretaker)
- * Club domestic league appearances and goals

Tomasz Bzdęga (born 18 March 1985) is a Polish football coach and former player who played as a striker. He is currently the assistant coach of IV liga Greater Poland club Mieszko Gniezno.

== Club career ==
In February 2011, he signed a one-year contract with KSZO Ostrowiec.

In June 2011, he joined Piast Gliwice.

He joined Elana Toruń in July 2016.

== Coaching career ==
In 2024, Bzdęga took on the role of playing assistant coach at Mieszko Gniezno, under head coach Przemysław Urbaniak. After Urbaniak's dismissal on 20 September 2024, Bzdęga took charge of Mieszko on caretaker basis in two matches. Upon the appointment of Kamil Szulc on 30 September, Bzdęga returned to his duties as an assistant.

== Managerial statistics ==
As of match played 28 September 2024

Managerial record by team and tenure
Team	From	To	Record							
Team	From	To	G	W	D	L	GF	GA	GD	Win %
Mieszko Gniezno (caretaker)	20 September 2024	30 September 2024	2	1	1	0	3	1	+2	50.00
Total			2	1	1	0	3	1	+2	50.00

== Honours ==
Piast Gliwice

- I liga: 2011–12

Mieszko Gniezno

- IV liga Greater Poland North: 2017–18
- Regional league Poznań East: 2016–17

Nielba Wągrowiec

- IV liga Greater Poland: 2018–19
