= Luis Rogel =

Chilean footballer (born 1985)

Personal information
- Full name: Luis Alberto Rogel García
- Date of birth: 2 April 1985 (age 41)
- Place of birth: Chaitén, Chile
- Height: 1.85 m (6 ft 1 in)
- Position: Goalkeeper

Senior career*
Years	Team	Apps	(Gls)
2006	Deportivo Luis Musrri		
2007	San Marcos de Arica		
2008–2009	Palestino	26	(0)
2010–2011	Cobresal	41	(0)
2012	Coquimbo Unido	0	(0)
2013	Deportes Linares	0	(0)
- * Club domestic league appearances and goals as of 23 March 2020

Luis Alberto Rogel García (born 2 April 1985) was a Chilean footballer who played as goalkeeper.

He played at Palestino and C.D. Cobresal.

== Honours ==
=== Player ===
San Marcos de Arica

- Tercera División de Chile (1): 2007

Palestino

- Primera División de Chile (1): Runner-up 2008 Apertura
