= Segun Atere =

Nigerian footballer

Personal information
- Full name: Oluwasegun Atere
- Date of birth: 2 November 1985 (age 40)
- Place of birth: Ibadan, Nigeria
- Height: 1.75 m (5 ft 9 in)
- Position: Midfielder

Youth career
- Shooting Stars

Senior career*
Years	Team	Apps	(Gls)
2004–2005	Gent	2	(0)
2005	→ KFC Evergem-Center (loan)		
2005–2007	KFC Evergem-Center		
2007–2013	Kwara United		
2014–2016	Giwa		
- * Club domestic league appearances and goals

Oluwasegun Atere (born 2 November 1985) is a Nigerian former professional footballer who plays as a midfielder.

== Career ==
He began his career with hometown Shooting Stars' feeder team in 2000 before joining the main team. In July 2003 he joined Jupiler League side K.A.A. Gent in a two-year deal. In January 2005, he moved to Belgian lower league team K.F.C. Evergem-Center on loan. He played 2 years and 6 months with the team before moving back to his home country and signing with Kwara United F.C. He signed with NPFL debutants Giwa FC in 2014.

== International career ==
Atere played on the Golden Eaglets squad that won the African U-17 Championship gold medal in Seychelles in 2001. He was also on the national U-20 in 2002 while he was in El-Kanemi and was on the runner-up U-23 team at the 2003 All Africa games hosted by Nigeria.
