= Zâmbia (footballer) =

Brazilian former footballer

Personal information
- Full name: João Marcos Ferreira Andrade
- Date of birth: 25 May 1985 (age 41)
- Height: 1.88 m (6 ft 2 in)
- Position: Right-back

Senior career*
Years	Team	Apps	(Gls)
2007	Profute FC		
2007–2008	Sertanense		
2008	Boavista	17	(0)
2009–2011	Sertanense	13	(0)
2011	→ Mafra (loan)		
- * Club domestic league appearances and goals

João Marcos Ferreira Andrade (born 25 May 1985), known as Zâmbia, is a Brazilian former professional footballer who played as a right-back.

Zâmbia previously played for Boavista F.C.
