= Musaba Selemani =

Burundian footballer

Musa Selemani
Personal information
- Full name: Musaba Selemani
- Date of birth: May 25, 1985 (age 41)
- Place of birth: Bujumbura, Burundi
- Position: Striker

Team information
- Current team: RDC Cointe-Liège
- Number: 9

Youth career
- Prince Louis FC

Senior career*
Years	Team	Apps	(Gls)
2002–2003	Prince Louis FC	37	(5)
2003–2007	FC Brussels	77	(4)
2007–2008	K. Londerzeel S.K.	13	(3)
2008–2009	R. Union Saint-Gilloise	21	(6)
2009–2010	HSV Hoek	25	(2)
2010–2011	RFC Liège	22	(1)
2011–	RDC Cointe-Liège		

International career^{‡}
2002–2007	Burundi	2	(0)
- * Club domestic league appearances and goals as of 12 December 2011 ‡ National team caps and goals as of 27 May 2010

Musaba Selemani (born 25 May 1985 in Bujumbura) is a Burundian footballer who currently plays for RDC Cointe-Liège.

== Career ==
Selemani also played for Prince Louis FC of Bujumbura in Burundi and K. Londerzeel S.K., FC Brussels and R. Union Saint-Gilloise in Belgium. He joined RFC Liège for the 2010/11 season.

== International career ==
He was member of the Burundi national team.
