= Marcos Pereira (footballer, born 1985) =

Paraguayan footballer

Personal information
- Full name: Marcos Gustavo Pereira Ávila
- Date of birth: 25 April 1985 (age 41)
- Place of birth: Asunción, Paraguay
- Height: 1.74 m (5 ft 9 in)
- Position: Midfielder

Youth career
- Sol de América

Senior career*
Years	Team	Apps	(Gls)
2004–2008	Sol de América	57+	(6+)
2009	Jorge Wilstermann	10	(1)
2009	Sportivo Luqueño		
2009–2010	Sol de América	22	(3)
2010	Sportivo Trinidense	1	(0)
2011	Deportes Copiapó	18	(3)
2011–2012	Sportivo Luqueño		
2013	General Díaz		
2013–2014	Cerro Porteño PF		
2014–2016	Deportivo Capiatá		
2016	Estudiantes de Caracas	15	(1)
2017	Sportivo Iteño		
2018	Deportivo Liberación		
- * Club domestic league appearances and goals

Marcos Gustavo Pereira Ávila (born 25 April 1985) is a Paraguayan former professional footballer who played as a midfielder.

== Teams ==
- (Paraguay) Sol de América 2004–2008
- (Bolivia) Jorge Wilstermann 2009
- (Paraguay) Sportivo Luqueño 2009
- (Paraguay) Sol de América 2009–2010
- (Paraguay) Sportivo Trinidense 2010
- (Chile) Deportes Copiapó 2011
- (Paraguay) Sportivo Luqueño 2011–2012
- (Paraguay) General Díaz 2013
- (Paraguay) Cerro Porteño PF 2013–2014
- (Paraguay) Deportivo Capiatá 2014–2016
- (Venezuela) Estudiantes de Caracas 2016
- (Paraguay) Sportivo Iteño 2017
- (Paraguay) Deportivo Liberación 2018
