= Alessandro La Vecchia =

Italian footballer (born 1985)

Personal information
- Date of birth: 19 January 1985
- Place of birth: Italy
- Position: Midfielder

Senior career*
Years	Team	Apps	(Gls)
2000	Orvietana Calcio	0	(0)
2000-2006	Juventus FC	0	(0)
2005/2006	A.S.D. Calcio Ivrea→(loan)		
2006/07	S.S. Teramo Calcio		
2007-2009	A.C. Trento S.C.S.D.		
2009-2010	S.S.D. Domegliara		
2010-2011	S.S. Racing Club Fondi	15	(1)
2011-2012	A.C. Trento S.C.S.D.		
2012	Nakhon Si United F.C.		
2012/2013	Orvietana Calcio		
2015/2016	ACS Viitorul Caransebeș	6	(0)
2016	JK Sillamäe Kalev	6	(2)
2016/2017	A.C.D. Rivoli		(2)
- * Club domestic league appearances and goals

Alessandro La Vecchia (born 19 January 1985 in Italy) is an Italian retired footballer.
