= Jocy Barros =

São Toméan footballer

Personal information
- Full name: Jocy Fernandes Afonso Barros
- Date of birth: 7 August 1985 (age 41)
- Place of birth: Sao Tome and Principe
- Height: 1.80 m (5 ft 11 in)
- Positions: Forward; winger

Senior career*
Years	Team	Apps	(Gls)
- Vitoria Riboque
2008–2009	Carapinheirense		
2009–2010	F.C. Oliveira do Hospital		
2010–2011	Recreio Pedroguense	26	(18)
2011	UD Gandara	1	(0)
2011–2012	AD Figueiró dos Vinhos	24	(19)
2012–2013	Pombal	27	(3)
2013–2014	GD Pampilhosense	37	(27)
2014–2015	Pampilhosa	19	(5)
2015–2016	Uniao Lorvao	16	(7)
2016	FC Universitatea Ordea →(loan)		
- Lusitano Evora
- * Club domestic league appearances and goals

Jocy Fernandes Afonso Barros (born 7 August 1985), known as Jó or Jocy, is a former Santomean footballer.

== Career ==
Barros played with Vitoria Riboque in São Tomé and Príncipe.

=== Portugal ===
While studying at university in Portugal, Barros plied his trade for a number of clubs, including Carapinheirense, Oliviera do Hospital, Pedroguense, Figueiró dos Vinhos, and SC Pombal, moving to GD Pampilhosense in 2013. Racking 17 goals in his first 20 matches for Pampilhosense, Barros thanked the Pampilhosense Fans Group for their support. Upon signing for Pampilhosa, the attacker's objective was to be coach Fernando Niza's first choice in the upcoming season. Over time, while playing in Portugal, he had gotten offers from abroad but declined them, saying that it was too early. In 2014, he indicated a desire to play in play in England or France to learn English or French.

Upon signing for SC Pombal in 2012, the winger expressed thanks to the Pedroguense and Figueiró dos Vinhos supporters for their welcomeness towards him when he played there.

=== Romania ===
Loaned out to Romanian lower-league team FC Universitatea Oradea until the end of the 2016 season, the Santomean made an impact on the league, notching three goals in his first two matches there.

== Post-football career ==
In 2017, soon after announcing his retirement, Barros was appointed sporting director of French regional team Entente Conque Madeleine Victorine.

Barros announced that he would run for the presidency of the São Toméan Football Federation in 2019. He withdrew his nomination before the rescheduled ballot.

In 2025, Barros was involved in running a program for young Santomean footballers called Futebol de Rua.

== Personal life ==
Luis Leal and Jairson Semedo are among Barros' local footballing idols.
