= Quella Vecchia Locanda =

- Origin: Rome, Italy
- Genres: Italian progressive rock, Experimental music
- Years active: 1970-1974

Quella Vecchia Locanda (Italian for "That old inn") or QVL were an Italian progressive rock, symphonic rock or chamber music musical group from Rome formed in 1970. The band released two studio albums, in 1972 and 1974.

Both their studio albums have received favourable reviews.

The band's singer (and flautist) was Giorgio Giorgi. According to an interview with Don V. Lax, the violin player of the first album, "I would find some Bach or Brahms or Corelli and weave it into the music so we were making a classical-rock fusion." As for live performances, "playing at Villa Pamphili for 150,000 people was the most memorable, but we also played for other huge outdoor concerts, on television, and at clubs in Rome and on the coast."

== Related acts ==
Don Lax went on to play violin for artists such as Camper van Beethoven and briefly collaborating with Tim Tompkins of The Moody Blues.

== Discography ==
=== Albums ===
- Quella vecchia locanda (1972)
- Il tempo della gioia (1974)

=== Live ===
- Live (1993, recorded 1971?)

=== Singles ===
- "Villa Doria Pamphili" (1974)
