= Nicosia =

Capital of the Republic of Cyprus

Nicosia Λευκωσία (Greek) Lefkoşa (Turkish) Lefkosia
- Capital city and municipality
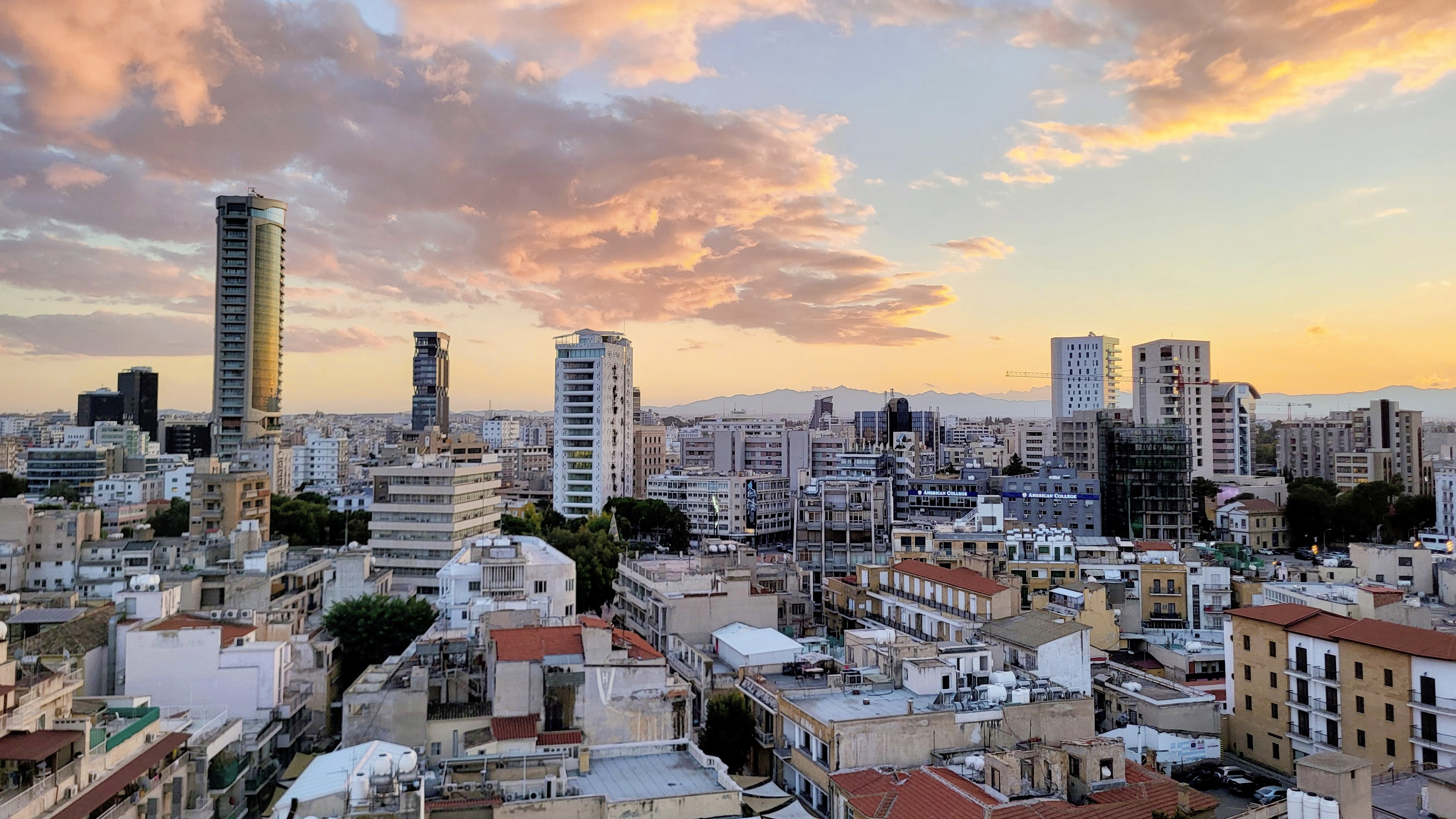
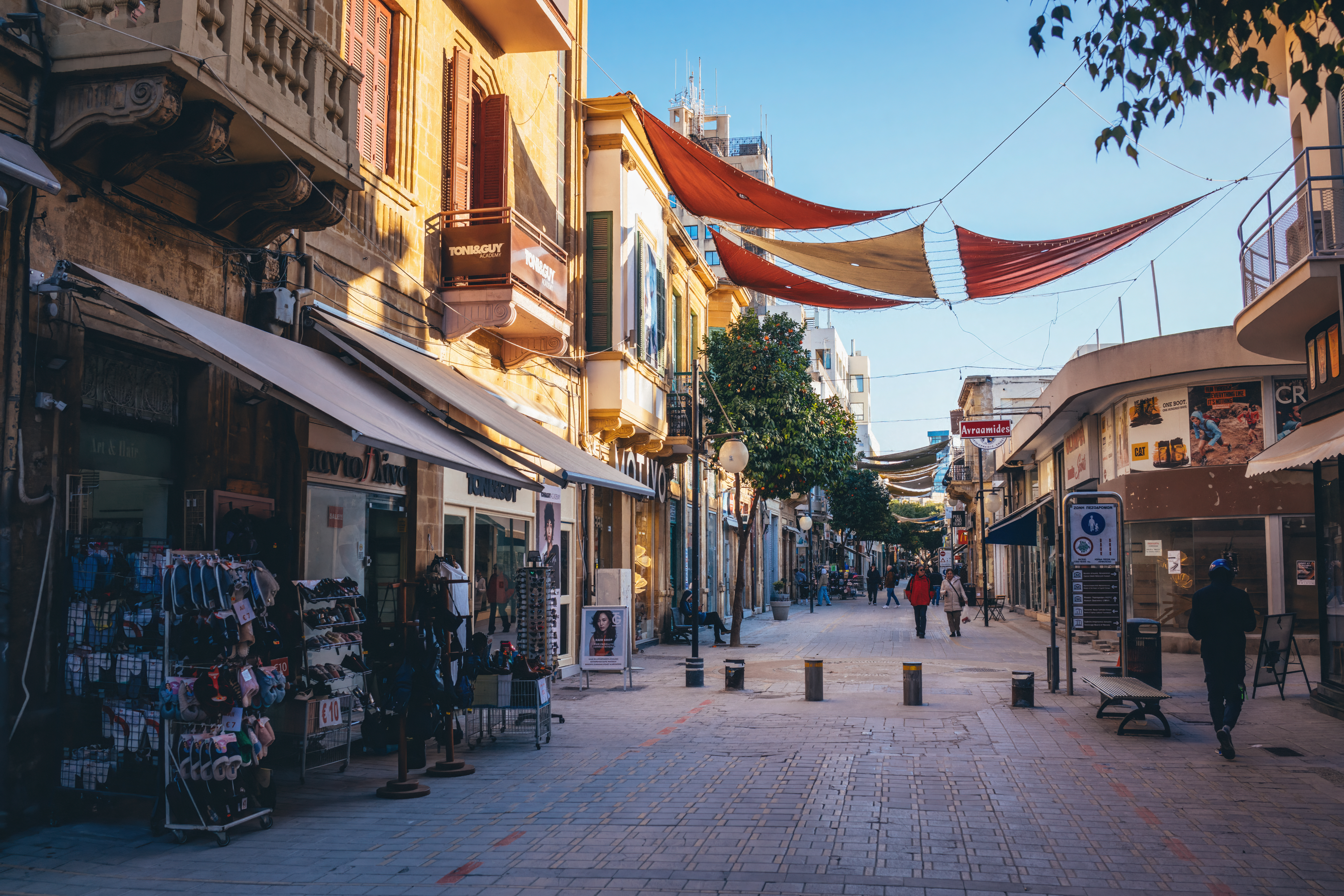
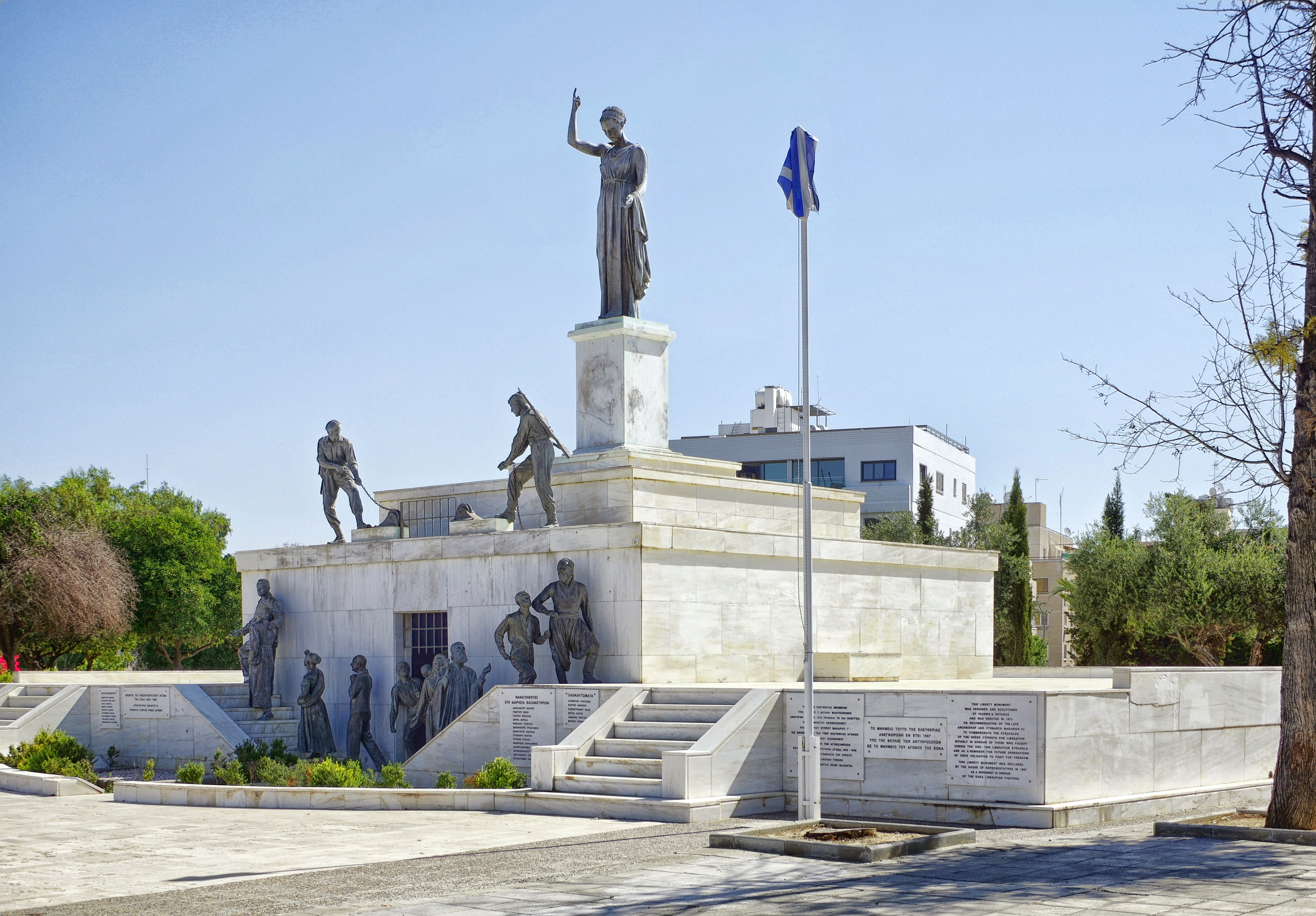
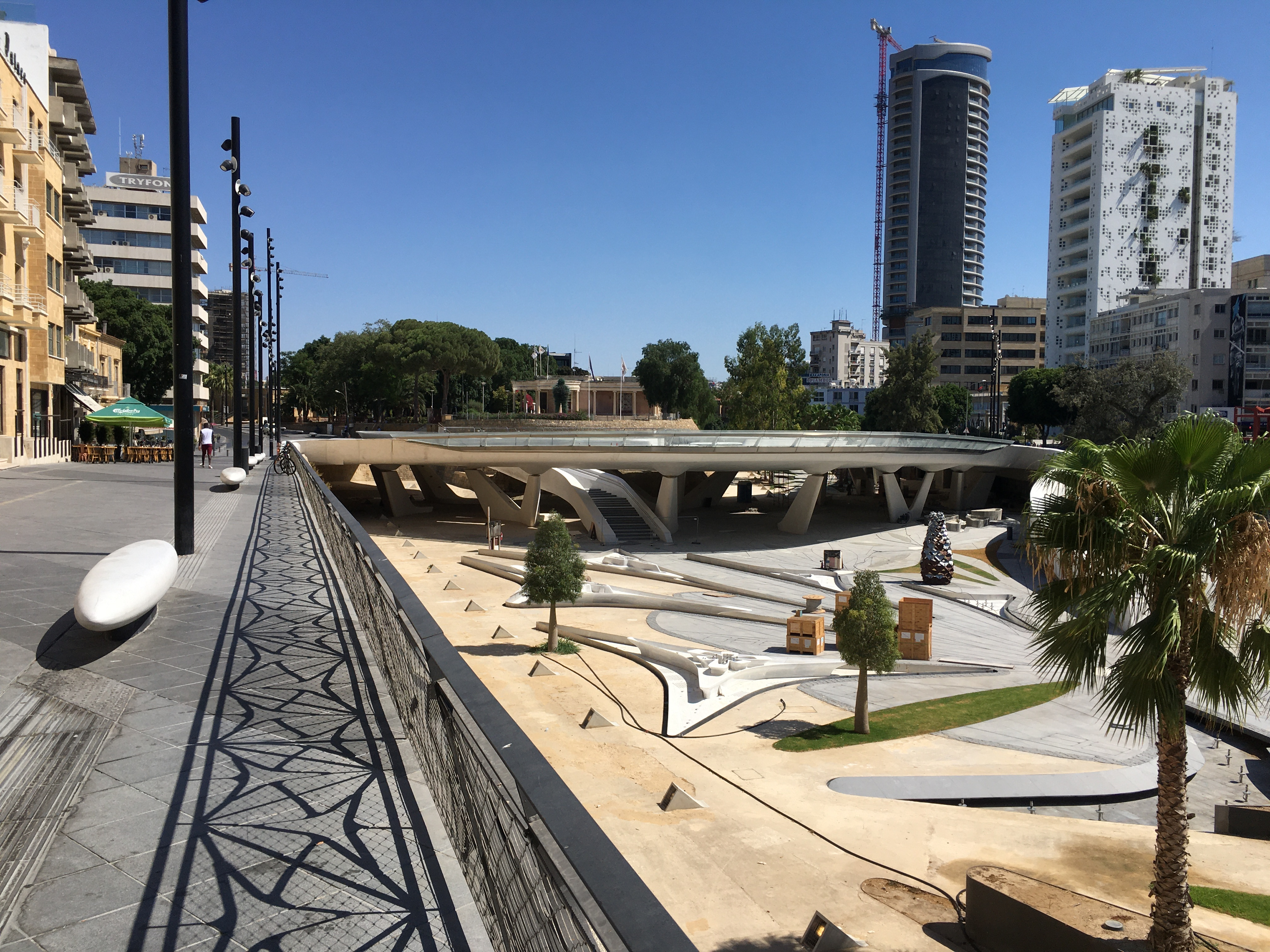
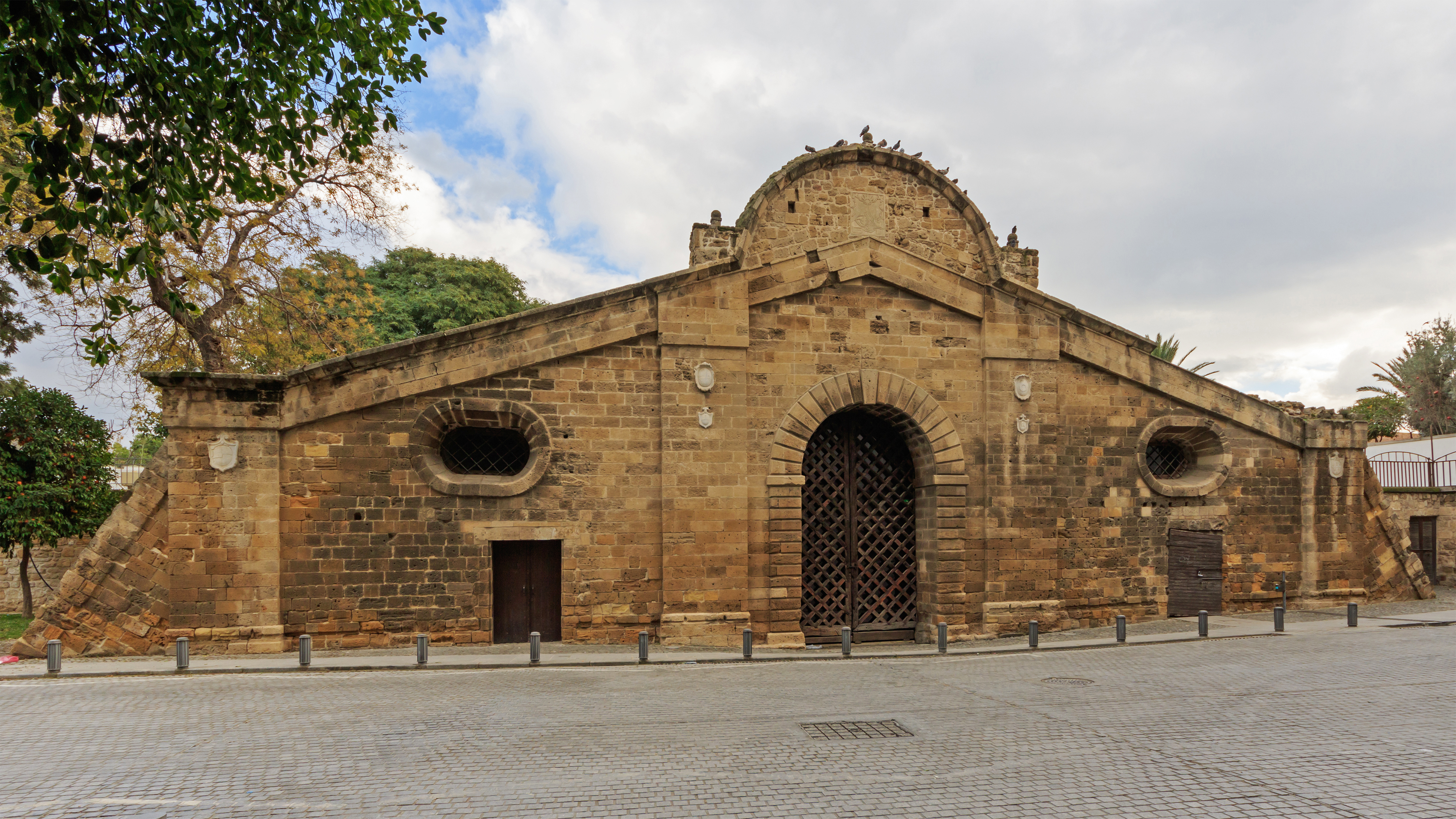
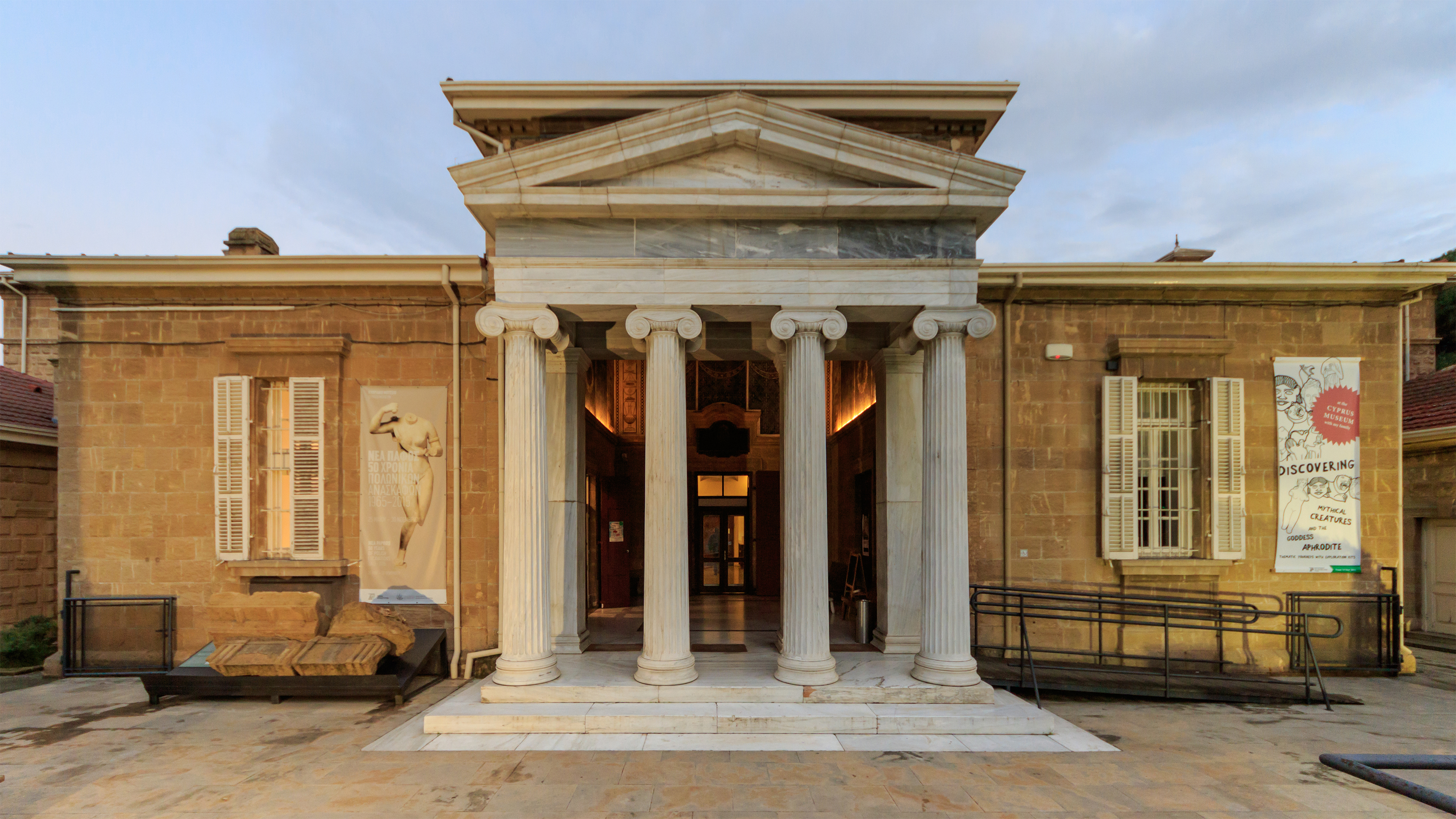
- Nicosia skyline from Shacolas Tower Ledra Street in the Old Town Selimiye Mosque Liberty Monument Eleftheria Square Famagusta Gate Cyprus Museum

- Flag Seal
- Nickname: "Chora" in Greek: "Χώρα"
- Location within Cyprus Location within the European Union
- Coordinates: 35°10′21″N 33°21′54″E
- Claimed by
- Country (de jure): Republic of Cyprus
  - District: Nicosia District
- Country (northern part, de facto): Northern Cyprus
  - District: Lefkoşa District

Government
  - Mayor of Nicosia Municipality: Charalambos Prountzos (Ind.)
  - Mayor of Nicosia Turkish Municipality: Mehmet Harmancı

Area
  - Municipality: 20.08 km^{2} (7.75 sq mi)
  - Urban: 153.11 km^{2} (59.12 sq mi)
  - Municipality (North): 51.87 km^{2} (20.03 sq mi)
  - Urban (North): 165.6 km^{2} (63.9 sq mi)
- (Note: The former area of the municipality of the Republic of Cyprus, before the merger.)
- Elevation: 220 m (720 ft)

Population (2021, 2011 (North))
  - Municipality: 111,797
  - Rank: 2nd municipality, 1st urban in Cyprus
  - Urban: 256,119
  - Urban density: 1,672.8/km^{2} (4,332.5/sq mi)
  - Municipality (North): 61,378
  - Urban (North): 82,929
  - Urban (North) density: 500.8/km^{2} (1,297/sq mi)
- (Note: South Nicosia's urban area includes the municipalities of Nicosia (south), Agios Dometios, Egkomi, Strovolos, Aglantzia, Lakatameia, Anthoupolis, Latsia and Yeri. The north's includes North Nicosia, Gönyeli, Gerolakkos and Kanli.)
- Demonym(s): Nicosian(s) (en); Lefkosiatis, (masc.), Lefkosiatissa (fem.) (gr), Choraitis, (masc.), Choraitissa (fem.) (gr, colloquial)
- Time zone: UTC+2 (EET)
  - Summer (DST): UTC+3 (EEST)
- Post code: 1010–1107
- Area code: 22
- ISO 3166 code: CY-01
- Website: (Nicosia) www.nicosia.org.cy; (North) www.lefkosabelediyesi.org

Nicosia, (Note: /ˌnɪkəˈsiːə/ nik-ə-SEE-ə.) also known as Lefkosia or Lefkoşa, (Note: Greek: Λευκωσία, romanised: Lefkosía, pronounced [lefkoˈsi.a]; Turkish: Lefkoşa, pronounced [lefˈkoʃa].) is the capital of Cyprus. It is the southeasternmost capital city among European Union member states. Its northern part is the de facto capital of Northern Cyprus.

Nicosia has been continuously inhabited for over 5,500 years and has been the capital of Cyprus since the 10th century. It is the last divided capital in Europe. Three years after Cyprus gained independence from British rule in 1960, the Bloody Christmas conflict between Greek Cypriots and Turkish Cypriots triggered island-wide intercommunal violence, and in 1964, Nicosia's Greek Cypriot and Turkish Cypriot communities segregated into the south and the north of the city, respectively. A decade later, in 1974, Turkey invaded Cyprus just days after a Greek junta-backed coup aimed to unite the island with Greece. Following the invasion the island was split between Cyprus in the south and a Turkish-occupied zone in the north, with the dividing line running through Nicosia.

Apart from its legislative and administrative functions, Nicosia has established itself as the island's financial capital and its main international business centre. In 2018, Nicosia was the 32nd richest city in the world in relative purchasing power. In the 2022 Globalisation and World Cities (GaWC) ranking, Nicosia was classified as a Beta− city.

== Names ==
The earliest known external written reference to the settlement that later became Nicosia, appears in an Assyrian inscription from the reign of King Esarhaddon (r. 681–669 BC), where it is recorded as Lidir on a clay prism dated to c. 672 BC. Lidir appears to have been the local form of the name and was later variously Hellenised as Ledra (Ancient Greek: Λήδρα, Lḗdra), Ledrae (Λέδραι, Lédrai), Ledroi (Λήδροι, Lḗdroi), and Ledron (Λεδρῶν, Ledrō̂n, and Λῆδρον, Lē̂dron).

By late antiquity, early Christian sources recorded the location under several Greek names: Leuteon (Λευτεῶν, Leuteō̂n), Leucon (Λευκῶν, Leukō̂n), Leucotheon (Λευκοθέον, Leukothéon), Leucoi Theoi (Λευκοί Θεοί, Leukoí Theoí), and Leucopolis (Λευκούπολις, Leukoúpolis). These names incorporate elements of the Greek words for "white" (λευκός, leukós) or "poplar" (λεύκη, leúkē) and for "God" (Θεός, Theós), "god" (θεός, theós), or "goddess" (θεᾱ́, theá), possibly alluding to either a supposed son of Ptolemy I Soter or the sea goddess Leucothea. During the Byzantine period, the form Leucosia (Λευκουσία, Leukousía) became common; it is usually interpreted as meaning "the white estate" (ἡ λευκή οὐσία, hē leukḗ ousía). This form later developed into modern Greek Lefkosia (Λευκωσία, Lefkosía, [lefkoˈsi.a]) and Turkish Lefkoşa ([lefˈkoʃa]).

The Latin and English name Nicosia emerged during the medieval Lusignan period, around the same time that the Cypriot port of Limassol replaced its initial N with an L for similarly unclear reasons. Hill cites several earlier examples of interchanging /l/ and /n/ as far back as the Phoenician Cypriots, and suggests that this shift may reflect variation in native pronunciation. The name is also preserved in the Armenian as Nikosia (Նիկոսիա) and in Cypriot Arabic as Nikusiya (نيكوسيا).

The town is also recorded as Callinicesis (Καλλινικησις, Kallinikēsis) or Καλλινεικησις (Kallineikēsis) in certain hagiographies of Saints Tryphillius and Spyridon (fl. 4th century).

== History ==
=== Prehistoric Nicosia ===
Nicosia has been continuously inhabited since approximately 2500 BC, near the onset of the Bronze Age, when the first settlers established themselves in the fertile Mesaoria plain.

The city-state of Ledra is likewise associated with the area of Nicosia, most Mycenaean-era ruins are found on the broad hill of Ayia Paraskevi, also known as Leondari Vounò located 6 km (3.7 mi) southeast of central Nicosia. Ledra is said to have been one of the twelve kingdoms of ancient Cyprus established by the Achaeans after the end of the Trojan War. The kingdom was soon destroyed. A Cypriot vassal polity, transcribed as Lidir in a 672 BC Assyrian text, is generally identified with the remains found closer to the site of the modern city. Its ruler Onasagoras (Unasagusu in Assyria form) is recorded as having paid tribute to the Assyrian king Esarhaddon.

=== Ancient Nicosia ===
By 330 BC, Ledra is recorded as a small town of little significance. The settlement was thought to be economically and politically dependent on the nearby town of Chytri. Farming was the principal occupation of its inhabitants. During this period, Ledra did not experience the substantial growth that was seen in the other Cypriot coastal towns, which was largely driven by trade. Some sources state that it was restored and improved around 280 BC by Leucos, son of Ptolemy I Soter of Egypt, although Hill dismissed this claim as an early modern "fancy" based solely on pseudo-etymological speculation.

By the 4th century, the town had become the seat of a bishopric known as Ledron, Leuteon, or Leucotheon. Its bishop Saint Triphyllius was a student of Saint Spyridon. Archaeological evidence indicates that the town regained much of its earlier significance in the early Christian period, and that the presence of two or three basilicas with opus sectile decoration, along with marbles decorated in high relief, indicates the presence of a relatively prosperous and sophisticated Christian society.

=== Medieval Nicosia ===
Following the destruction of Cyprus's capital, Salamis, during Arab raids in 647, and the extensive damage inflicted on other coastal settlements, the island's economy became more internalised, and inland towns gained in relative significance. Nicosia benefited from this shift, functioning as an outlet for agricultural products from its hinterland, the Mesaoria plain. It was further advantaged by its ample water supply. Consequently, the town developed sufficiently for the Byzantine Empire to select Nicosia as the capital of the island around 965, when the Byzantine navy restored full imperial control over the island and organised it as a theme. The Byzantines moved the island's administrative seat to Nicosia primarily for security reasons, as coastal towns were frequently targeted by raids. From that point on, it remained the capital of Cyprus and served as the seat of the Byzantine governor. The last governor was Isaac Komnenos, who declared himself emperor on the island and ruled from 1183 to 1191. Testimony as late as 1211 indicates that Nicosia was not yet a walled a city, indicating that the Byzantines did not construct substantial fortifications, likely considering that the city's inland location would be sufficient for defence purposes. The Byzantines did, however, build a relatively weak fort within the city. Under Byzantine rule, the economy relied largely on trade in agricultural goods, but the town also produced luxury items and metal ware due to the presence of the imperial administration.

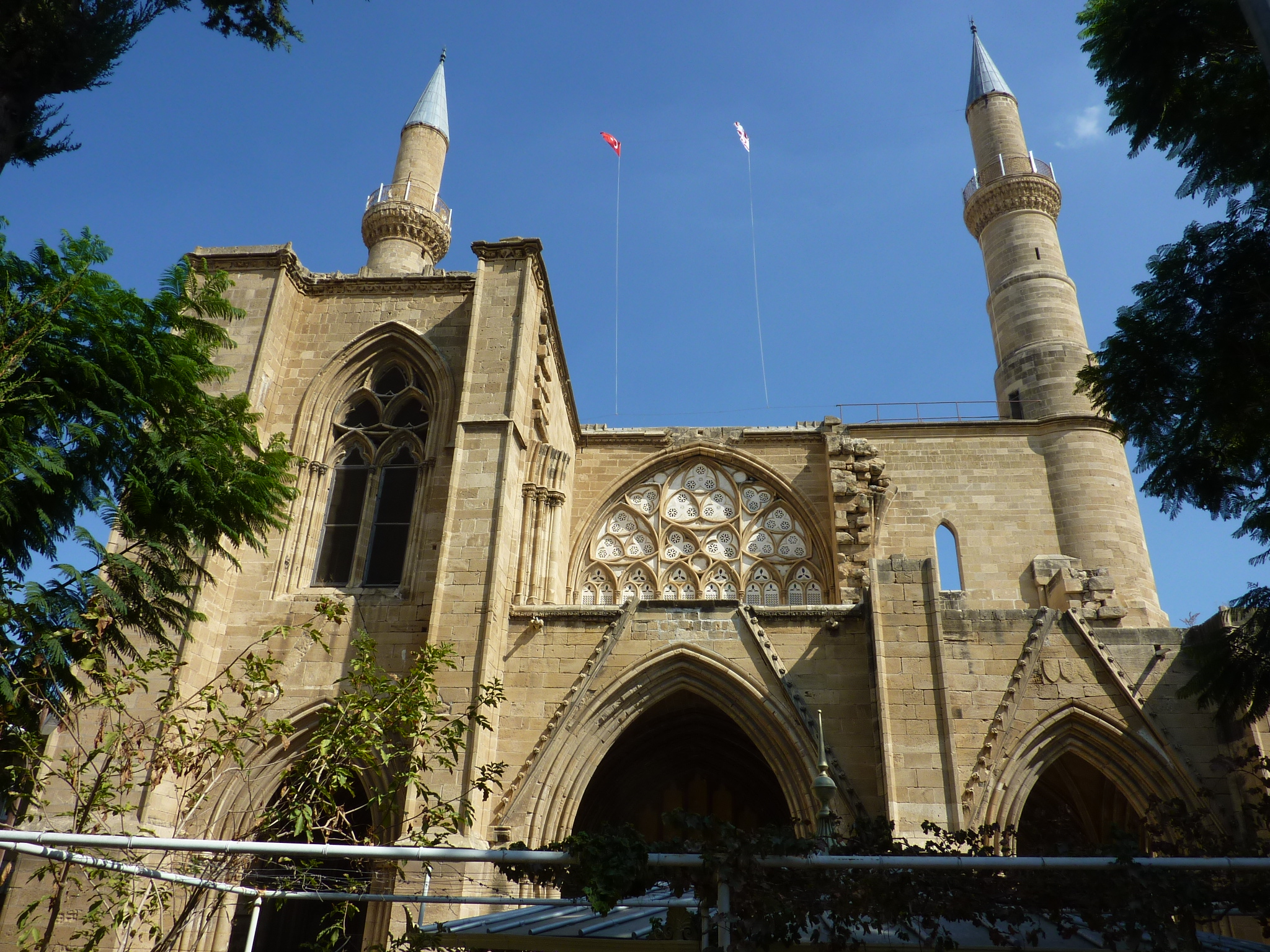
St. Sophia Cathedral, which was built during rule by the House of Lusignan and later converted into the Selimiye Mosque, exemplifies the Gothic architecture in Nicosia.

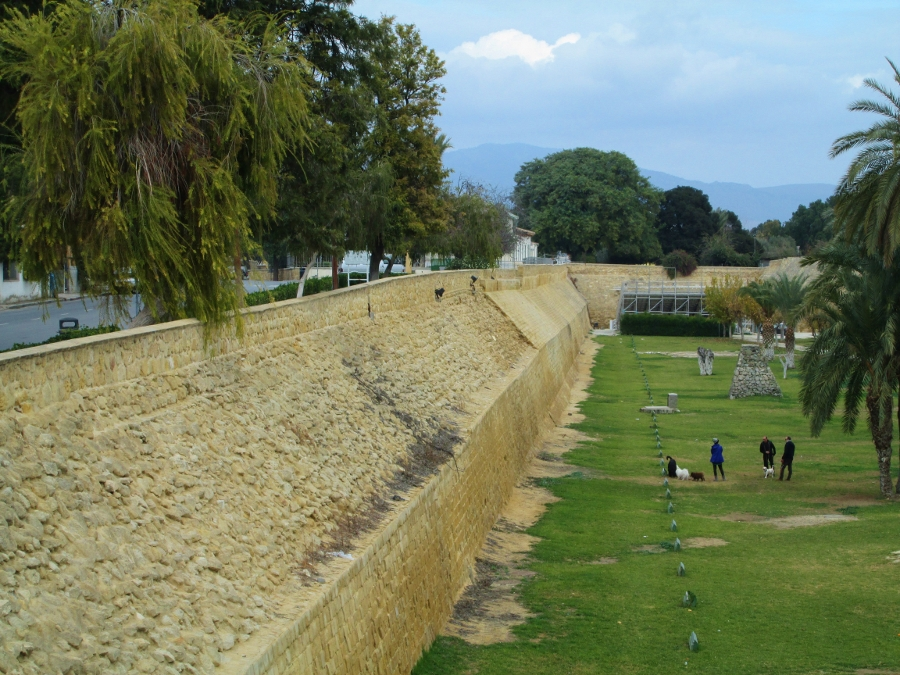
Venetian walls of Nicosia

On his way to the Holy Land during the Third Crusade in 1189, Richard I of England's fleet was plagued by storms, forcing him to stop first at Crete and then at Rhodes. Three ships continued onward, including one carrying Joan of England, Queen of Sicily and Berengaria of Navarre, Richard's bride-to-be. Two of the ships were wrecked off the coast of Cyprus, but Joan and Berengaria's vessel reached Limassol safely. Joan refused to come ashore, fearing she would be captured and held hostage by Isaac Komnenos, the ruler of Cyprus and an enemy of the Franks. Fearing a hostile reception, the survivors remained at anchor off the coast for a full week until Richard's arrival on 8 May. Outraged by the perceived hostility towards his sister and his future bride, Richard invaded. Richard besieged Nicosia, defeated Komnenos at Tremetousia and took control of the island, before selling it a short while later to the Knights Templar.

Frankish rule of Cyprus lasted from 1192 until 1489. During this period, Nicosia served as the capital of the medieval Kingdom of Cyprus, and as the seat of the Lusignan kings, the Latin Church and the island's Frankish administration. The walls of the city were constructed during this era, along with numerous palaces and public buildings, including the gothic Cathedral of Saint Sophia. The tombs of the Lusignan kings are also located here.

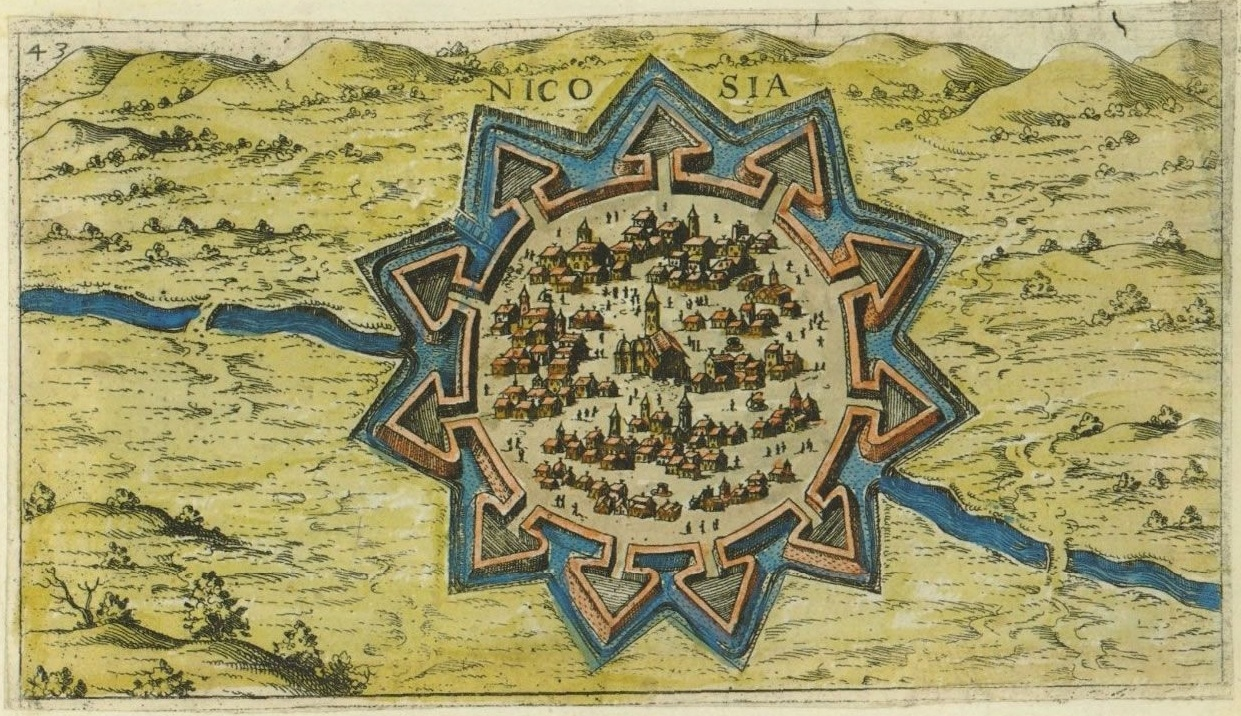
Map of Nicosia in Cyprus, created in 1597

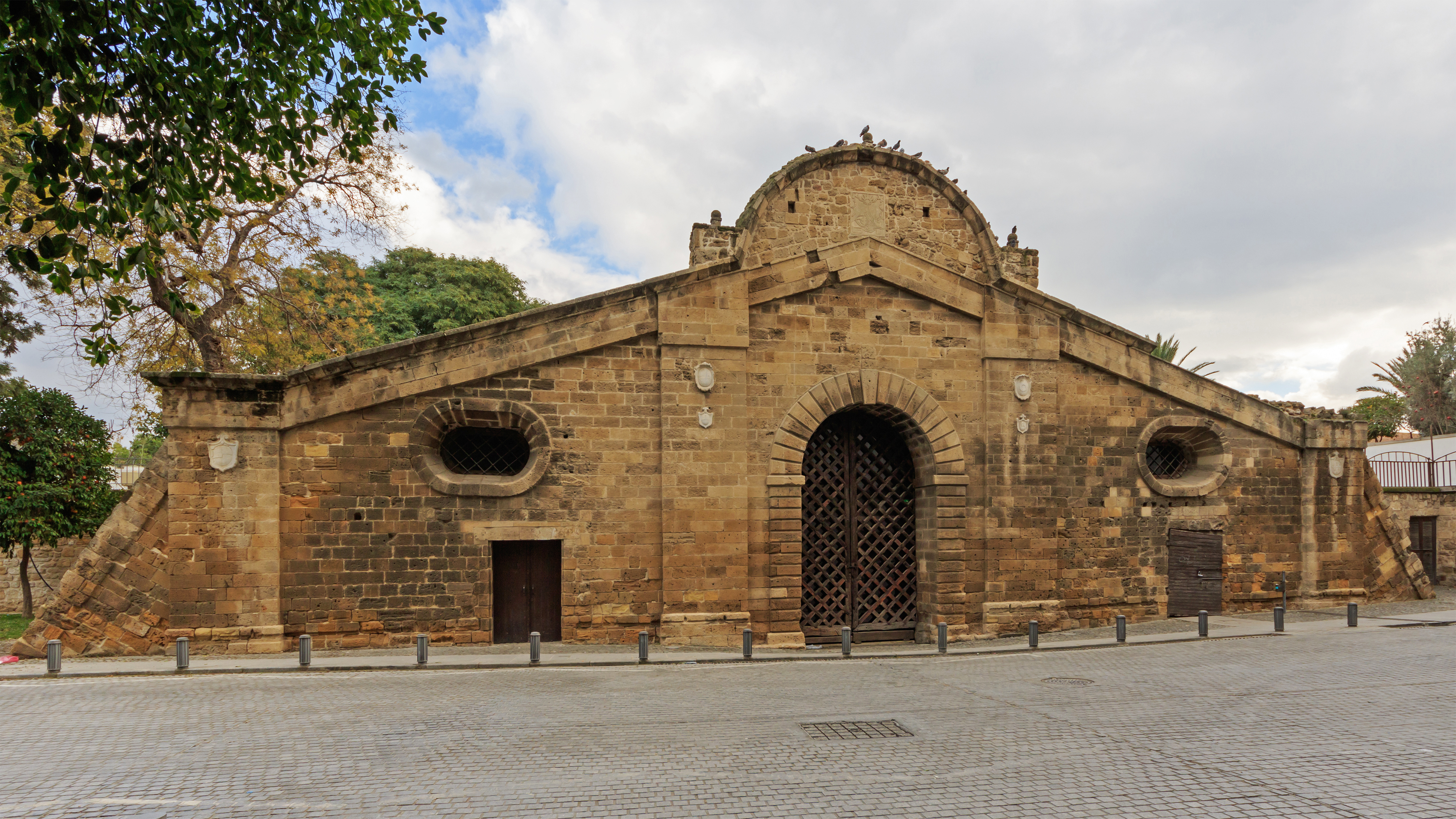
Famagusta Gate built in 1567

In 1373/1374, Nicosia was occupied and ravaged by the Republic of Genoa and again in 1426 by the Mamluk Sultanate.

In 1489, when Cyprus came under the rule of the Republic of Venice, Nicosia became the island's administrative centre and the seat of the republic. The Venetian governors considered it necessary for all the cities of Cyprus to be fortified because of the growing Ottoman threat. In 1567 the Venetians constructed new fortifications around Nicosia—which are well-preserved to this day—demolishing the old walls built by the Franks, as well as other important buildings of the Frankish era including the King's Palace, other private palaces and churches and monasteries of both Orthodox and Latin Christians. The new walls took the shape of a star with eleven bastions. The design was better suited to artillery warfare and allowed defenders greater control over the city's defences. The walls have three gates: Kyrenia Gate to the north, Paphos Gate to the west, and Famagusta Gate to the east. The Pedieos River once flowed through the Venetian walled city. In 1567, it was diverted outside the newly built moat for strategic reasons, in anticipation of the expected Ottoman attack.

=== Ottoman rule ===
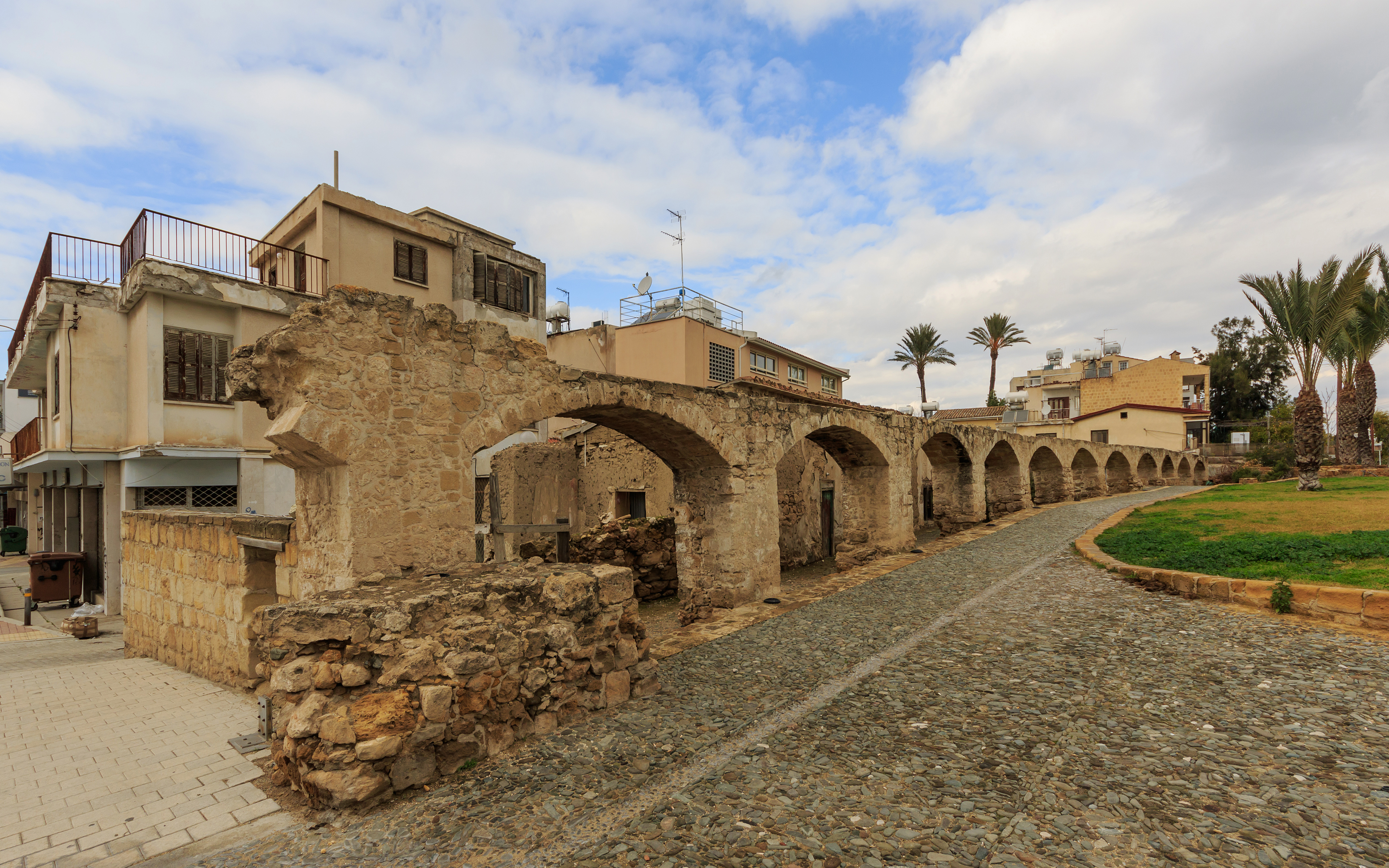
The Nicosia aqueduct

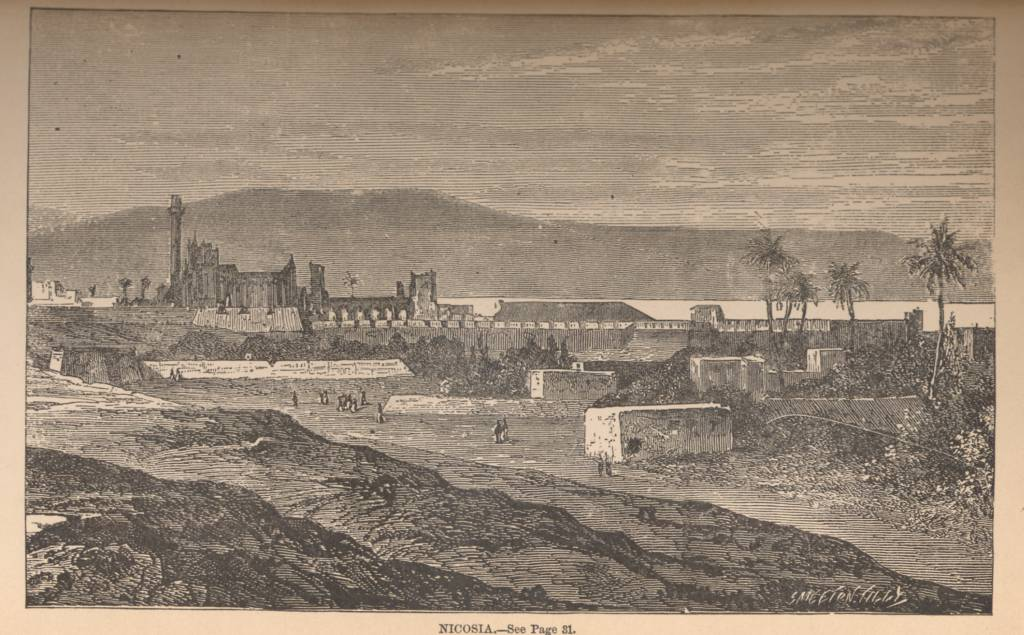
View of Nicosia in 1878

On 1 July 1570, the city came under Ottoman rule. On 22 July, having captured Paphos, Limassol and Larnaca, Piali Pasha marched his army towards Nicosia and laid siege to the city. The city withstood the siege for 40 days before falling on 9 September 1570. The story of the Cypriot martyr Arnaude de Rocas dates back to the fall of Nicosia. Approximately 20,000 residents died during the siege, and nearly every church, public building, and palace was looted. Nicosia had an estimated population of 21,000 before the Ottoman conquest, but Ottoman census data from 1572, indicate the population had fallen to between 1,100 and 1,200. The devastation was so extensive that for several years after the conquest, some villages on the island had larger populations than Nicosia. The principal Latin churches were converted into mosques, including the Cathedral of Saint Sophia.

Nicosia served as the seat of the pasha, the Greek archbishop, the dragoman, and the qadi. The Venetian-era Palazzo del Governo became the residence of the pasha, the governor of Cyprus, and the building was renamed to the konak or seraglio (saray). The square outside became known as Seraglio Square or Sarayönü (literally "front of the Saray"), a name it retains today. The saray was demolished in 1904 and the current block of government offices were built on the site.

The newly settled Turkish population generally occupied the north of the old riverbed. Greek Cypriots remained concentrated in the south, where the Archbishopric of the Orthodox Church was located. Other ethnic minorities, such as the Armenians and Latins came to be settled near the city's western entrance at Paphos Gate.

The names of the 12 quarters into which Nicosia was originally divided after the Ottoman Conquest are said to derive from the 12 generals who commanded divisions of the Ottoman army at the time. Each general was posted to a quarter, which - with two exceptions - was known by his name:

1. General Ibrahim Pasha.
2. General Mahmoud Pasha.
3. General Ak Kavuk Pasha (a nickname meaning "white cap").
4. General Koukoud Effendi.
5. General Arab Ahmed Pasha.
6. General Abdi Pasha, known as Chavush ("Sergeant") from which rank he was probably promoted.
7. General Haydar Pasha.
8. General Karamanzade (son of a Caramanian; other names not recorded).
9. General Yahya Pasha (now known as the Phaneromeni Quarter).
10. General Daniel Pasha (the quarter was later renamed Omerie in honour of Caliph Omar, who is said to have stayed there for one night while in Cyprus).
11. Tophane (Artillery Barracks)
12. Nebetkhane, meaning police station or quarters of the patrol.

The names of the generals in command of the last two quarters are unknown:

The number of neighbourhoods was later increased to 24. Each neighbourhood was organised around a mosque or church, inhabited primarily by corresponding Muslim and Christian communities.

=== British rule ===
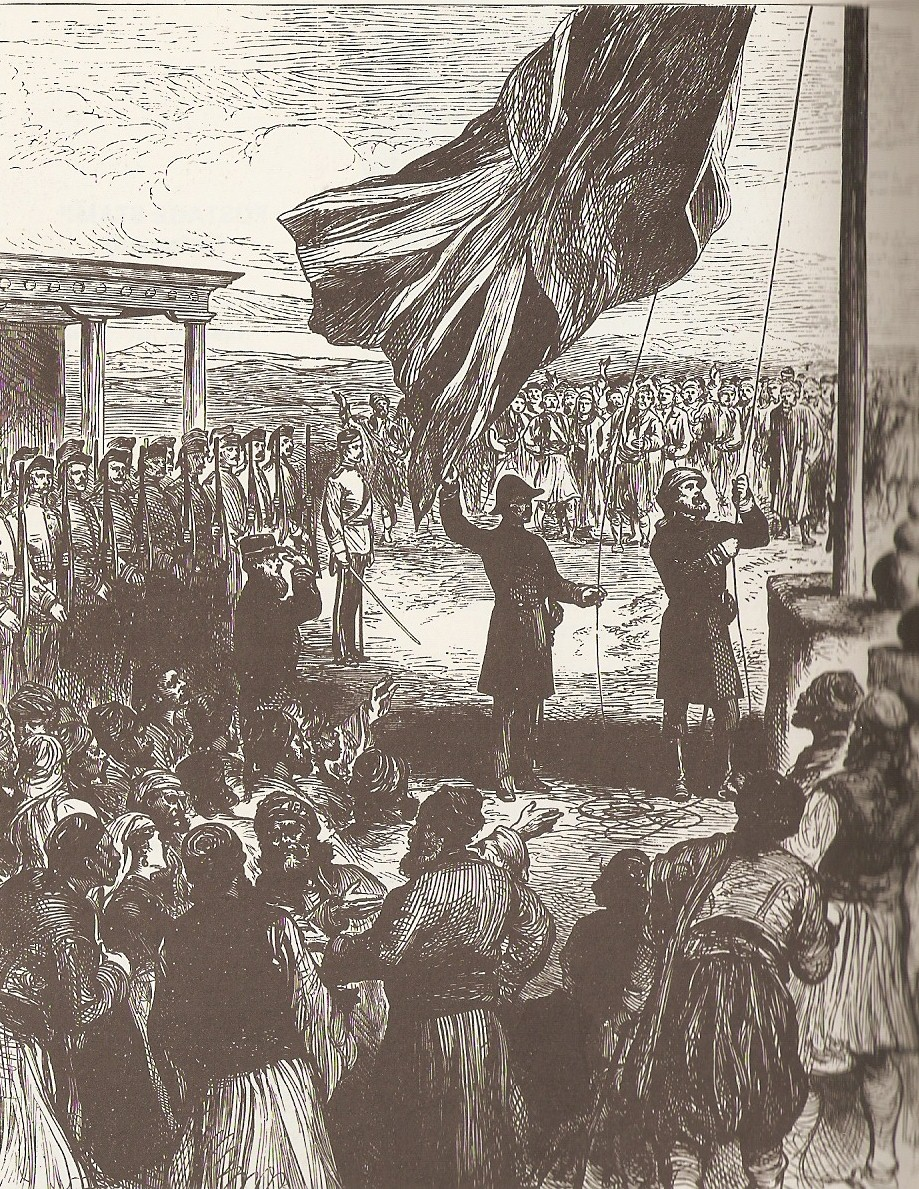
Hoisting the British flag in Nicosia

Historical population
Year	Pop.	±%
1881	11,536	—
1891	12,515	+8.5%
1901	14,481	+15.7%
1911	16,052	+10.8%
1921	11,831	−26.3%
1931	23,324	+97.1%
1946	34,485	+47.9%
1960	45,629	+32.3%
Source for 1881–1960.

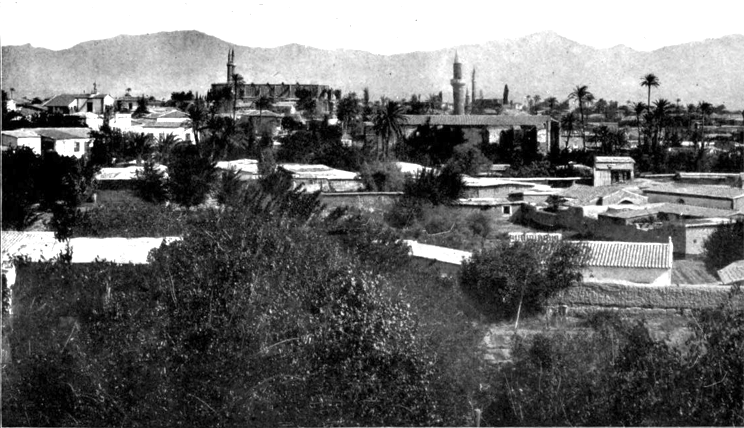
View of Nicosia in 1914

Nicosia came under British rule on 5 July 1878, following of the Cyprus Convention, under which Britain agreed to support the Ottoman Empire at the Congress of Berlin.

The old Ottoman administrative headquarters (the saray) was replaced in 1904 by a new building housing the law courts, land registry, and offices of the forestry, customs, and Nicosia commissioners. Adjacent was the Nicosia Police Headquarters, while opposite were the General Post Office and the telegraph office. A Venetian column, previously in a fenced courtyard near the saray, was relocated and restored in the summer of 1915 in the middle of Saray Square. The Nicosia column is believed to have been erected in honour of the reigning Doge Francesco Donato around 1550.

Shortly after the British occupation, a municipal council was established in Nicosia in 1882 to oversee the general administration of public affairs within the city and the surrounding area outside the walls, under the presidency of a mayor. The first municipal offices were located in Municipality Square (now the Central Municipal Market). In 1944, the offices were temporarily transferred to the d'Avila Bastion, and in 1952 the move was made permanent following a decision to renovate the building.

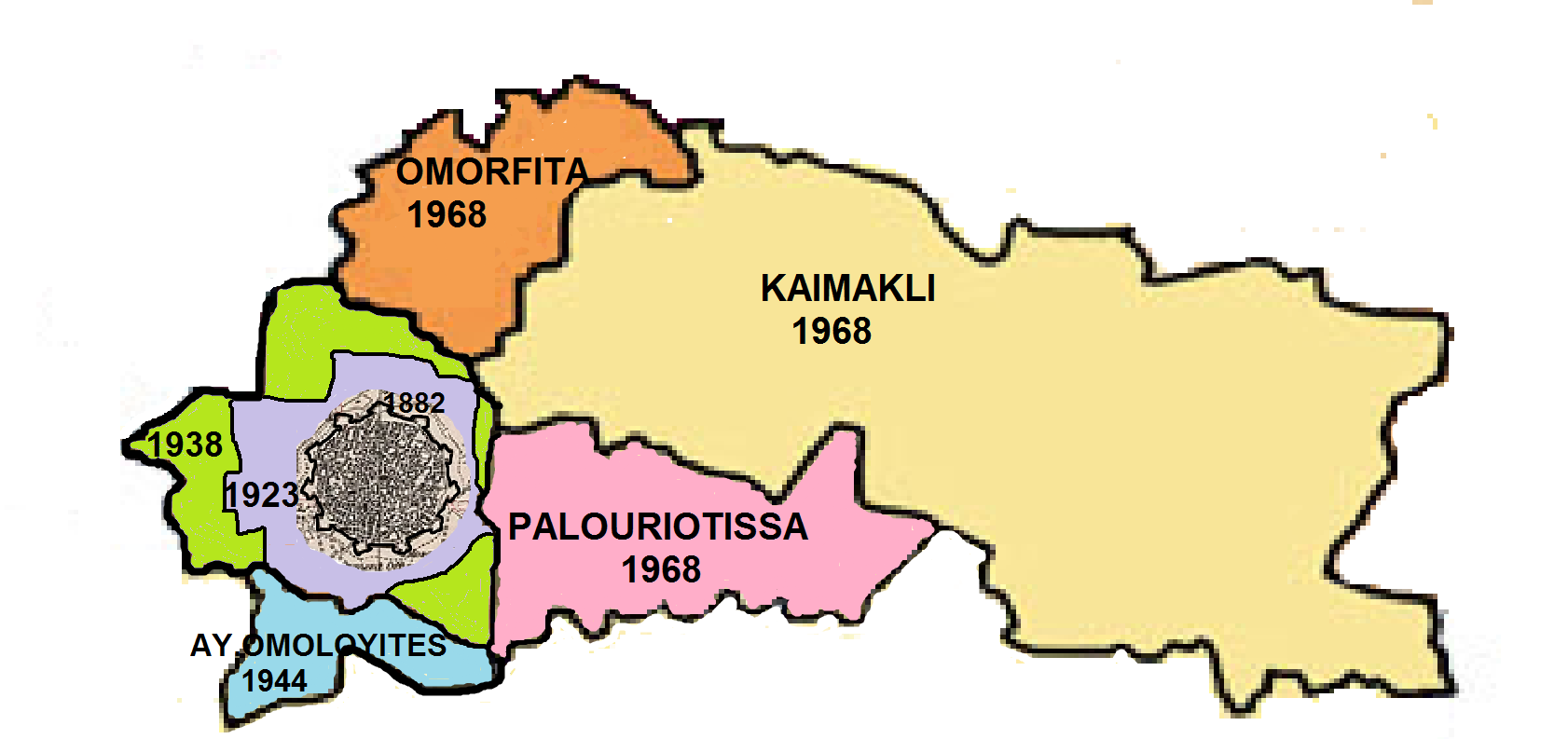
Extensions to the Nicosia municipal area

In 1923 the municipal boundaries were extended further, and the newly incorporated area was divided among several existing intramural neighbourhoods. In 1938, the boundary was extended westward to its present limits, incorporating Ayii Omoloyites in the southwest, and northward and northeastward to the boundaries of Palouriotissa, Kaimakli and Omorfita. In 1944, the village authority of Ayii Omoloyites was absorbed. Palouriotissa, Kaimakli and Omorfita were annexed to the city in 1968.

Nicosia International Airport was opened in 1947. It served as the city's air station until its abandonment in 1974.

In 1955, an armed struggle against British rule began with the aim of uniting the island with Greece (enosis). The struggle was led by EOKA, a Greek Cypriot nationalist resistance organisation, and was supported by the vast majority of Greek Cypriots. However, the unification with Greece was not achieved and instead Cyprus gained independence in 1960. During this period, Nicosia became the scene of violent protests against British rule.

=== Independence and division ===
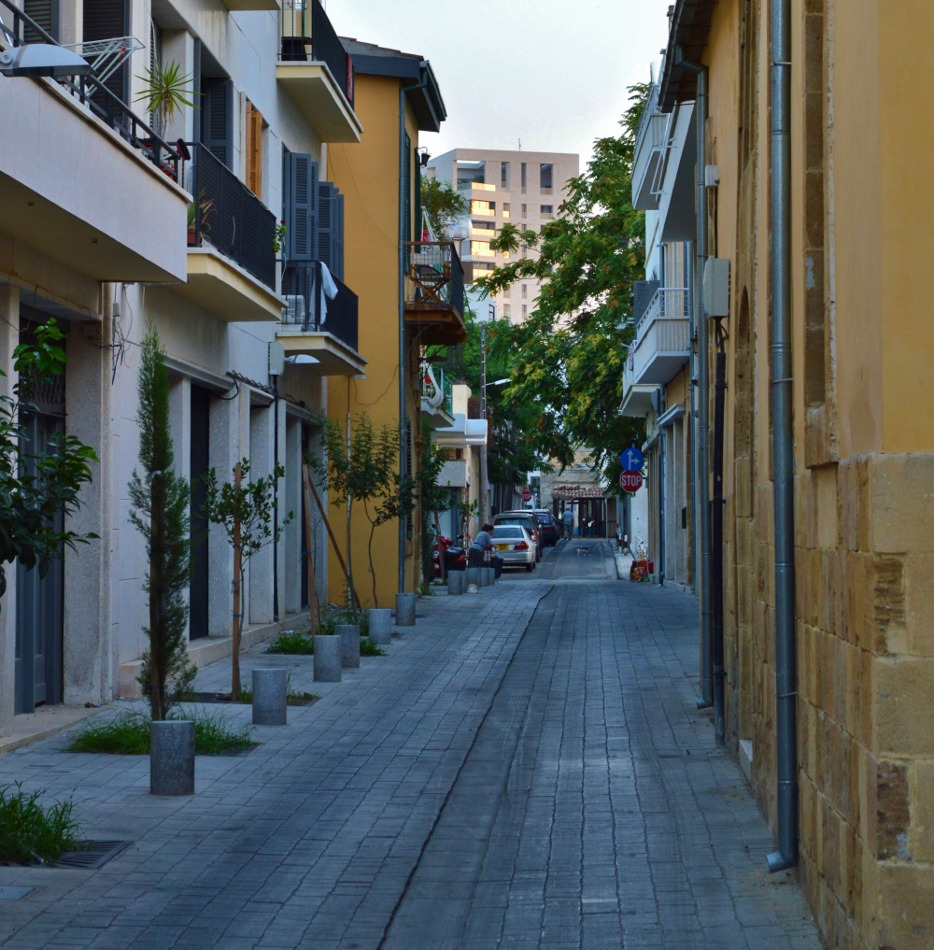
Scheme for new pedestrianised streets in old Nicosia implemented after 2004

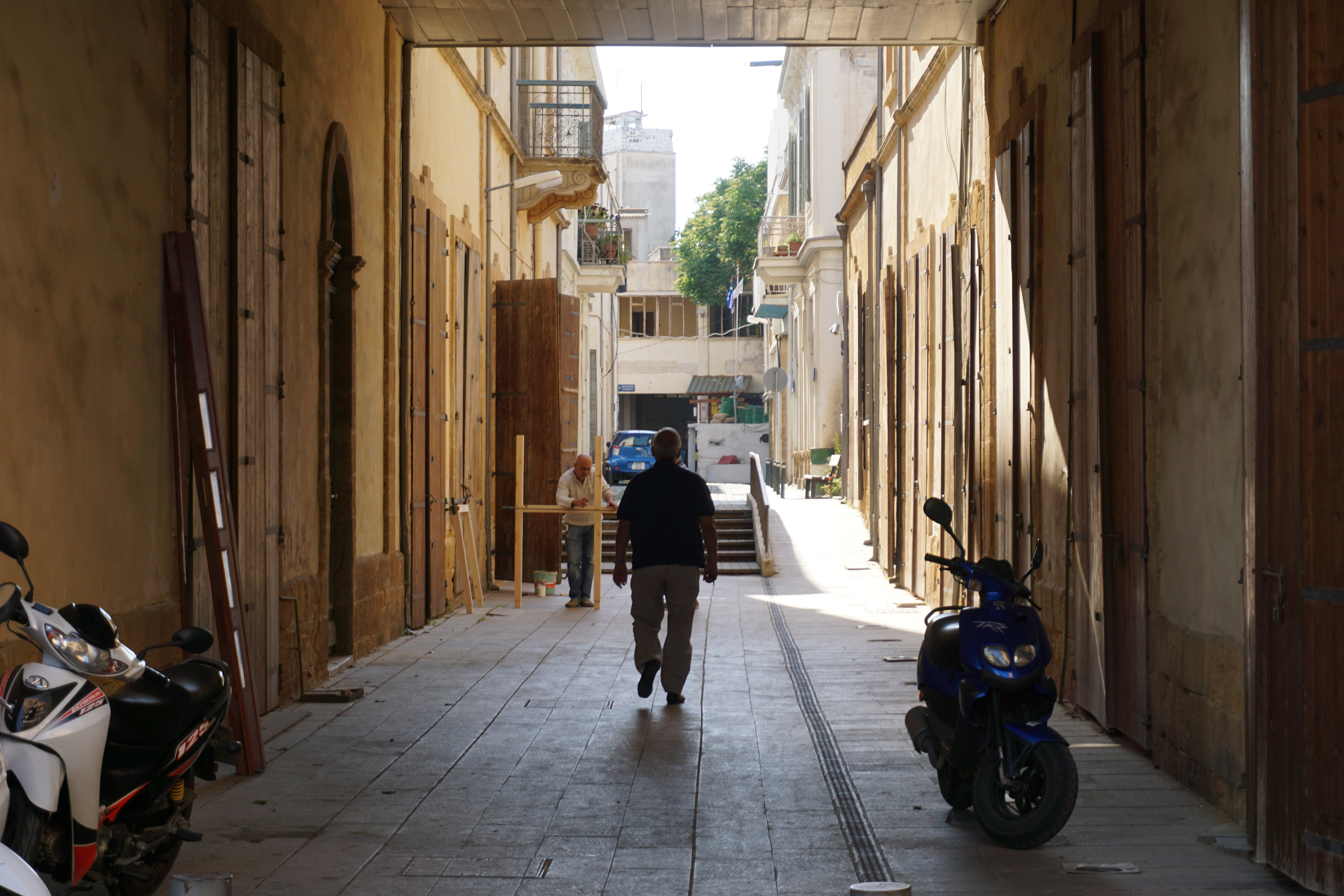
Street in Nicosia close to the buffer zone

In 1960, Nicosia became the capital of the Republic of Cyprus, a state established jointly by Greek Cypriots and Turkish Cypriots. In 1963, the Greek Cypriot leadership proposed amendments to the constitution, but these were rejected by the Turkish Cypriot community. In the aftermath of the resulting crisis, intercommunal violence broke out between Greek and Turkish Cypriots on 21 December 1963. Nicosia was subsequently divided into Greek and Turkish Cypriot quarters by the Green Line named after the colour of the pen used by a United Nations officer when drawing the line on a map of the city. This resulted in Turkish Cypriots withdrawing from the government, and following further intercommunal violence in 1964, a number of Turkish Cypriots moved to the Turkish quarter of Nicosia, leading to severe overcrowding.

On 15 July 1974, there was a coup d'état led by the Greek military junta to unite the island with Greece. The coup ousted president Makarios III and replaced him with pro-enosis nationalist Nikos Sampson.

The coup d'état precipitated the invasion of the island by the Turkish army on 20 July 1974. The operation consisted of two phases. The second phase of the invasion began on 14 August 1974, where Turkish forces advanced their positions, eventually capturing 37% of Cypriot territory including the northern part of Nicosia. The fighting left the island with a major refugee crisis on both sides.

On 13 February 1975, the Turkish Cypriot community declared the Turkish Federated State of Cyprus in the area occupied by Turkish forces. On 15 November 1983, Turkish Cypriots proclaimed their independence as the Turkish Republic of Northern Cyprus, recognised only by Turkey and seen by the international community as a part of the Republic of Cyprus but not under its effective control.

On 23 April 2003, the Ledra Palace crossing through the Green Line was opened, marking the first time since 1974 that crossing between the two sides was permitted. This was followed by the opening of Ayios Dometios/Metehan crossing point on 9 May 2003. On 3 April 2008, the Ledra Street crossing was also reopened.

On 30 October 2016, Nicosia became the only capital city in the world with two time zones, after the parliament of the de facto Turkish Republic of Northern Cyprus abolished standard time and decided that Northern Cyprus remains at UTC+03:00 year-round, following Turkey's example. The following year, due to criticism from the Turkish Cypriot public in the north, the Turkish Cypriot government decided to go back to standard time, following the rest of Europe.

== Climate ==
Located in the rain shadow of the Troodos Mountains, Nicosia has a hot semi-arid climate (Köppen climate classification BSh) characterised by low annual precipitation totals and average annual temperature. The city experiences long, hot to sweltering dry summers, and mild winters, with most of the rainfall occurring during winter. Winter precipitation is occasionally accompanied by sleet and, more rarely, snow. Snow accumulation is particularly rare; with last recorded events in 1950, 1974, 1997, 2015, and 2022. Light frost occasionally during winter nights. On 4 September 2020, Nicosia recorded a temperature of 46.2 °C (115.2 °F), the highest ever recorded in Cyprus. On 25 February 2025, Nicosia recorded −3.7 °C (25.3 °F), the lowest temperature in the city since 1983 when records began at the Athalassa meteorological station.

Climate data for Athalassa, Nicosia, elevation: 162 m (1991–2020) (Satellite view)
Month	Jan	Feb	Mar	Apr	May	Jun	Jul	Aug	Sep	Oct	Nov	Dec	Year
Record high °C (°F)	24.0 (75.2)	27.8 (82.0)	33.4 (92.1)	39.0 (102.2)	43.9 (111.0)	44.6 (112.3)	44.6 (112.3)	45.6 (114.1)	46.2 (115.2)	40.4 (104.7)	32.6 (90.7)	28.4 (83.1)	46.2 (115.2)
Mean maximum °C (°F)	19.5 (67.1)	21.0 (69.8)	25.4 (77.7)	31.8 (89.2)	36.6 (97.9)	40.2 (104.4)	41.5 (106.7)	41.8 (107.2)	38.9 (102.0)	33.6 (92.5)	26.5 (79.7)	21.2 (70.2)	42.4 (108.3)
Mean daily maximum °C (°F)	15.8 (60.4)	16.6 (61.9)	20.0 (68.0)	24.7 (76.5)	29.8 (85.6)	34.4 (93.9)	37.5 (99.5)	37.4 (99.3)	34.0 (93.2)	29.2 (84.6)	22.7 (72.9)	17.7 (63.9)	26.7 (80.1)
Daily mean °C (°F)	10.7 (51.3)	11.2 (52.2)	13.8 (56.8)	17.7 (63.9)	22.6 (72.7)	27.1 (80.8)	30.0 (86.0)	30.0 (86.0)	26.7 (80.1)	22.5 (72.5)	16.8 (62.2)	12.5 (54.5)	20.1 (68.2)
Mean daily minimum °C (°F)	5.7 (42.3)	5.8 (42.4)	7.6 (45.7)	10.8 (51.4)	15.3 (59.5)	19.8 (67.6)	22.6 (72.7)	22.5 (72.5)	19.4 (66.9)	15.9 (60.6)	10.8 (51.4)	7.3 (45.1)	13.6 (56.5)
Mean minimum °C (°F)	0.6 (33.1)	0.9 (33.6)	2.1 (35.8)	5.4 (41.7)	9.8 (49.6)	14.1 (57.4)	17.6 (63.7)	17.8 (64.0)	14.2 (57.6)	10.5 (50.9)	5.9 (42.6)	2.2 (36.0)	−0.8 (30.6)
Record low °C (°F)	−2.3 (27.9)	−3.7 (25.3)	0.0 (32.0)	1.6 (34.9)	7.5 (45.5)	10.6 (51.1)	10.5 (50.9)	16.3 (61.3)	13.0 (55.4)	5.4 (41.7)	0.3 (32.5)	−1.5 (29.3)	−3.7 (25.3)
Average precipitation mm (inches)	54.7 (2.15)	42.0 (1.65)	33.2 (1.31)	23.5 (0.93)	20.3 (0.80)	12.1 (0.48)	3.4 (0.13)	1.9 (0.07)	6.1 (0.24)	21.6 (0.85)	41.5 (1.63)	83.8 (3.30)	344.1 (13.55)
Average precipitation days (≥ 1.0 mm)	7.7	6.2	5.2	3.6	2.4	1.3	0.3	0.2	0.8	2.3	5.0	8.3	43.3
Average relative humidity (%)	76	74	68	62	58	53	53	58	59	62	69	77	64
Mean monthly sunshine hours	180.0	190.5	240.5	271.8	327.7	368.3	385.9	364.4	306.8	269.2	216.2	176.9	3,298.4
Percentage possible sunshine	60	64	67	72	77	87	90	89	84	76	67	58	74
Average ultraviolet index	2	3	5	7	9	10	11	10	8	5	3	2	6
Source 1: World Meteorological Organization Normals (NOAA)
Source 2: Weather Atlas (uv index)

== Cityscape ==
As of 2023 a report ranked Nicosia as having the lowest proportion of green spaces among European capital cities, with only three per cent of the city covered by trees.

=== South of the Green Line ===
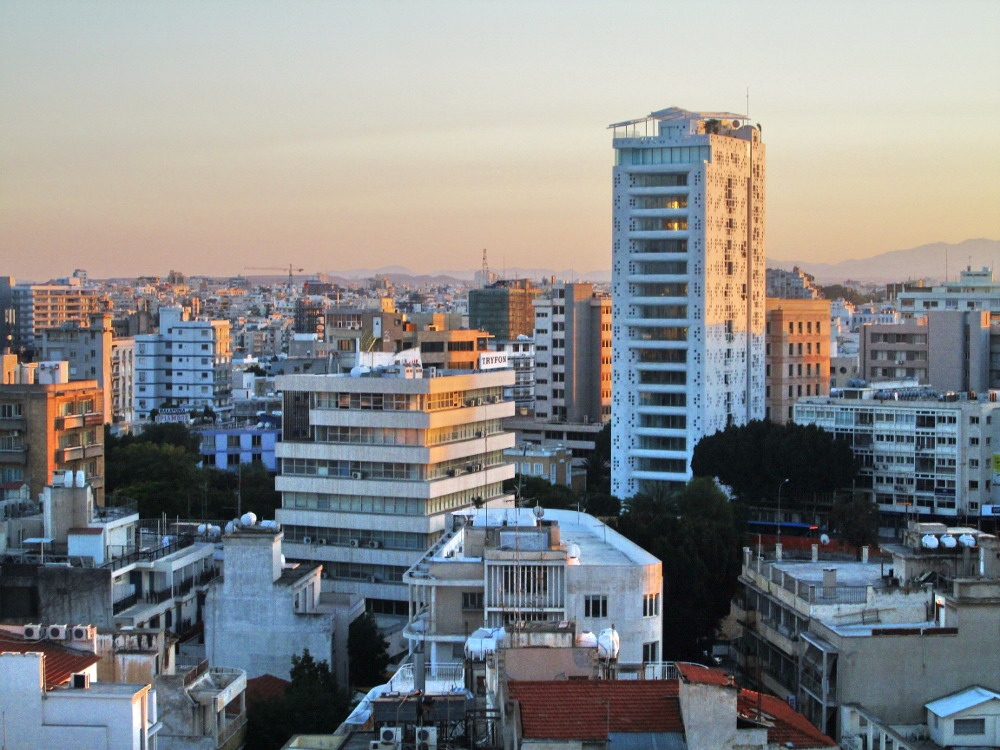
View of Nicosia from Shacolas Tower

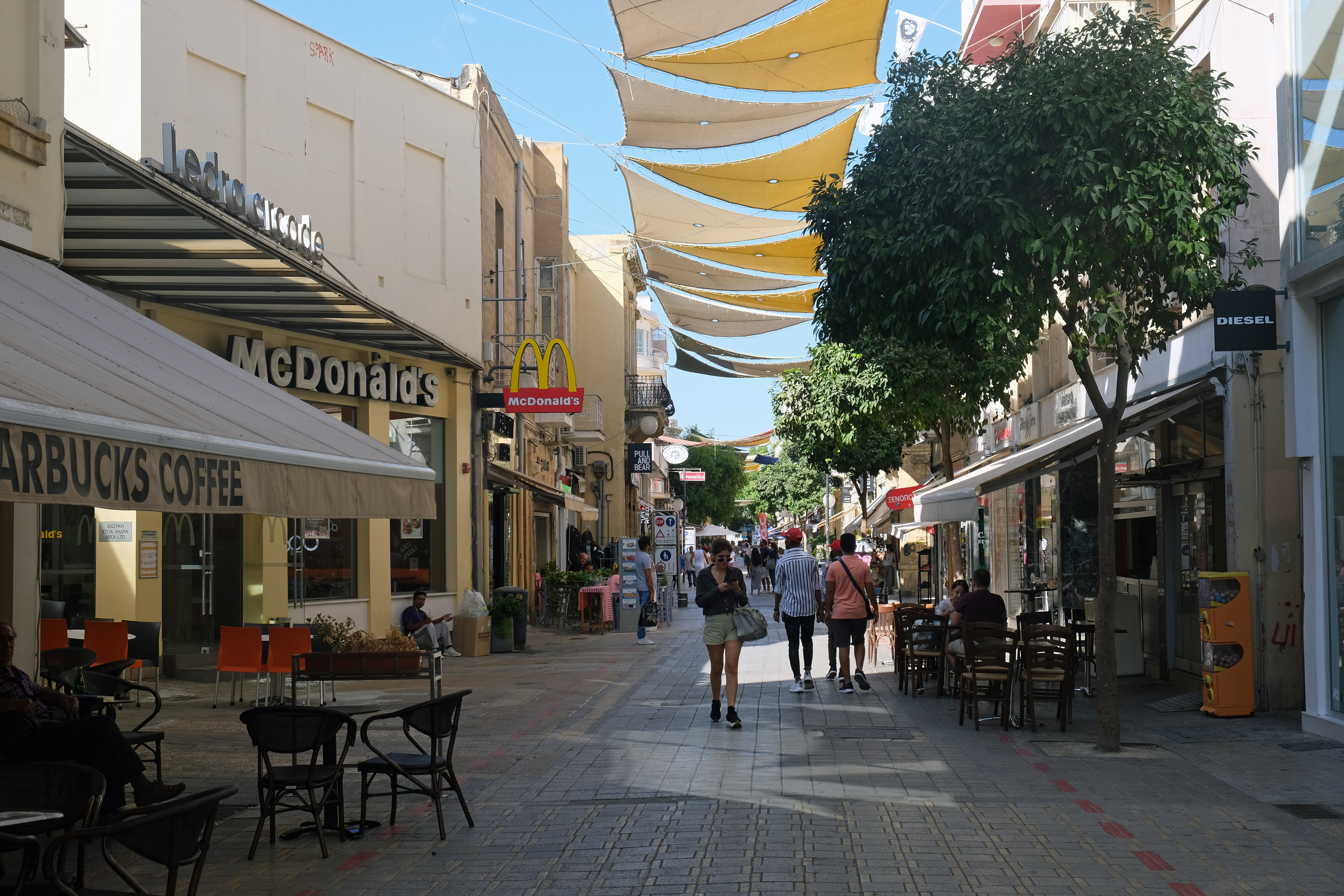
Ledra Street

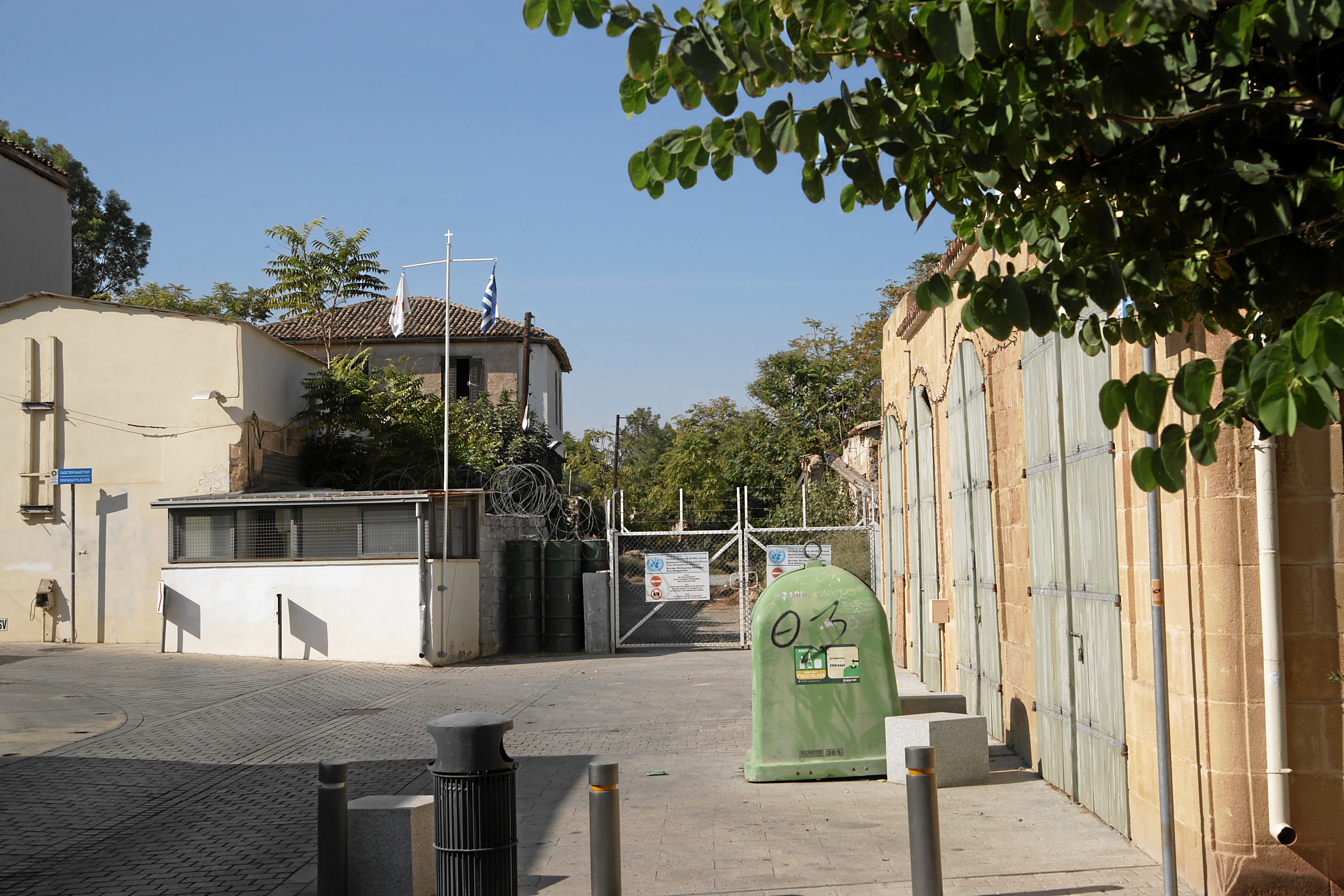
Buffer zone in Nicosia

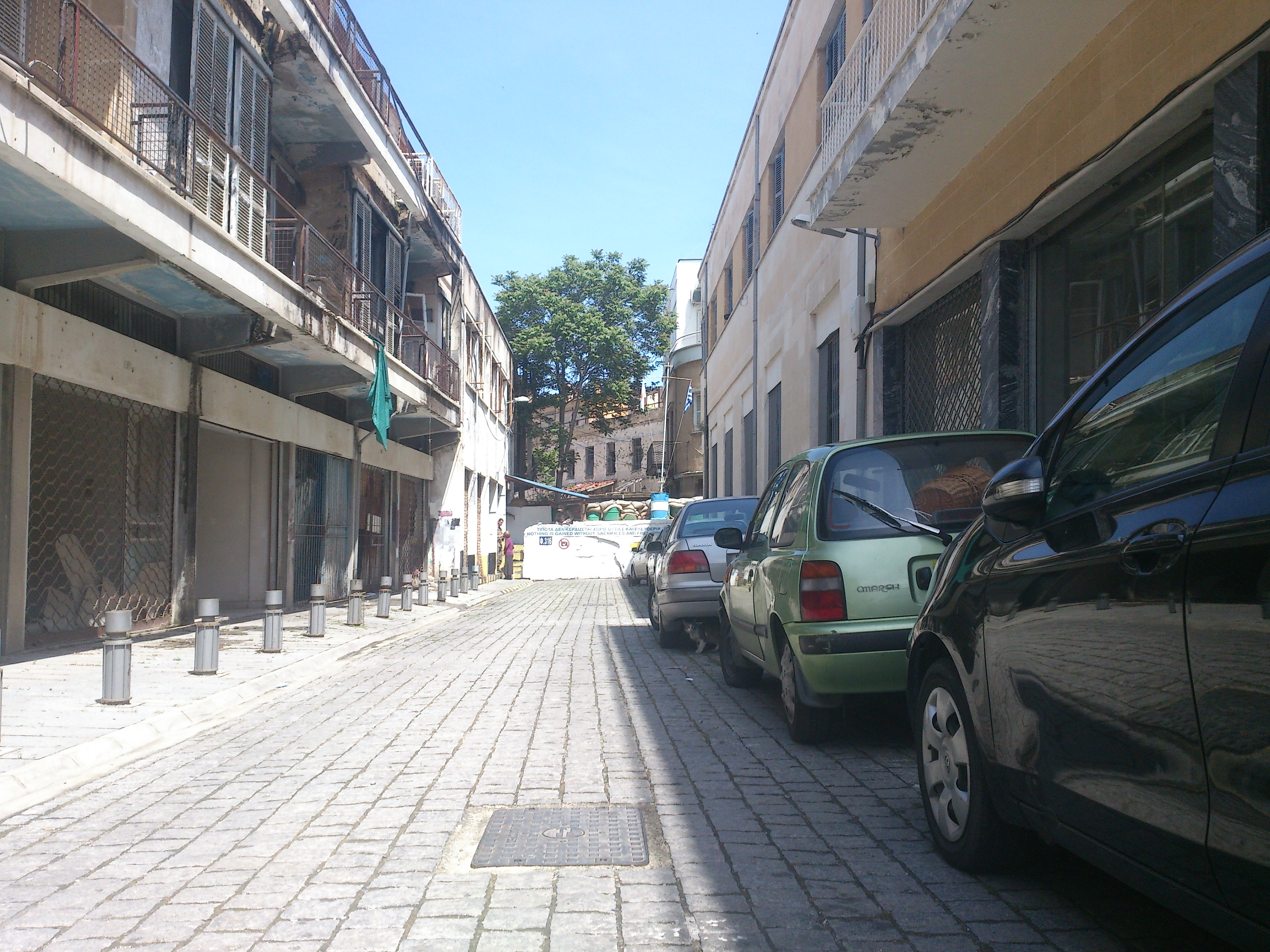
Street close to the Nicosia border

Ledra Street is located in the centre of the walled city. The street has historically been the busiest shopping street in the capital. Adjacent streets lead to the most lively part of the old city characterised by narrow streets, boutiques, bars and art cafés. Today, the street is a historic landmark in its own right. It is approximately 1 km (0.6 mi) in length and connects the northern and southern parts of the old city. During the EOKA campaign (1955 to 1959), the street acquired the informal nickname The Murder Mile in reference to the frequent targeting of the British colonialists by nationalist fighters along its course. In 1963, during the outbreak of hostilities between the Greek Cypriot and Turkish Cypriot communities, following the announcement of proposed amendments to the Cypriot Constitution, Turkish Cypriots withdrew to the northern part of Nicosia, which became one of the numerous Turkish Cypriot enclaves across the island. Several streets connecting the northern and southern parts of the city, including Ledra Street, were barricaded. During the Turkish invasion of Cyprus in 1974, Turkish troops occupied northern Nicosia (as well as the northern part of Cyprus). A buffer zone was established across the island along the ceasefire line to separate the northern Turkish controlled part of the island, and the south. The buffer zone runs through Ledra Street. After many unsuccessful attempts to reach an agreement between the two communities, Ledra Street was reopened on 3 April 2008.

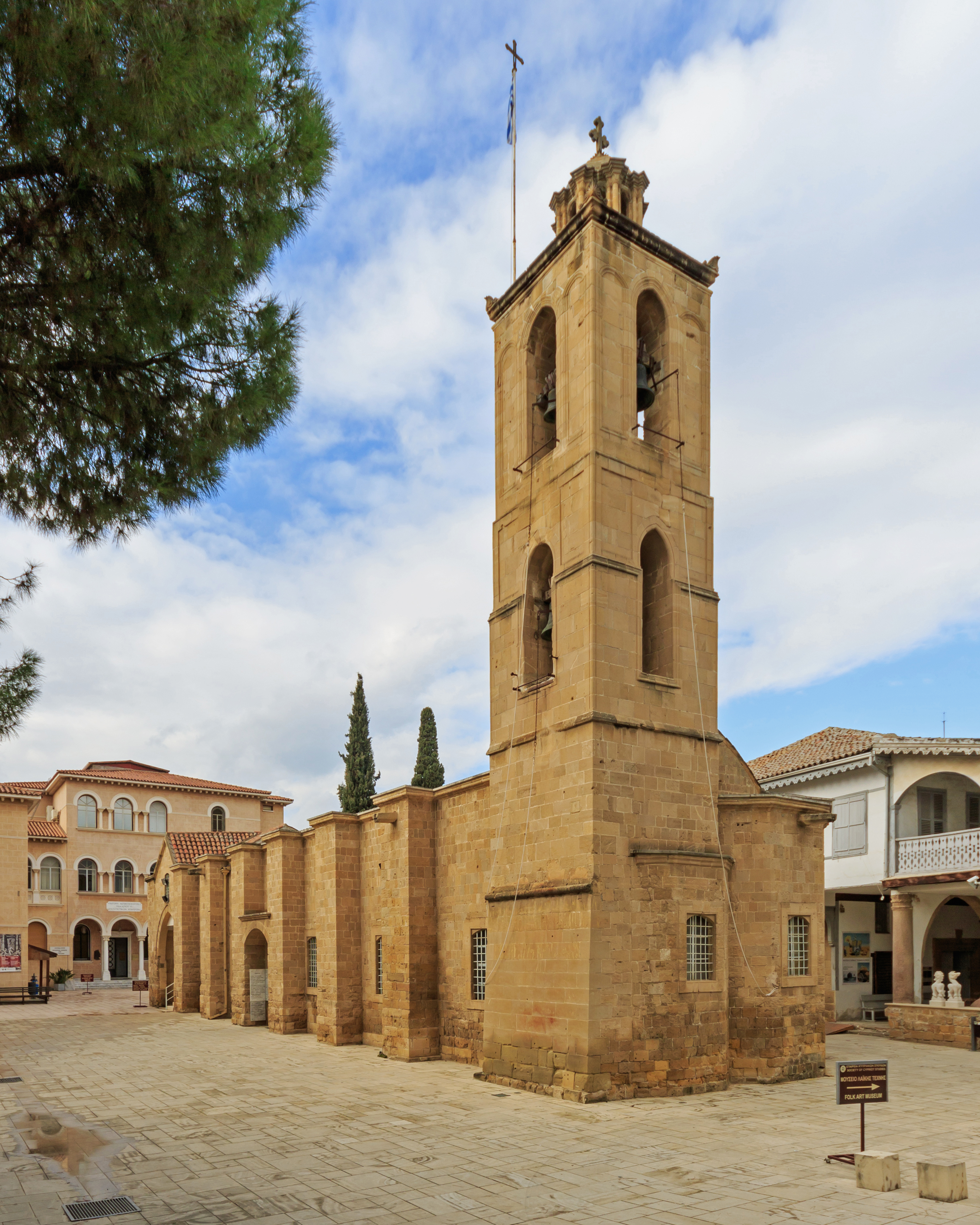
St. John's Cathedral

To the east of Ledra Street, Faneromeni Square was the centre of Nicosia before 1974. It is home to several historical buildings and monuments including Faneromeni Church, Faneromeni School, Faneromeni Library and the Mausoleum of Cypriot National Martyrs. Faneromeni Church is a church built in 1872 on the site of another church located at the same site, constructed with the stone from La Cava Castle and a former convent. In the church courtyard stands the Mausoleum of Cypriot National Martyrs which contains the remains of Archbishop Kyprianos and the other bishops who were executed by the Ottomans, in Saray Square, during the 1821 revolt. Faneromeni Square leads to Onasagorou Street, another busy shopping street in the historic centre.

The Archbishop's Palace is located on Archbishop Kyprianos Square. Although it appears older, the present building was constructed in 1956 in the Venetian Revival style. Adjacent to the palace is the late Gothic St. John's Cathedral (1665) which is renowned for its frescoes.

The walls surrounding the old city have three gates: The Kyrenia Gate which provided access to the north, and particularly to Kyrenia; the Famagusta Gate which served the routes to and from Famagusta, Larnaca, Limassol and Karpasia; and the Paphos Gate which provided access to the west, particularly to Paphos. All three gates are well-preserved, with the Famagusta Gate serving as a venue for art exhibitions and concerts. The historic centre lies within the walls, but the modern city has grown beyond them.

Presently, the main square of the city is Eleftheria Square, with the old city hall, the post office and the library. The square, which has been redesigned by Zaha Hadid Architects and was delivered to the public in 2021, connects the old city with the new city where one can find the main shopping streets such as Stasikratous Street, Themistokli Dervi Avenue and Makariou Avenue.

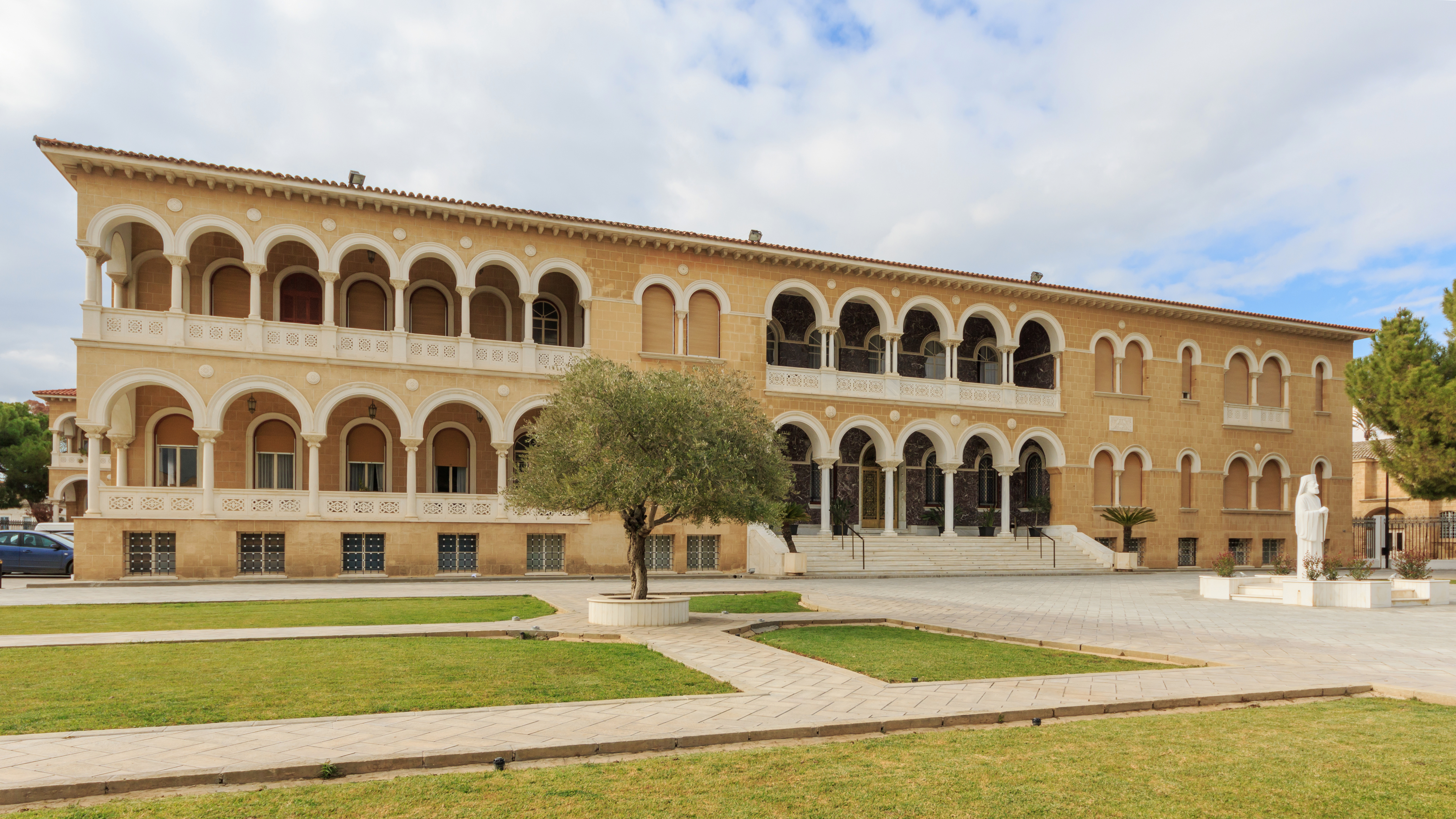
Archbishop's Palace

The Archbishop's Palace contains a Byzantine museum containing the largest collection of religious icons on the island. Leventis Municipal Museum is the only historical museum of Nicosia. Other museums include the Cyprus Ethnological Museum.

Nicosia also hosts an Armenian archbishopric, a small Buddhist temple, a Maronite archbishopric, and a Roman Catholic church.

=== North of the Green Line ===
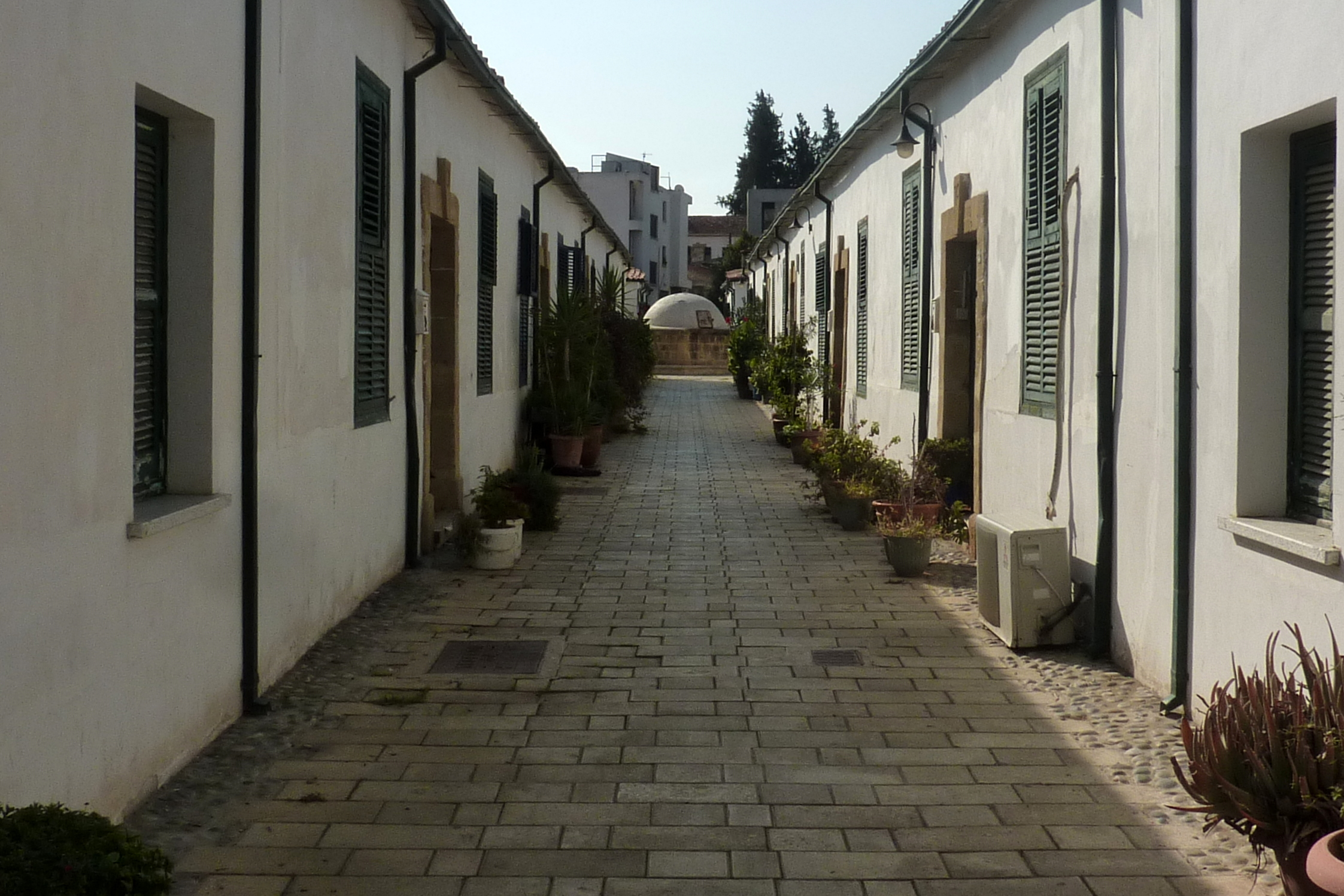
The historical Samanbahçe neighbourhood

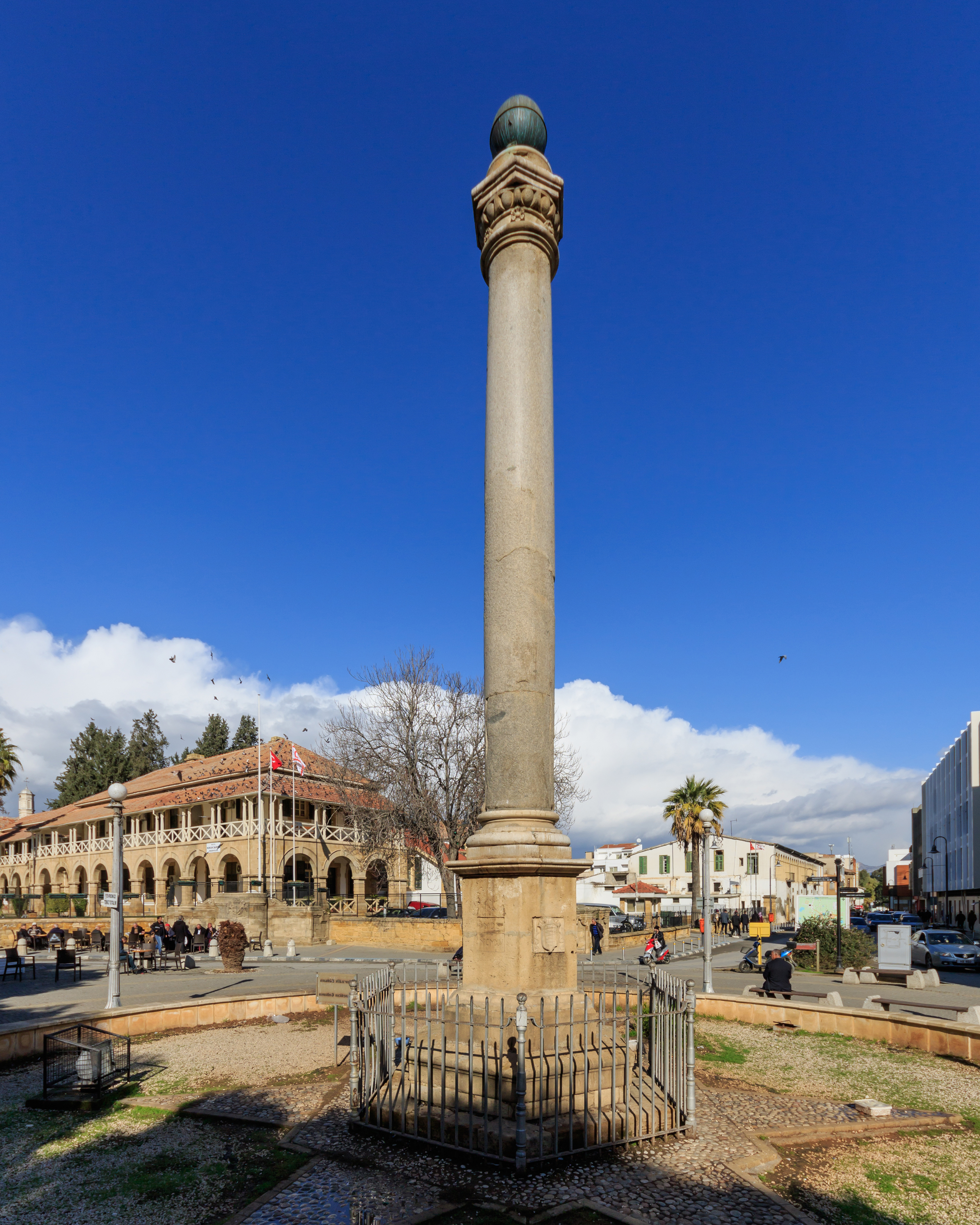
Sarayönü Square

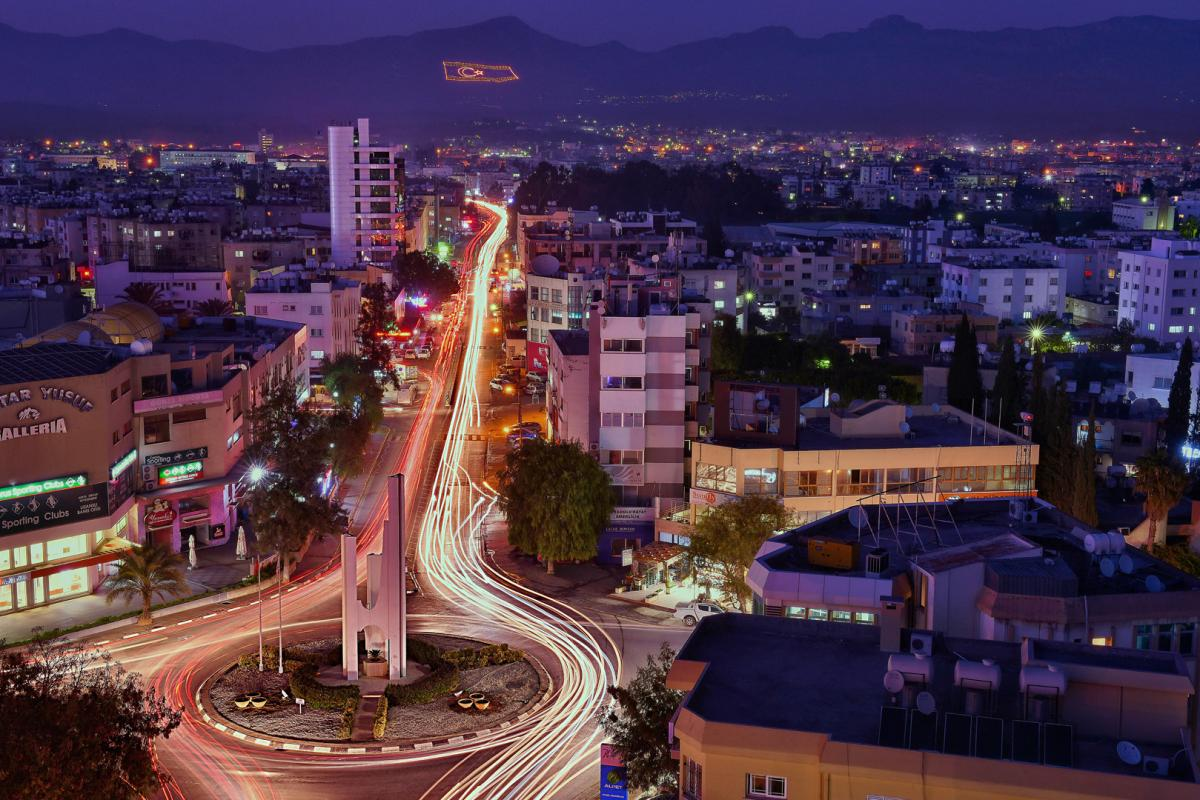
A view from the Yenişehir quarter

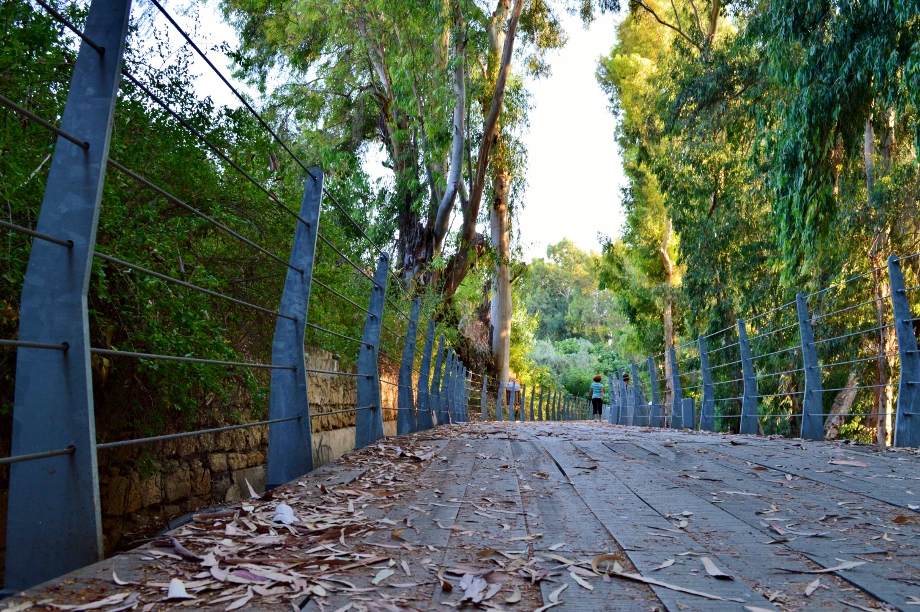
Pedieos river walking route

At the centre of the walled city lies Sarayönü Square. The square has been described as "the heart of Nicosia" and has historically served as the cultural centre of the Turkish Cypriot community. At the centre of the square stands the Venetian Column, known locally as "the Obelisk" ("Dikiltaş") and symbolic of the country's government. The column was brought from the ancient city of Salamis by the Venetians in 1550. Girne Avenue connects Sarayönü to the Kyrenia Gate and the İnönü Square in front of it. The avenue has been described as "the symbol of the walled city", and is filled with numerous shops and restaurants.

Next to the Ledra Street checkpoint is the Arasta area. The area was pedestrianised in 2013 and is home to a network of historic shopping streets, reflecting an eastern shopping tradition with food and traditional items. Nearby Büyük Han, the largest caravanserai on the island, was built in 1572 by the Ottomans and functions as a cultural centre. To the west of Girne Avenue lies the Samanbahçe neighbourhood, built by the government in the 19th century and considered to be the island's first example of social housing. The neighbourhood remains a residential area today. Another central point in the walled city is the Selimiye Mosque. The mosque is the chief religious centre in Northern Cyprus. It was originally the Cathedral of Saint Sophia, a Latin cathedral whose construction began during the early years of Frankish rule, possibly in 1209, and continued for around 150 years. The Cathedral was built in the Gothic style reflecting medieval French architectural influences and was converted into a mosque following the Ottoman conquest of Nicosia in 1570, when two minarets were added to the building. Next to the mosque is the Bedesten, a covered market place. Once an Orthodox cathedral incorporating Byzantine and Gothic styles, it ceased to function as a place of worship during the Ottoman era. Today, it is used as a cultural centre hosting activities such as concerts and festivals.

The quarters of Nicosia outside the walled city are more spacious than the walled city, with wider roads and junctions. These areas are characterised by multi-floor concrete buildings. In the outskirts of the city, a number of large and imposing villas have been built that belong to the middle and upper-classes. Dereboyu Avenue serves as the modern heart of the northern part and is its centre of entertainment.

== Politics and administration ==
=== Governance of the metropolitan area ===
Greater Nicosia

Greater Nicosia is administered by several municipalities. Following local government reform on the 01 July 2024, the former municipalities of Aglandjia, Engomi, Ayios Dhometios were incorporated into the Municipality of Nicosia; Tseri became part of Lakatamia; and Geri became part of the Municipality of Latsia-Geri. Strovolos remained unchanged. The new Municipality of South Nicosia-Idalion was also established to incorporate the former Municipality of Dali and several surrounding communities.

According to the 2021 Census of Population and Housing record, 350,035 people lived in Nicosia District in the government-controlled areas of Cyprus; Strovolos was the largest single municipality in the Nicosia urban area, with 70,823 inhabitants. Following the 2024 local government reform, the newly expanded Nicosia municipality's population was 111,433.

The Nicosia municipal district includes neighbourhoods, such as Kaimakli, Pallouriotissa, Omorfita and Ayii Omoloyites.

There is no single metropolitan authority for Greater Nicosia. The 1 July 2024 reform abolished separate statutory boards, such as the Nicosia Water Board and the Nicosia Sewerage Board. Instead, the Nicosia District Local Government Organisation (NDLGO) was established to administer water supply, sewage and stormwater drainage, development licensing and solid waste management across the Nicosia district.

The NDLGO operates three major wastewater treatment plants serving the district. The Mia Milia Wastewater Treatment Plant in Haspolat, which became operational in 2013, has a treatment capacity of 30,000 cubic metres per day and serves Nicosia, Ayios Dometios, Engomi, parts of Strovolos and Aglantzia, and part of the occupied Nicosia area. The other major plants are at Anthoupolis and Vathia Gonia. The Mia Milia plant treats wastewater from both the Greek Cypriot and Turkish Cypriot communities.

Before 5 July 2020, public transport in Nicosia had been administered through the Nicosia District Administration, with bus services operated by OSEL. Following a competitive tender, Cyprus Public Transport (CPT) took over the operation of bus services in Nicosia District, under a government concession.

Taxi services are provided by licensed operators. Road-use licences are issued by the Licensing Authority and professional licences for taxi drivers are issued by the Road Transport Department.

=== Nicosia Municipality ===
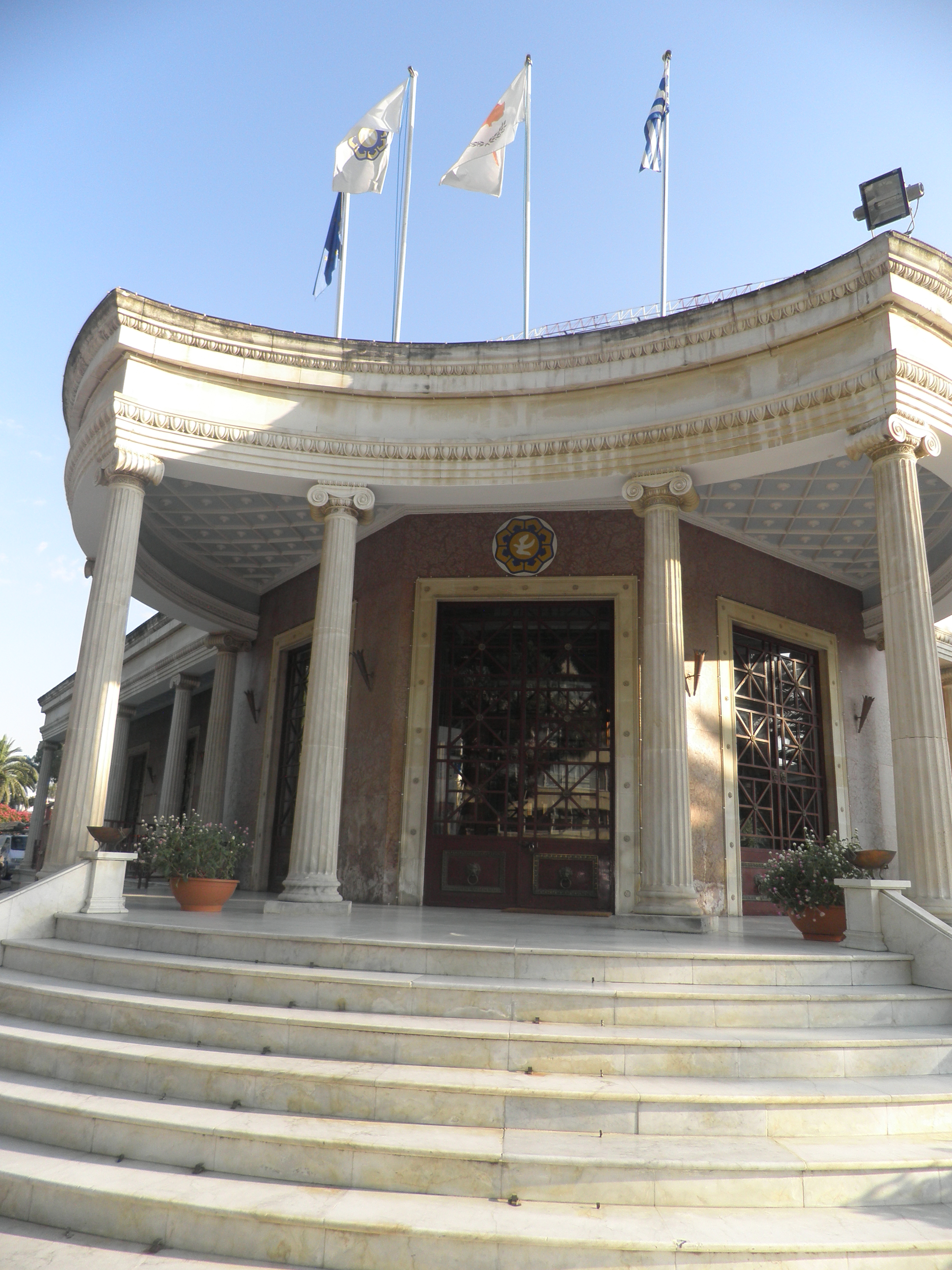
The old building of the Nicosia Municipality at Eleftheria Square

The constitution of Cyprus states that various main government buildings and headquarters must be situated within Nicosia Municipality's boundaries. Article 173 provides for separate Greek and Turkish municipalities in Nicosia and four other major towns, established in 1958. The remaining areas, in the south and east of the city, are administered by Nicosia Municipality. Nicosia Turkish Municipality, founded in 1958, carries out municipal duties in the northern and north-western part of city.

=== Nicosia Turkish Municipality ===
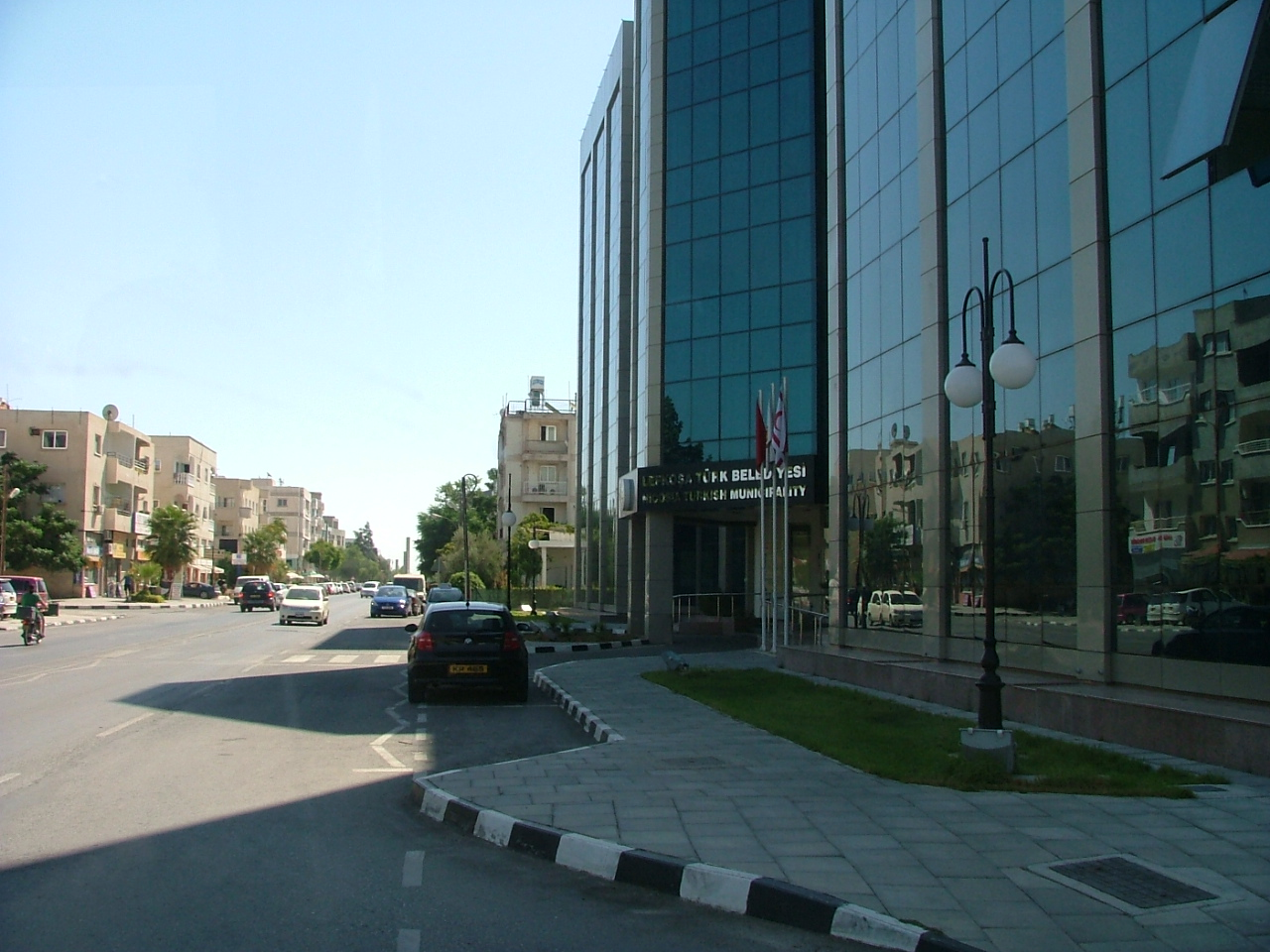
Nicosia Turkish Municipal building

In October 1959, the British Colonial Administration passed the Turkish Municipal Committees (Temporary Provisions) Law, 1959. The law made temporary provision for exercising certain municipal functions in five towns, including Nicosia. In 1960, following Cyprus's declaration of independence, article 173 of the Constitution of the Republic of Cyprus provided for separate Greek and Turkish municipalities in the five largest towns. However, implementing legislation was required to give effect to these constitutional provisions. Negotiations to establish separate municipalities broke down in 1962, after the Turkish Cypriot side reversed its position late that month. This occurred shortly before the temporary legal framework expired on the 31 December 1962. Implementing legislation was never passed Since the complete division of Nicosia following the Turkish Invasion in 1974, the Nicosia Turkish Municipality has become the de facto local authority of northern Nicosia. The Nicosia Turkish Municipality is a member of the Union of Cyprus Turkish Municipalities. The mayor is Mehmet Harmancı of the Communal Democracy Party.

=== Other municipalities in Greater Nicosia ===
In 1986, six suburban municipalities in the Nicosia area - Strovolos, Engomi, Ayios Dhometios, Aglandjia, Latsia and Lakatamia - were established under the Municipalities Law of 1985 (Law 111/1985) , following a referendum held on the 23 February. Municipal councils, comprised a mayor and councillors, with the number of councillors determined by the population figures. All members of the council (mayors and councillors) are elected directly by the voting public for five-year terms. Following the 1 July 2024 reforms, Engomi, Ayios Dhometios and Aglandjia were incorporated into the extended Nicosia municipality alongside other reforms.

=== Administrative divisions and demographics ===
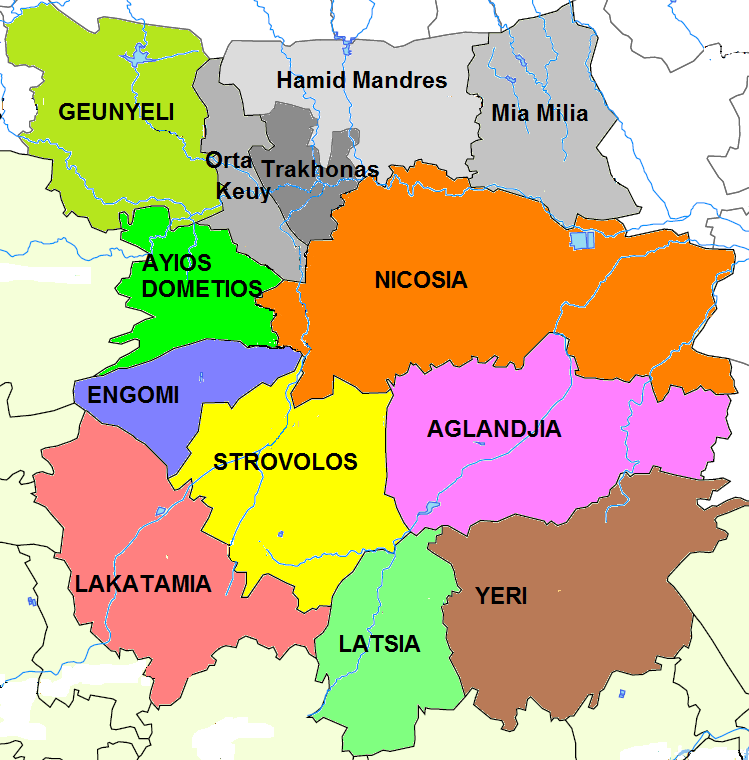
Administrative divisions (2011 Census)

Nicosia within the city limits is divided into 29 administrative units, according to the latest census. This unit is termed in English as quarter, neighbourhood, parish, enoria or mahalla. These units are: Ayios Andreas (formerly Tophane), Trypiotis, Nebethane, Tabakhane, Phaneromeni, Ayios Savvas, Omerie, Ayios Antonios (St. Anthony), St. John, Taht-el-kale, Chrysaliniotissa, Ayios Kassianos (Kafesli), Kaïmakli, Panayia, St Constantine & Helen, Agioi Omologites, Arab Ahmet, Yeni Jami, Omorfita, Ibrahim Pasha, Mahmut Pasha, Abu Kavouk, St. Luke, Abdi Chavush, Iplik Pazar and Korkut Effendi, Ayia Sophia, Haydar Pasha, Karamanzade, and Yenişehir/Neapolis.

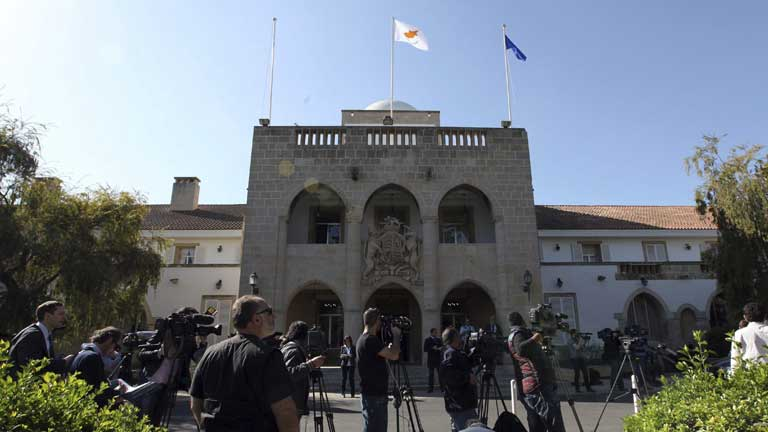
Presidential Palace in Strovolos area.

The municipality of Strovolos, established in 1986, is the second largest municipal authority in Cyprus in terms of population after Limassol and encompasses the southern suburbs of the capital immediately adjacent to Nicosia municipality. Lakatamia, Latsia, Geri and Aglandjia are other separate municipalities in the Nicosia metropolitan area.

The town of Gönyeli is now conurbated with the northern suburbs. Previously a village authority, it now functions as a municipality within the same area. The suburbs immediately to the north of the city have not organised into municipalities. The village authority of Hamitköy (also known as Hamid Mandres) is highly urbanised and was included within the borders of Nicosia Turkish Municipality as a Nicosia neighbourhood headed by a muhtar. Ortakeuy Village authority has similarly been redefined as a neighbourhood of Nicosia Turkish Municipality.

== Religion ==
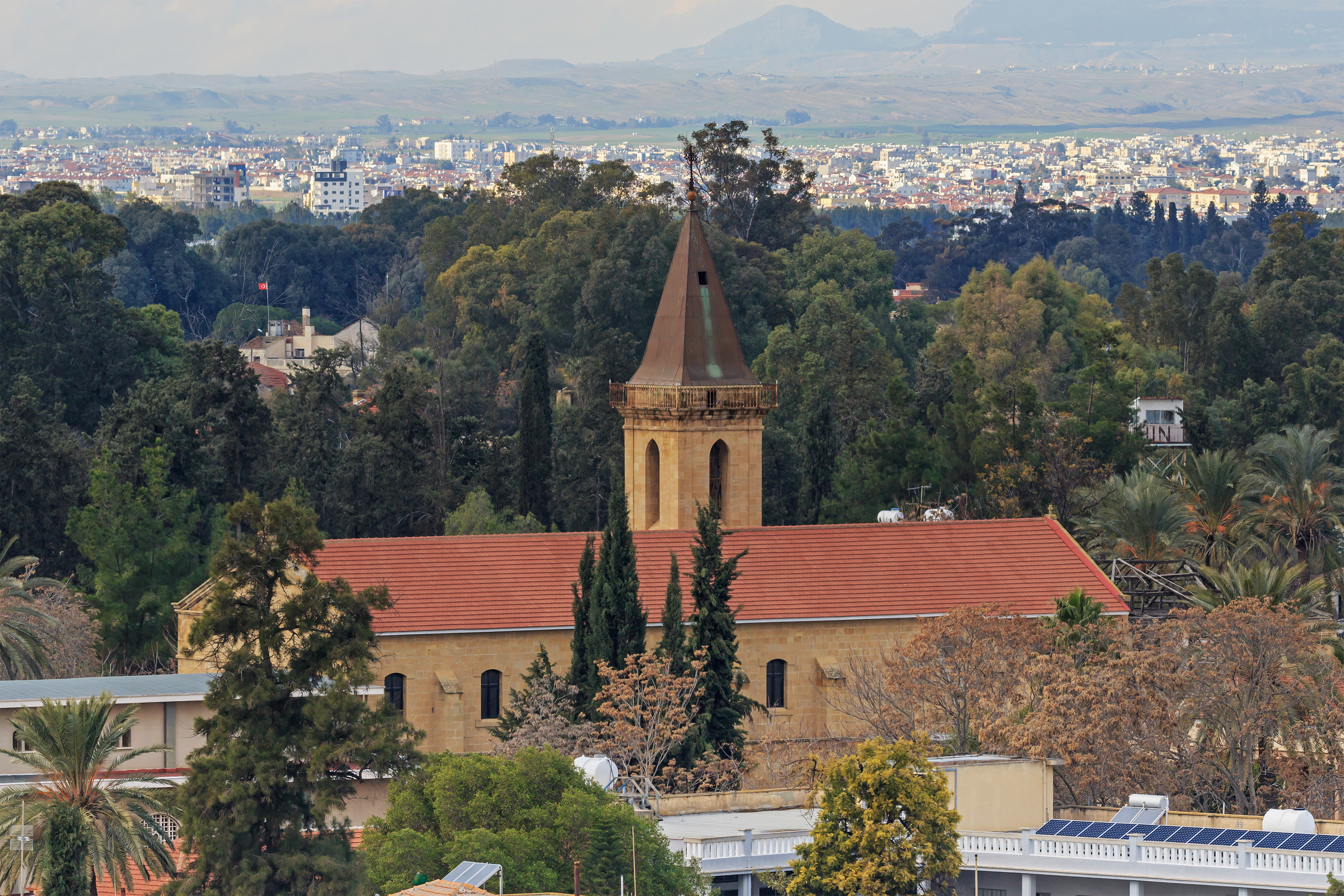
Holy Cross Church

=== Armenian Apostolic Church ===
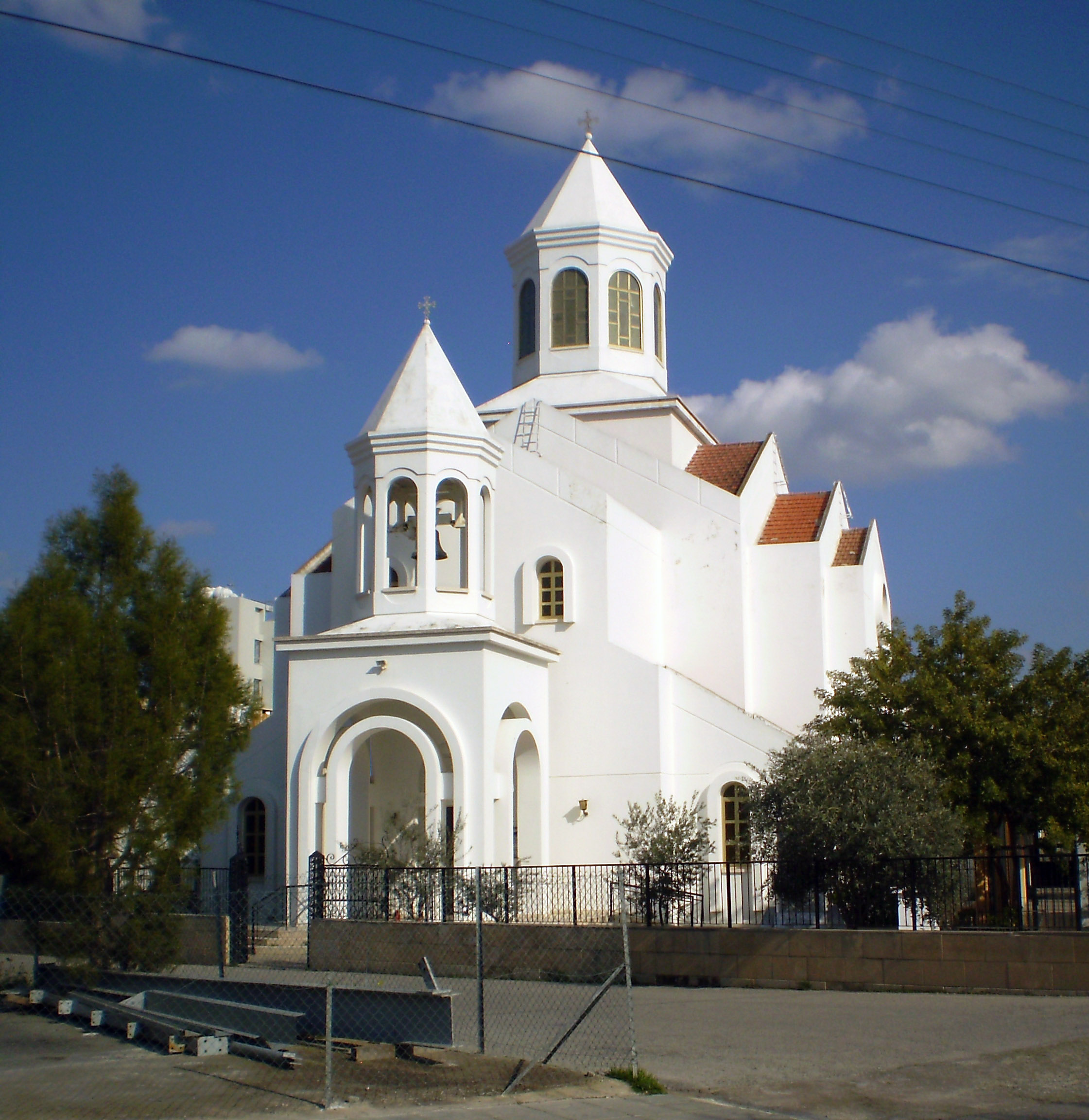
Armenian Apostolic Church in Nicosia

One of the oldest Armenian churches, known as the Benedictine Abbey of Our Lady of Tyre, was founded in the 13th century as a principal convent following the fall of Jerusalem. In 1308, the Lusignan king, Henry II of Jerusalem, repaired the church after it was destroyed by an earthquake. As many of the nuns were Armenian in origin, it came under the Armenian Church before 1504. Since 1963, the church has been located in North Nicosia, under Turkish Cypriot administration. The church suffered the collapse of some parts and greatly deteriorated until 2007, when restoration work began. The renovation was completed in 2013 and won the EU Prize For Cultural Heritage (Europa Nostra Award) in 2015. With the help of the World Council of Churches, the Church of Westphalia, the Government of Cyprus and the faithful, a new church was built in Strovolos, also called "Sourp Asdvadzadzin". Its foundation stone was laid on 25 September 1976 by Archbishop Makarios III and Archbishop Nerses Pakhdigian. It was officially inaugurated on 22 November 1981 by Catholicos of Cilicia Khoren I and Coadjutor Catholicos of Cilicia Karekin II, in the presence of Archbishop Chrysostomos I, Bishop Zareh Aznavorian and Representative Antranik L. Ashdjian.

=== Maronite Catholic Church ===
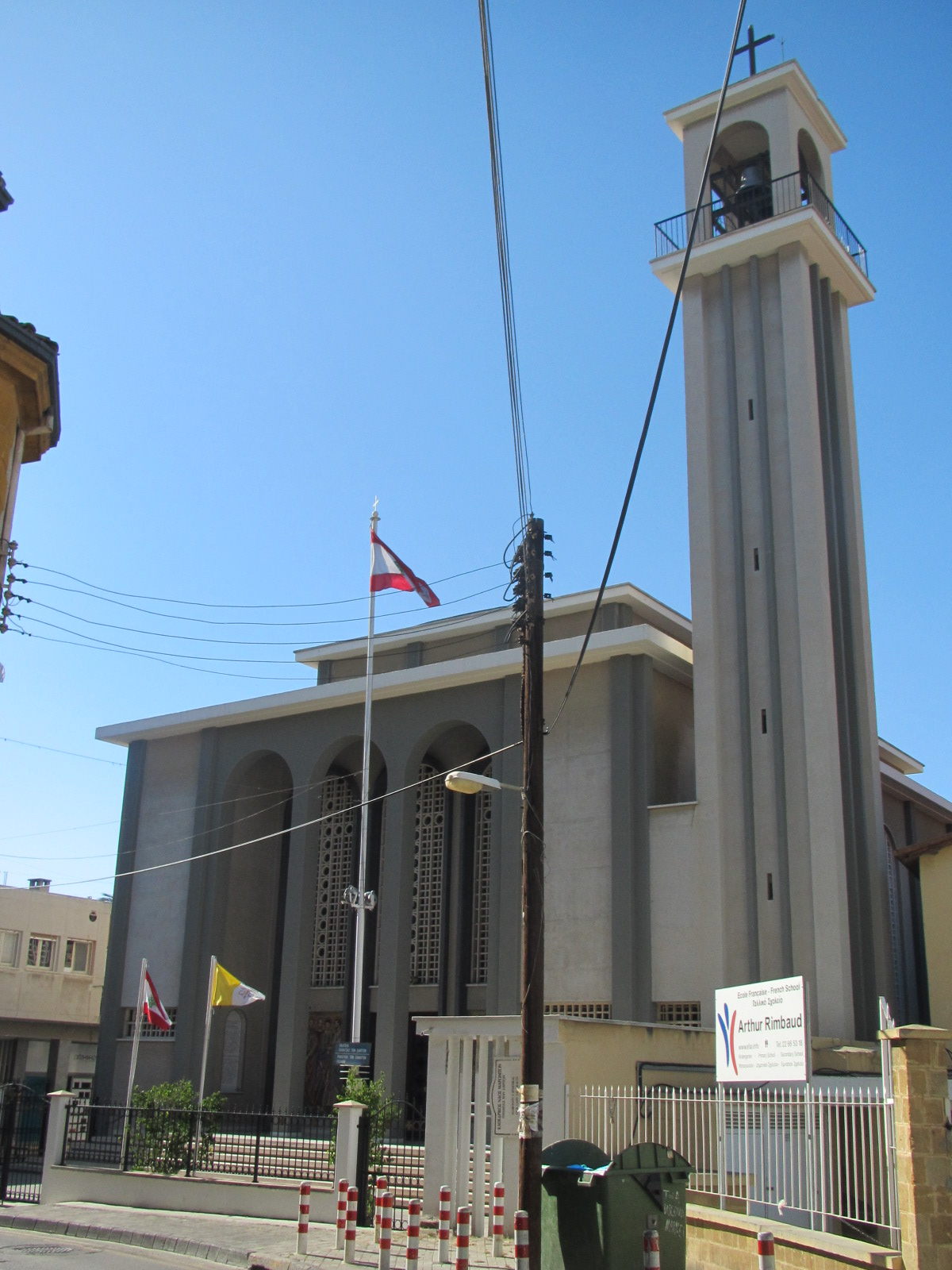
Maronite Church in Nicosia

The Maronite community is a traditional community in Nicosia. The archeparchy extends its jurisdiction over all Maronites on Cyprus. Its arcieparchial seat is the city of Nicosia, where Our Lady of Grace Cathedral is located.

At the end of 2013 out of a population of 838,897, 10,400 had been baptised, corresponding to 1.2% of the total. The church's territory is divided into 12 parishes. Our Lady of Grace Cathedral is the main Maronite church of Nicosia, and is the cathedral of the Maronite Catholic Archeparchy of Cyprus.

The first cathedral was dedicated to Satin John, but during the Ottoman period it was turned into a mosque. The Lebanese Maronite community erected the church of Santa Croce, later entrusted to the Franciscans, and the current Our Lady of Grace Cathedral is near the Franciscan church. In 1960, the seat of the vicarage and the surrounding buildings were built. On 6 June 2010 Pope Benedict XVI, the first pope to make an apostolic trip to Cyprus, visited the cathedral of Nicosia.

=== Anglican Church ===
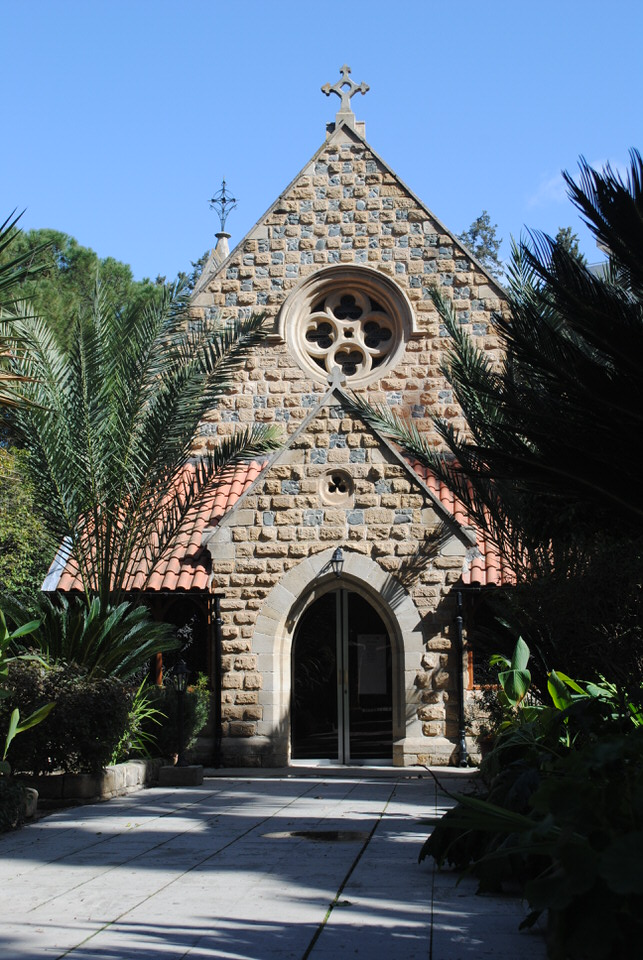
Anglican Church in Nicosia

The church of St. Paul was built in 1893 when Cyprus was a protectorate of the British Empire. The influence of politics on architecture is evident by the structural elements of the building, which is reminiscent of an English parish church. The Anglican church in Cyprus today is part of the Diocese of Cyprus and the Gulf.

=== Greek Evangelical Church ===
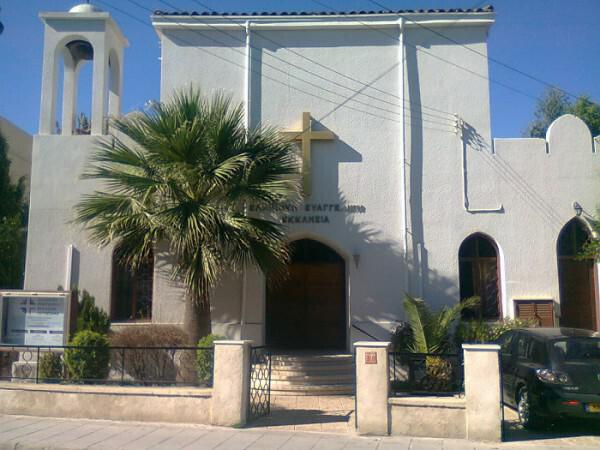
Greek Evangelical Church of Nicosia

The Greek Evangelical Church of Nicosia uses relatively modern architecture and serves the local Protestant community. Along with special hours dedicated to services of the Greek Evangelical community, it serves as a worship centre of local Protestants of other nationalities, such as Armenian, American, Romanian, Korean, Chinese. It is located on Gladstone Street.

=== Armenian Evangelical Church ===
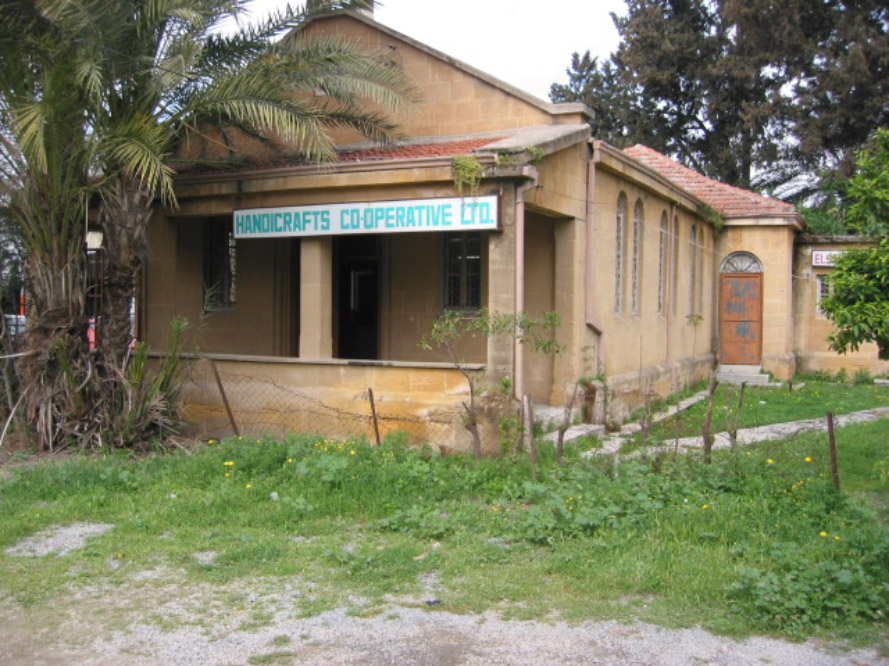
Armenian Evangelical Church of Nicosia

The first Armenian Evangelicals in Cyprus came after the arrival of the British in July 1878. As they were not committed, and very few in number, they quickly became associated with the Mother Church (Armenian Apostolic Church), such as Apisoghom Utidjian, the official state documents translator and the son of Stepan Utidjian, one of the original founders of the Armenian Evangelical Church, who served as chairman of the Nicosia parish council for 30 years. With the influx of more Protestants, Armenian Evangelicals became affiliated with the Reformed Presbyterian Church as early as 1887. Although the main centres were Nicosia and Larnaca, gatherings were occasionally held in Limassol, Famagusta, and Amiantos.

There was also a small Armenian Evangelical church, located on Mahmoud Pasha Street, in the Turkish-occupied part of the walled city of Nicosia—behind the old American Academy building, near the Arab Ahmet Mosque. Prior to its erection, Armenian Evangelicals used to worship at the Reformed Presbyterian Church on Apostolos Varnavas Street, opposite the old Powerhouse and behind the building of the Holy Archbishopric of Cyprus. The church—a vision already since the early 1930s—was eventually built thanks to the initiative of pastor Yohanna Der Megerditchian, with the financial contribution of the Reformed Presbyterian Church and the Armenian Evangelical faithful; its architect was Dickran H. Davidian. Its foundation stone was laid on 28 July 1946 by pastor Yohanna Der Megerditchian, who dedicated it on 1 July 1947. On the lower part of the right wall to the side of the entrance, there is an inscription in Armenian.

=== Converted cathedral ===
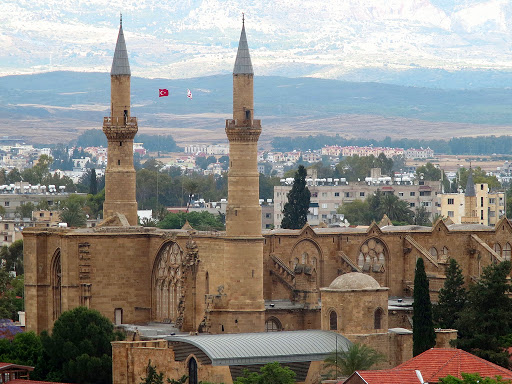
Selimiye Mosque, converted from a cathedral as the right of conquest

Perhaps the most iconic religious architecture of Nicosia is the Selimiye Mosque. Originally constructed as the Cathedral of Saint Sophia, it was also known as the Aagia Sophia of Nicosia and was constructed in 1326 as a Catholic church. It was converted into a mosque in 1570 and it is located in North Nicosia. It has historically been the main mosque of the city and is housed in the largest and oldest surviving Gothic church in Cyprus (interior dimensions: 66 m × 21 m or 217 by 69 feet) possibly constructed on the site of an earlier Byzantine church. During the 50-day Ottoman siege of the city in 1570, the cathedral provided refuge for a great number of people. When the city fell on 9 September, Francesco Contarini, the Bishop of Paphos, delivered the last Christian sermon in the building, in which he asked for divine help and exhorted the people. The cathedral was stormed by Ottoman soldiers, who broke the door and killed the bishop among others. They smashed or threw out Christian items, such as furniture and ornaments in the cathedral and destroyed the choir as well as the nave. Then, they washed the interior of the mosque to make it ready for the first Friday prayer that it would host on 15 September, which was attended by the commander Lala Mustafa Pasha and saw the official conversion of the cathedral into a mosque. During the same year, the two minarets were added, as well as Islamic features such as the mihrab (prayer niche) and the minbar (sermon pulpit).

The first imam of the mosque was Moravizade Ahmet Efendi, who hailed from the Morea province of the Ottoman Empire. All imams maintained the tradition of climbing the stairs to the minbar before Friday sermons while leaning on a sword used during the conquest of Nicosia to signify that Nicosia was captured by conquest.

Following its conversion, the mosque became the property of the Sultan Selim Foundation, later known as the Evkaf Administration of Cyprus, which was responsible for maintaining it. Other donors formed a number of foundations to help with the maintenance. Okçuzade Mehmed Paşa, a governor of Cyprus in the 16th century, donated a shop to provide income for the Sultan Selim Foundation; other donations include estates in the countryside and other shops. The foundation employed trustees (mütevelli) to look after the funds and transferred 40,000 akçe annually to Medina in late 16th century. During the Ottoman period, it was the largest mosque on the island, and was used weekly by the Ottoman governor, administrators and elite for Friday prayers. In the late 18th century, a large procession that consisted of the leading officials in the front on horseback, followed by lower-ranking officials on foot, came to the mosque every Friday.

=== Islam ===
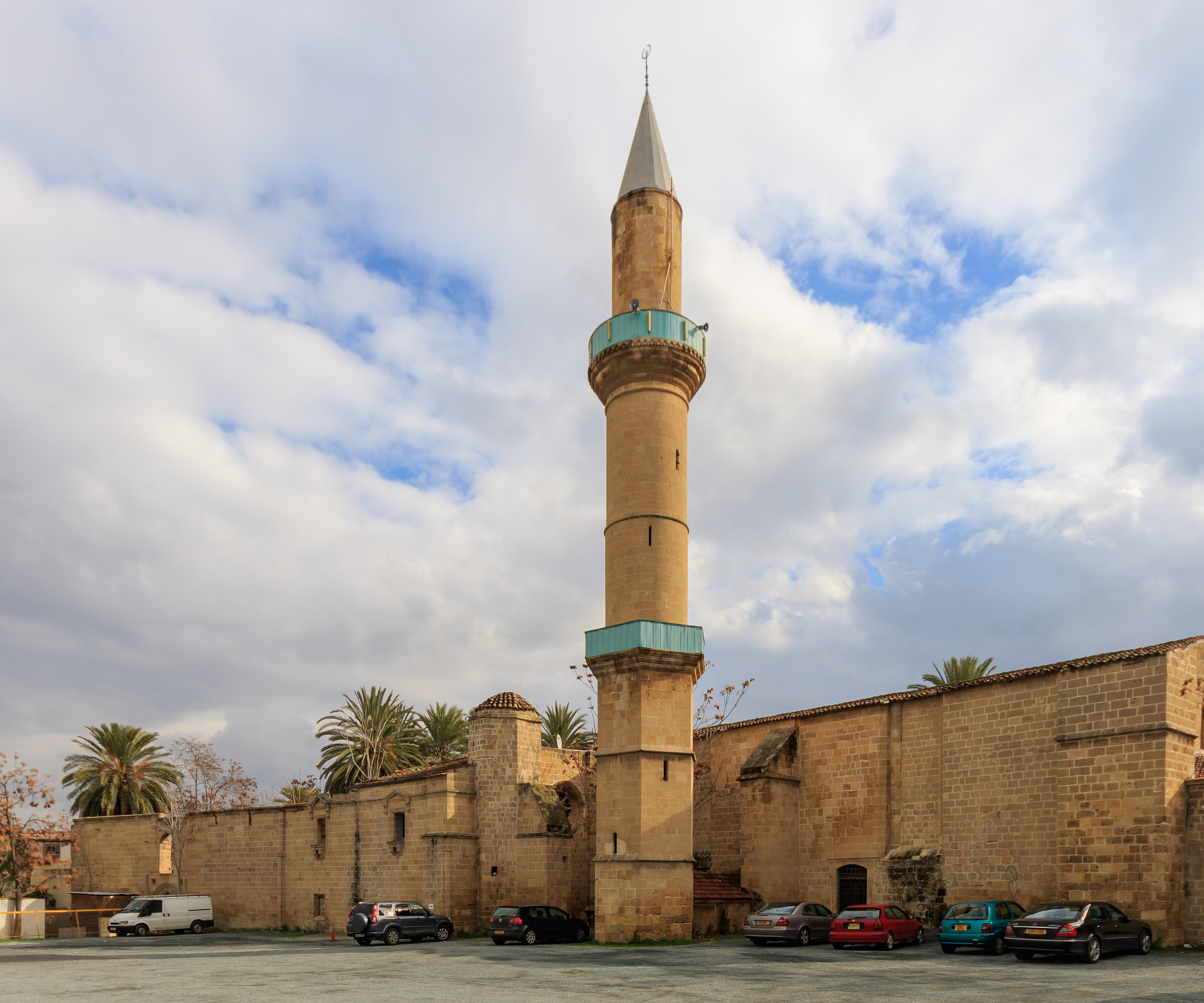
Omeriye Mosque in Nicosia

Historically Nicosia (both north and south) hosts over 15 mosques, either originally constructed as such or converted from a church. The Ömeriye Mosque, formerly known as the Augustinian Church of Saint Mary is a mosque in the walled city of Nicosia, currently located in the south section of Nicosia. Following the Turkish invasion of Cyprus, the mosque gained significance as one of the most important sites of Muslim worship in the non-Muslim section of the island and the city. Currently, the mosque is functioning and open for both worshippers and visitors.

Formerly, the site of the mosque was occupied by the Augustinian Church of Saint Mary, which dated back to the 14th century. During the Ottoman-Venetian War of 1570–1573, the church was first heavily damaged during the siege of Nicosia in 1570, and was eventually levelled after the war.

After the Turkish conquest of Cyprus, Lala Mustafa Pasha, the Ottoman commander, ordered a mosque to be built on the site of the former church, based on a popular belief that Umar, second caliph of Islam, was buried at this site in 7th century.

According to Turkish Cypriot folklore, the Ömeriye Mosque is the first mosque where Turks prayed on the island following its conquest in 1571.

== Culture ==
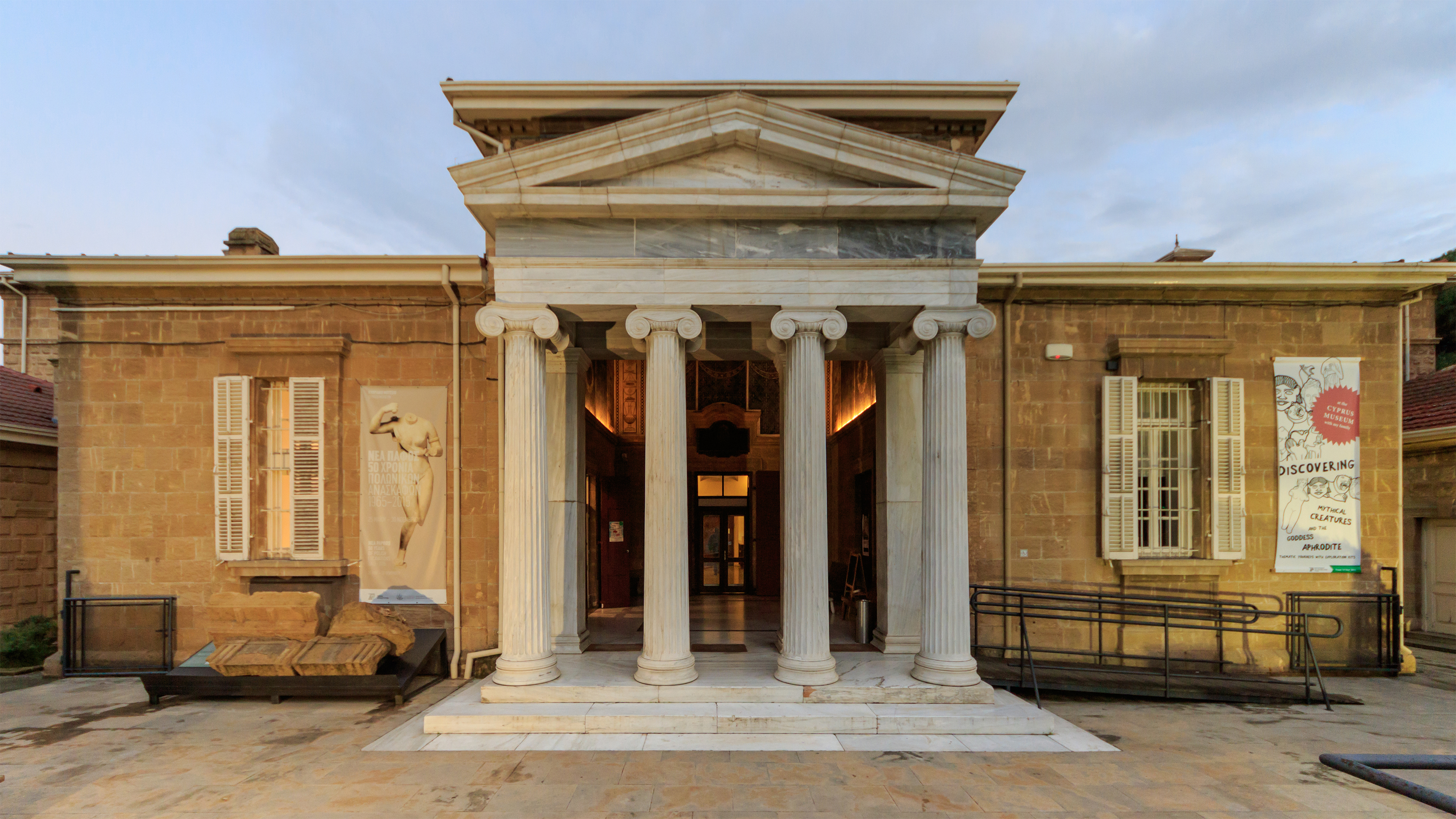
Cypriot Archeological Museum

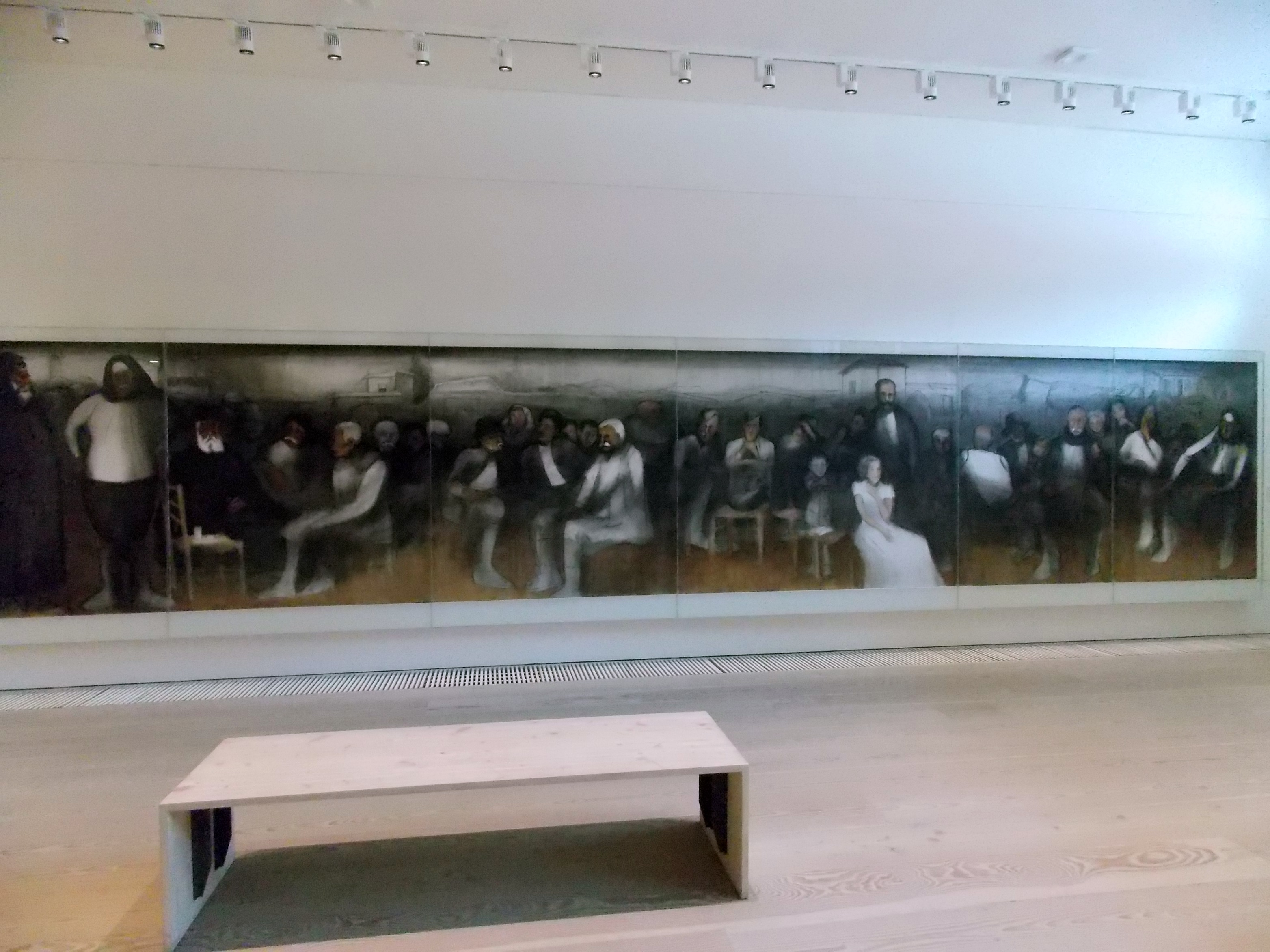
The World of Cyprus, an acrylic painting with a total length of 17.5 meters by Adamantios Diamantis in Leventis Gallery

The Cyprus Museum is the largest and oldest archaeological museum in Cyprus. In old Nicosia, the Ethnological Museum (Hadjigeorgakis Kornesios Mansion) is the most important example of surviving urban architecture of the late Ottoman rule. Today, the mansion which was awarded the Europa Nostra prize for its exemplary renovation work, functions as a museum where a collection of artifacts from the Byzantine, Medieval and Ottoman periods are displayed. Other museums in Nicosia include the Cyprus Museum of Natural History and the Leventis Municipal Museum of Nicosia and Von World Pens Hall in the south. In the north, the Dervish Pasha Mansion, similar in architecture to the Hadjigeorgakis Kornesios Mansion, serves as an ethnological museum, displaying Ottoman and archaeological artifacts. Other museums include the Lusignan House, the Mevlevi Tekke Museum, associated with the sect of the Whirling Dervishes, and the Lapidary Museum.

Art galleries in Nicosia include the Leventis Gallery, which hosts over 800 paintings from Cypriot, Greek or European artists.

Nicosia offers a wide variety of musical and theatrical events, organised either by the municipality or independent organisations. Halls and theatres used for this purpose include:

- The Cyprus National Theater, which contains two performance spaces:
  - the 550-seat Lyric Theater with a bold exterior but an intimate theatrical environment. Its design minimises the distance from actor to audience;
  - the 150-seat New Theater, which is an open-ended workshop space, with simple galleries around the room. The stage can be set in the centre, at the ends, or to one side of the room, and the space can be opened to the private garden beyond.
- The Pallas Cinema-Theater which was renovated from a near derelict state in 2008.
- Theatro Ena
- Maskarini Theater
- Dionysos Theater
- Melina Mercouri Hall
- Theatro Dentro

Nicosia's universities also boast an array of facilities, and many churches and outdoor spaces are used to host cultural events. The Near East University hosts the Atatürk Cultural and Conference centre, with 700 seats.

Nicosia hosted the Miss Universe 2000 pageant.

In June 2011, Nicosia launched a failed campaign to become the European Capital of Culture for 2017.

== Education ==
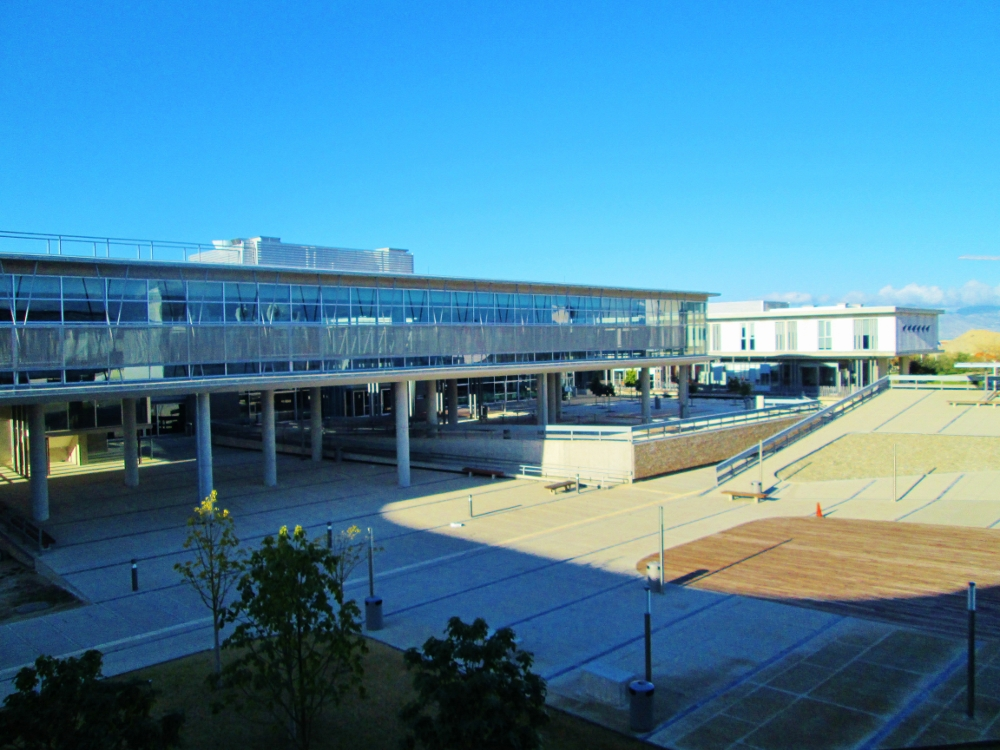
Section of the modern buildings of the University of Cyprus (UCY)

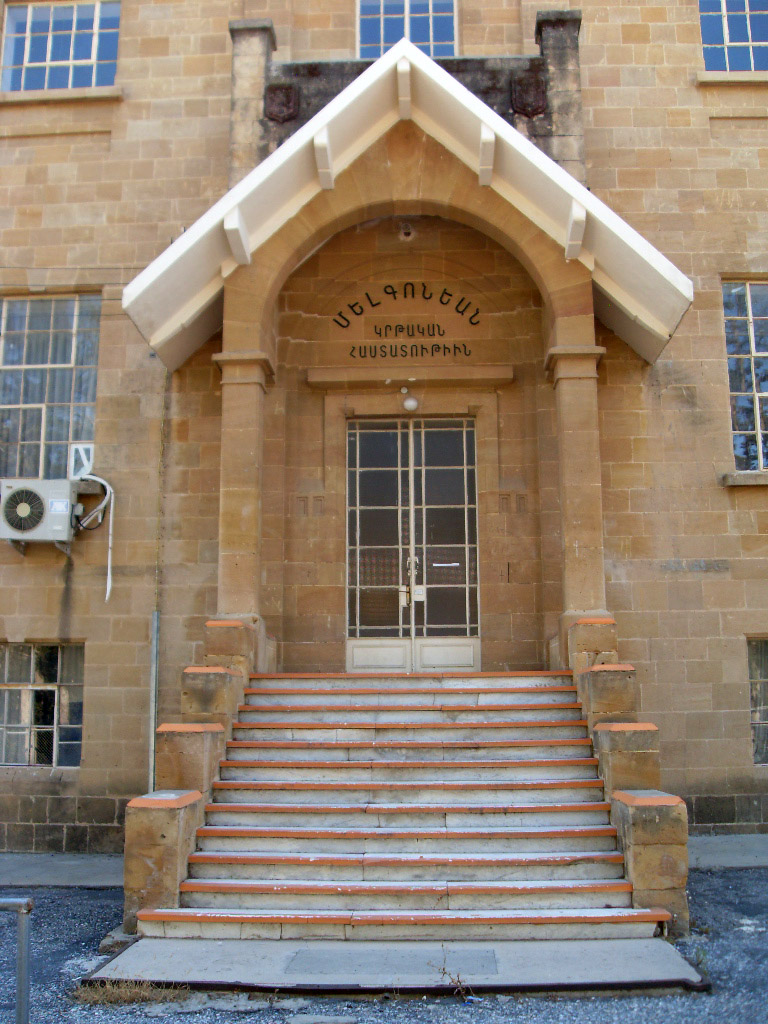
An entrance to the Melkonian Educational Institute

Nicosia has a large student community as it is the seat of five universities, the University of Cyprus (UCY), the University of Nicosia, the European University Cyprus, the Open University of Cyprus and Frederick University. In addition, the city is home to the oldest still-operational high-school in Cyprus, Pancyprian Gymnasium.

Nicosia is also home to one of the largest historic Armenian schools, the Melkonian Educational Institute established in 1926 and operated until 2005. The Melkonian Institution was created as an orphanage in the aftermath of the Armenian genocide of 1915–1923.

== Economy ==
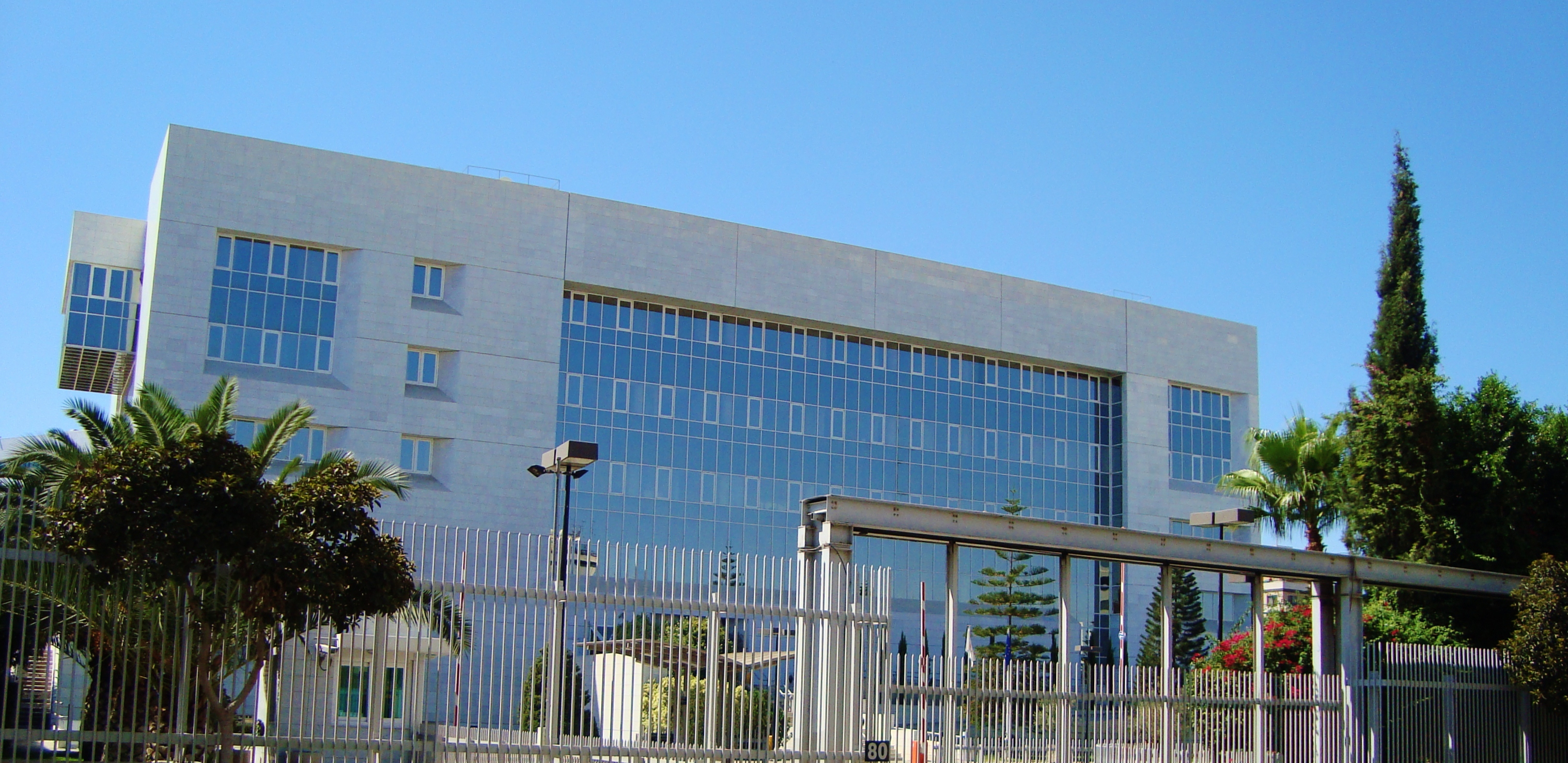
Central Bank of Cyprus

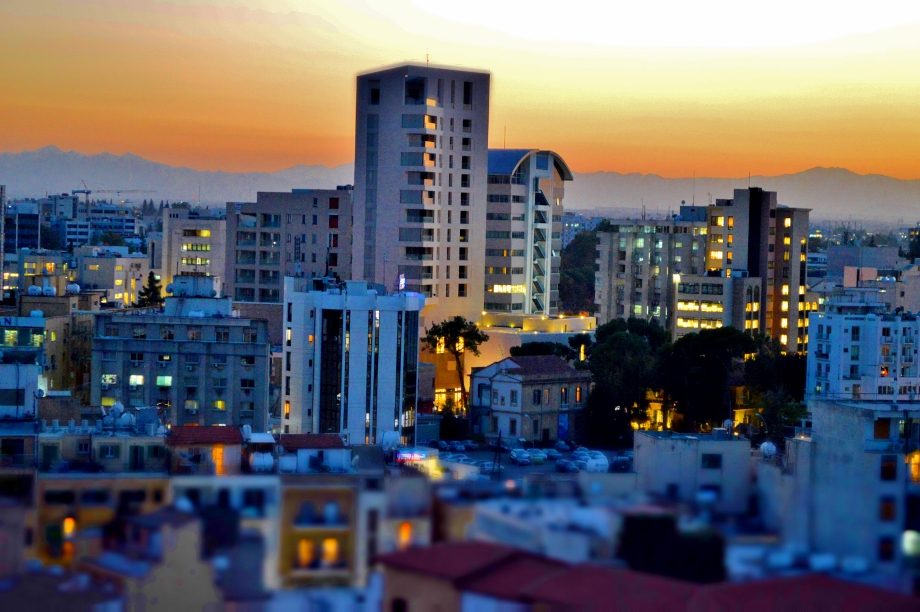
View of Nicosia Financial Quarter

Nicosia is the financial and business heart of Cyprus. The city hosts the headquarters of all Cypriot banks, namely the former Cyprus Popular Bank (also known as Laiki Bank), Bank of Cyprus, and the Hellenic Bank and the Central Bank of Cyprus. A number of international businesses base their Cypriot headquarters in Nicosia, such as the big four accounting firms PWC, Deloitte, KPMG and Ernst & Young. International technology companies such as NCR and TSYS have their regional headquarters in Nicosia. The city is also home to local financial newspapers such as the Financial Mirror and Stockwatch. Cyprus Airways had its head offices in the entrance of Makariou Avenue. The largest mall in Cyprus, Nicosia Mall, is located in the city. According to a UBS survey in August 2011, Nicosia is the wealthiest per capita city of the Eastern Mediterranean and the tenth richest city in the world by purchasing power in 2011.

== Transport ==
=== Bus ===
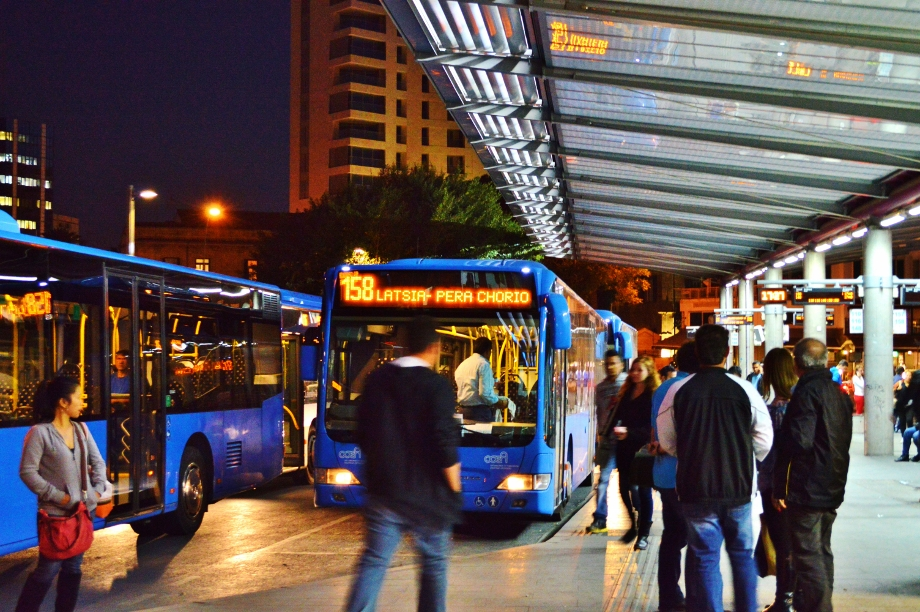
Public buses run by OSEL, in Solomos Square

Public transport within the district is served by Nicosia Public Transport, a subsidiary of Cyprus Public Transport. Bus service used to be operated by OSEL (Nicosia District Transport Organisation) until 2020, but the company ceased to operate after fraud claims.

In the northern part, LETTAŞ provides this service.

=== Train ===
There is no operating train network in Cyprus. Plans for the creation of an intercity railway have been made, but none has materialised. The first railway line on the island was the Cyprus Government Railway which operated from 1905 to 1951. It was closed down due to financial reasons. It used to stop in the city.

=== Proposed tram network ===
In 2010, as part of the Nicosia Integrated Mobility Plan, a pre-feasibility study for a proposed tram network has taken place and sponsored by the Ministry of Communications and Works. The study compared two scenarios, with and without the operation of a tramway in terms of emitted polluting loads.

=== Motorways ===
Nicosia is linked with other major cities in Cyprus via a modern motorway network. The A1 motorway to the south, connects Nicosia with Limassol, which continues onto the A6 going from Limassol to Paphos. The A2 to the southeast, links Nicosia with Larnaca, continuing onto the A3 going from Larnaca to Ayia Napa. The A9 to the west, connects Nicosia to the western Nicosia district villages and the Troodos mountains. The A22 Ring Road is currently under construction, which is planned to bypass the city.

=== Airports ===
The capital is linked, via road, to the 2 international airports under the Republic's administration, Larnaca International Airport (located approx. 50 km (31 mi) south-east from the city) and Paphos International Airport (approx. 100 km (62 mi) south-west).

Nicosia International Airport interior, 2010

The island's largest airport in the past, Nicosia International Airport, ceased commercial operations in 1974, after the Turkish invasion. It is located within the Green Line buffer zone, and is used as the headquarters of the United Nations Peacekeeping Force in Cyprus.

Ercan International Airport is 13 km (8.1 mi) away from Nicosia. Flights to the airport are banned internationally due to the ongoing Cyprus dispute. Non-stop flights only take place from Turkey, and all planes that fly to Northern Cyprus from other countries have to stop over in Turkey. The Government of the Republic of Cyprus considers the use of Ercan Airport to enter or exit the island illegal, and could result in facing criminal charges when entering (or exiting) the Republic of Cyprus.

=== Taxis ===
Many taxi companies operate in Nicosia. Fares are regulated by law and taxi drivers are obliged to use a taximeter.

=== Cycling ===
In 2011, the Nicosia Municipality introduced the Bike in Action scheme, a bicycle sharing system which covers the Greater Nicosia area. The scheme is run by the Inter-Municipal Bicycle Company of Nicosia.

== Sports ==
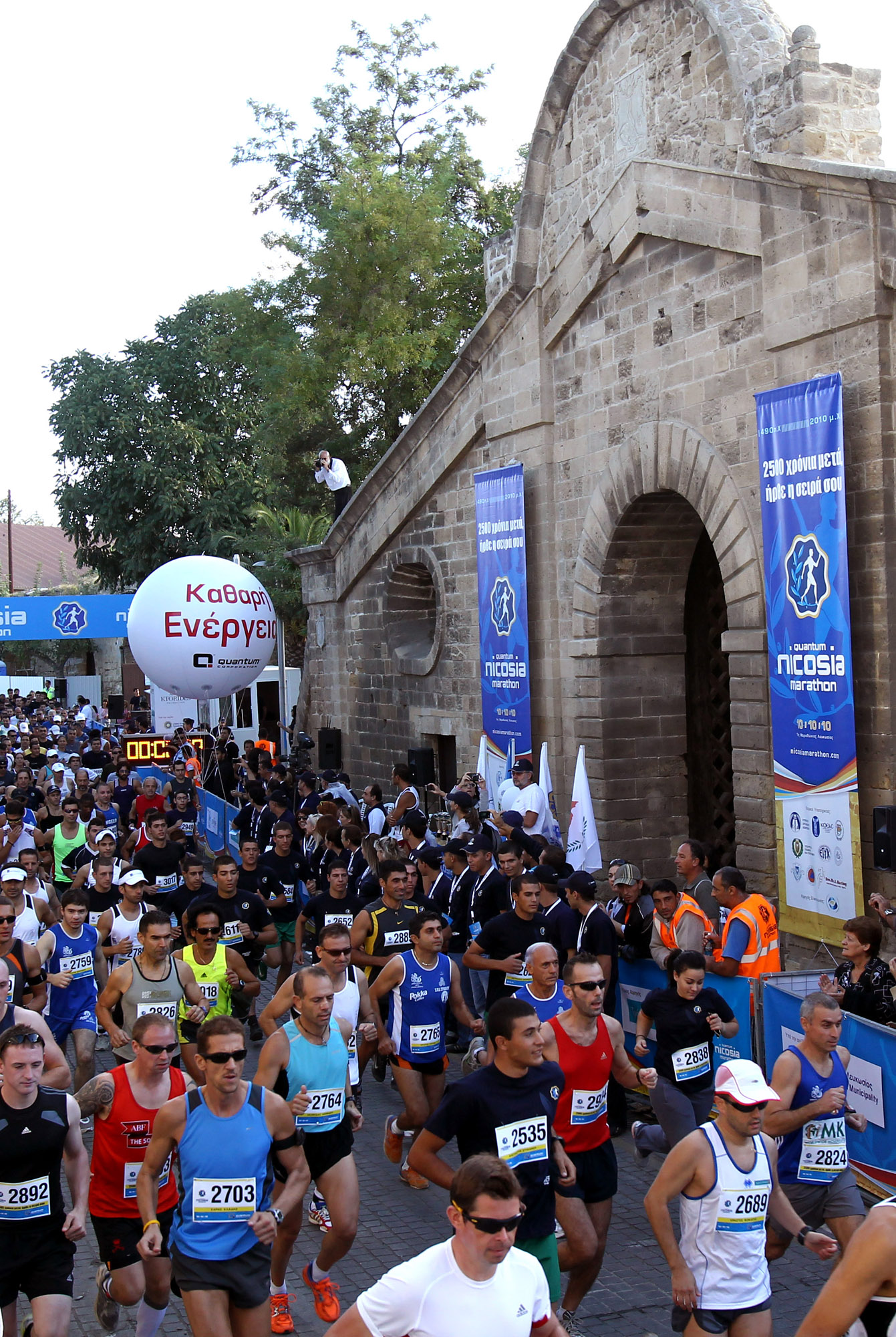
Start of Quantum Nicosia Marathon 2010 at the Famagusta Gate

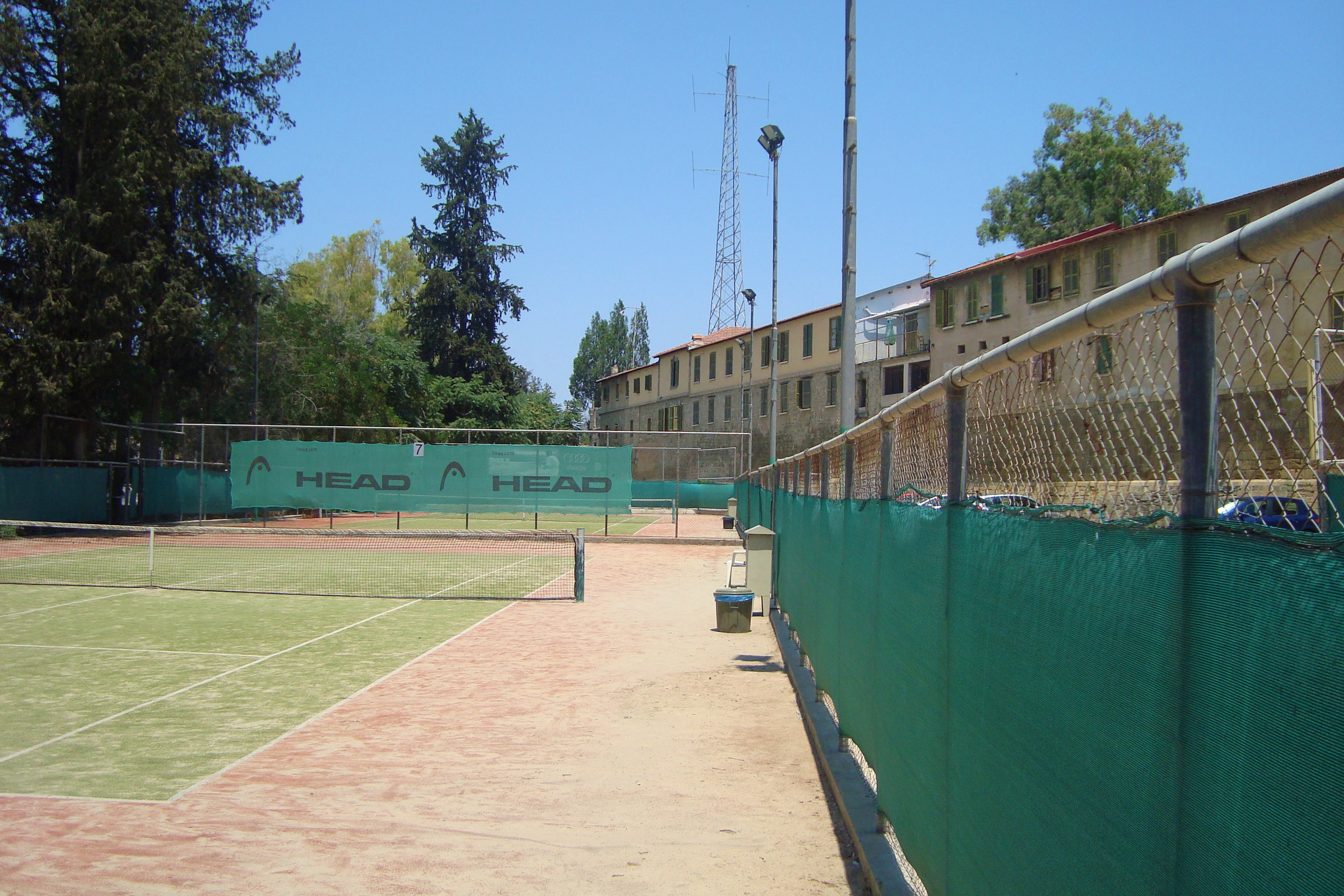
Field club tennis courts

Football is the most popular sport in Cyprus, and Nicosia is home of three major teams of the island; APOEL, Omonia and Olympiakos. APOEL and Omonia are dominant in Cypriot football. There are also many other football clubs in Nicosia and the suburbs. The city also hosts Çetinkaya, Yenicami, Küçük Kaymaklı and Gönyeli, four of the major Turkish Cypriot clubs. Nicosia is also home to AGBU Ararat Nicosia FC, the island's only Armenian FC.

Nicosia is also the home for many clubs for basketball, handball and other sports. APOEL and Omonia have basketball and volleyball sections and Keravnos is one of the major basketball teams on the island. The Gymnastic Club Pancypria (GSP), the owner of the Neo GSP Stadium, is one of the major athletics clubs on the island. Also, all teams in the Futsal First Division are from Nicosia. In addition, two handball teams, European University and SPE Strovolou, are located in Nicosia.

Nicosia has some of the biggest venues on the island; the Neo GSP Stadium, with a capacity of 23,400, is the home for the national team, APOEL, Olympiakos and Omonia. Makario Stadium has a capacity of 16,000. In the north, the Nicosia Atatürk Stadium has a capacity of 28,000. The Eleftheria Indoor Hall is the biggest basketball stadium in Cyprus, with a capacity of 6,500 seats, and is the home for the national team, APOEL and Omonia. The Lefkotheo indoor arena is the volleyball stadium for APOEL and Omonia.

The Nicosia Marathon took place in 2010 and 2012, organised by Athanasios Ktorides Foundation, and attracted more than 7,000 participants.

Nicosia hosted the 2000 ISSF World Cup Final shotgun shooting events. Also, the city hosted two basketball events; the European Saporta Cup in 1997 and the 2005 FIBA Europe All-Star Game in the Eleftheria Indoor Hall. Another event that was hosted in Nicosia was the Games of the Small States of Europe in 1989 and 2009.

== Notable people ==
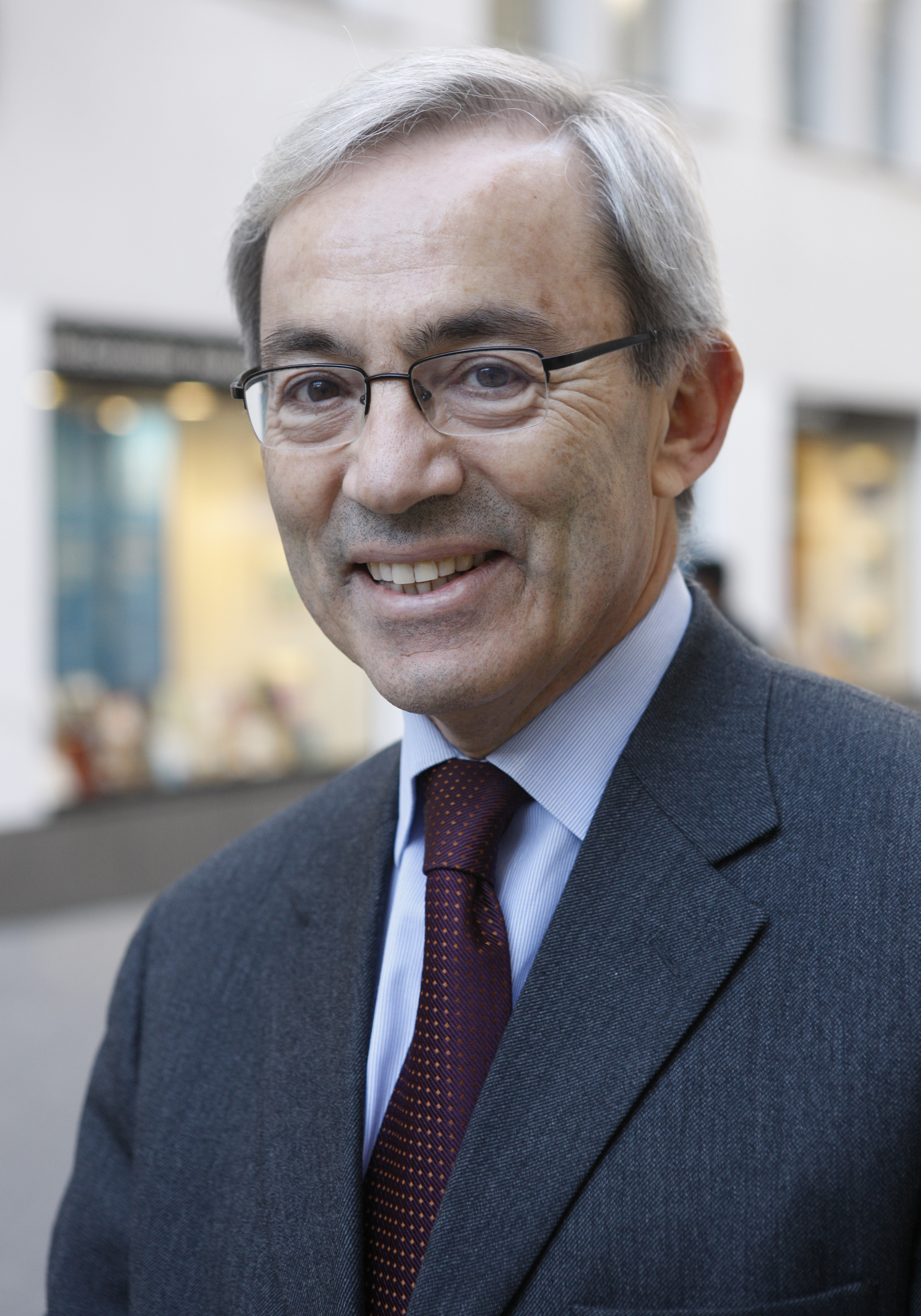
Christopher A. Pissarides, Nobel Prize winner in Economics

- Peter I of Cyprus (1328–1369), King of Cyprus
- Kıbrıslı Mehmed Kamil Pasha (1833–1913), Grand Vizier of the Ottoman Empire
- Fazıl Küçük (1906–1984), former Vice President of the Republic of Cyprus (1960–1963)
- Glafkos Klerides (1919–2013), former President of the Republic of Cyprus (1993–2003)
- Tassos Papadopoulos (1934–2008), former President of the Republic of Cyprus (2003–2008)
- Marios Garoyian, former President of the House of Representatives of Cyprus (2008–2011)
- Benon Sevan, Assistant Secretary-General of the United Nations (1992–2005) and the Head of the Oil for Food program (1996–2005)
- Nicos Tornaritis, politician and jurist, member of the House of Representatives and Consultant of the Republic of Cyprus
- Neoklis Kyriazis (1877–1956), historian and member of the National Council of Cyprus
- Alparslan Türkeş (1917–1997), Turkish nationalist politician, founder of the Nationalist Movement Party in Turkey
- Kutlu Adalı (1935–1996), journalist, poet and socio-political researcher and peace advocate
- Christopher A. Pissarides, Nobel Prize winner in Economics
- Mustafa Djamgoz, professor of cancer biology at Imperial College London
- Manoug Parikian (1920–1987), violinist and violin professor in the UK
- Suat Günsel (born 1952), businessman and founder of the Near East University
- Nicolas Economou (1953–1993), concert pianist, composer, arranger, conductor and organiser of music festivals
- Mick Karn (1958–2011), musician
- Sevgül Uludağ (born 1958), journalist, activist
- Alkinoos Ioannidis (born 1969), singer
- Michalis Hatzigiannis (born 1978), singer
- Michael Bisping (born 1979), mixed martial artist
- Diam's (born 1980), French rap singer
- Stephanie Solomonides (born 1982), first Cypriot to reach North and South Poles
- Giorgos Papadopoulos (born 1985), composer, singer
- Hovig (born 1989), singer, represented Cyprus at the Eurovision Song Contest 2017
- Hazar Ergüçlü (born 1992), actress on the Turkish drama Medcezir
- Aleksandar Vezenkov (born 1995), basketball player
- Vladimiros Tziortzis (born 1997), racing driver

== International relations ==
=== Twin towns – sister cities ===
==== Nicosia Municipality ====
Nicosia is twinned with:

- Athens, Greece (since 1988)
- Bucharest, Romania (since 2004)
- Doha, Qatar
- Odesa, Ukraine (since 1996)
- Shiraz, Iran (since 1999)

==== Nicosia Turkish Municipality ====
North Nicosia is twinned with:

- Ankara, Turkey
- Bursa, Turkey (since 1990)
- Comrat, Moldova (since 2006)
- Gaziantep, Turkey (since 2009)
- Istanbul, Turkey
- İzmir, Turkey
- Karbinci, North Macedonia (since 2001)
- Aračinovo, North Macedonia (since 2002)

=== Friendly cities ===
==== Nicosia Municipality ====
Nicosia also cooperates with:

- Schwerin, Germany (1974)
- Shanghai, China (1999)

=== Foreign embassies and consulates ===
==== Nicosia ====
At present, Nicosia hosts 42 embassies and 3 high commissions (in bold), 12 consulate generals, 44 consulates and 2 vice consulates (in italics), and 1 representation office.

- **Australia** (Note: Member-state of the Commonwealth of Nations. As such, their embassies to other commonwealth members are formally termed as "high commissions".)
- **Austria**
- Belize
- **Brazil**
- Bulgaria (consulate)
- **Bulgaria** (embassy)
- Burundi
- Cameroon
- Canada
- Central African Republic
- **China**
- Republic of the Congo
- Croatia
- **Cuba**
- Czechia (consulate)
- **Czechia** (embassy)
- Denmark (consulate general)
- Dominica
- Dominican Republic
- **Egypt**
- Estonia (vice consulate)
- Estonia (consulate general)
- EU (representative office)
- Finland (consulate)
- Finland (consulate general)
- **Finland** (embassy)
- **France**
- Gabon
- Georgia (consulate)
- **Georgia** (embassy)
- **Germany**
- **Greece**
- Guatemala
- Guyana
- Holy See (apostolic nunciature)
- Hungary (consulate general)
- **Hungary** (embassy office)
- Iceland (consulate general)
- **India**
- Indonesia
- **Iran**
- **Ireland**
- **Israel**
- **Italy**
- Jamaica
- Japan (consulate)
- **Japan** (embassy)
- **Jordan**
- Kenya
- South Korea (consulate general)
- **Kuwait**
- **Lebanon**
- **Libya**
- Lithuania (consulate general)
- Luxembourg
- Malaysia
- Mali
- Mexico
- Monaco
- Mongolia
- Morocco (vice consulate)
- Myanmar
- Namibia (consulate general)
- Nepal
- **Netherlands**
- New Zealand
- Nicaragua
- Norway (consulate general)
- Oman (consulate)
- **Oman** (embassy)
- **Palestine**
- Panama (consulate)
- Panama (consulate general)
- Papua New Guinea
- Paraguay
- Peru
- Philippines
- **Poland**
- **Portugal**
- **Qatar**
- **Romania**
- **Russia**
- Rwanda
- **Saudi Arabia**
- Serbia (consulate)
- **Serbia** (embassy)
- Seychelles (consulate general)
- **Slovakia**
- South Africa
- **Sovereign Military Order of Malta**
- Spain (consulate general)
- **Spain** (embassy)
- **Sweden**
- **Switzerland**
- **Syria**
- Thailand
- Ukraine (consulate)
- **Ukraine** (embassy)
- **United Arab Emirates**
- **United Kingdom**
- **United States**
- Uruguay
- Uzbekistan

==== North Nicosia ====
The de facto unrecognised state of Northern Cyprus hosts a limited diplomatic community in its capital in the de facto northern part of Nicosia. Foreign missions located in North Nicosia are:

- Australia (High Commission Office)
- EU (Programme Support Office)
- France (Cultural Office)
- Germany (Embassy Office)
- Italy (Embassy Office)
- Russia (Embassy Office)
- Turkey (Embassy)
- United Kingdom (High Commission Office)
- United States (Ambassadorship Office)

== See also ==
- List of divided cities
- List of shopping malls in Cyprus
- Nicosia Music Society
- United Nations Peacekeeping Force in Cyprus
