= Laiki Geitonia =

"Laiki Geitonia"(Greek: Λαϊκή Γειτονιά) is a traditional neighbourhood is the pedestrian area of walled city of Nicosia, Cyprus, opposite to the D'Avila bastion and 0.3 km long from the Eleftheria square. Laiki Geitonia's restoration of houses is an example of traditional Cypriot urban architecture. The buildings date from the end of the 18th Century, with building materials being mainly wood, sandstone and mudbrick. It is a pedestrianised area of narrow winding streets, combining residential houses with craft shops, souvenir shops and tavernas.

The main Tourist Information Centre in Nicosia is located in Laiki Geitonia and a number of walking tours of Nicosia start on Mondays, Thursdays, and Fridays from that place.

== Gallery ==
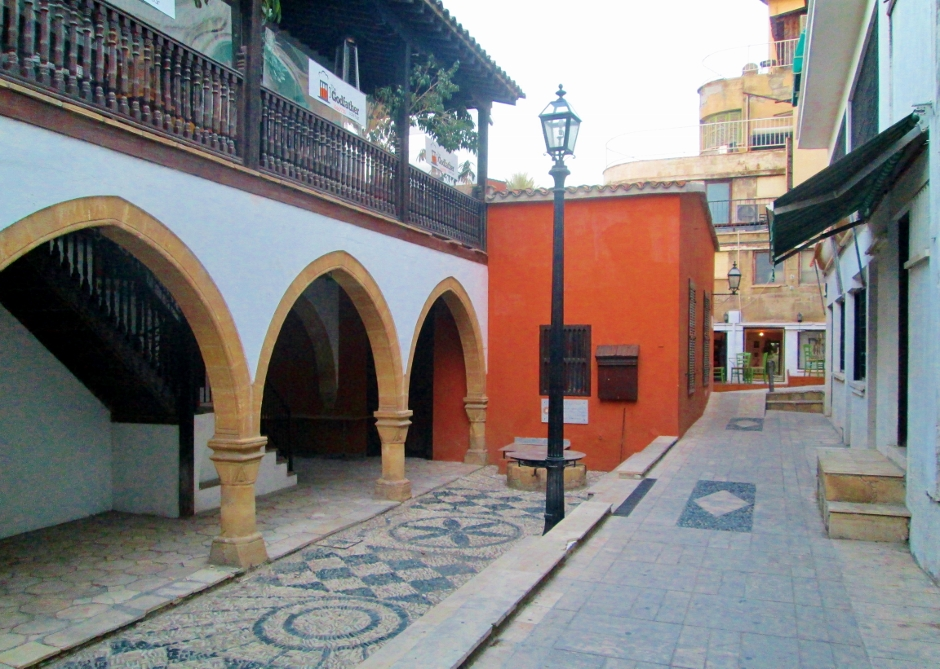
Laiki Geitonia

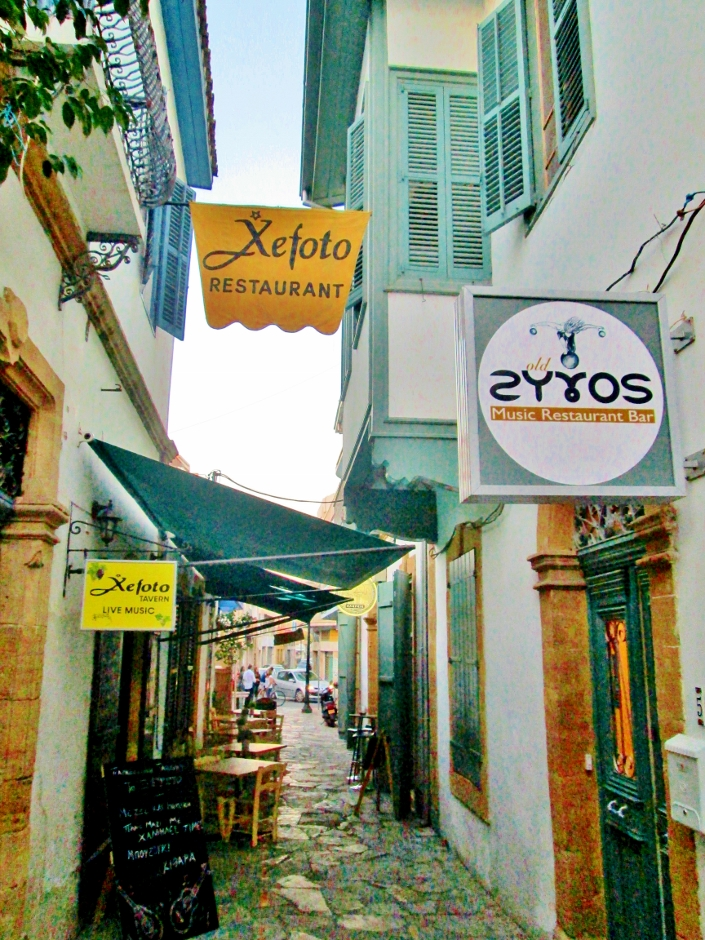
Laiki Geitonia

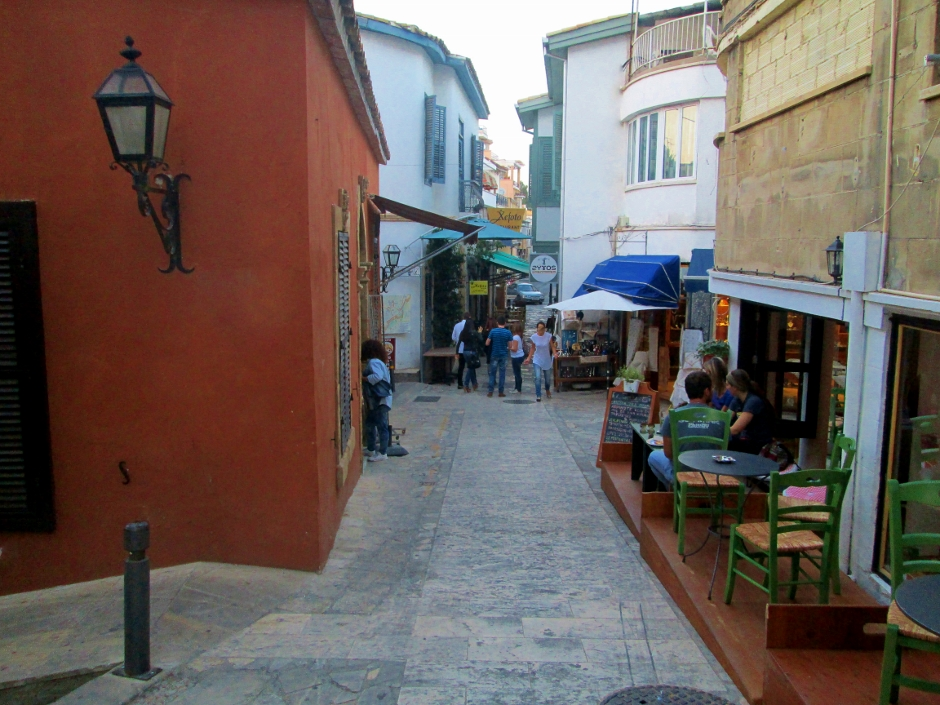
Laiki Geitonia

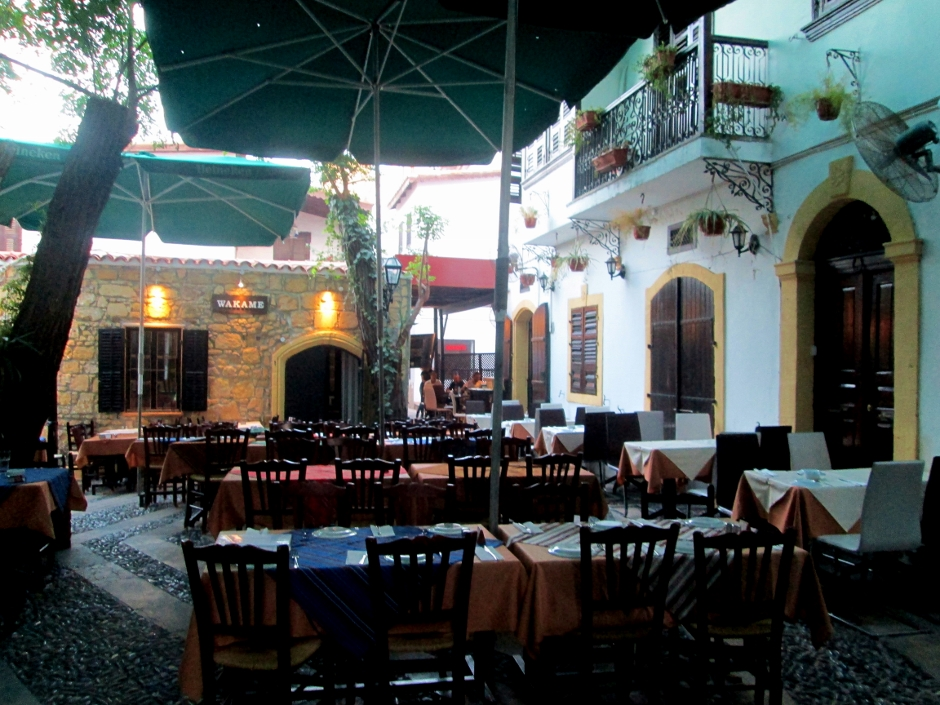
Laiki Geitonia

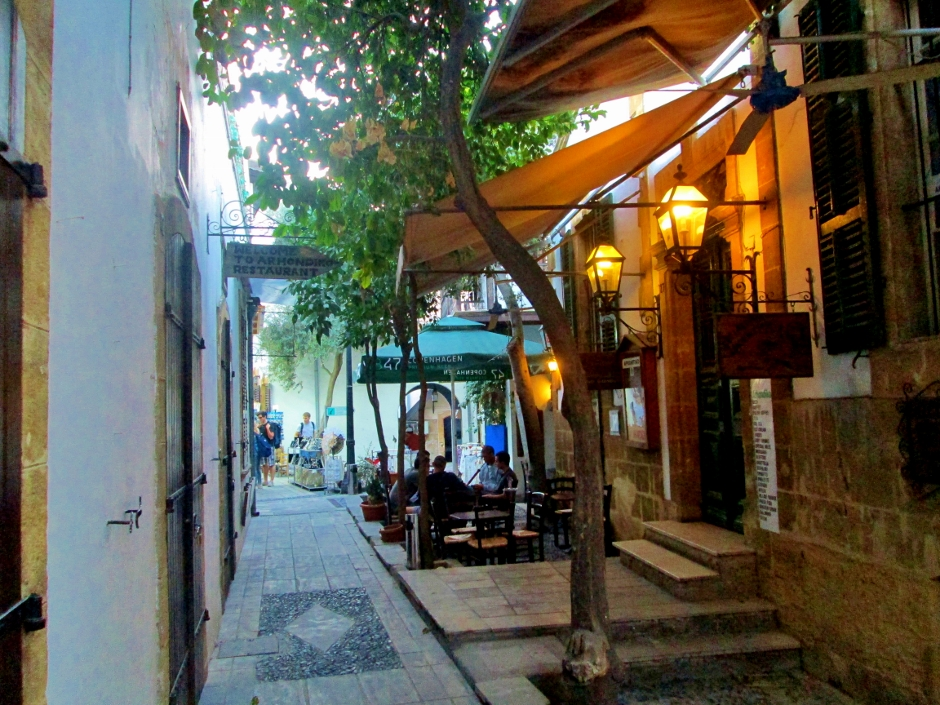
Laiki Geitonia

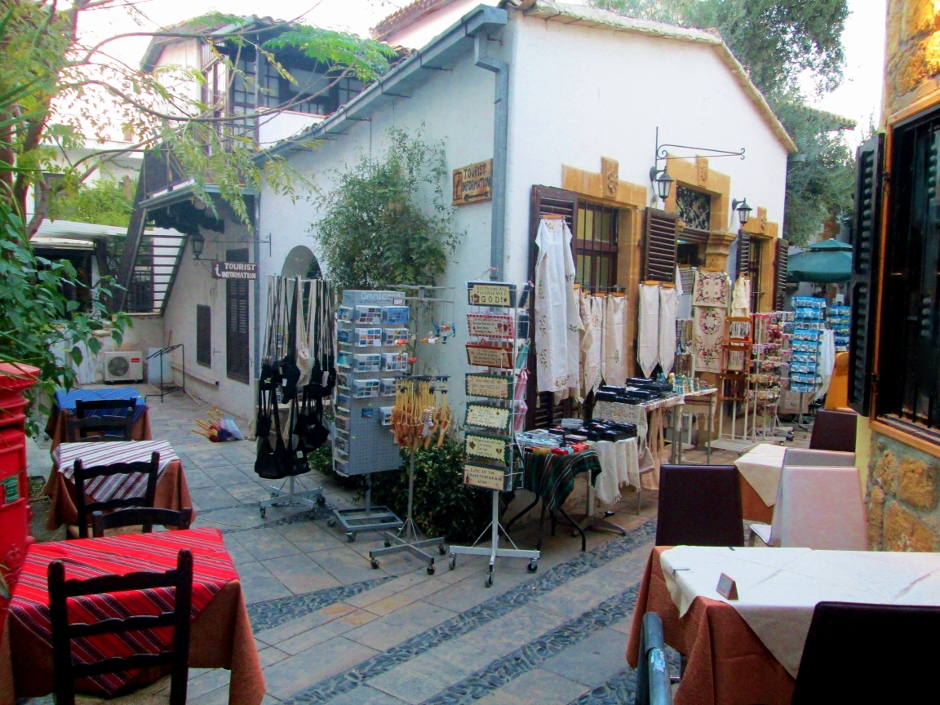
Laiki Geitonia

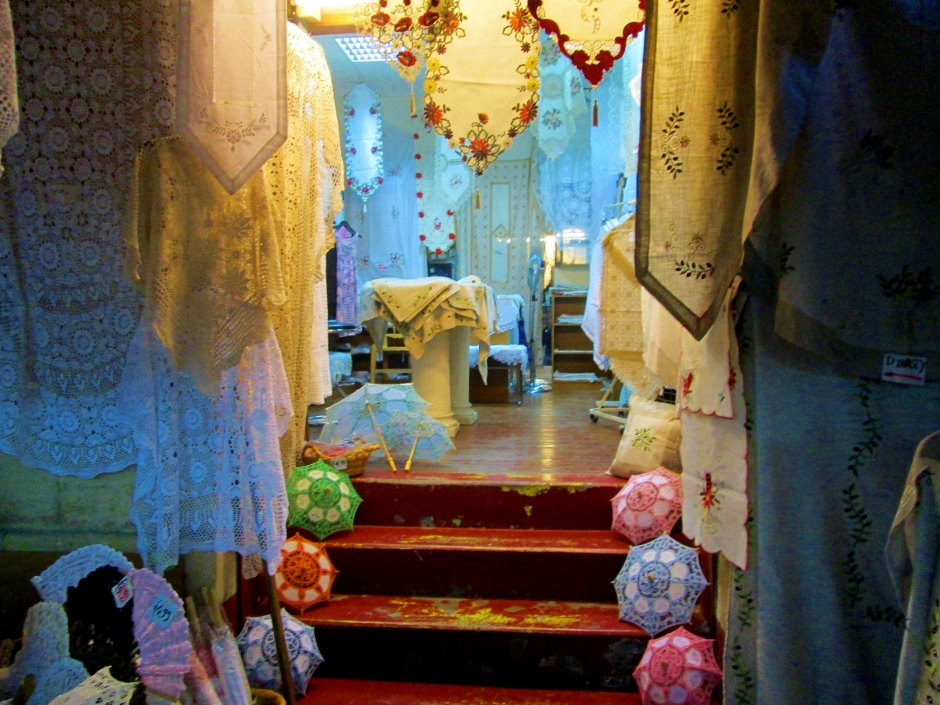
Shop of traditional embroideries in Laiki Geitonia

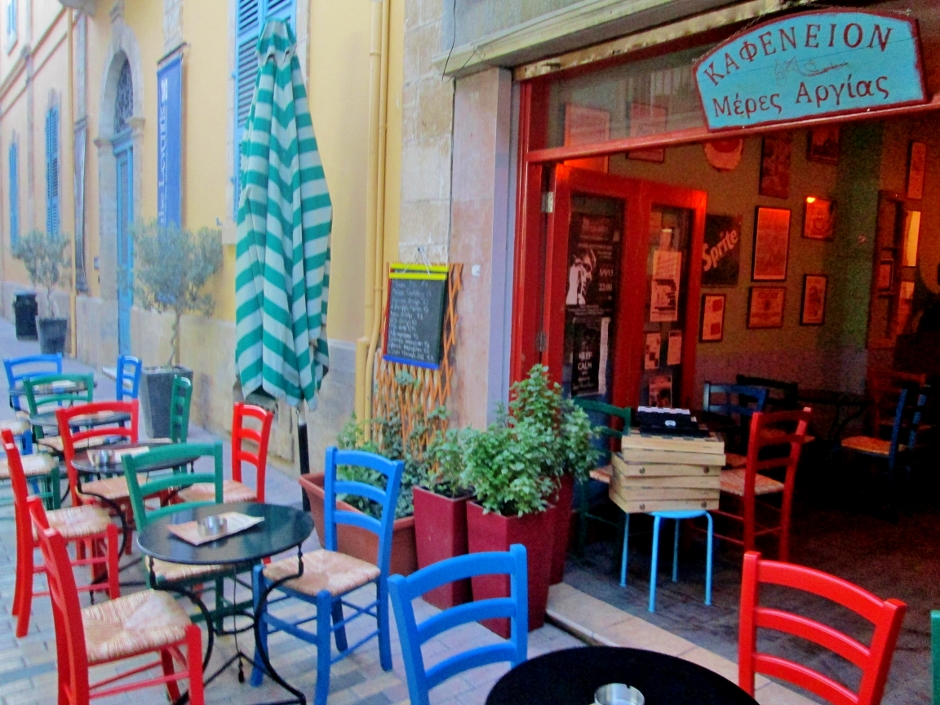
Laiki Geitonia

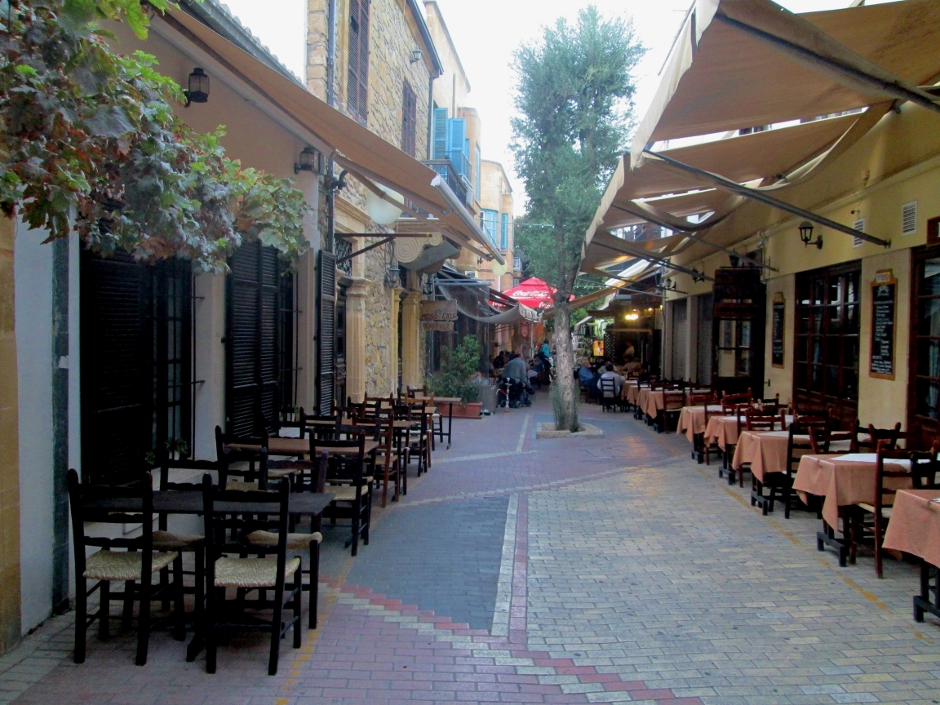
Laiki Geitonia

== See also ==
- Rigenis Street
- Ledra Street
- Onasagorou Street
- Eleftheria Square
