= Solomos Square =

Bus station in Nicosia, Cyprus

- Πλατεία Σολωμού (Greek); Solomos Meydanı (Turkish)
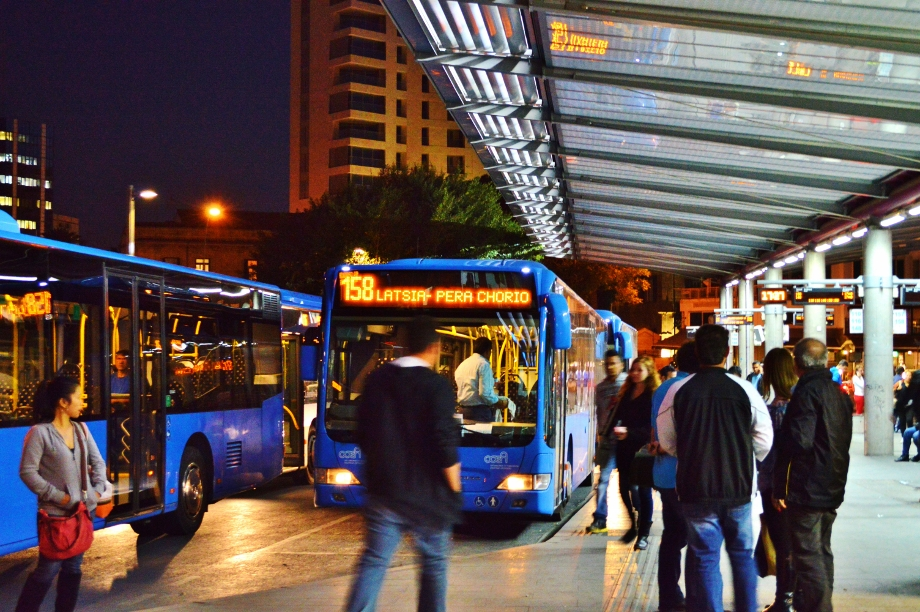
- Interactive map of Solomos Square

General information
- Type: Public, transport
- Location: Nicosia, Cyprus
- Coordinates: 35°10′14″N 33°21′31″E
- Owner: City of Nicosia, CY-EU

Solomos Square (Greek: Πλατεία Σολωμού; Turkish: Solomos Meydanı) is a square at the intersection of Rigenis Street and Omirou Avenue in central Nicosia, Cyprus. It acts as one of the six main bus-hubs of the city, and it is estimated that over 50,000 people pass through it daily. The square was remodelled in 2010, following the initiative of former Mayor Eleni Mavrou.

== Buses ==
In 2022, the Nicosia public bus network was revamped by Cyprus Public Transport (CPT). The project was completed in two phases, beginning on 29 January 2022, and 28 February 2022 for the second phase. Focus was on the decentralisation of Solomou Square as the only bus hub, with the addition of five others. Emphasis was placed on better and faster connectivity to the city, with newer routes and the change of the system's route numbers, as well as 5G Wi-Fi On-Board. Furthermore, the creation of a new bus app (PAME App) has allowed for more convenient travel between stations and even displaying bike-sharing stations.

Other than the city's bus network, Solomou Square is also the main station in Nicosia for InterCity Buses, which is the public bus service which offers transport to all major cities on the island.

== Gallery ==
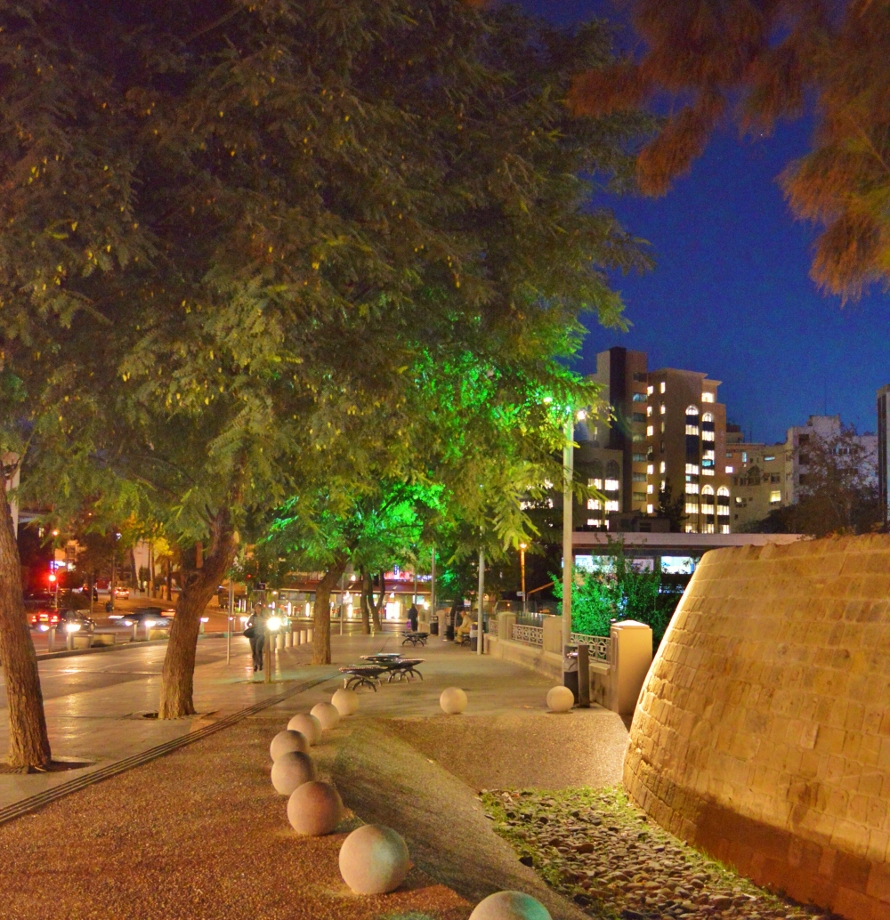
On the left is 'Solomou Square' Street, and on the right is Tripoli Bastion.

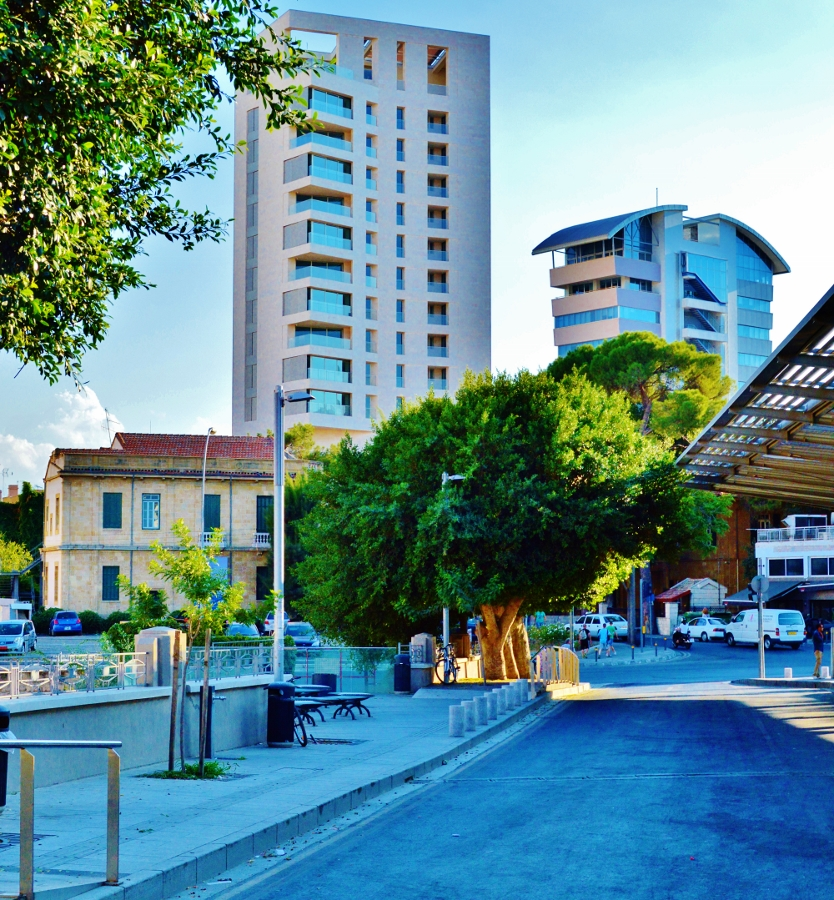
On the left is Eleftheria square, and on the right is Solomou Square.

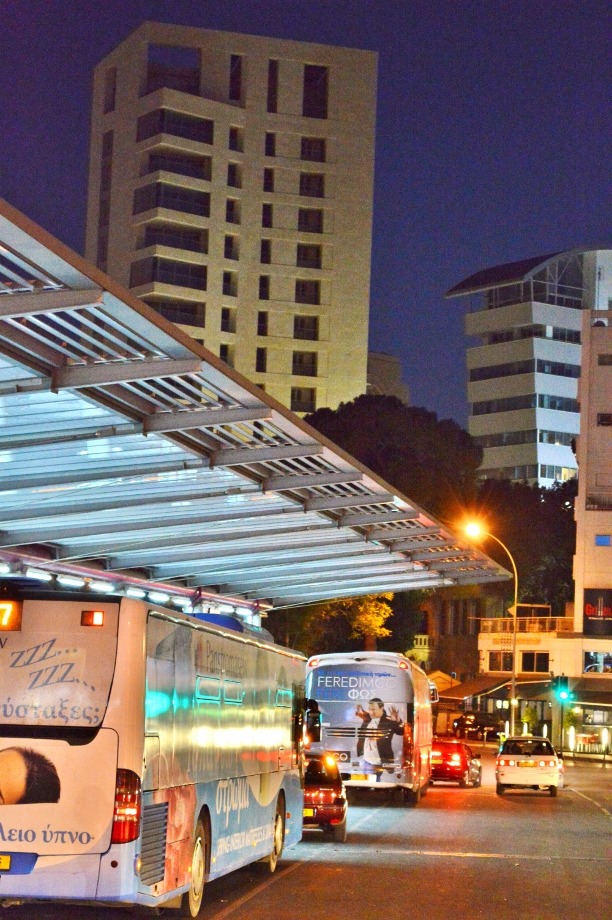
Solomou Square from the west side.

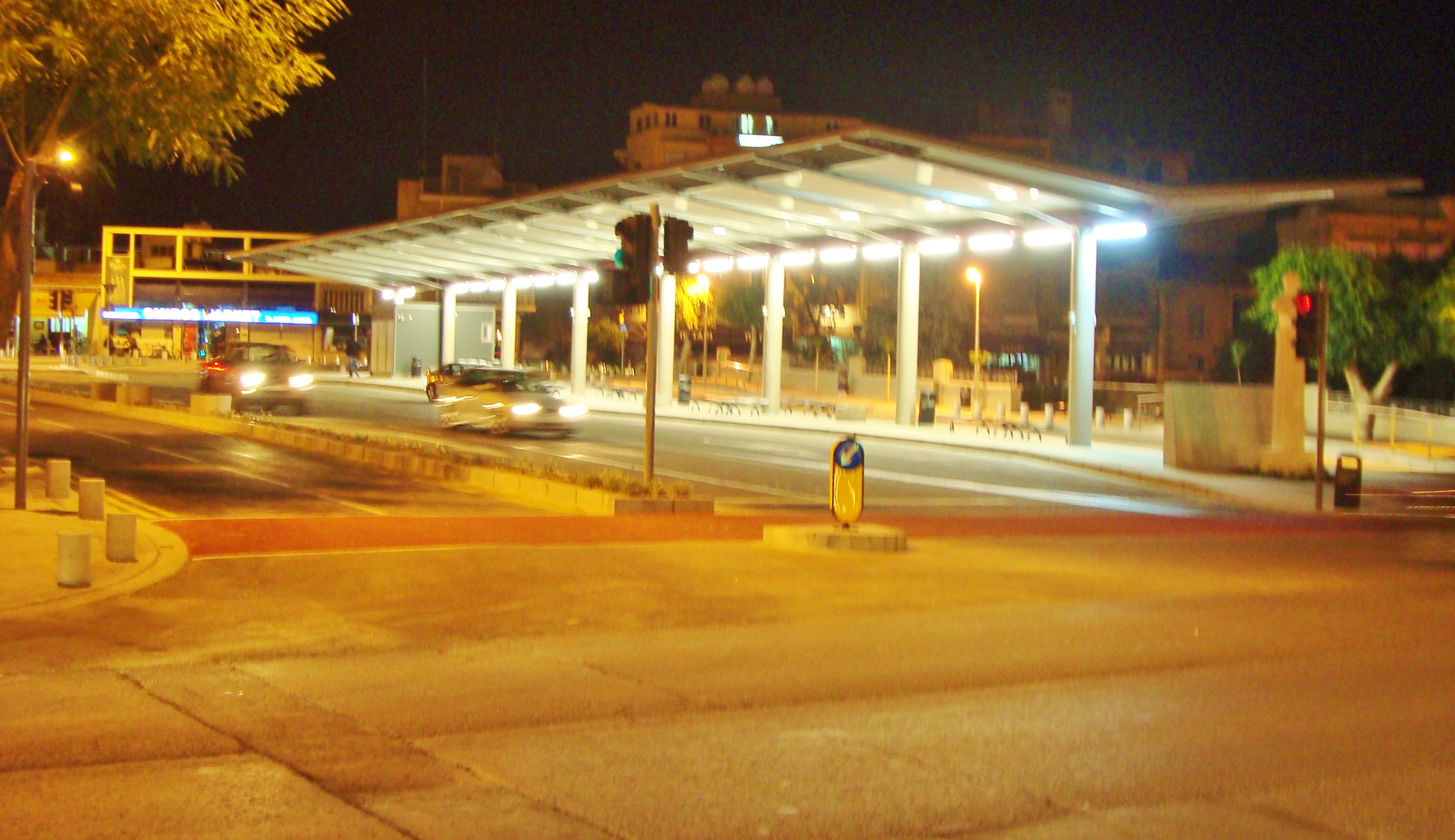
Solomou Square as seen from Omirou Street.

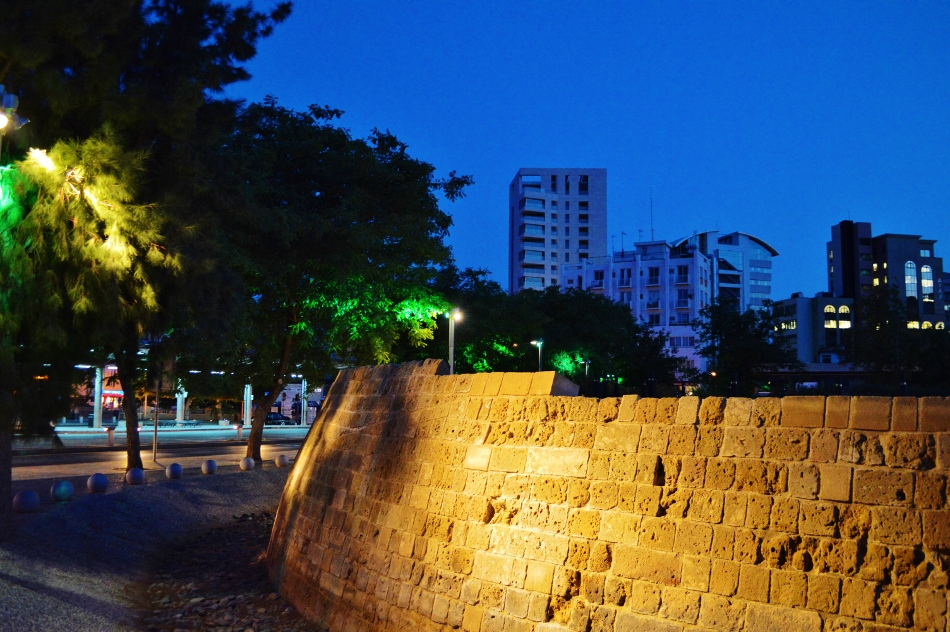
On the left is 'Solomou Square' Street, and on the right is Tripoli Bastion.

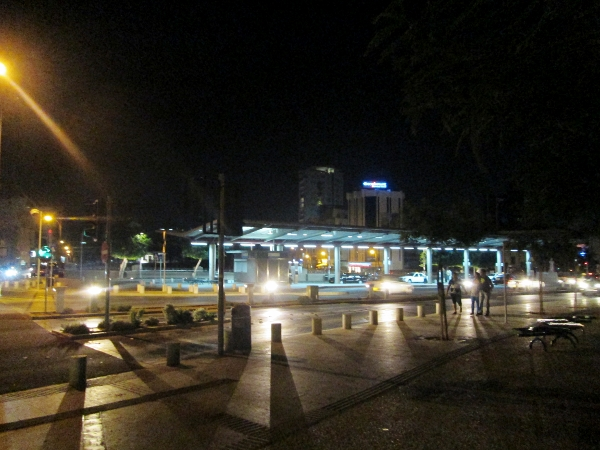
Solomou Square as seen from the Tripoli Bastion.

== See also ==
- Eleftheria square
- Nicosia (city)
- Nicosia District
- Transport in Cyprus
