= Ledra Street =

Shopping thoroughfare in Nicosia, Cyprus

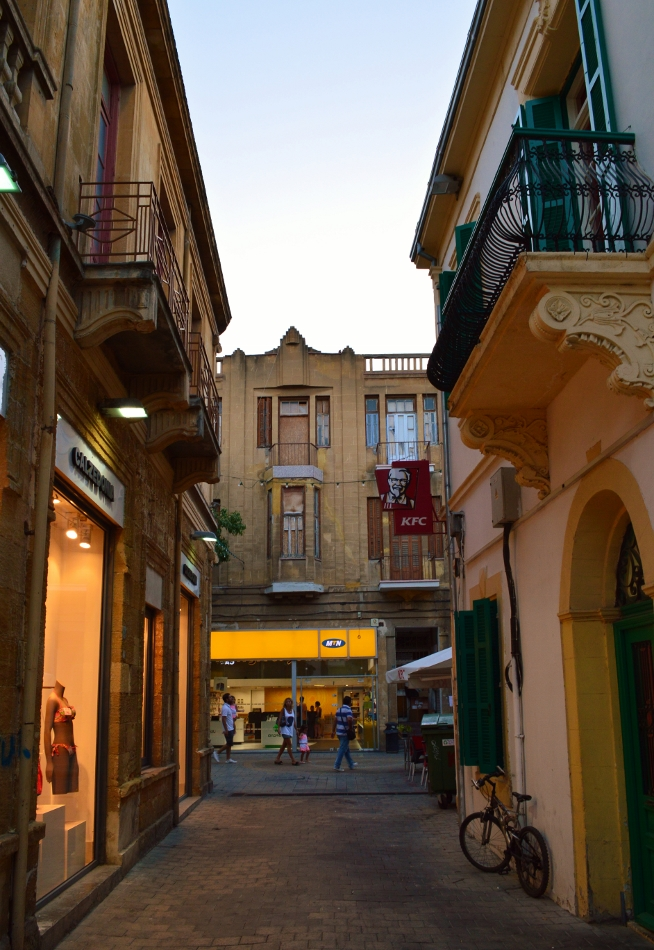
- View of Ledra Street from Socrates Street after sunset
- Interactive map of Ledra Street
- Namesake: Ledra
- Type: Central shopping thoroughfare; predominantly pedestrian
- Location: Nicosia, Cyprus
- Coordinates: 35°10′28″N 33°21′41″E

Ledra Street (Greek: Οδός Λήδρας Odos Lidras; Turkish: Ledra Caddesi/Lokmacı/Uzun yol) is a major shopping thoroughfare in central Nicosia, Cyprus, which links Nicosia with North Nicosia, the part of the city under the control of the de facto Northern Cyprus.

It is the site of the former Ledra Street barricade, across the United Nations buffer zone. The barricade symbolised the division of Nicosia between the Greek south and Turkish north. It was removed in April 2008 and Ledra Street became the sixth crossing between the southern and northern parts of Cyprus. Ledra Street runs parallel to Onasagorou Street.

The name of the street refers to the ancient city-kingdom of Ledra, established in 1050 BC, that was located in the centre of the island where the capital city is today (this location is now the Ledron Archaeological Local Museum).

== Location ==
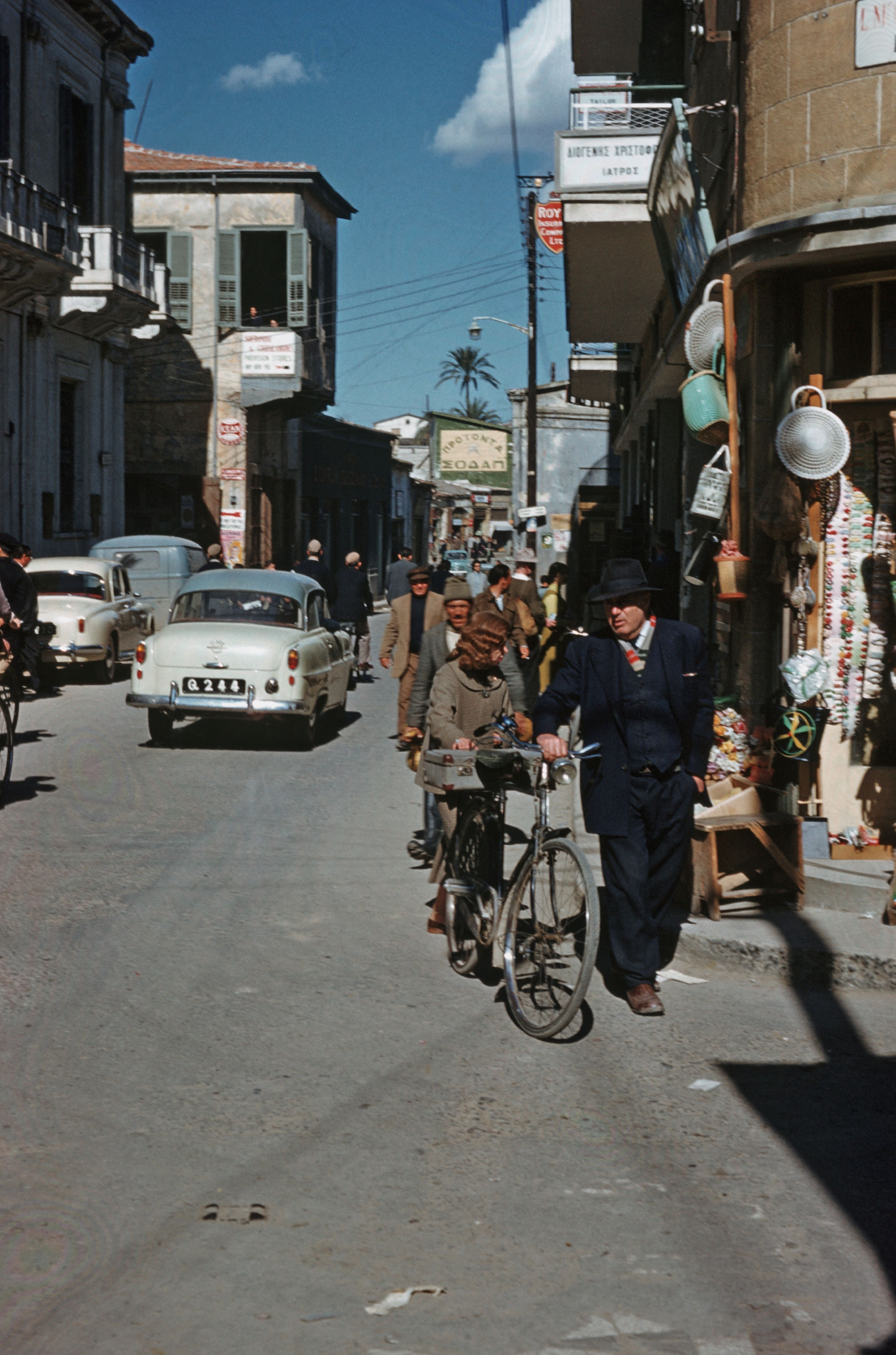
Ledra street in about 1958, when it was known as "Murder Mile"

The street leads off Eleftheria square, runs in a South to North direction and is about 1 km (1000 yards) long. Most of it lies within the area effectively controlled by the Republic of Cyprus while a short stretch at the northern end between the UN buffer zone and the intersection with Arasta Street and Girne Caddesi falls within the Turkish part of Nicosia.

Traditionally, Ledra Street was the main shopping street of the capital, although in recent years it has been superseded by more accessible streets further out from the centre. Properties on the street are largely for commercial use and command some of the highest real estate prices on the island.

== History ==
During the EOKA attacks that ran from 1955–1959, the street acquired the informal nickname The Murder Mile in reference to the frequent targeting of the British military by nationalist fighters along its course.

=== The sealing of Ledra Street ===
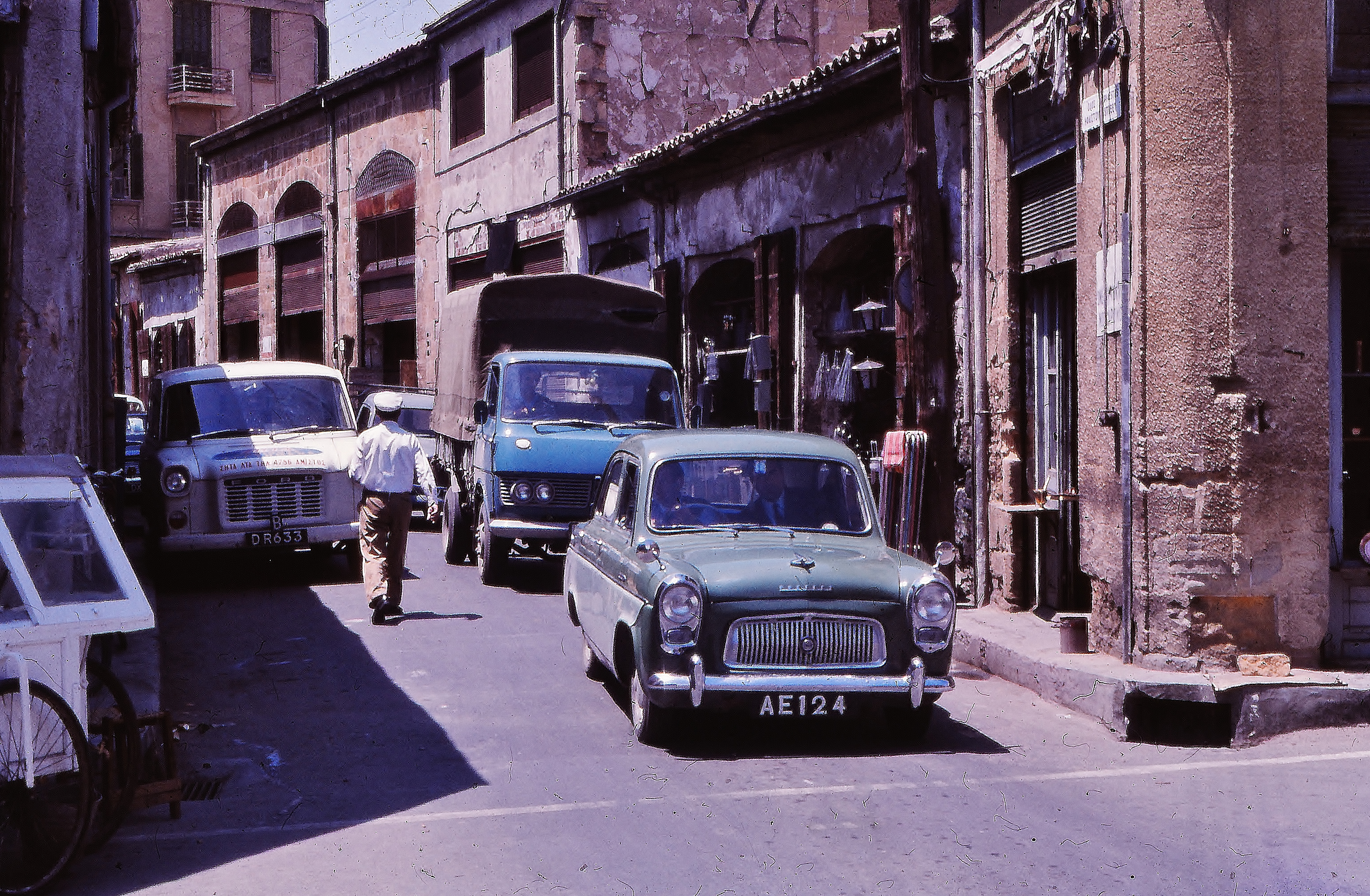
Byway of Ledra Street in 1969

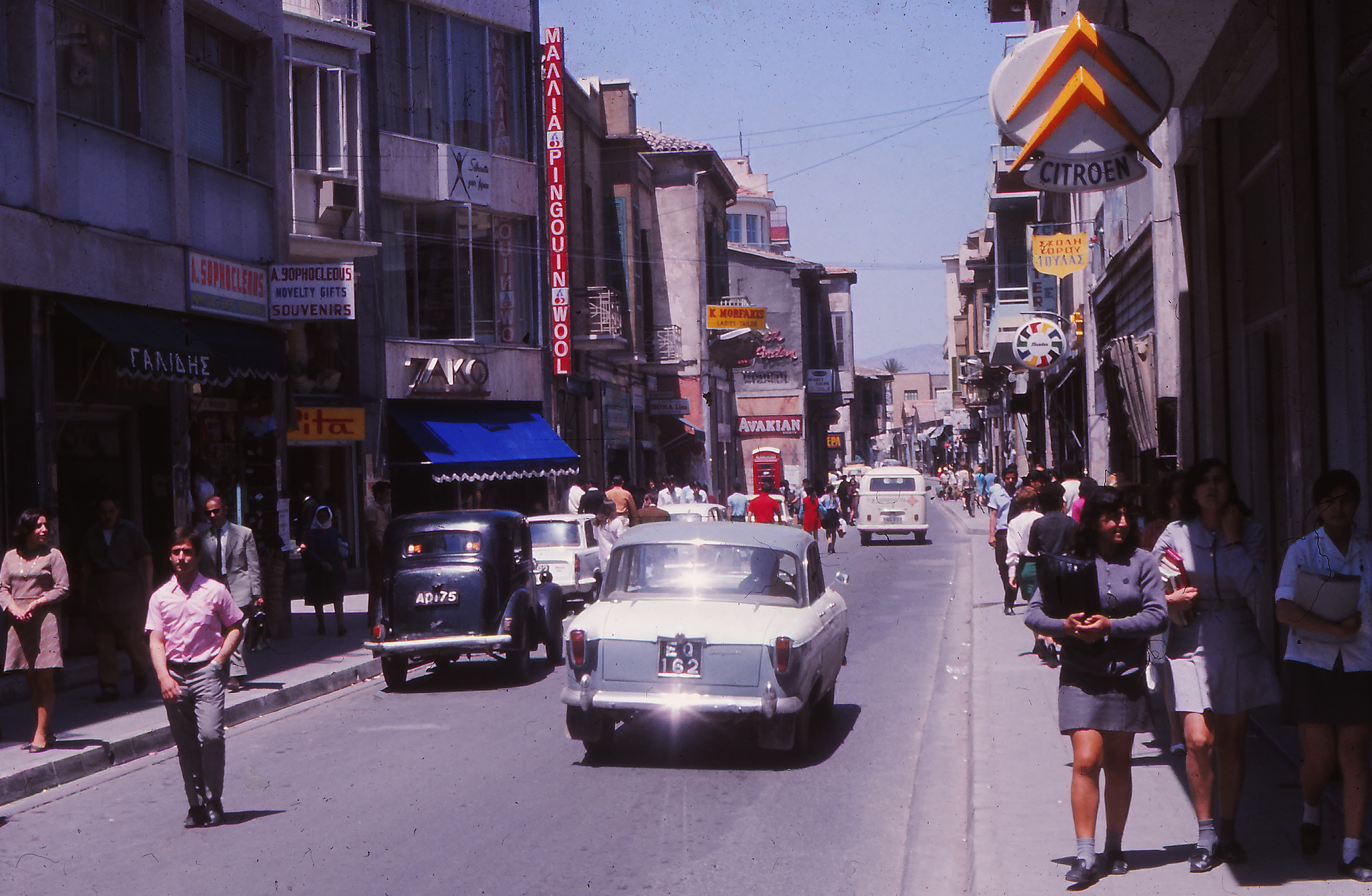
Ledra Street in 1969

In 1963, during the outbreak of hostilities between the Greek and Turkish Cypriot communities following the announcement of unilateral amendments to the Cypriot Constitution, Turkish Cypriots withdrew to North Nicosia which became one of the many Turkish Cypriot enclaves which existed throughout the island. Various streets which ran between the northern and southern part of the city, including Ledra Street, were blockaded. A ceasefire was arranged at the end of 1963 and a neutral zone was established along the ceasefire or Green Line between north and south Nicosia which was patrolled by British military personnel. With the formation of the UNFICYP, the task of patrolling the Green Line and protecting Turkish Cypriot enclaves was taken over by UN troops.

During Turkish army's invasion on Cyprus in 1974, Turkish troops occupied northern Nicosia (as well as the northern part of Cyprus). A buffer zone was established across the island along the ceasefire line to separate the northern Turkish-controlled part of the island, and the government-controlled Greek south. The buffer zone runs through Nicosia, where it is sometimes just several metres wide, and all roads running through the zone have been effectively sealed.

The street south of the blockade was largely pedestrianised in 1998.

=== Earlier attempts at reopening ===
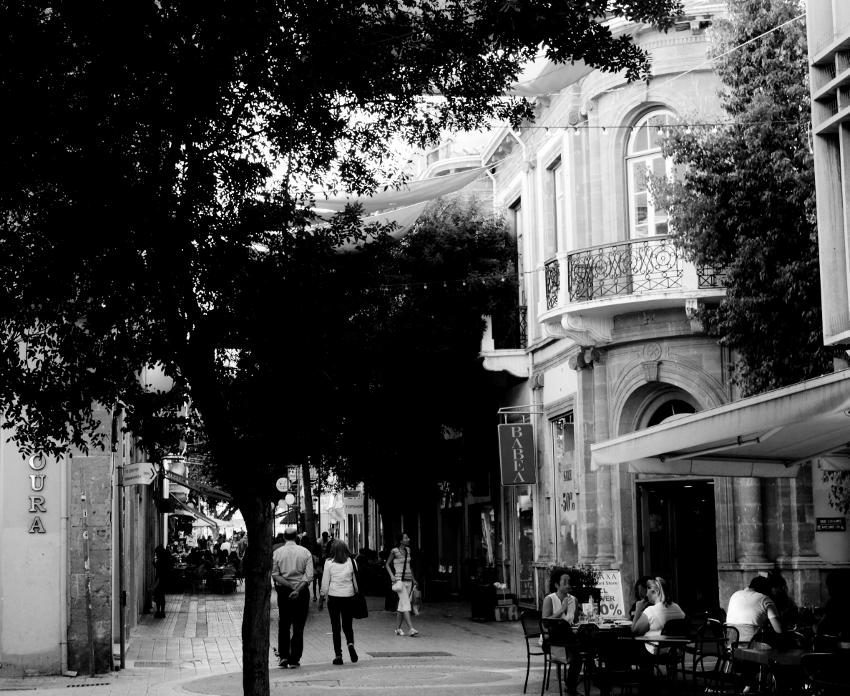
Modern day Ledra Street pedestrianised in 1998.

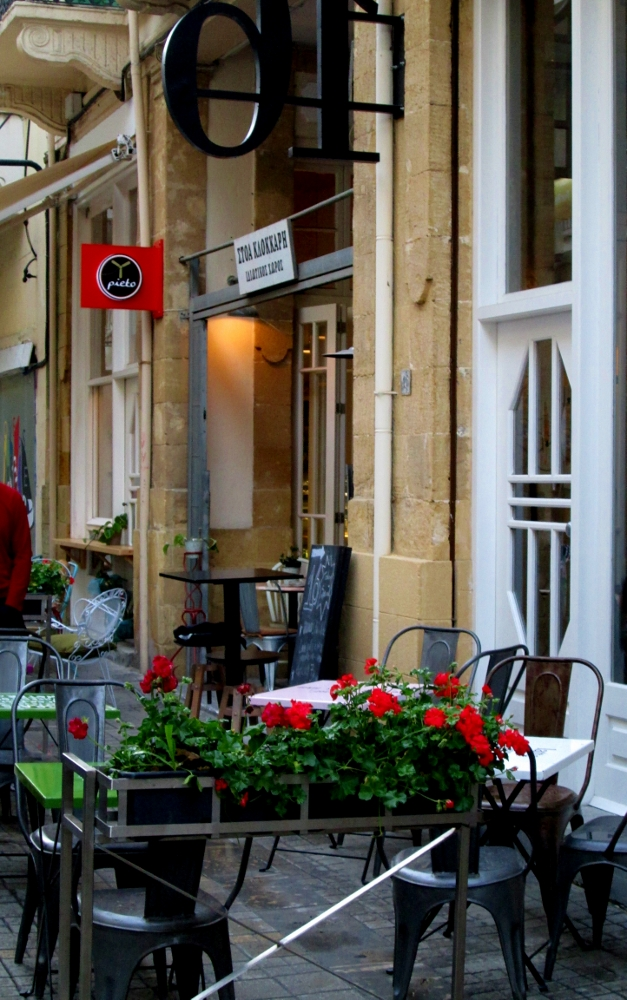
Mandatory placement of flowers between shops and cafes by the Municipality of Nicosia since 2012

In December 2005, as talks between the north and south on the reopening of Ledra Street were on-going, the Turkish Cypriot side demolished the wall between the north and the UN buffer zone and began constructing a footbridge just north of the UN buffer zone. The move attracted protests from both the Greek Cypriot side and UNFICYP. The former expressed concerns over security, saying that the bridge allowed easy access for Turkish armed personnel in the buffer zone, while the latter said although there was no infringement of the buffer zone, it could not support the move to reopen Ledra Street at that time because the actions had not been agreed to by both sides. The Turkish Cypriot side removed the footbridge on 9 January 2007, a move which was welcomed by UNFICYP.

=== Events leading to eventual opening ===
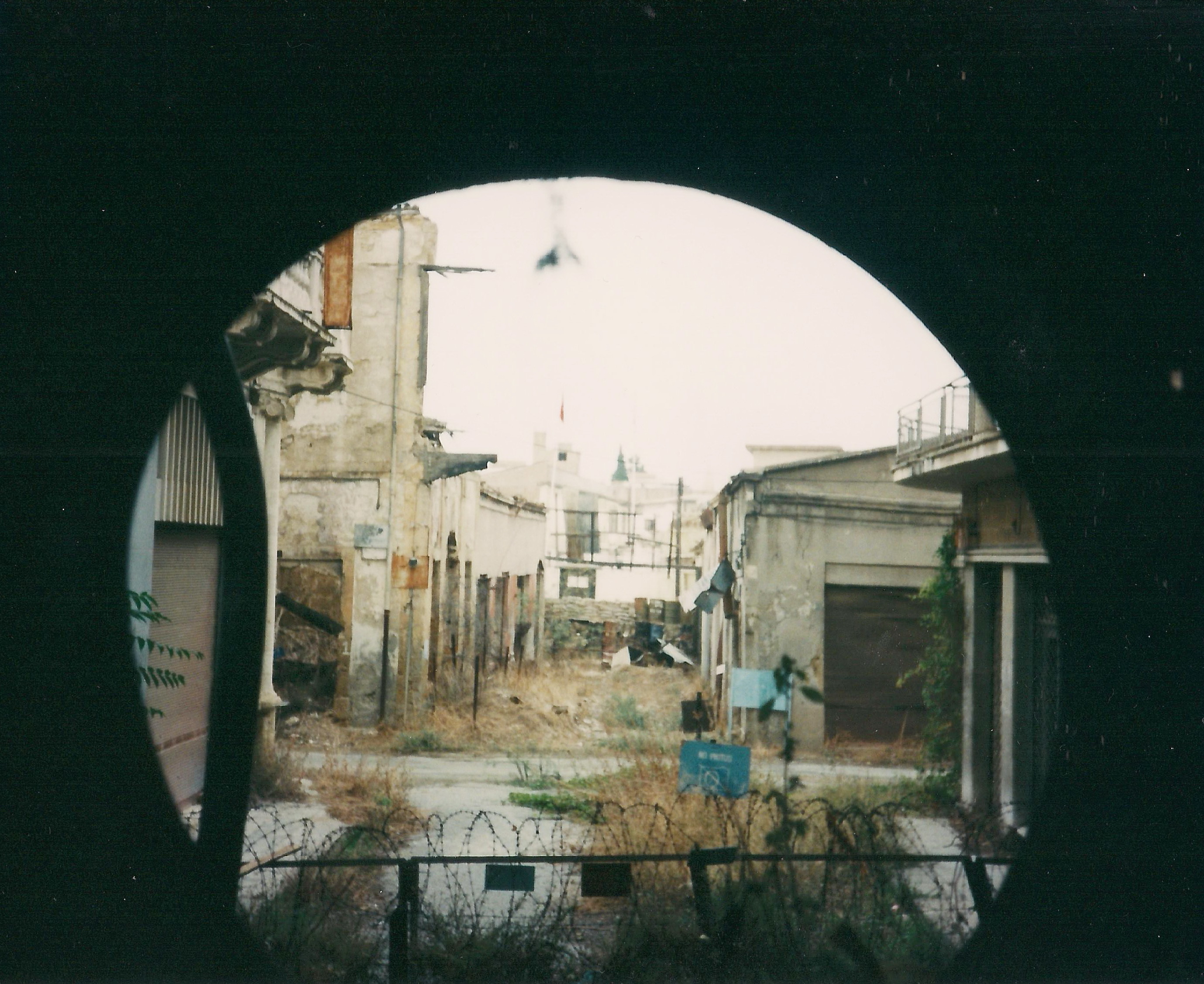
Ledra Street roadblock in 1997.

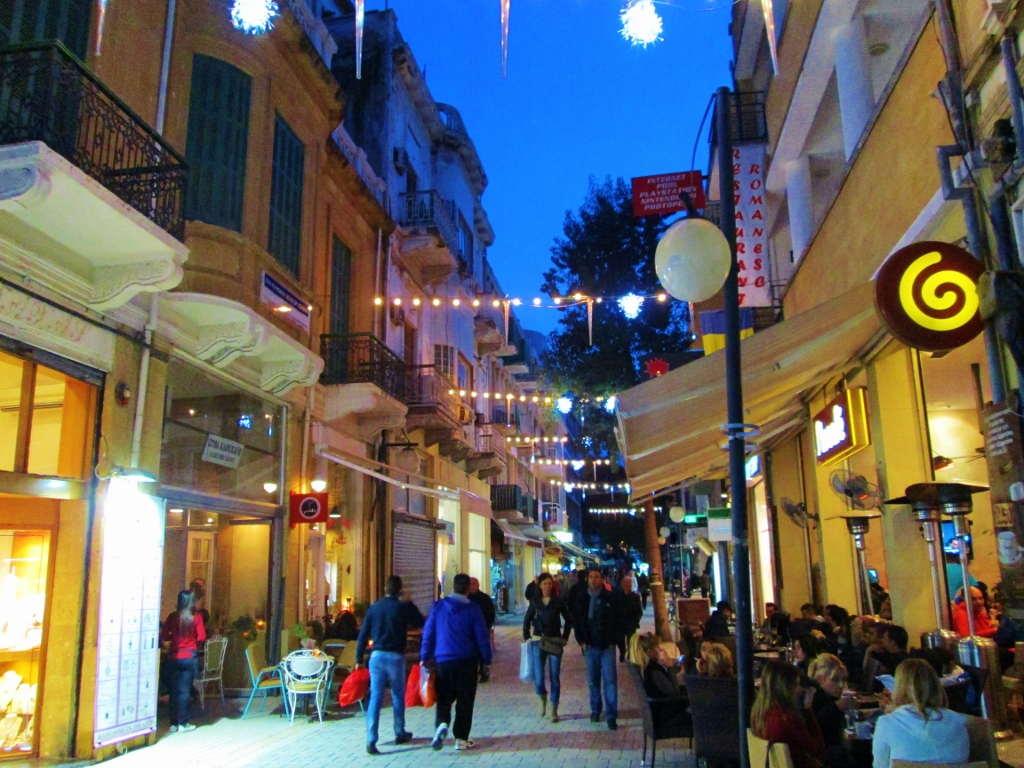
Busy Ledra Street during Christmas

On 8 March 2007, the Greek Cypriot government demolished the wall between the southern portion of Ledra Street and the UN buffer zone and replaced it with 2m-high screens. Then Greek Cypriot president Tassos Papadopoulos said the Cyprus government had unilaterally planned for the dismantling of the Ledra Street wall. He added that with demolition of the wall, his government would consent to the passage being opened if Turkish troops which were present in the area were withdrawn, the derelict buildings on either side of Ledra Street strengthened and Turkish troops allowed UNFICYP to check for landmines. He reiterated that the obstacle to the opening was the presence of the Turkish troops and not the barricade. The move was immediately welcomed by the United Nations and several world leaders.

Dimitris Christofias was elected president of Cyprus on 24 February 2008 on a platform of solving the Cyprus problem. In his first meeting with Turkish Cypriot president Mehmet Ali Talat on 21 March 2008, the two leaders agreed to reopen Ledra Street "as soon as technically possible". The United Nations Development Programme "Partnership for the Future – Mine Action Centre" proceeded to clear the area of mines on 26 March 2008, and work began to shore up the buildings flanking the street to ensure that they will not pose any danger to the users of the crossing.

=== Roadblock reopening after 34 years ===
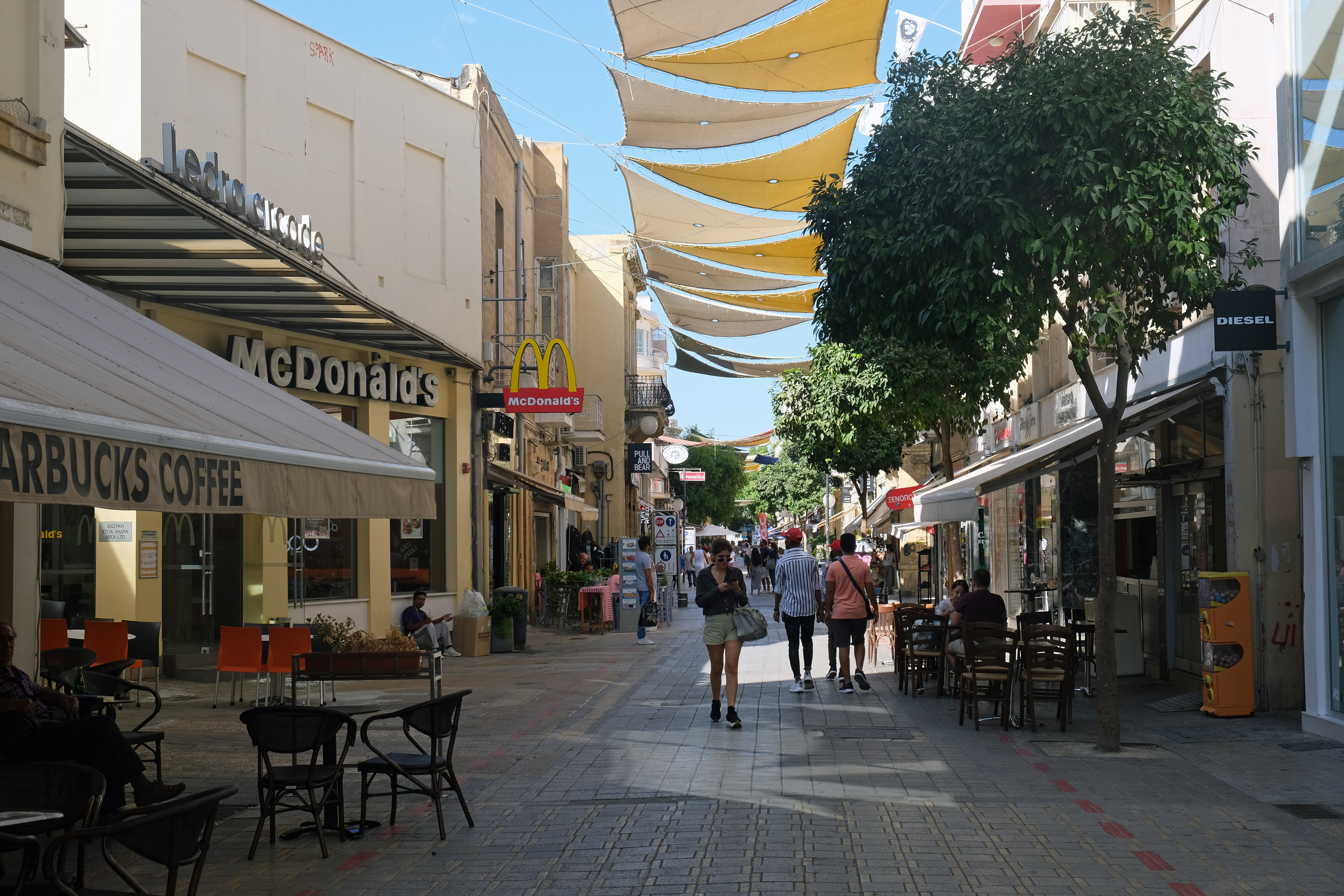
Ledra Street

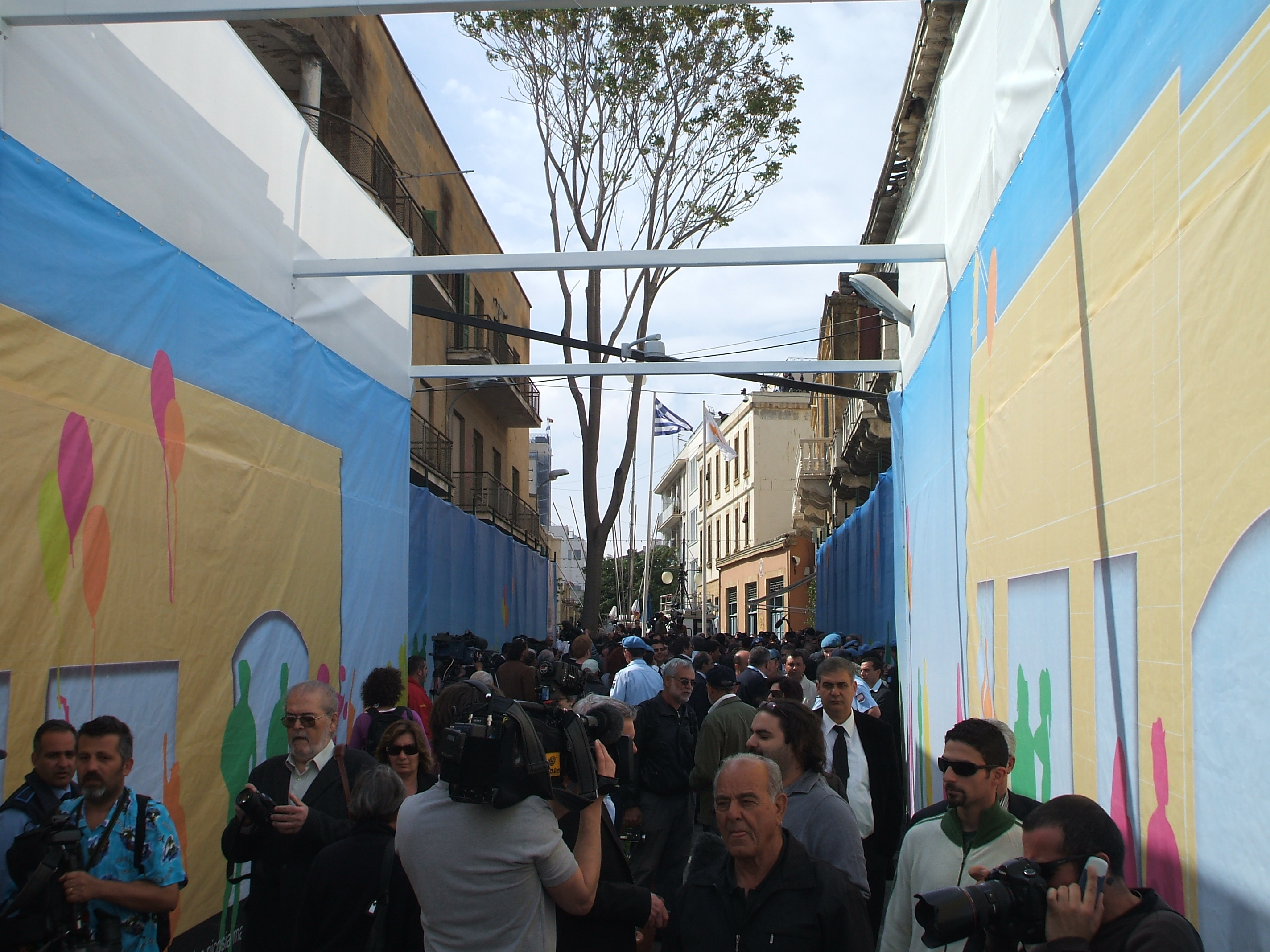
Opening of Ledra Street in April 2008.

On 3 April 2008 at 9 a.m. local time (06:00 UTC), the Ledra Street roadblock crossing through the UN buffer zone was reopened after 34 years, in the presence of Greek and Turkish Cypriot officials who cut a ribbon in Kykkou street, the road between Ledra Street and what is known as Lokmaci point in the Turkish controlled part of Nicosia. Addressing the ceremony, Presidential Commissioner George Iacovou said this day is "an auspicious occasion" as it signals the opening of the fifth crossing point in Cyprus. The International Herald Tribune reported that officials released balloons to mark the event at the end of an opening ceremony. Immediately afterwards, citizens from both sides began using the crossing.

However, later in the day at 9 p.m. local time (18:00 UTC), the Cypriot police closed off the new Ledra Street checkpoint due to a violation of the agreement by the Turkish forces, whose guards penetrated deep into the UN controlled buffer zone. A Cypriot Police source said that two Turkish Guards had refused to leave the buffer zone which was agreed to remain under full UN control. The Cypriot authorities considered the move a breach of the agreement between the Greek Cypriot President and the Turkish Cypriot President and therefore quickly sealed off the checkpoint. After the arrival and mediation of UN officials, Turkish Cypriot forces withdrew back to their ceasefire positions and the crossing was reopened by the Cypriot Police.

Turkish Republic of Northern Cyprus maintains an immigration checkpoint on its side of the crossing and all pedestrians entering and leaving the North have to go through immigration checks. As with all Green Line crossings, Turkish Republic of Northern Cyprus immigration will not place entry and exit stamps on passports but on separate visa slips issued by them. The Republic of Cyprus does not maintain any immigration checkpoint at Ledra Street or any other Green Line crossing. It however conducts identification checks on people entering the South from the North.

=== Elephants for Peace ===
"Elephants for Peace" with a contribution of about 600 objects referring to elephants, such as images or sculptures, succeeded in transforming the frontier line at Ledra Street into a place of festivities for two days on the 9 and 10 May 2009. Rarely has it better been explained than in a letter from Eleni Mavrou, Mayor of Nicosia "…As previously expressed, the Nicosia Municipality sincerely supports and warmly welcomes this creative contribution to dialogue across dividing lines around the world. The idea of representing the desire to cooperate and communicate by means of art is both innovating and appealing. Furthermore, the choice of an elephant as a theme for this artistic initiative is not only appropriate but also insightful. We believe it will resonate with citizens of all ages, on various levels…" Eleni Mavrou, Mayor of Nicosia, 26 March 2010

== Activism ==
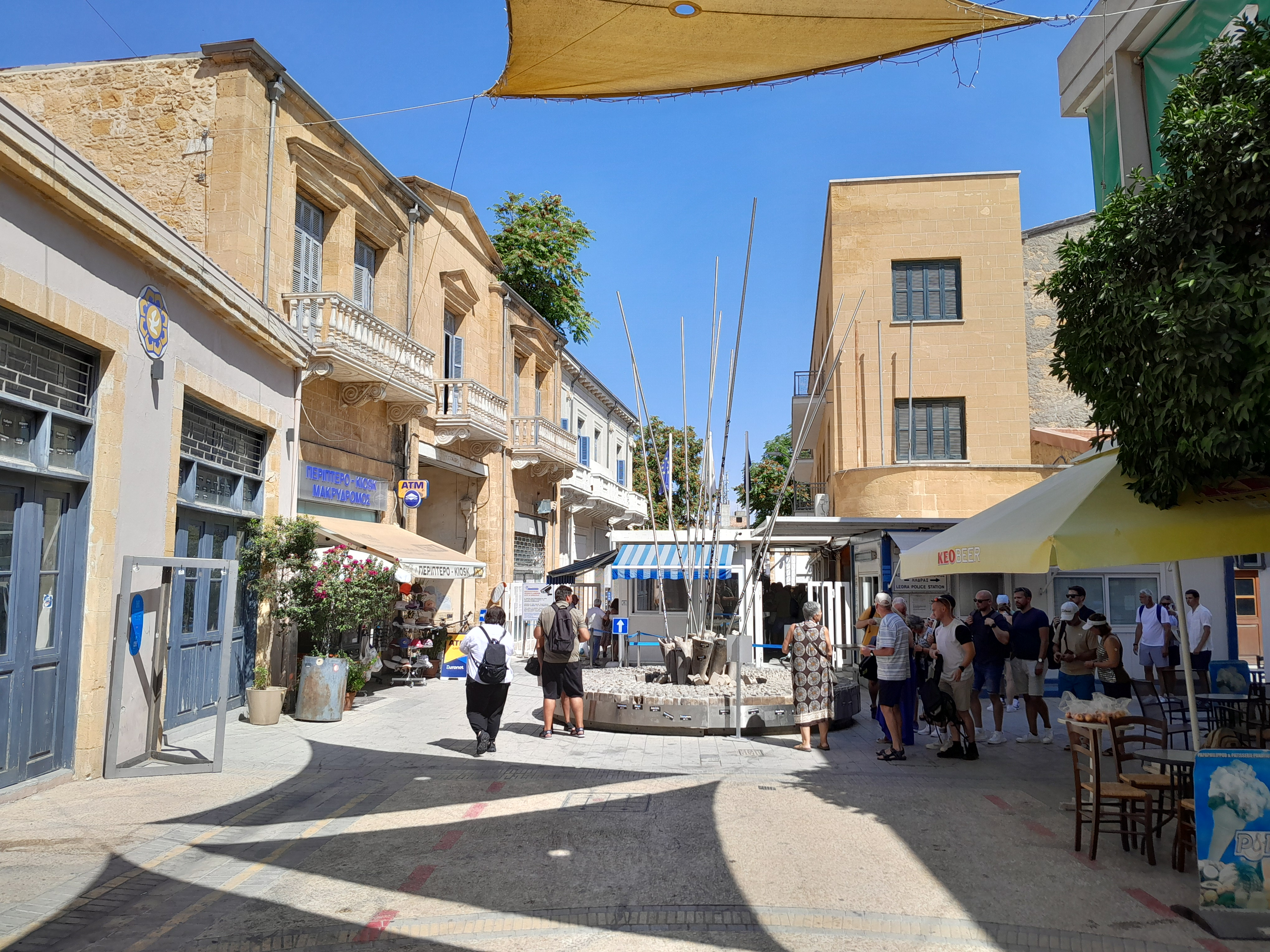
Border crossing in Ledra Street, in September 2025, view from Greek side

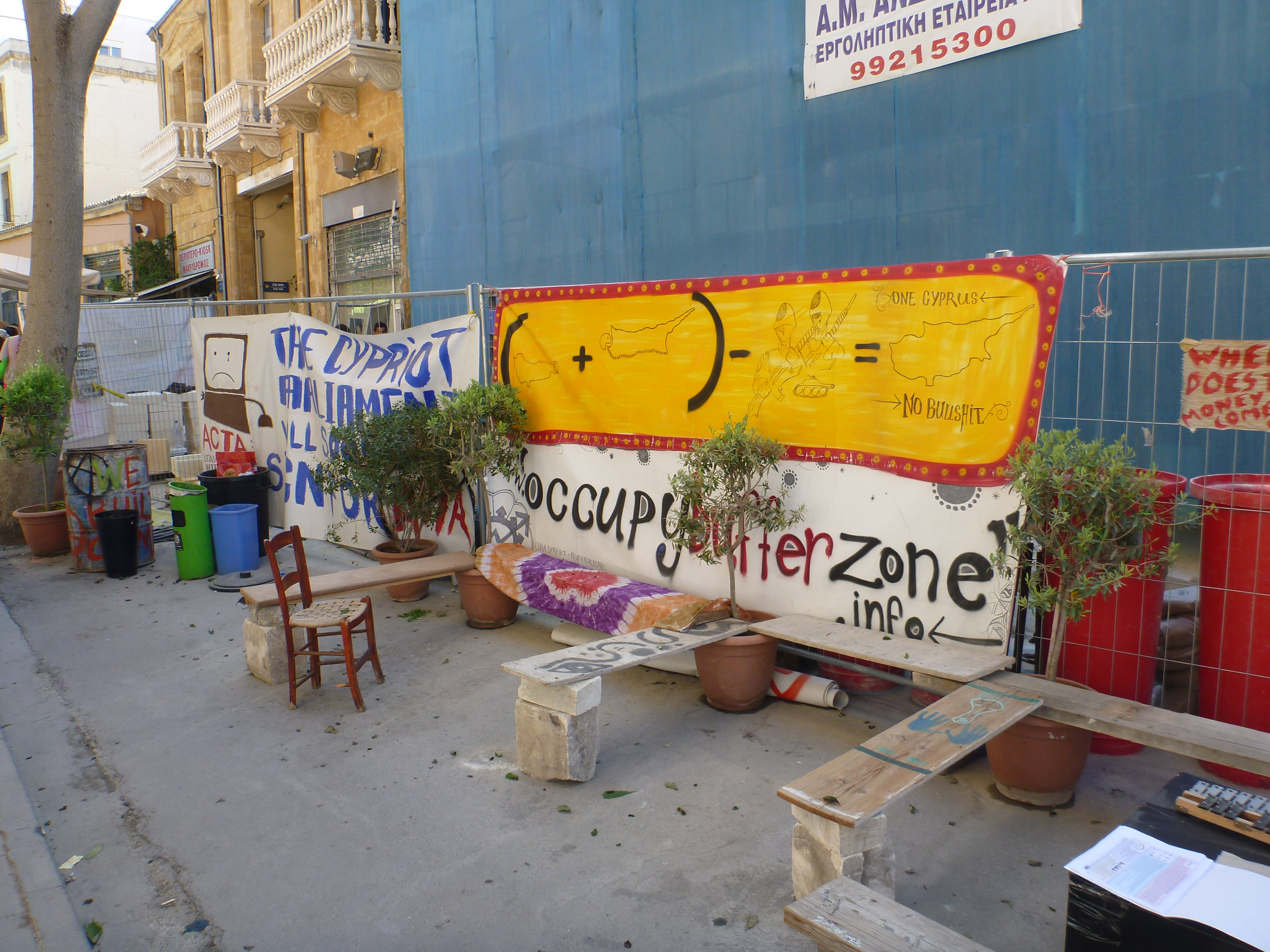
The Occupy Buffer Zone camp in the Ledra Street crossing in Nicosia

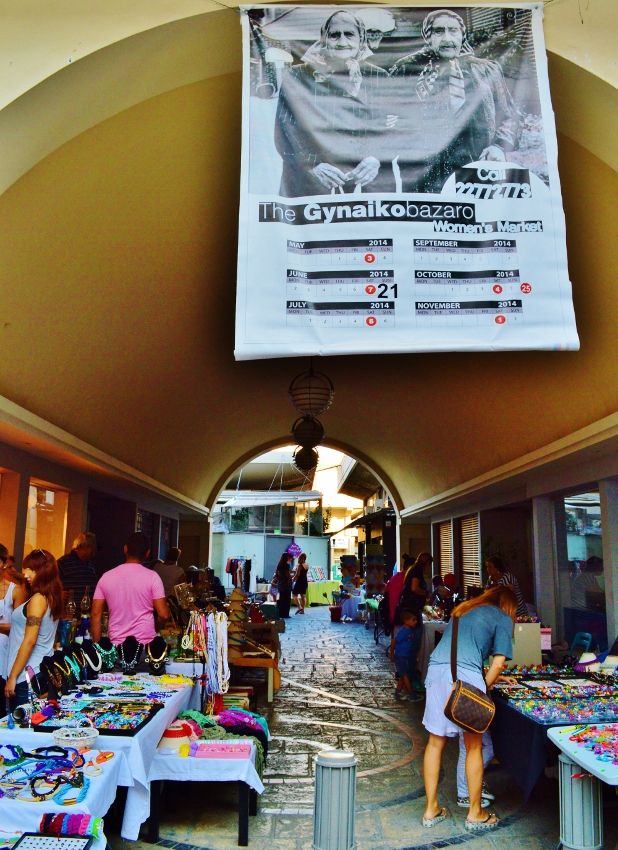
"The Gynaikobazaro" is a market exclusively for women and takes place every Saturday.

The buffer zone between the checkpoints that divide Ledra street was used as a space for activism from 15 October 2011 up until June 2012 by the Occupy Buffer Zone movement.

On 2 September 2014 Greek Cypriot and Turkish Cypriot citizens of Nicosia formed a human chain that stretched from the south part of Ledra Street to the north part of Ledra Street and through the UN checkpoint as a symbol of peace and unification.

On 26 April 2011 anti-nuclear protesters formed a bi-communal human chain to express their concern and fear over radiation leaks from a planned nuclear power plant in Akkuyu, Turkey. Protesters were also commemorating the anniversary of the Chernobyl nuclear reactor accident. The human chain was joined by The Progressive Party of the Working People (AKEL), New Cyprus Party (YKP), United Cyprus Party (BKP), Cyprus Green Party, EDON, KTÖS, KTOEÖS, KTAMS, DAÜ-BIR-SEN, BES, ÇAG-SEN, Turkish Cypriot Association for Democracy (UK), T/C The Chamber of Electrical Engineers (EMO), T/C Chamber of Industrial Engineers (ENMO), T/C Chamber of Mechanical Engineers (MMO), T/C Chamber of Environmental Engineers (ÇMO), Friends of Nature, and Green Action Group (Yesil Baris Hareketi).

== Economy ==
There are a large variety of shops on Ledra Street, ranging from department stores selling luxury goods to small specialty shops selling arts and crafts. Ledra Street hosts the former tallest building in Nicosia, the Shacolas Tower, and is linked to three arcades that include shops and cafes. Dozens of firms from the international market are located on Ledra Street.

== See also ==
- Cyprus dispute
- Cypriot intercommunal violence
- Dereboyu Avenue
- Rigenis Street
- Laiki Geitonia
- Zahra Street
