= Ledra =

Ancient city-kingdom of Cyprus

- Λήδρα (Ancient Greek)
- Ancient city-Kingdoms of Cyprus

- Location within Cyprus
- 35°09′45″N 33°21′45″E
- Location: Cyprus
- Region: Nicosia District

Ledra (Greek: Λήδρα), also spelt Ledrae, was an ancient city-kingdom in the centre of Cyprus where the capital city of Nicosia is today.

Ledra was established in 1050 BC. It had become a city-kingdom by the seventh century BC. At times, it had been subject to Assyrian rule. Ledra was one of ten Cypriot kingdoms listed on the prism (many-sided tablet) of the Assyrian king Esarhaddon (680–669 BC). The only known king of Ledra is Onasagoras, mentioned in this tablet for paying tribute to Esarhaddon.

By Hellenistic times (330 BC) it had dwindled to a small village. An account suggested that it lost its city-kingdom status because it consolidated with other such kingdoms to form stronger territorial units. In 280 BC, Ledra became Leukotheon while the Byzantines started referring to it as Lefkon or "poplar grove". During the fourth century AD, it became a bishopric and was renamed Lefkosia. It eventually became the capital of Nicosia under this name during the 10th century.

Ledra Street in Nicosia is named after Ledra.

The probable site of the city is now curated as the Ledron Archaeological Local Museum.
