= Nicosia Municipality =

Municipal government of Greek Nicosia

Nicosia Municipality Δήμος Λευκωσίας (Greek) Lefkoşa Belediyesi (Turkish)
- Municipality
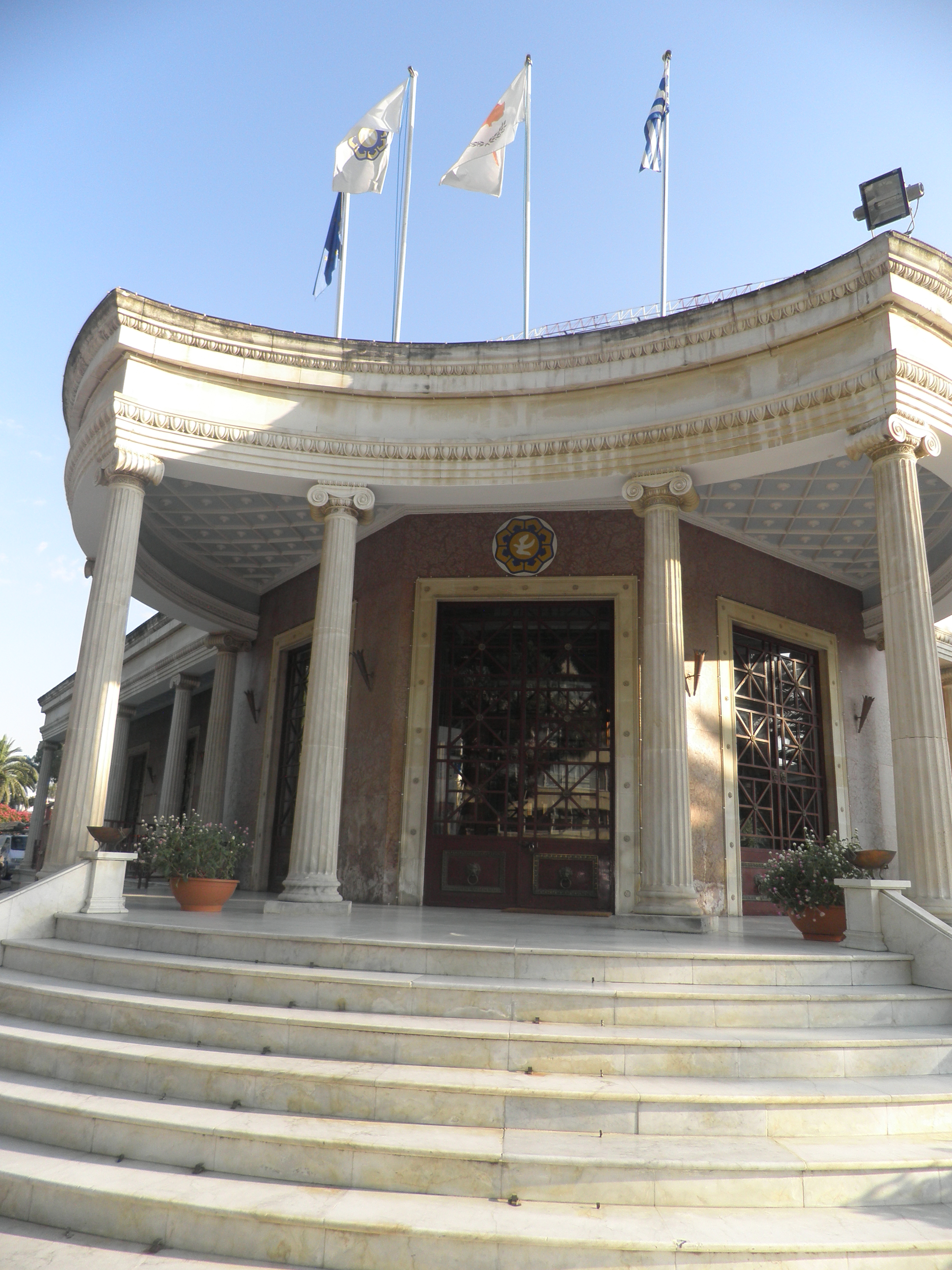
- Old Municipal Building, Eleftheria Square

- Flag Coat of arms

- Location within Cyprus Location within the Eastern Mediterranean Location within the European Union Location within Asia
- Coordinates: 35°10′21″N 33°21′54″E
- Country: Republic of Cyprus
- District: Nicosia District

Government
  - Mayor: Charalambos Prountzos (Ind.)

Area
  - Municipality: 20.08 km^{2} (7.75 sq mi)
- (Note: The former area of the municipality, before the merger.)
- Elevation: 220 m (720 ft)

Population (2021)
  - Municipality: 111,797
  - Rank: 1st municipality in Nicosia, 2nd municipality in Cyprus
- Demonym: Nicosian
- Time zone: UTC+2 (EET)
  - Summer (DST): UTC+3 (EEST)
- Area code: 22
- Website: www.nicosia.org.cy

Nicosia Municipality (Greek: Δήμος Λευκωσίας, Dimos Lefkosias; Turkish: Lefkoşa Belediyesi) is the municipal government which is responsible for all the municipal duties of Nicosia.

== History ==
The municipal council was elected according to the Municipal Ordinance of 1882, and the District Commissioner with one Greek and one Turkish adviser undertook municipal affairs since November 1884.

In 1930, the municipal legislation which made the new corporations liable to government audit, was enacted. However, after the 1931 uprising, the municipal councils were supplemented by government appointees. The municipal elections introduced again in 1943.

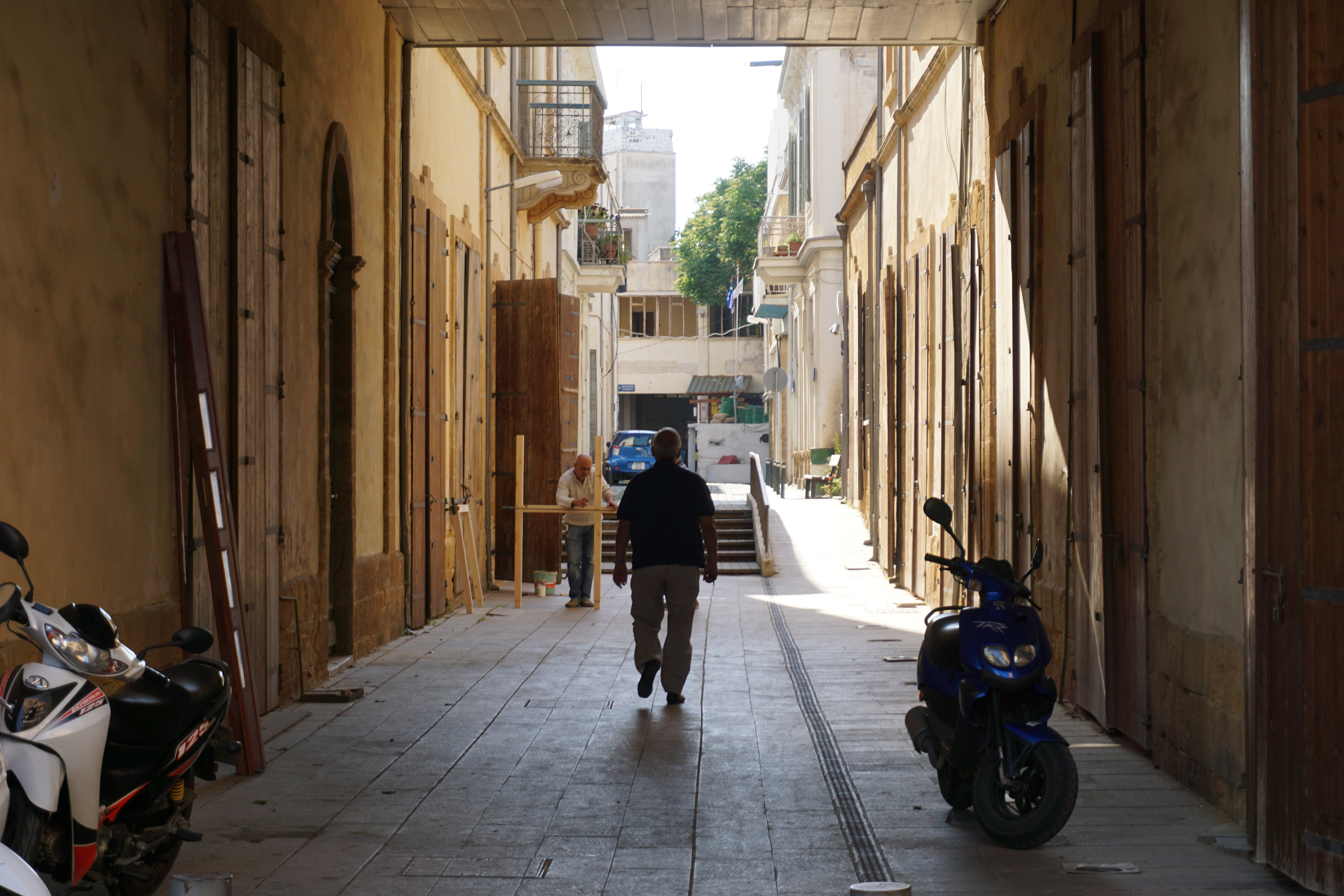
Street in Nicosia close to the buffer zone

== Office ==
The first municipal office was at Chariklia Argirides in Nea Agora area. In 1897 the municipal offices moved to the house of Efrosini Tarsi at the Ledra Street, then moved to a place where it became called Municipality Square, then temporarily moved to a building in the cabaret of Luna Park on the Bastion Davila, overlooking Eleftheria Square in 1944.

== Gallery ==
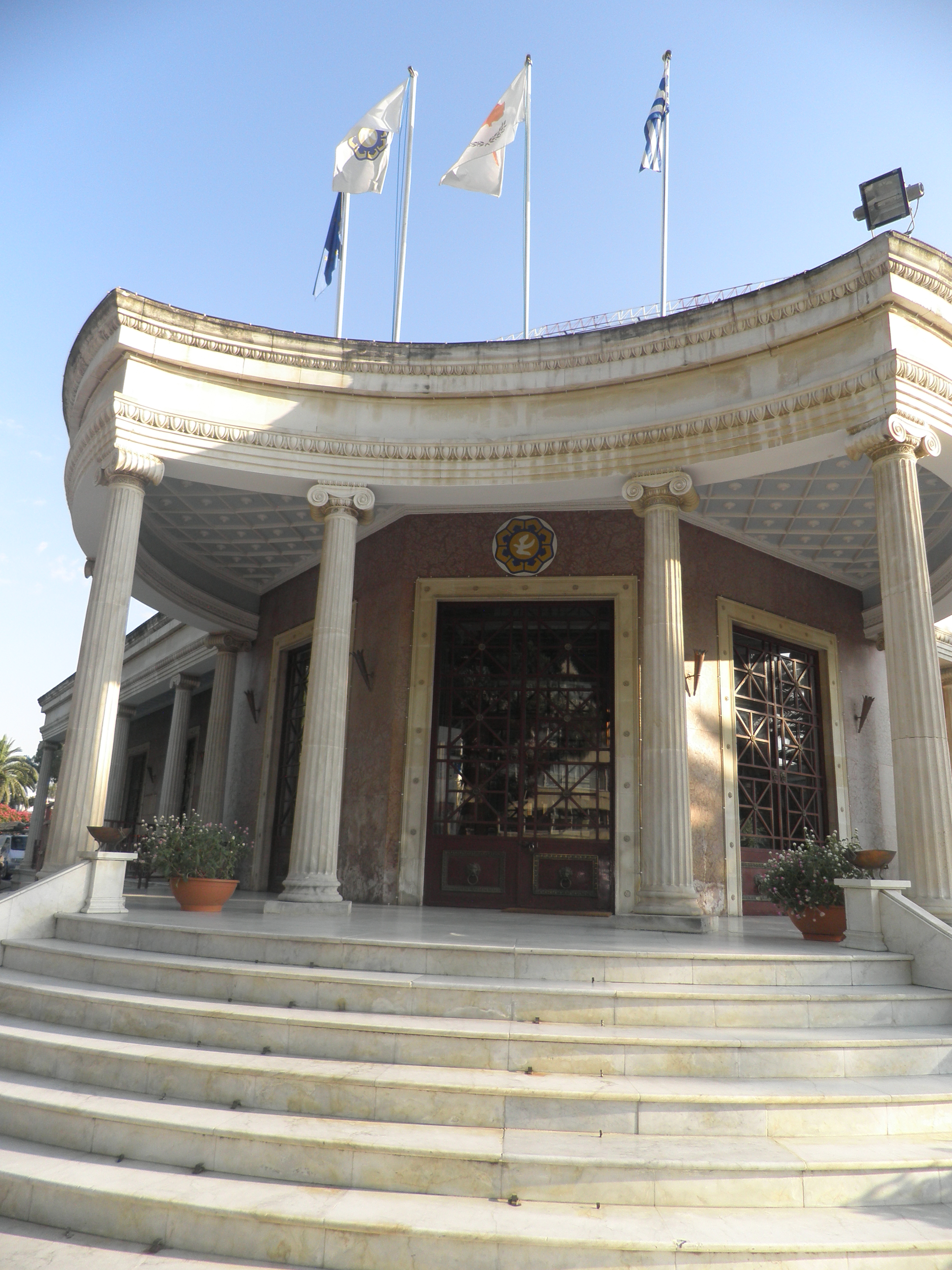
Old Town Hall façade

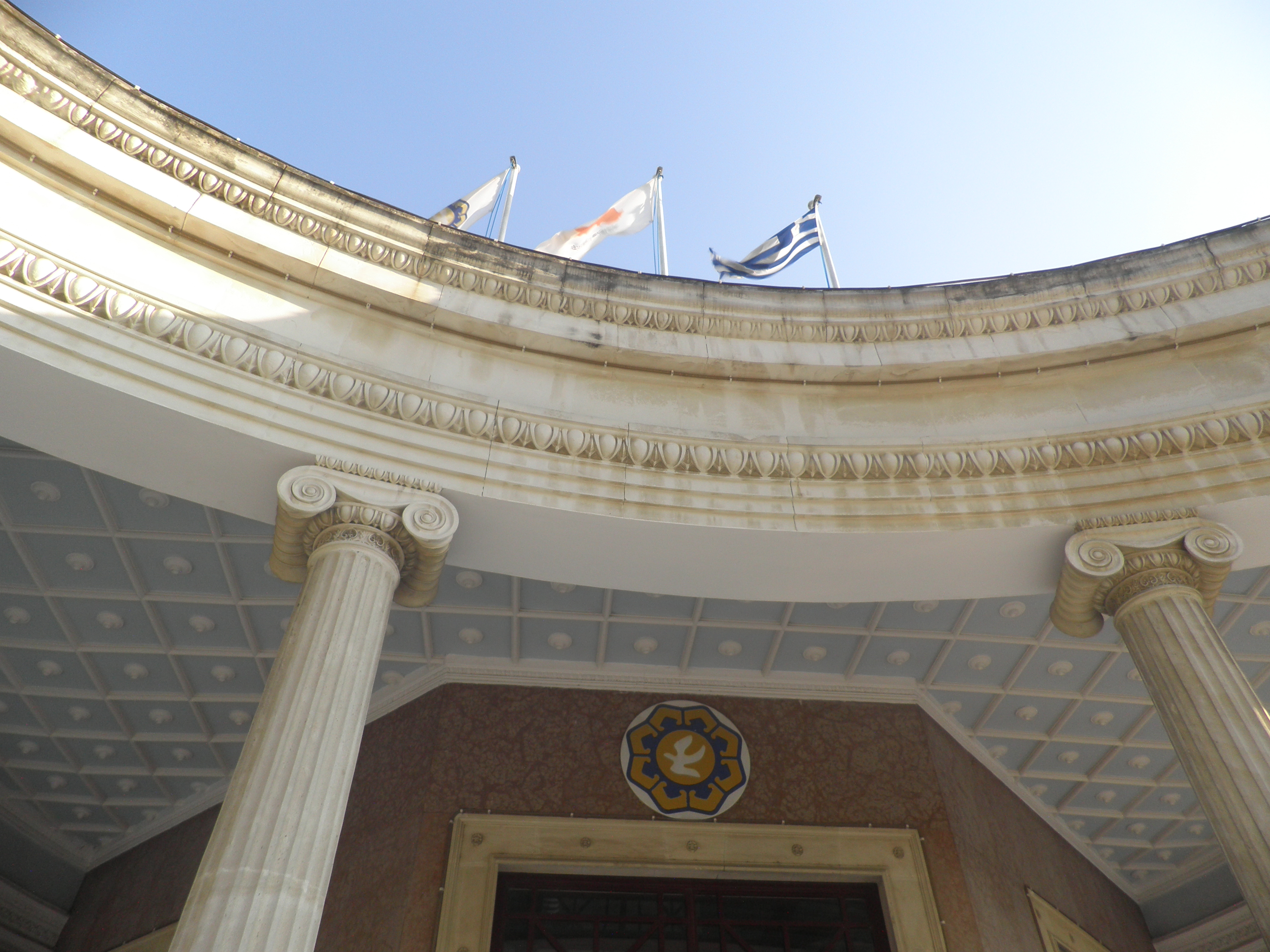
Old Town Hall Building (detail)

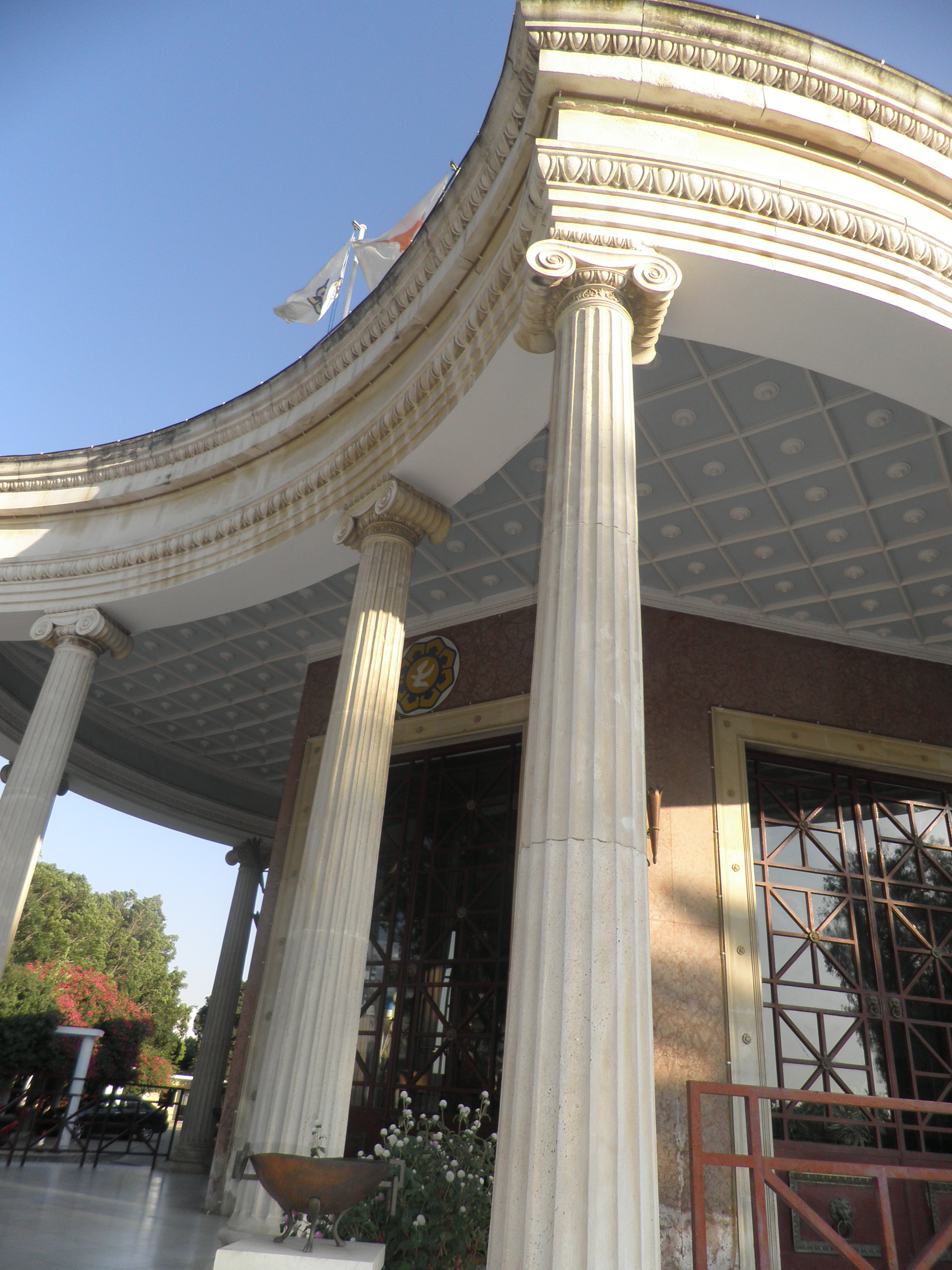
Old Town Hall (detail)

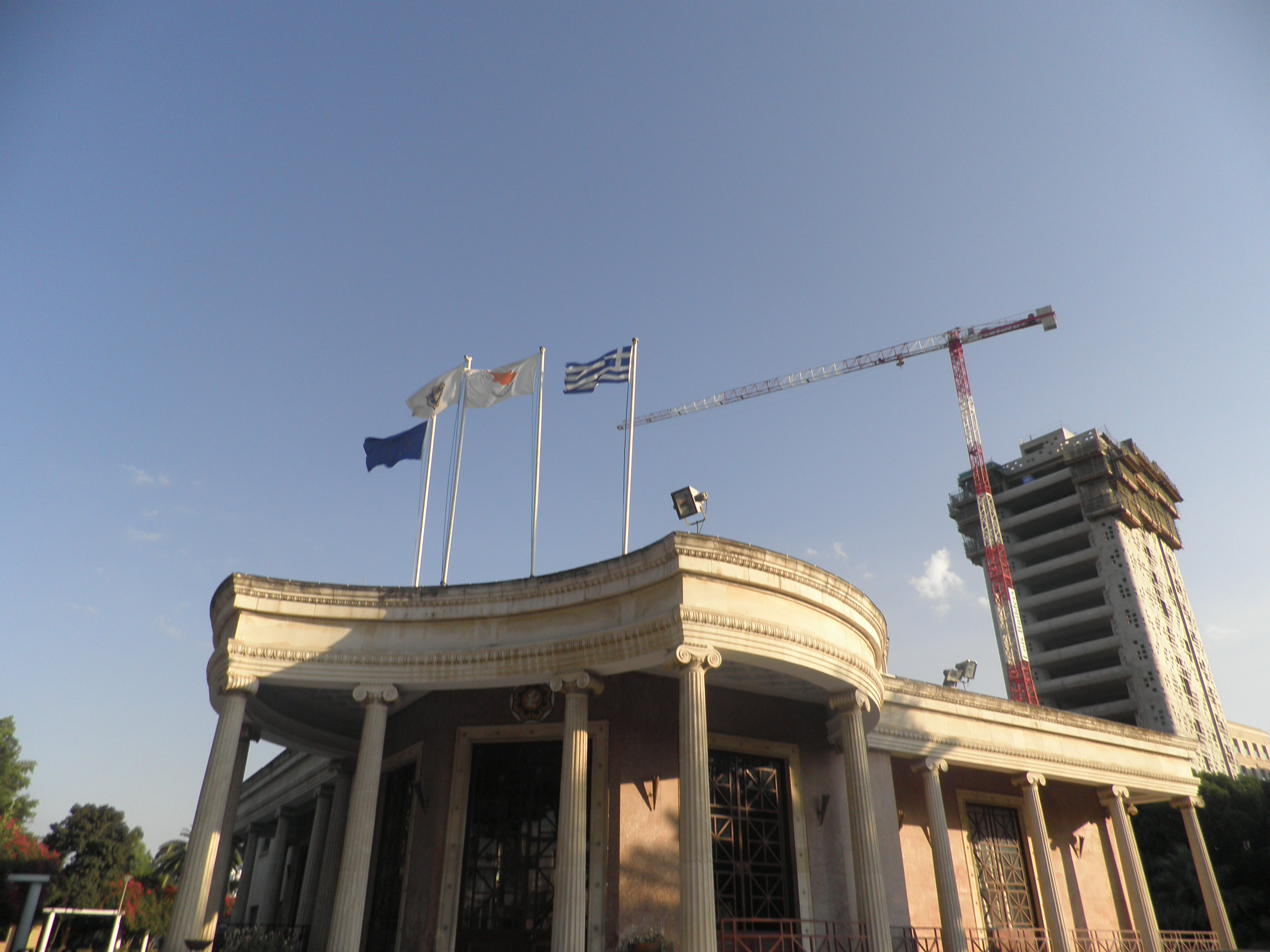
Old Town Hall with Tower 25 in the background during 2011

== Mayors (1959–present) ==
- Diomedes Skettos, 1959–1960
- George M. Spanos, 1960–1964
- Odysseas Ioannides, 1964–1970
- Lellos Demetriades, 1971–1974
- Christoforos Kithreotis, August 1974
- Lellos Demetriades, October 1974 – 2001
- Michael Zampelas, 2002–2006
- Eleni Mavrou, 2007–2011
- Constantinos Yiorkadjis, 2012–2024
- Charalambos Prountzos, 2024–

== See also ==
- Nicosia Turkish Municipality
