= Onasagorou Street =

Street in Nicosia, Cyprus

Coordinates: 35°10′20.9″N 33°21′44.8″E

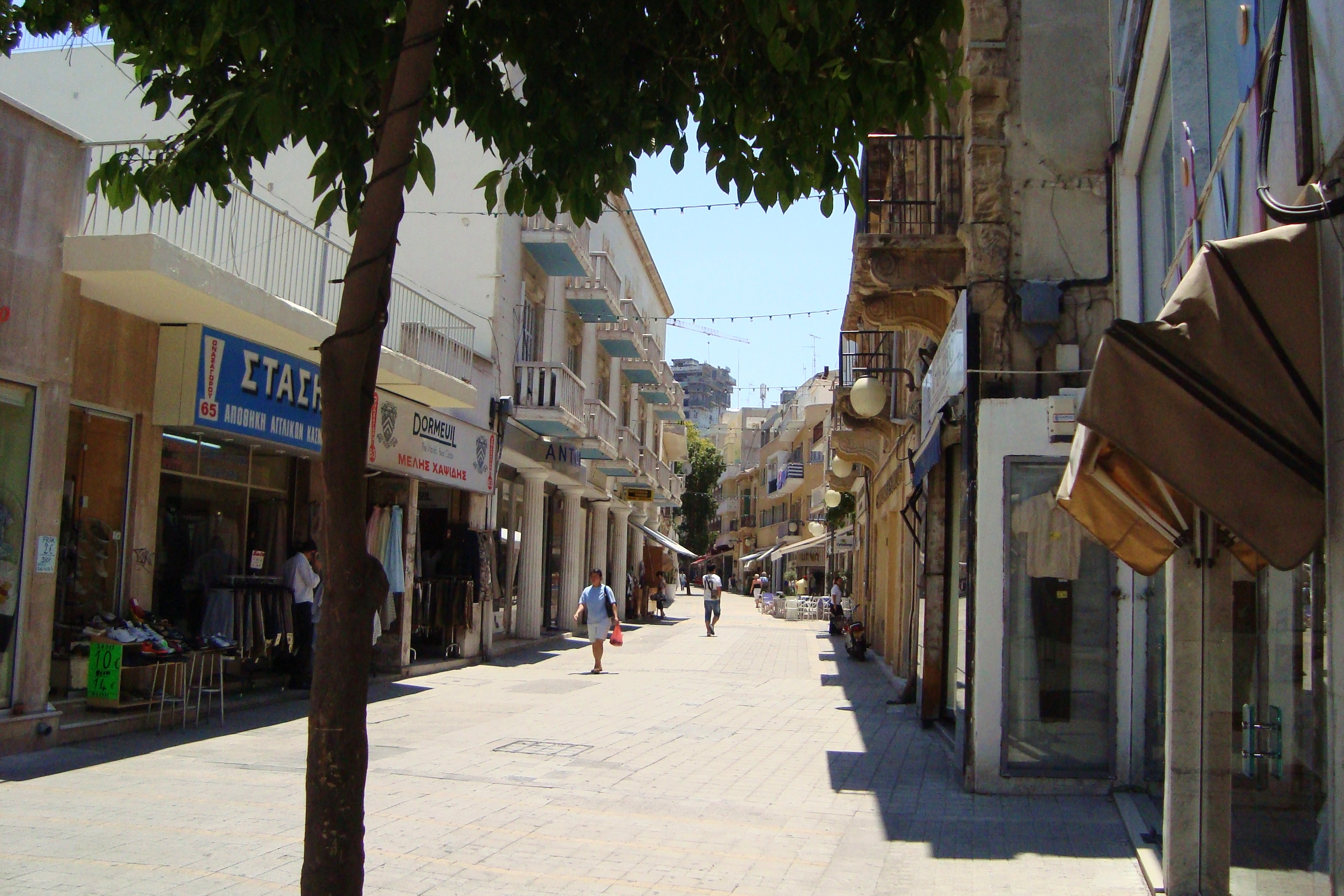
Onasagorou street during daytime

Onasagorou Street is a major shopping street in central Nicosia that runs from Eleftheria square to Faneromeni School. It has been a fashionable shopping street since the 19th century and is currently the home of many high-priced fashion shops. It is currently one of the most expensive strips of real estate in Europe. Base of British Council in Cyprus is located in Onasagorou Street. Onasagorou Street is 0.3 km long.

== History ==
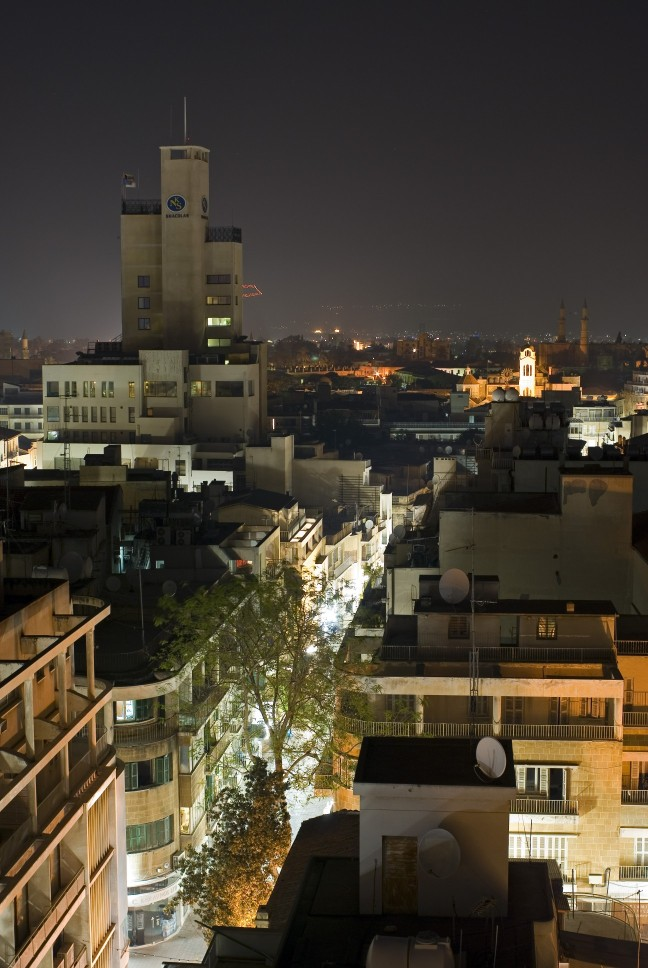
Onasagorou Street by night.

Onasagorou Street was the location of the most rich Cypriot houses during 19th and early 20th century. During the late 20th century the street became abandoned due to the prosperity of Ledra Street which was becoming more popular, and hosting more businesses.

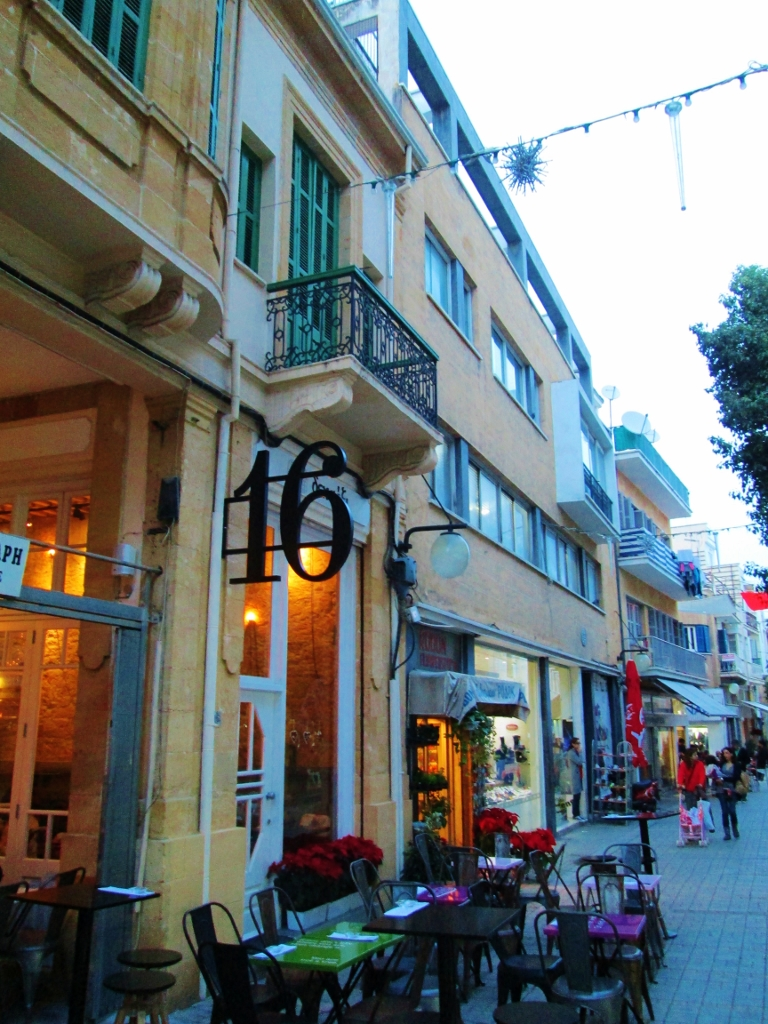
Typical cafeteria in Onasagorou street.
