= Rigenis Street =

Road in Nicosia, Cyprus

Coordinates: 35°10′22″N 33°21′27″E

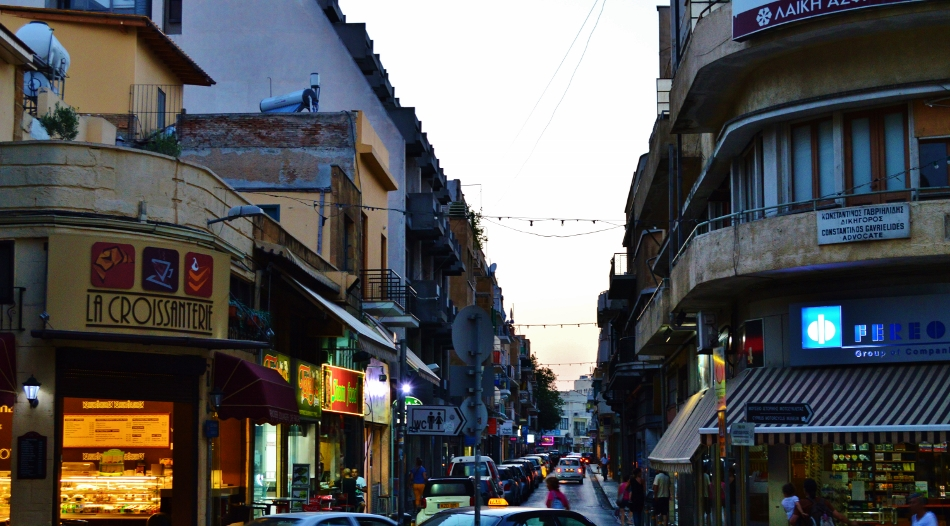
Rigenis Street during sunset

Rigenis Street (Greek: οδός Ρηγαίνης· Rigainis Street) is a shopping street in central Nicosia that runs from Ledra Street to Solomos Square. It was the busiest street in Nicosia during the British Colonial period in Cyprus after Hermes Street and Ledra Street. Rigenis Street is 0.3 km long. One publication stated that "mention of 'Rigenis Street' does not call into mind the glorious queen who used to rule Cyprus but rather the cabaret joints for which it is notorious".

== Landmarks ==
At 70 Rigenis Street is the Japanese restaurant Bonsa, and at 94 Rigenis Street is The Classic Hotel, a boutique hotel.
