= Eleftheria square =

Main square in Nicosia, Cyprus

Coordinates: 35.170°N 33.360°E

Liberty Square
- Eleftheria Square
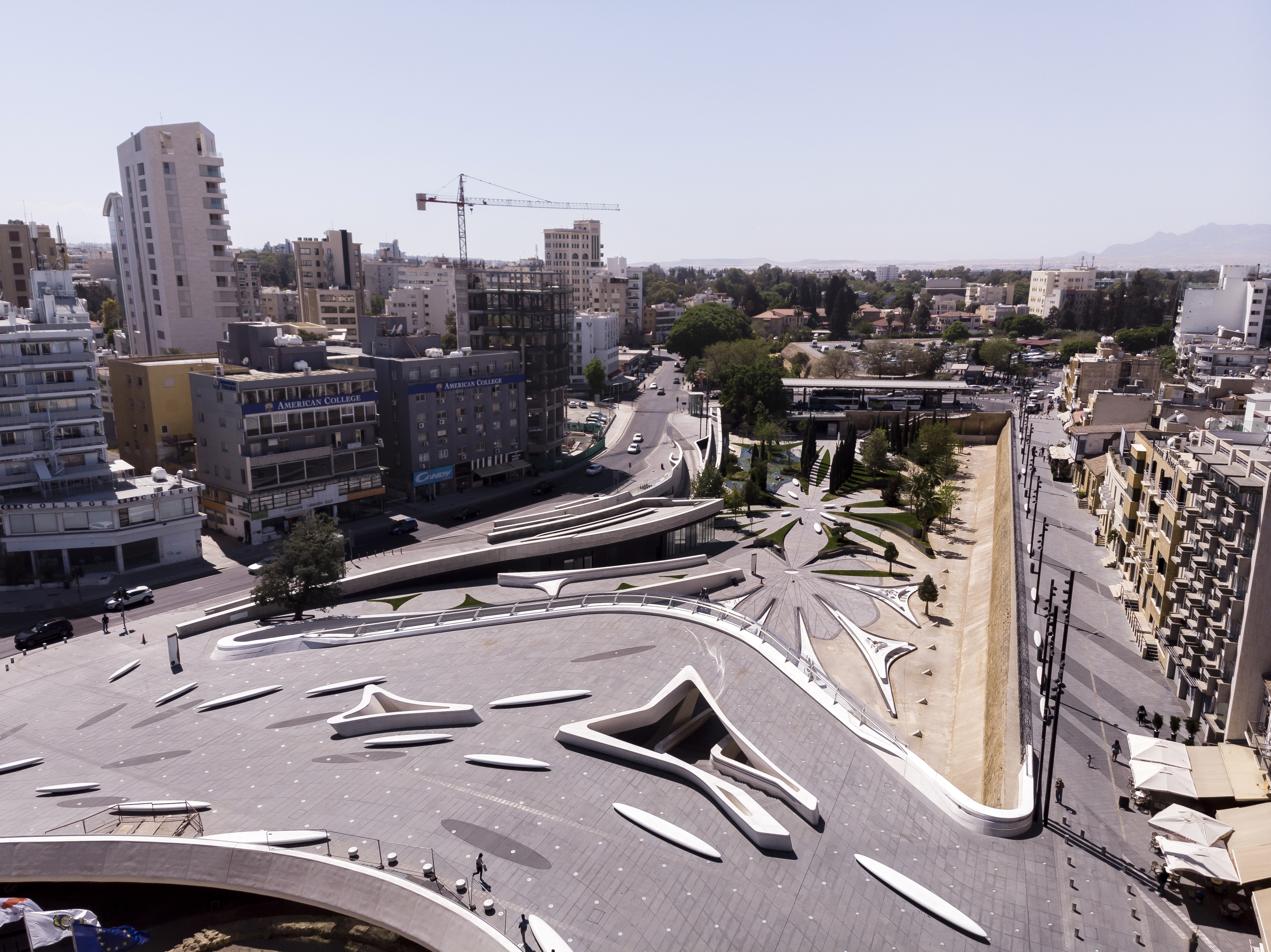

General information
- Type: Public, historical
- Location: Nicosia, Cyprus
- Completed: December 2018 (Upper Bridge) January 2021 (Fully)
- Owner: City of Nicosia, CY-EU

Design and construction
- Architecture firm: Zaha Hadid Architects (ZHA)

Renovating team
- Architect(s): Zaha Hadid, Christos Passas

Eleftheria Square (Greek: Πλατεία Ελευθερίας; Turkish: Eleftheria Meydanı, Özgürlük Meydanı); literally meaning Liberty Square, is the main square in central Nicosia, the capital city of Cyprus. It forms the intersection of Ledra and Onasagorou streets with Stasinou, Omirou, Kostaki Pantelidi, Konstandinou Palaiologou and Evagorou avenues. It is considered one of Zaha Hadid's Top 35 projects.

== Overview ==
The name translates as Liberty Square in English. Previously the square was called Metaxas Square, in reference to the Greek statesman Ioannis Metaxas. It was renamed in 1974, following a competition held at the suggestion of the then Mayor of Nicosia. It is located in the centre of the town below the Venetian walls of the medieval city. Nicosia town hall, located on D’Avila bastion, overlooks the square whilst Ledra Street leads onto its northern side. The project involves the use of sophisticated custom made materials and concepts.

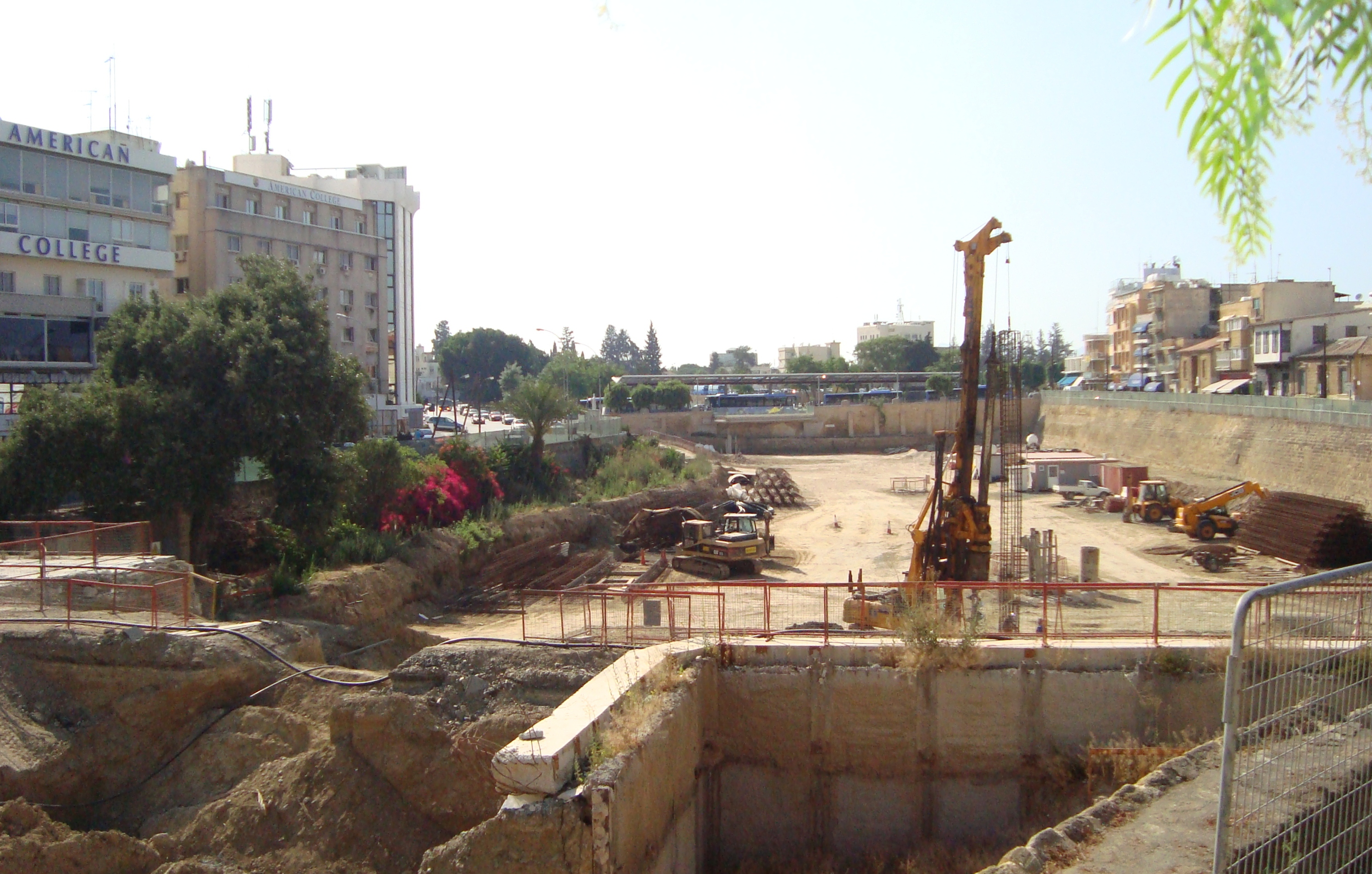
Renovation and remodeling of Eleftheria Square Nicosia Republic of Cyprus

== Cultural importance ==
The square is usually the focus of various profile activities in the capital. Examples include advertising promotions, political rallies and meetings such as the first meeting of the Occupy Buffer Zone movement on October 15, 2011, and sporting events. Celebrations such as Cyprus's accession to the European Union were also centered around the square. As presently the square is not pedestrianized, when major events take place vehicles are redirected.

== Modern era ==
Liberty Square was not part of the original construction of the Venetian walls. It first took the form of a bridge constructed during the British Cyprus era when the island was under the dominion of the British Empire, at the end of the 19th century. As the city expanded out of the medieval walls wooden bridges were constructed to facilitate transport. The original wooden bridge known as the Hajisavvas Opening (erected in 1882) was replaced with a solid concrete one, which survives to date. In the first triangulated survey of Cyprus conducted by Horacio Herbert Kitchener of the British Empire, the opening leading to up to the current Eleftheria Square was noted down as Limassol Gate, despite it not being one of the 3 original gates of the Walled City.

== Renovation project ==
In 2005 an architectural competition was announced to redesign the historical square. This was won by a group led by Zaha Hadid and Christos Passas.

"Eleftheria Square constitutes a dramatic and historically significant 'architectural' intervention - an aspiration to reconnect the ancient city's massive fortified Venetian Walls and moat with the modern city and beyond - a bold vision of coherence and continuity which can become a catalyst to unify the last divided capital of Europe." Zaha Hadid Architects

In 2005, an international architectural competition was announced for the redesign of the square in which 35 offices from different countries submitted proposals.[1][5] The winners were a team led by Zaha Hadid and Christos Passas. The reasoning behind the project was presented at various events both in Cyprus and in London, where a special exhibition was held to present the idea at the Hellenic Center in London, under the artistic supervision of the co-creator of the project, Christos Passas. The proposed plans were strongly criticized by some local architects who mainly deal with the preservation of monuments.[6] In 2009, at the instigation of the Architects, the initial excavations revealed archaeological finds that brought about modifications to the original design. In February 2012, renovation works began. The project was completed with a delay of more than 2 years and was given to the public in stages and in progress on June 11, 2021. The construction lasted 6 years. The technical difficulties during the construction, but also the improvement interventions in the infrastructure of the city center, were something that had upset the local community and caused a lot of complaints and dissatisfaction, mainly due to traffic obstruction.

== Criticism ==
The proposed plans have been criticized by some local designers. In 2009 the initial excavation works revealed archaeological findings that have forced alterations to the original design.

Some conflicting opinions have also been expressed about the aesthetics and functionality of the project. Some of the criticisms the project has received are for the choice of trees planted, which are mostly pyramidal cypresses that do not provide enough shade, etc. The project is admittedly a progressive approach to the creation of public space, and in fact many of the criticisms may have been due to a misinterpretation of the design intent. The project has been described as a model Cypriot garden with the synthesis of archaeological, ecological and architectural elements in a single whole. The project has received many awards for the overall design approach and the positive impact it has on the urban center of Nicosia. In November 2022, the project and the co-creator of the project, Christos Passas, who undertook the completion of the work after the death of Zaha Hadid, shared the 1st place State Architecture Award in the Remarkable Architectural Project Category.

== Gallery ==
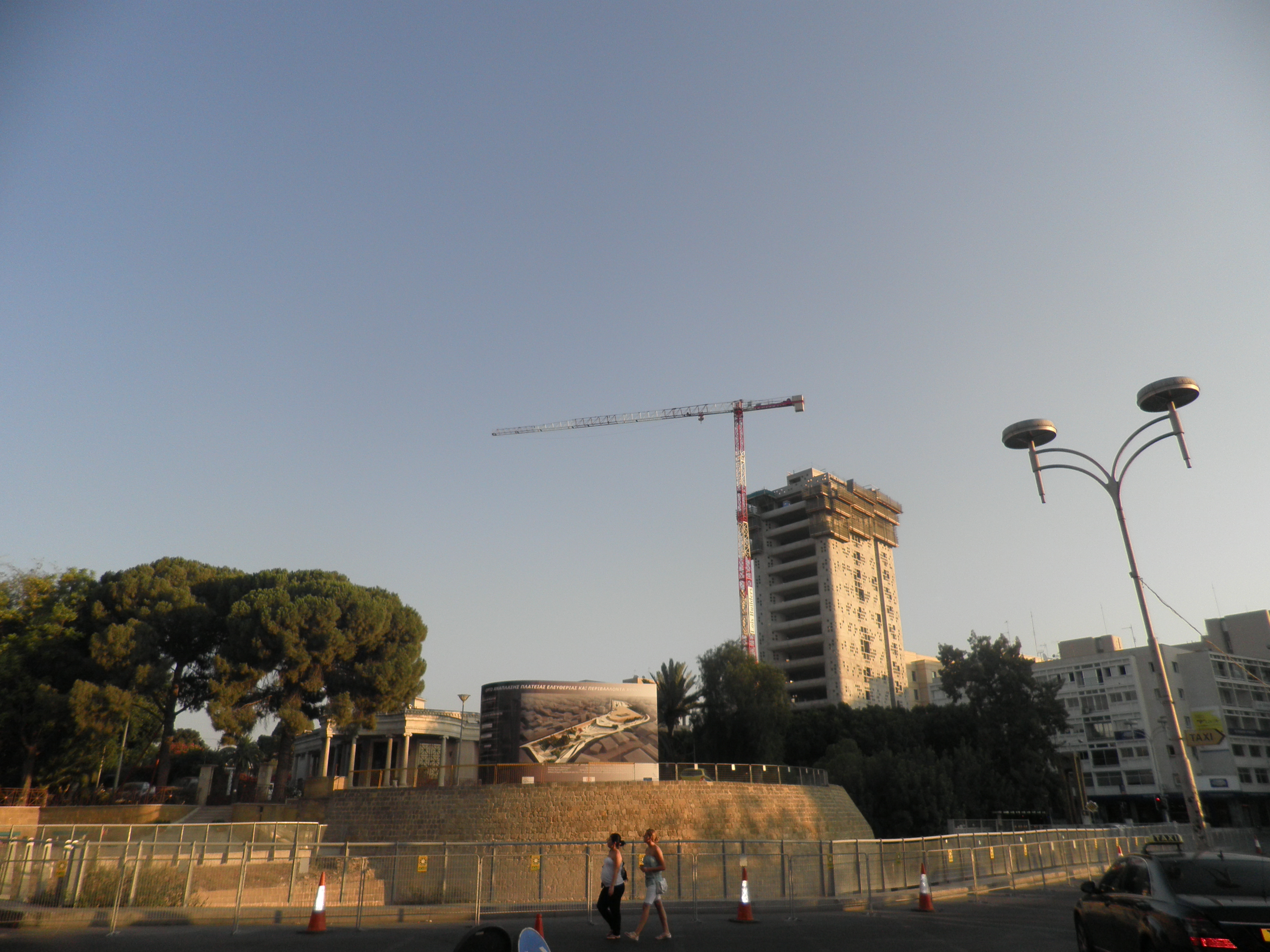
Town Hall, Venetian walls and Tower 25

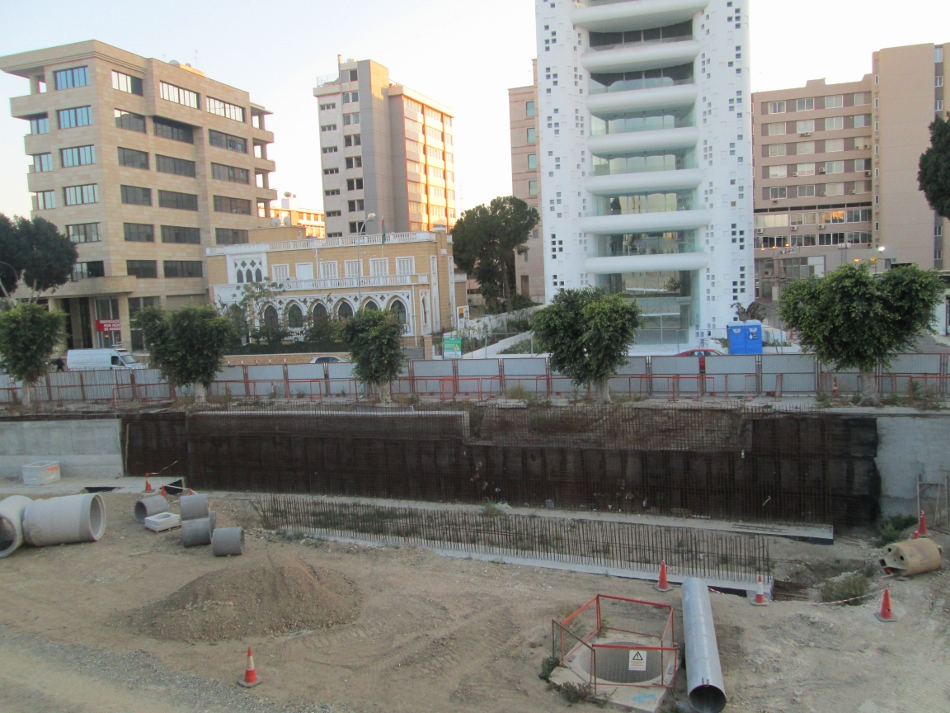
Liberty Square under construction

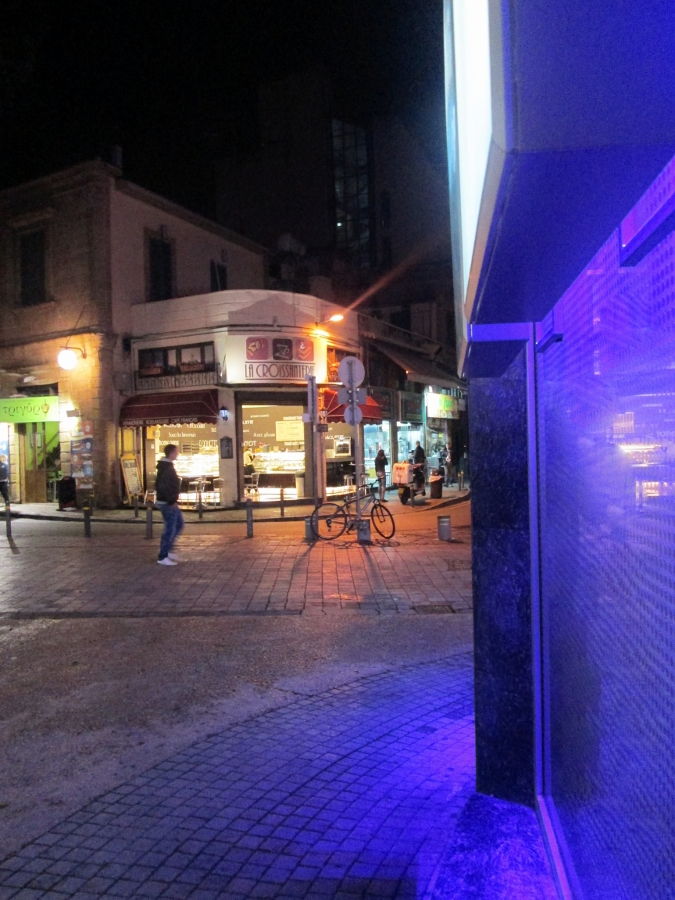
View towards Ledra Street

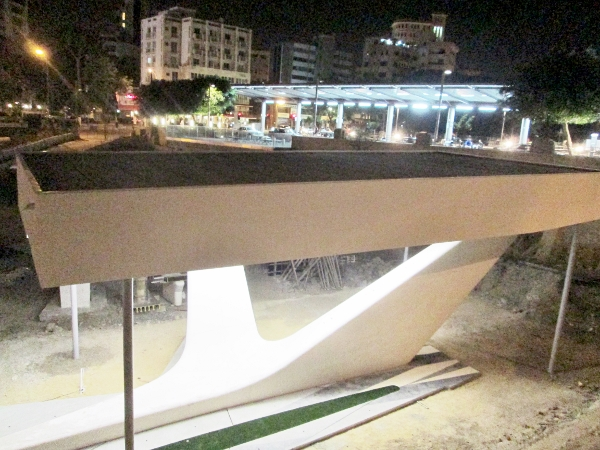
Eleftheria Square under construction at night

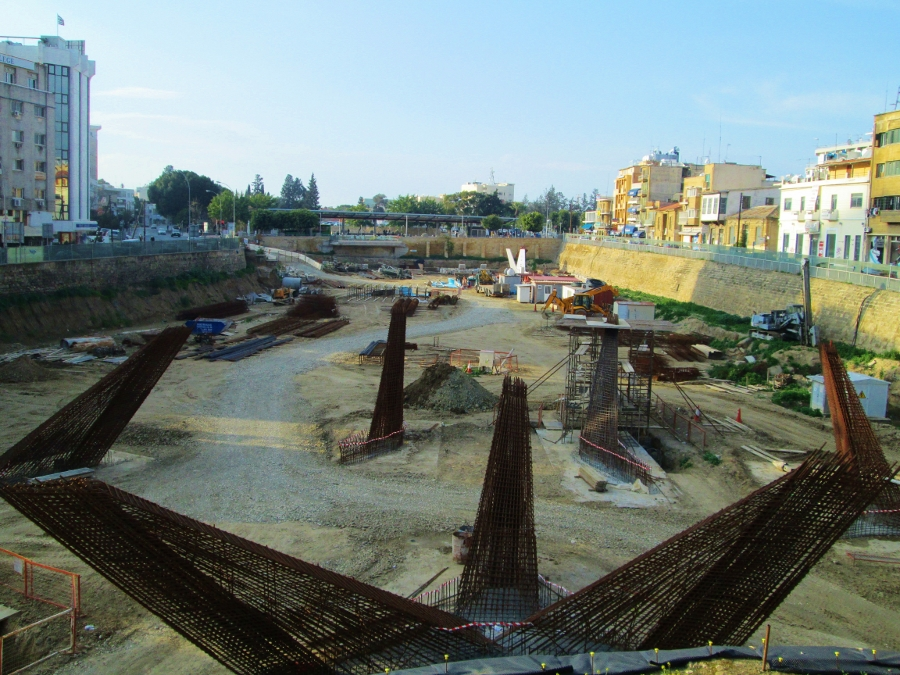
Eleftheria Square under construction

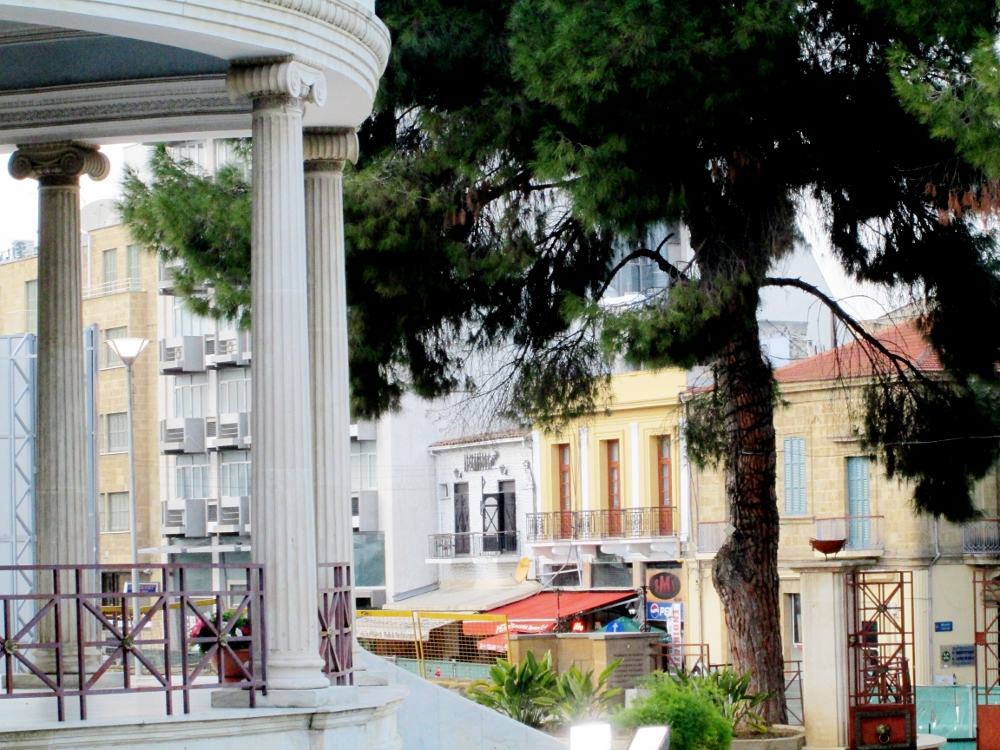
Nicosia Liberty Town Hall

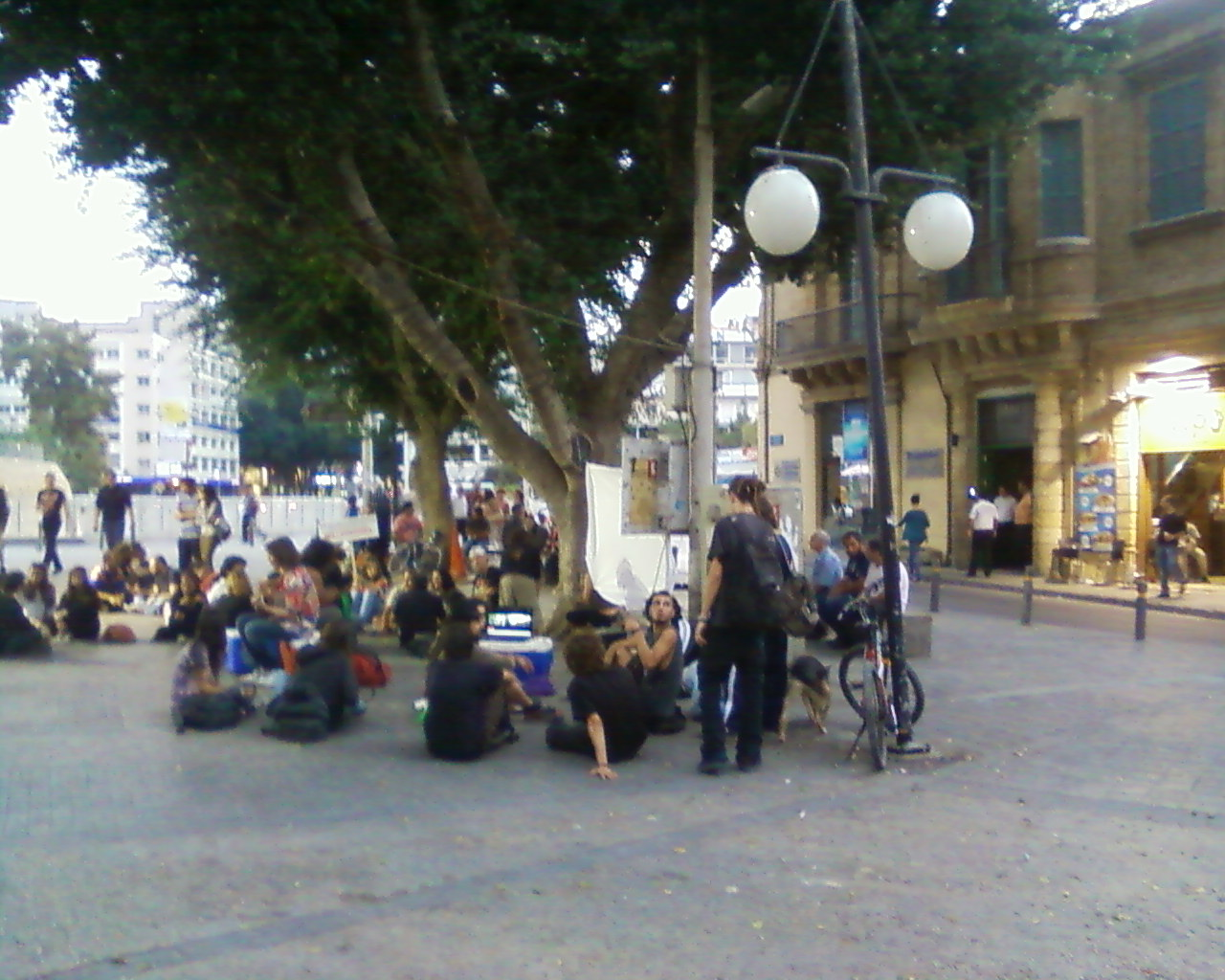
Occupy Buffer Zone movement in 2011
