= 1731 in architecture =

The year 1731 in architecture involved some significant events.

== Buildings and structures ==
=== Buildings ===
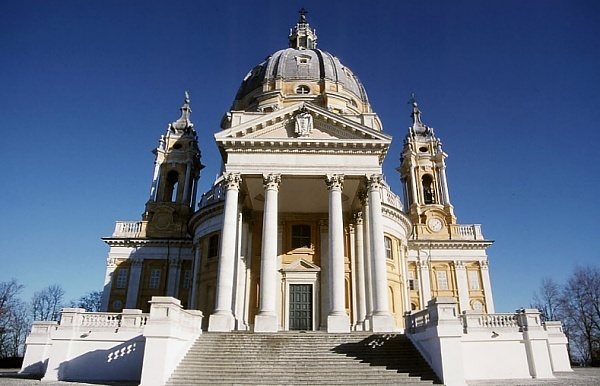
Basilica of Superga in Turin, Italy

- Basilica of Superga in Italy, designed by Filippo Juvarra, is completed.
- Cumbernauld House in Scotland, to designs by William Adam, is built.
- Hôtel Peyrenc de Moras in Paris, designed by Jean Aubert, is completed.
- Jakobstad Church in Finland, designed by Johan Knubb, is built.
- Jerusalem's Church in Berlin, designed by Philipp Gerlach, is completed.
- Royal Theatre in Mantua, Italy, designed by Ferdinando Galli-Bibiena, is built.
- Trooditissa Monastery on Cyprus is built.
- Staircase of Schloss Bruchsal in Baden is designed by Balthasar Neumann.

== Births ==
- January 13 – Carl von Gontard, German architect (d. 1791)
- April 14 – Laurent-Benoît Dewez, Belgian architect (d. 1812)
- May 10 – Victor Louis, French architect (d. 1800)
- Andrea Giganti, Sicilian Baroque architect (d. 1787)
- Approximate date – John Hawks, English-born architect working in the Province of North Carolina (d. 1790)

== Deaths ==
- November 6 – James Smith, Scottish architect (b. c.1645)
- Francesco de Sanctis, Roman architect (b. 1679)
