= Troodos Observatory =

Astronomical observatory in Agridia, Cyprus

Troodos Observatory is an astronomical observatory located in Cyprus. It organizes night-time stargazing events and is home to the largest telescope in Cyprus. Troodos Observatory is located in Agridia, near the villages of Agros, Chandria & Kyperounta. Situated at an altitude of 1,250 meters.

== Architecture and Design ==
The Troodos Observatory was designed by Kyriakos Tsolakis Architects, with architects Elena K. Tsolakis, Nicodemos K. Tsolakis and Cassandra K. Tsolakis. Its distinctive angular form and reflective metal cladding draw inspiration from the surrounding Troodos mountain landscape. The observatory includes facilities for astronomical observation, including a night-sky telescope, a solar telescope and an outdoor observation platform.

=== International Architecture Awards ===
The design has received global recognition for its architectural quality, including:

- 2024: World Architecture Festival: Winner, Civic and Community category (Completed Buildings).
- 2025: SHARE Architecture Awards: Overall Winner.
- 2026: BIG SEE Architecture Awards: Grand Prix, Public, Civic and Administration Buildings category.
- 2026: International Architecture Awards: Award recipient, presented by the Chicago Athenaeum and the European Centre for Architecture Art Design and Urban Studies.

== Historical background ==
Work on the observatory and the landscaping of the surrounding area began in 2017, with a budget of €1,600,000 (1.6 million). It's creation was part of the Geostars program, which aims to boost isolated rural areas in Cyprus and Crete.
