= Macarius I =

Macarius I may refer to:

- Macarius I of Antioch, patriarch from 656 to 681
- Pope Macarius I of Alexandria, ruled in 932–952
- Makarije Sokolović, Serbian Patriarch from 1557 to 1571
- Makarios I of Cyprus, Archbishop of Cyprus from 1854 until 1865
- Macarius Bulgakov, Metropolitan of Moscow and Kolomna in 1879–1882
