= Faneromeni Square =

Coordinates: 35.1735°N 33.3628°E

- Πλατεία Φανερωμένης (Greek); Faneromeni Meydanı (Turkish)
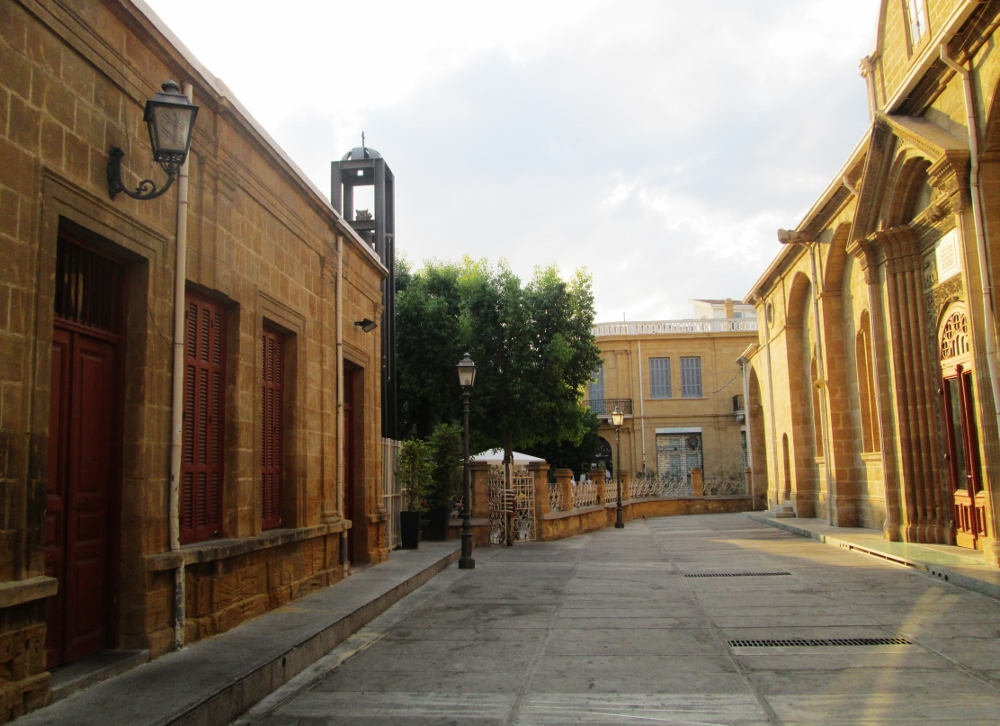
- Nicosia, Cyprus

Information
- Type: Public, historical

Faneromeni Square (Greek: Πλατεία Φανερωμένης; Turkish: Faneromeni Meydanı) is an important historical square in Nicosia, Cyprus. It is in an ancient part of Nicosia, within city walls built when it was under Venetian rule.

It hosts a number of historical buildings and monuments including Faneromeni Church, Faneromeni School, Faneromeni Library, and the Marble Mausoleum.

== Overview and historical background ==
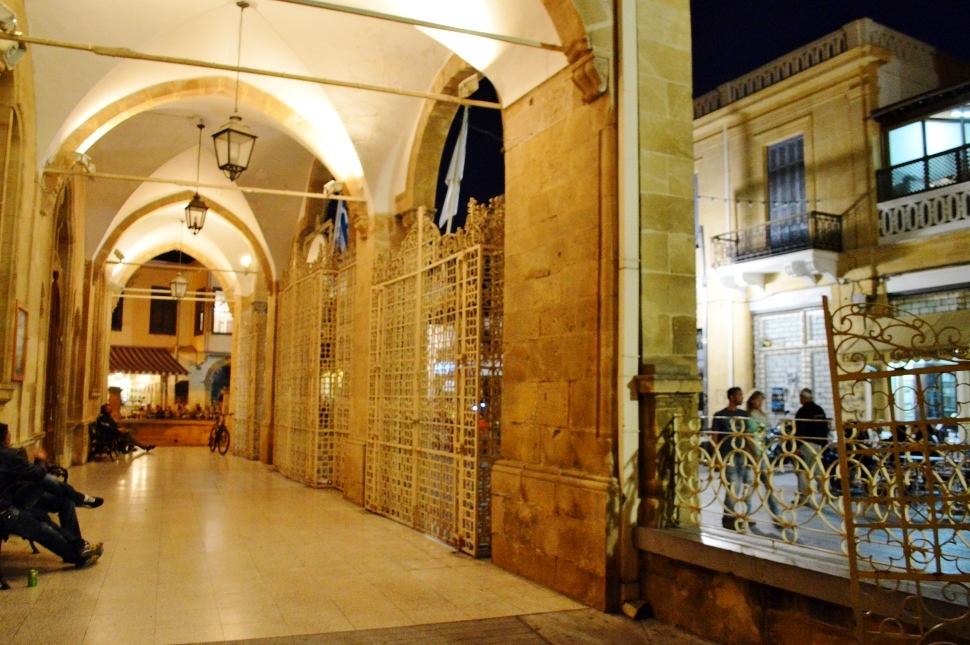
Faneromeni Church by night, Nicosia, Cyprus

Faneromeni Square was the centre of Nicosia before Eleftheria Square superseded it in 1974.

Faneromeni Church dominates the centre of the square; it was built in 1872 on the site of an ancient Orthodox nunnery. The church is dedicated to Holy Mary and it is the largest church within the city walls of Nicosia. Architecturally the church edifice features a mixture of Neoclassical, Byzantine and Medieval Latin styles.

Faneromeni School, founded by Archbishop Makarios I in 1857, was the first all-girls school in Cyprus. It was founded to improve rates of literacy among girls and women on the island.

The Marble Mausoleum on the eastern side of Faneromeni Church is situated at the front of the building. It was built in memory of four clerics executed by the Ottoman governor in 1821, following the Cypriot revolt after the Greek War of Independence was declared.

The square is surrounded by several Neoclassical buildings featuring predominantly Greek, as well as local Cypriot, architectural influences. These include the Faneromeni Library.

Today the square is a meeting point for the anarchist movement of Cyprus, anti-authoritarians, libertarians, many artists and musicians. It is also a stronghold of the antifascist movement on the island. The square is considered a central point for counterculture on the island.

== Gallery ==
=== Historical buildings and monuments ===
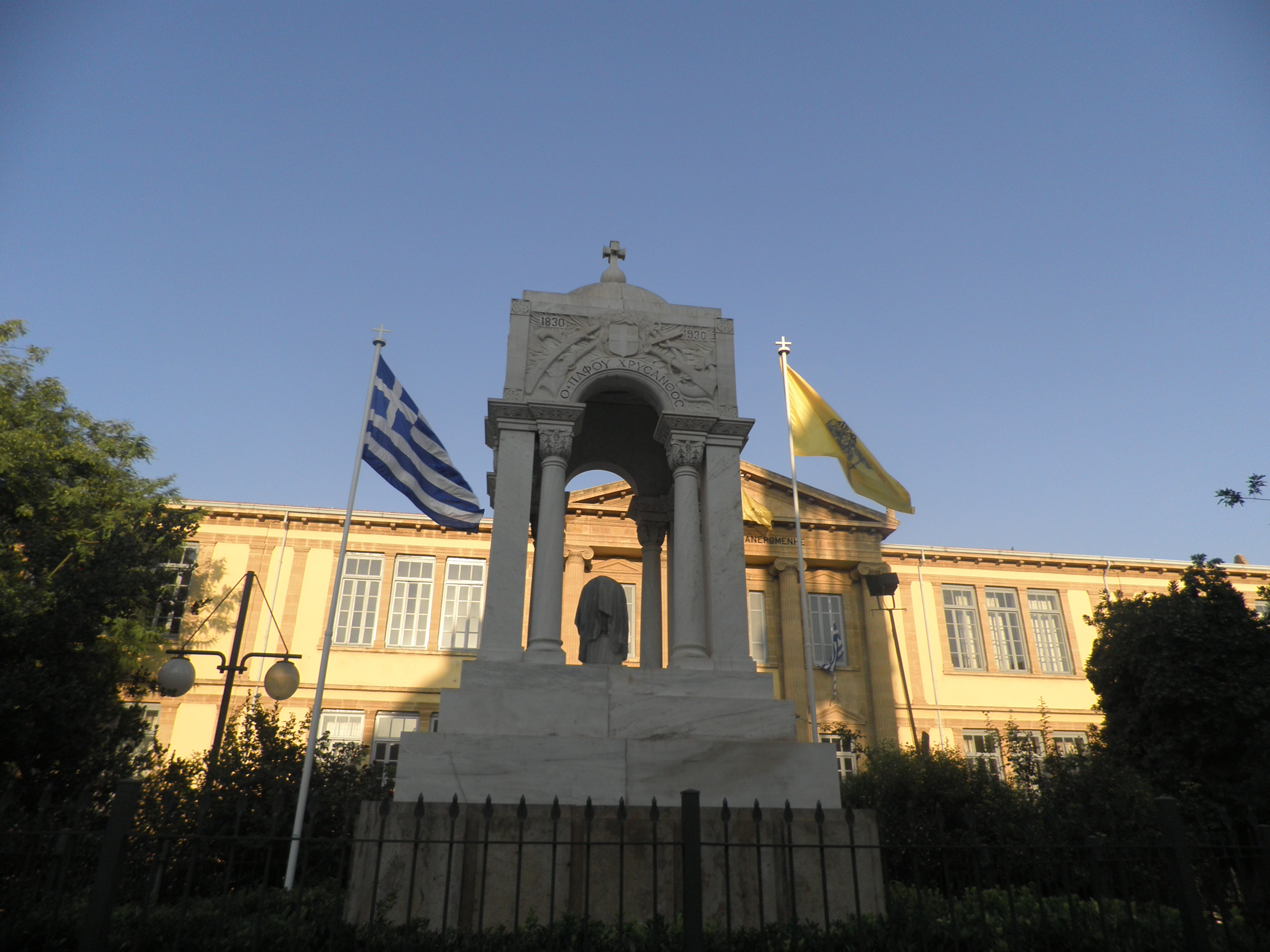
Marble Mausoleum & Faneromeni School

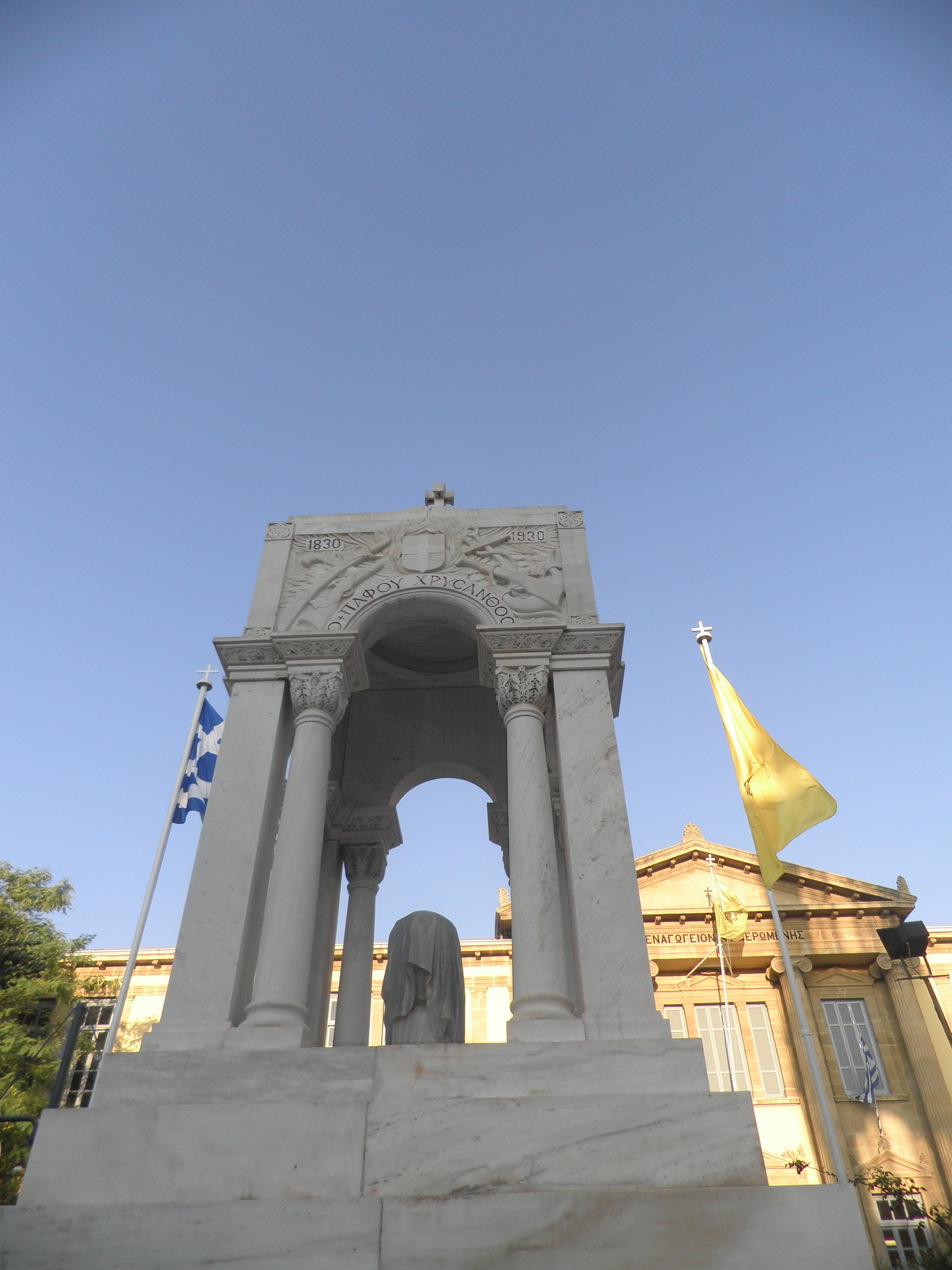
Marble Mausoleum in Faneromeni Square

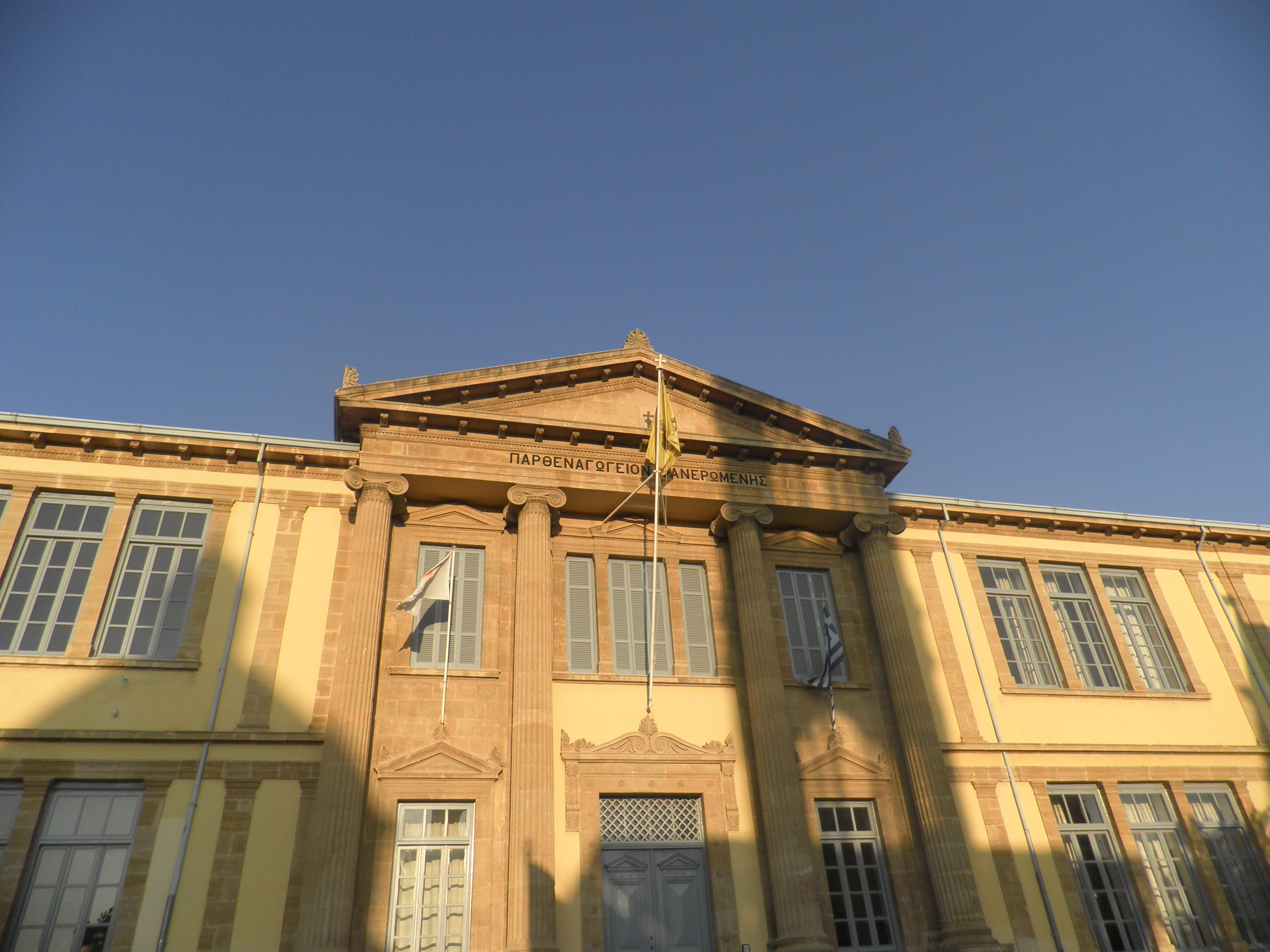
Faneromeni School façade

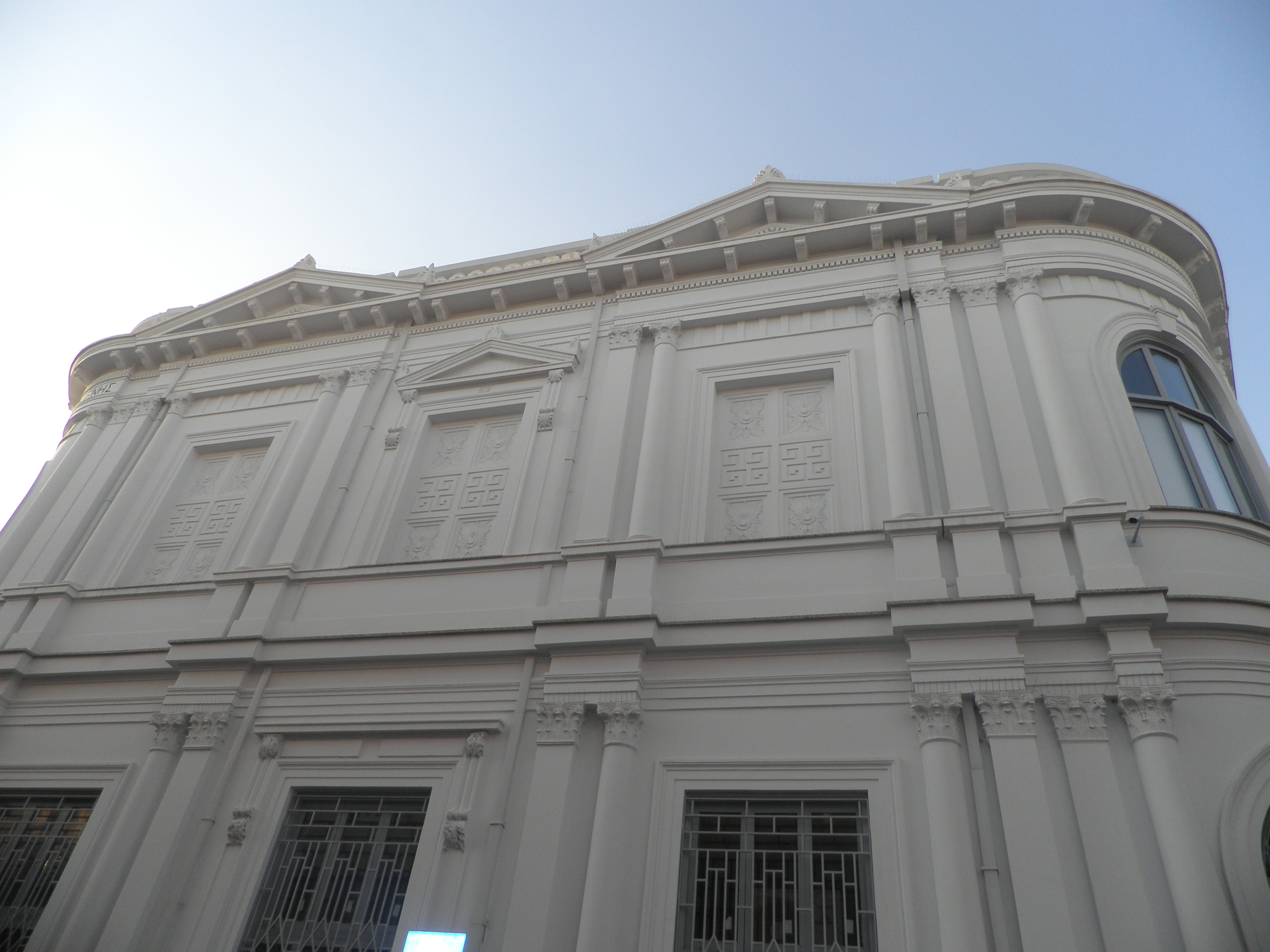
Faneromeni Library

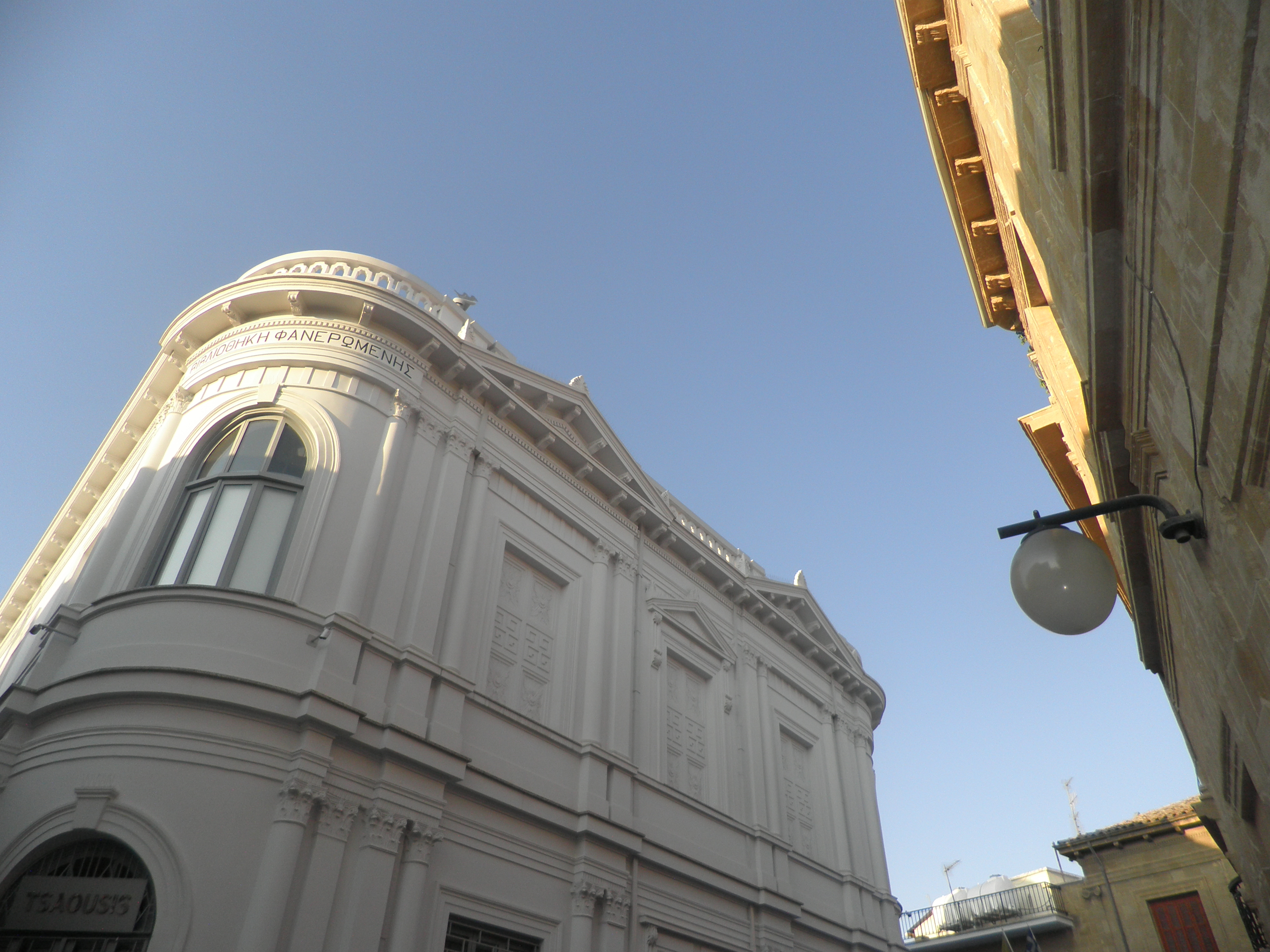
Faneromeni Library

== Faneromeni Church ==
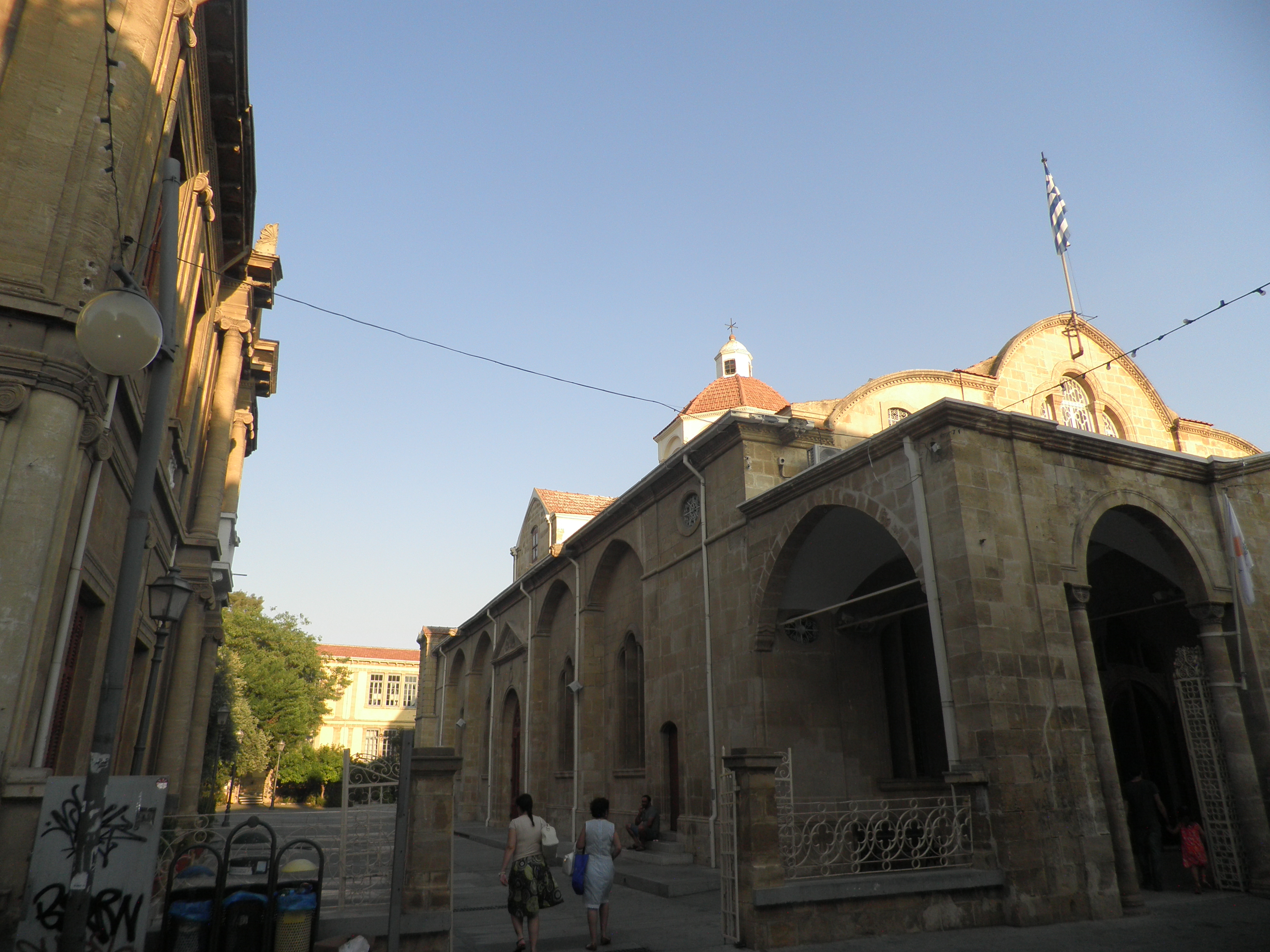
Faneromeni Church: entrance to the square

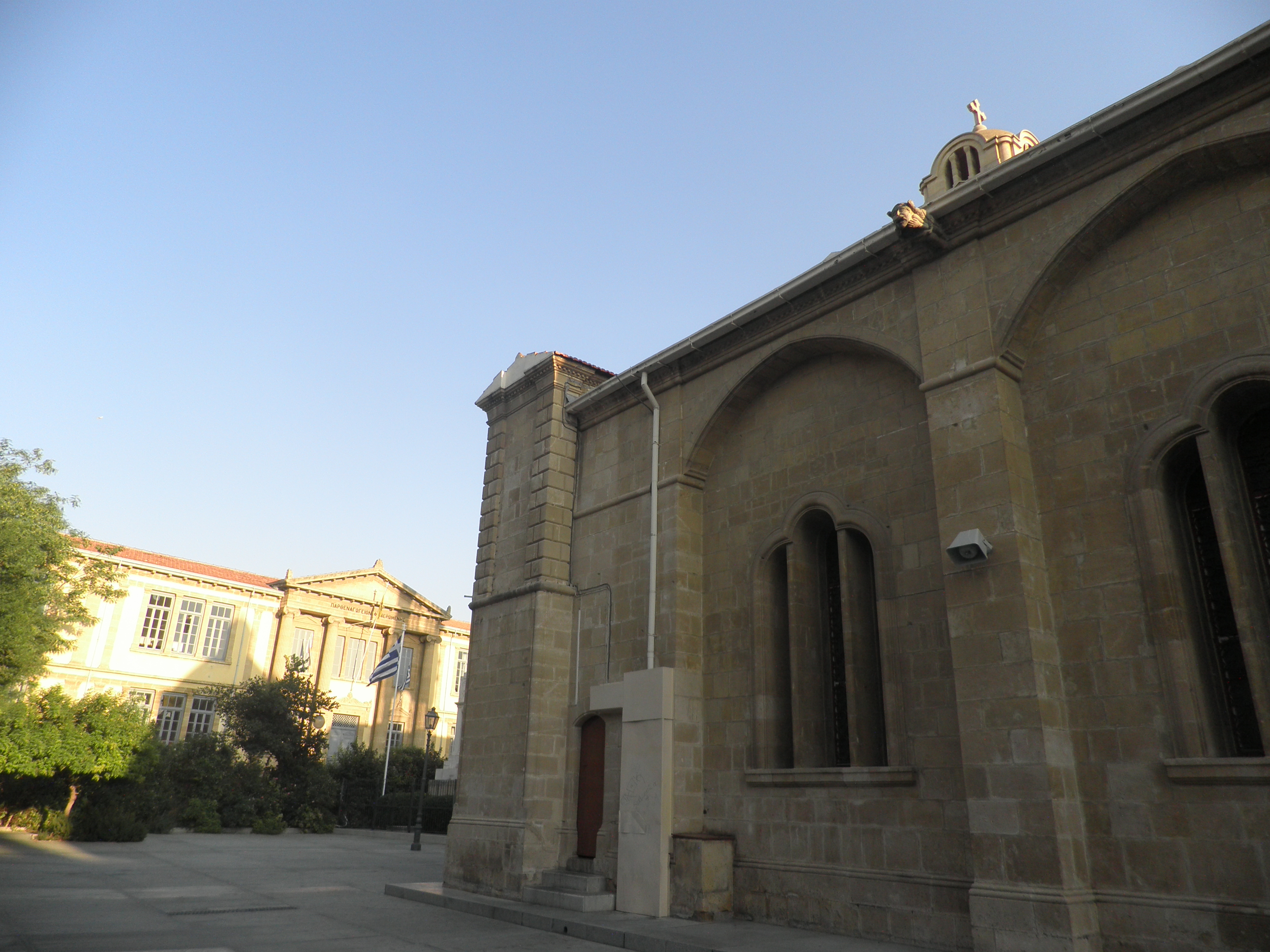
Faneromeni Church and School

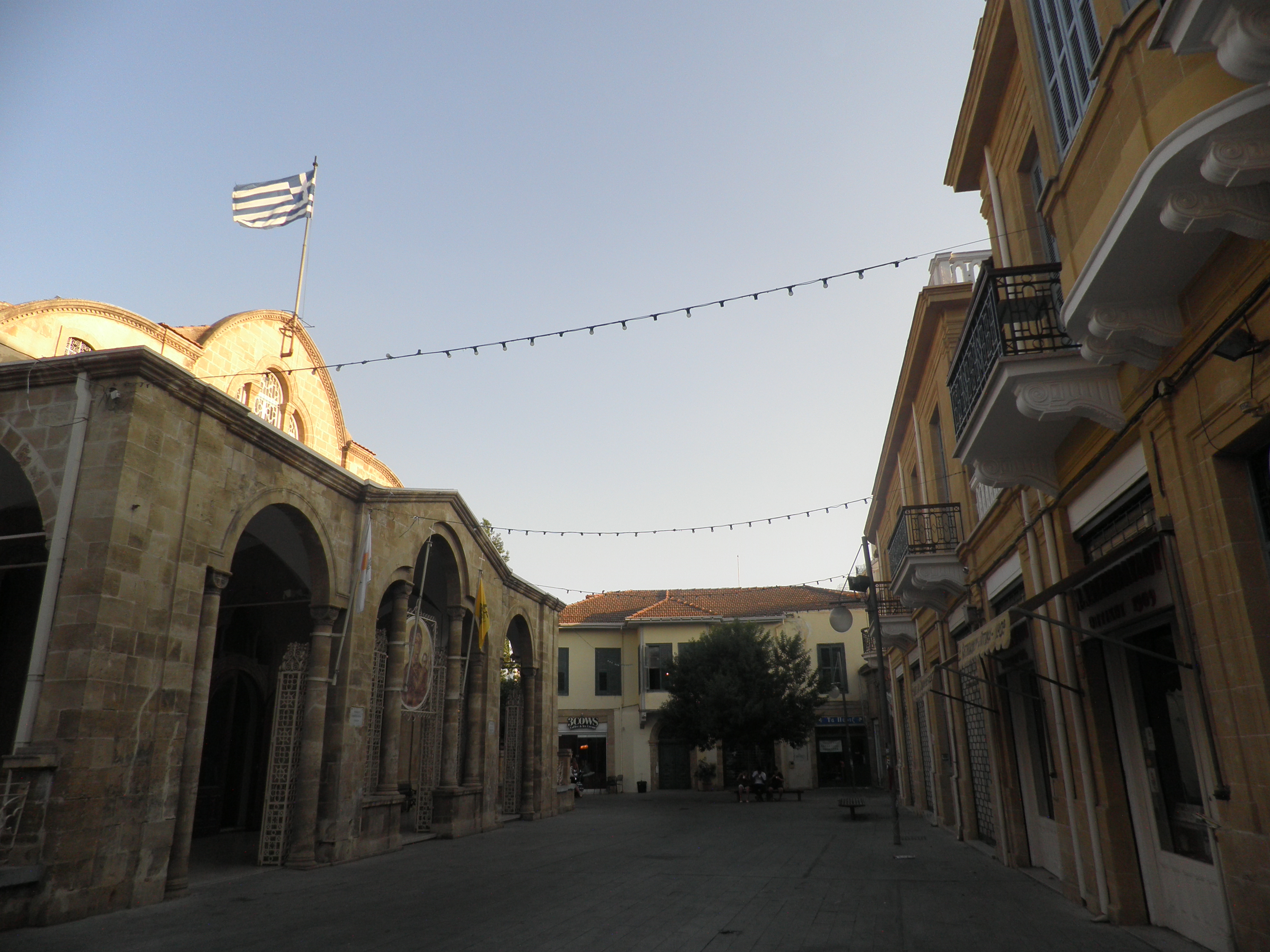
Faneromeni Church façade

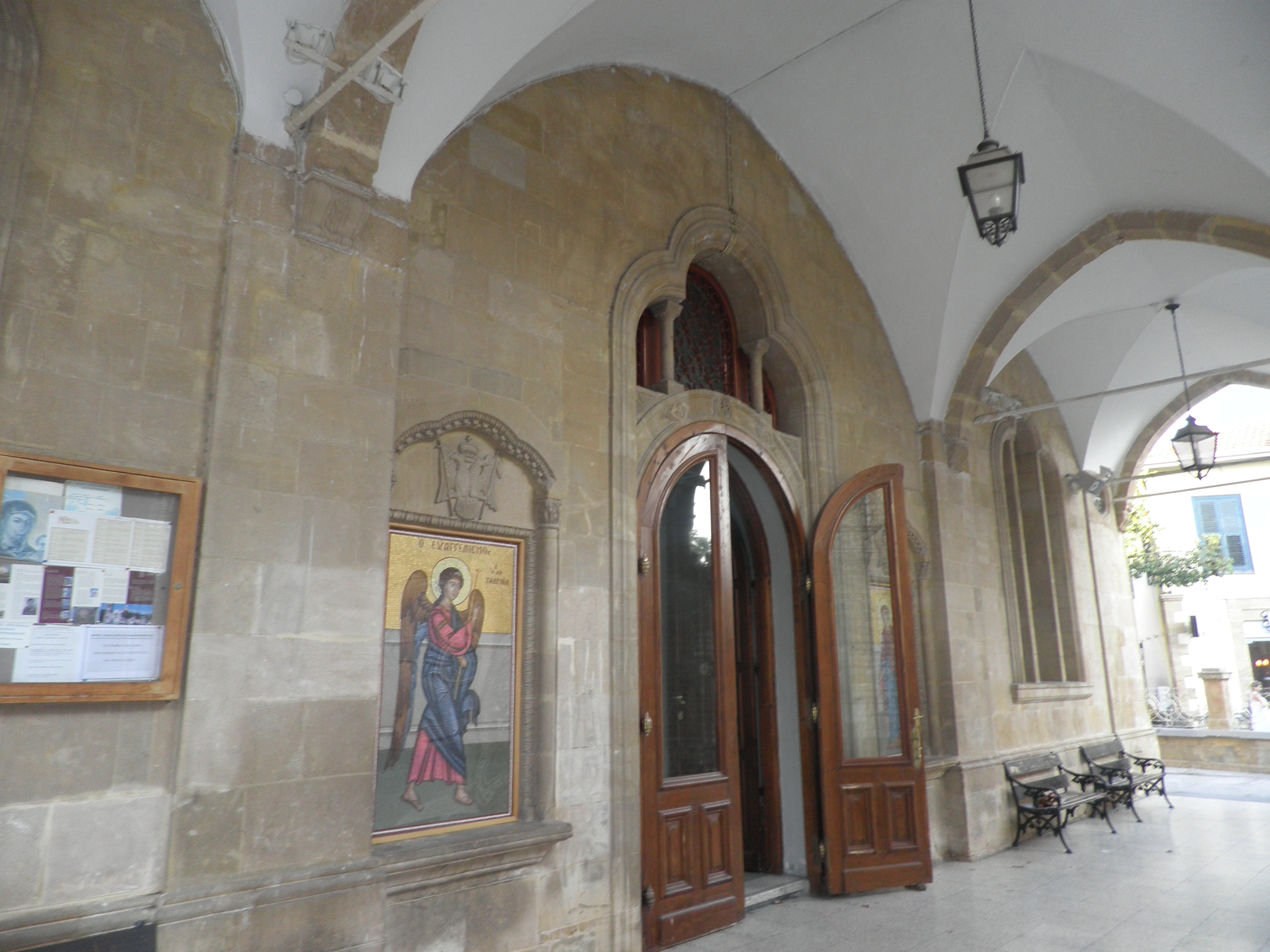
Faneromeni Church façade (detail)

=== Typical architecture ===
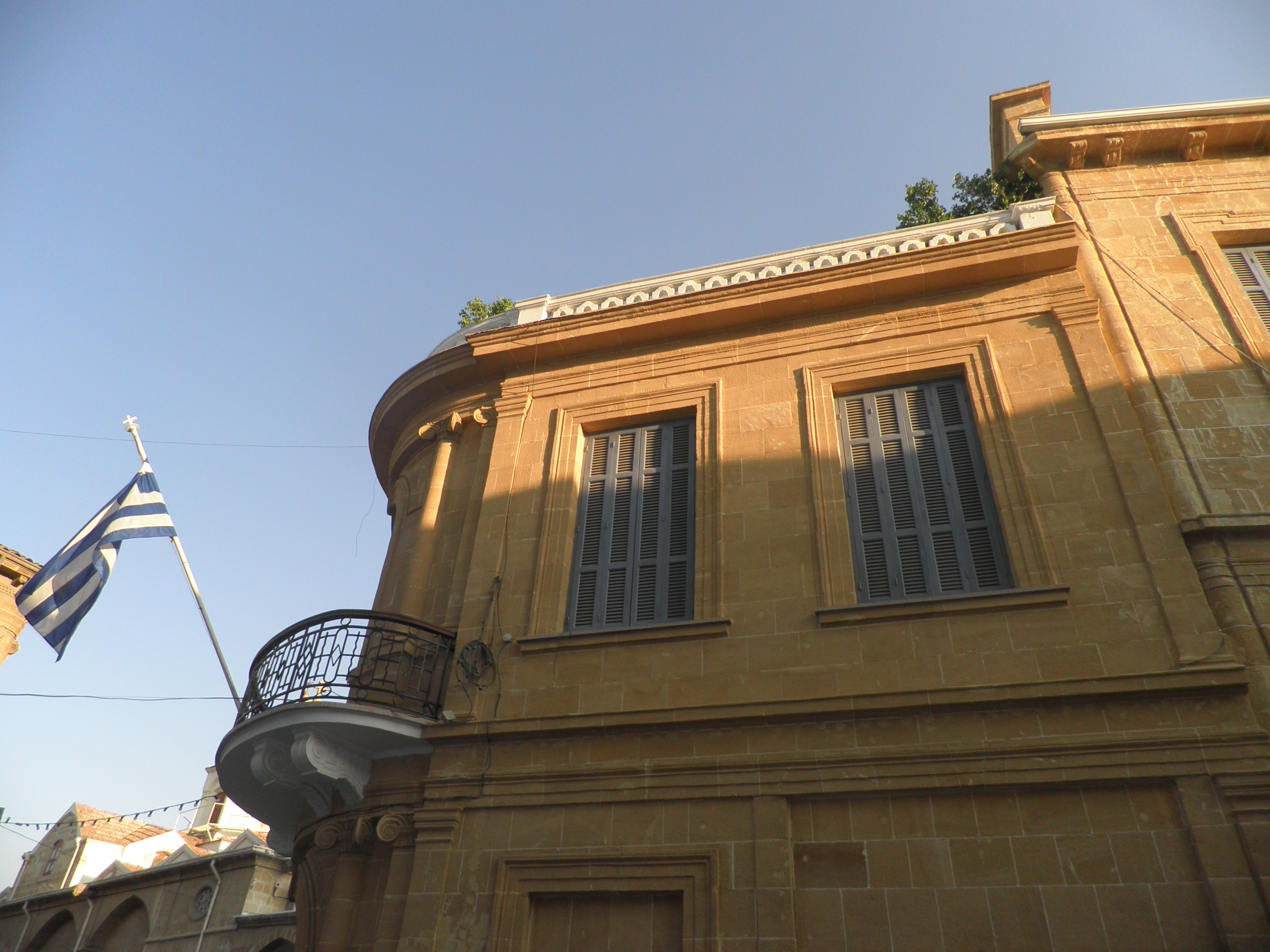
Typical architecture with Faneromeni Church in the background

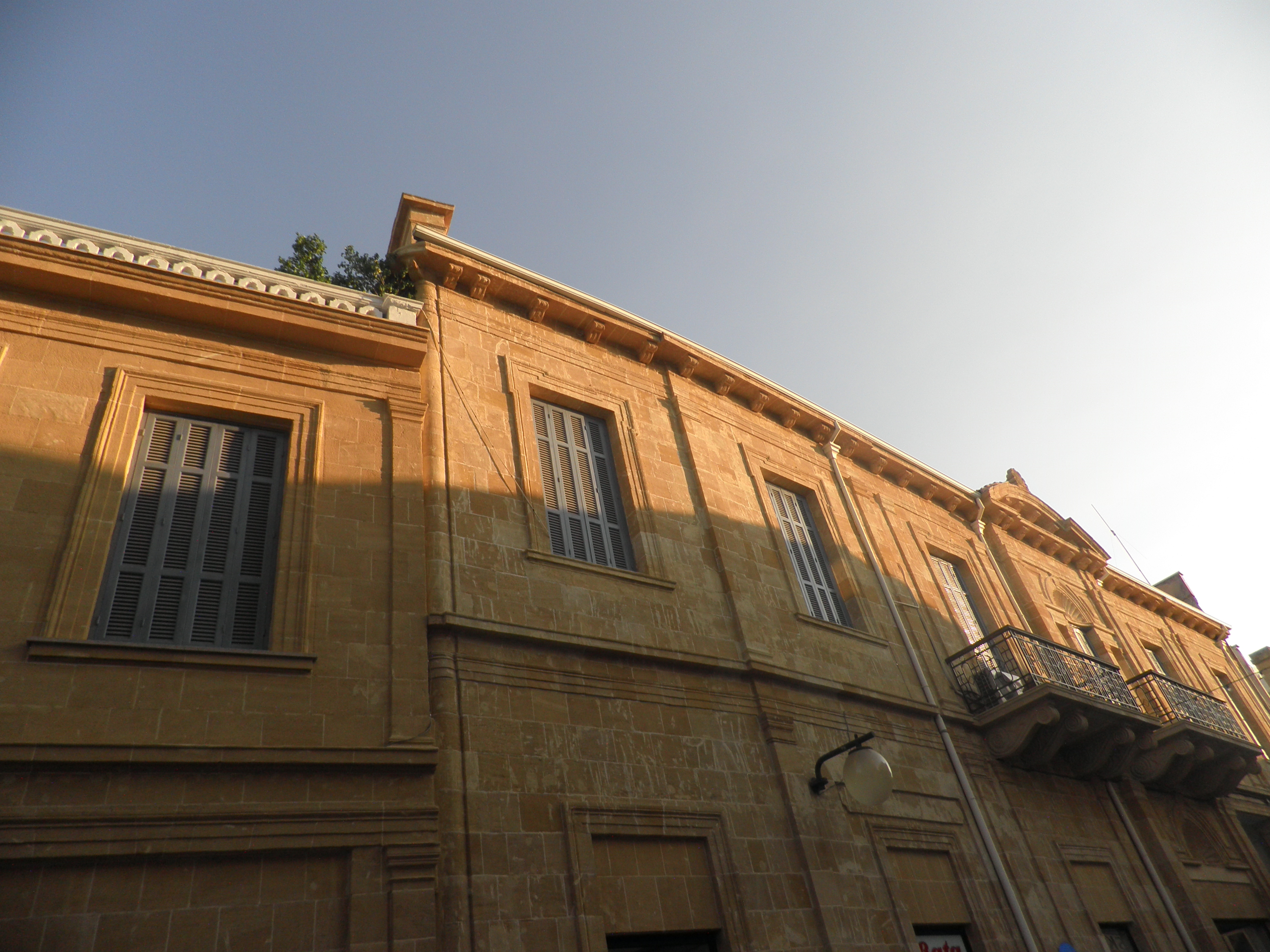
Traditional architecture

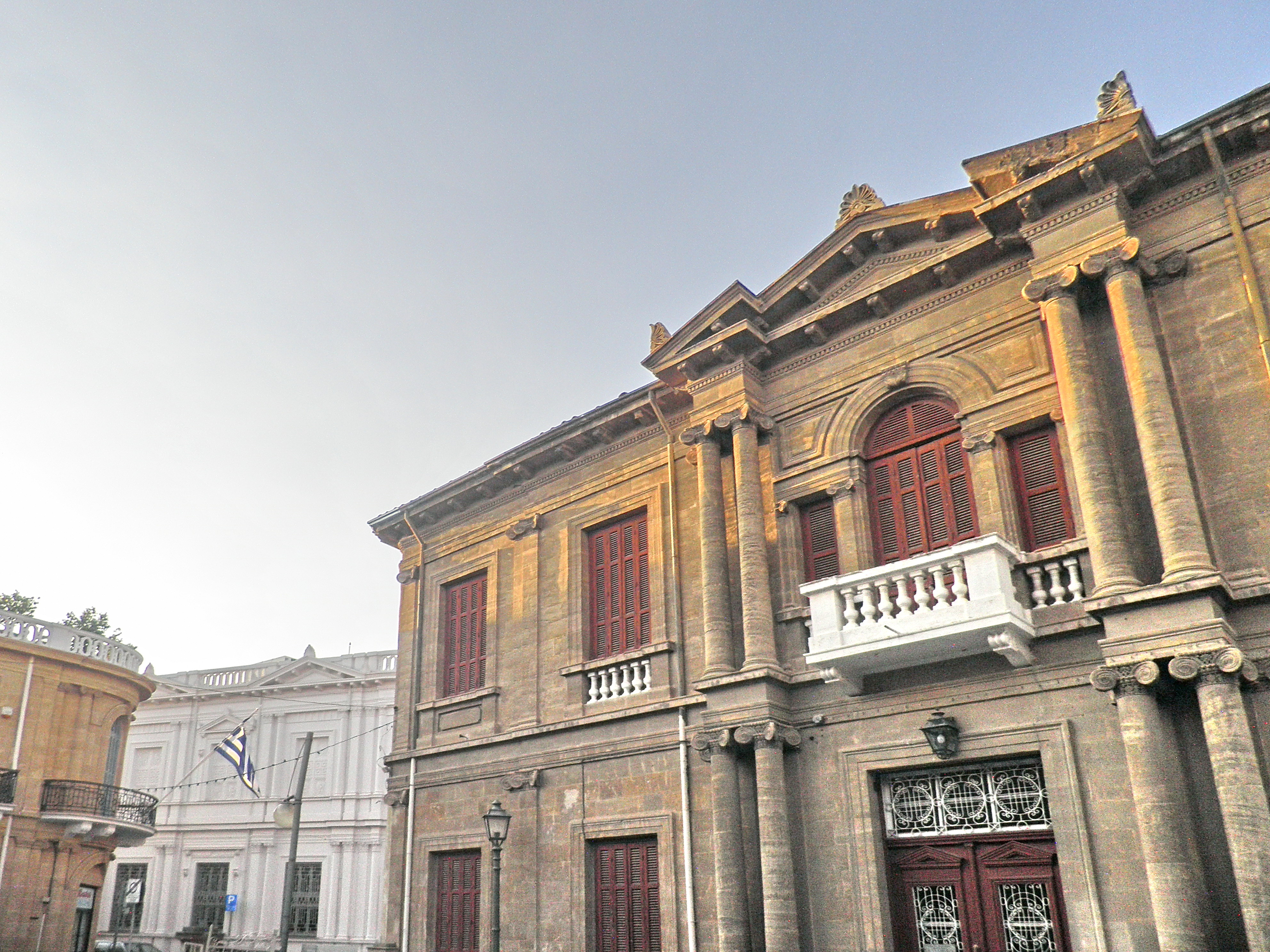
Building with traditional Greek and local Cypriot Neoclassical features

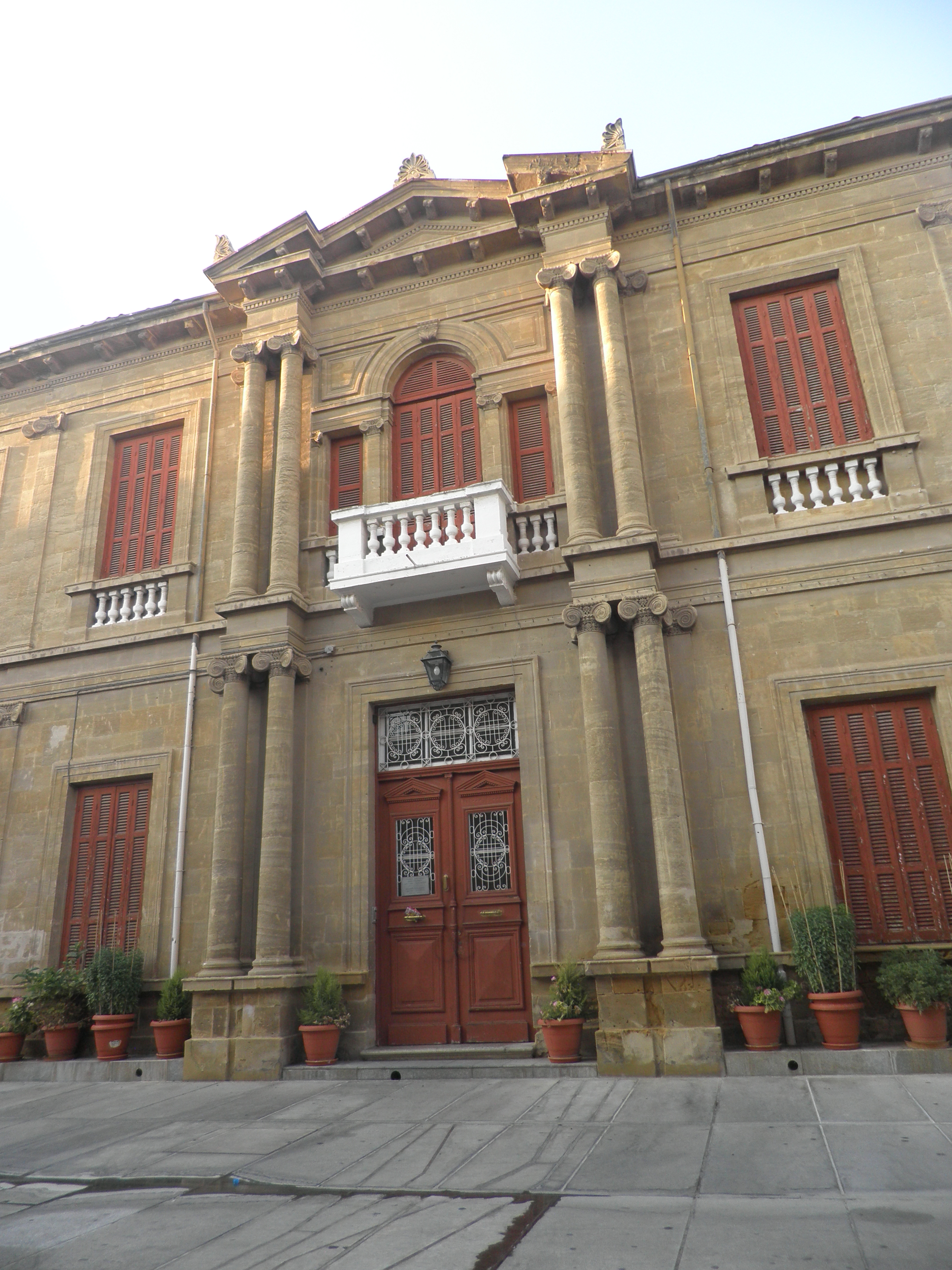
Detail of building adjacent to Faneromeni Church

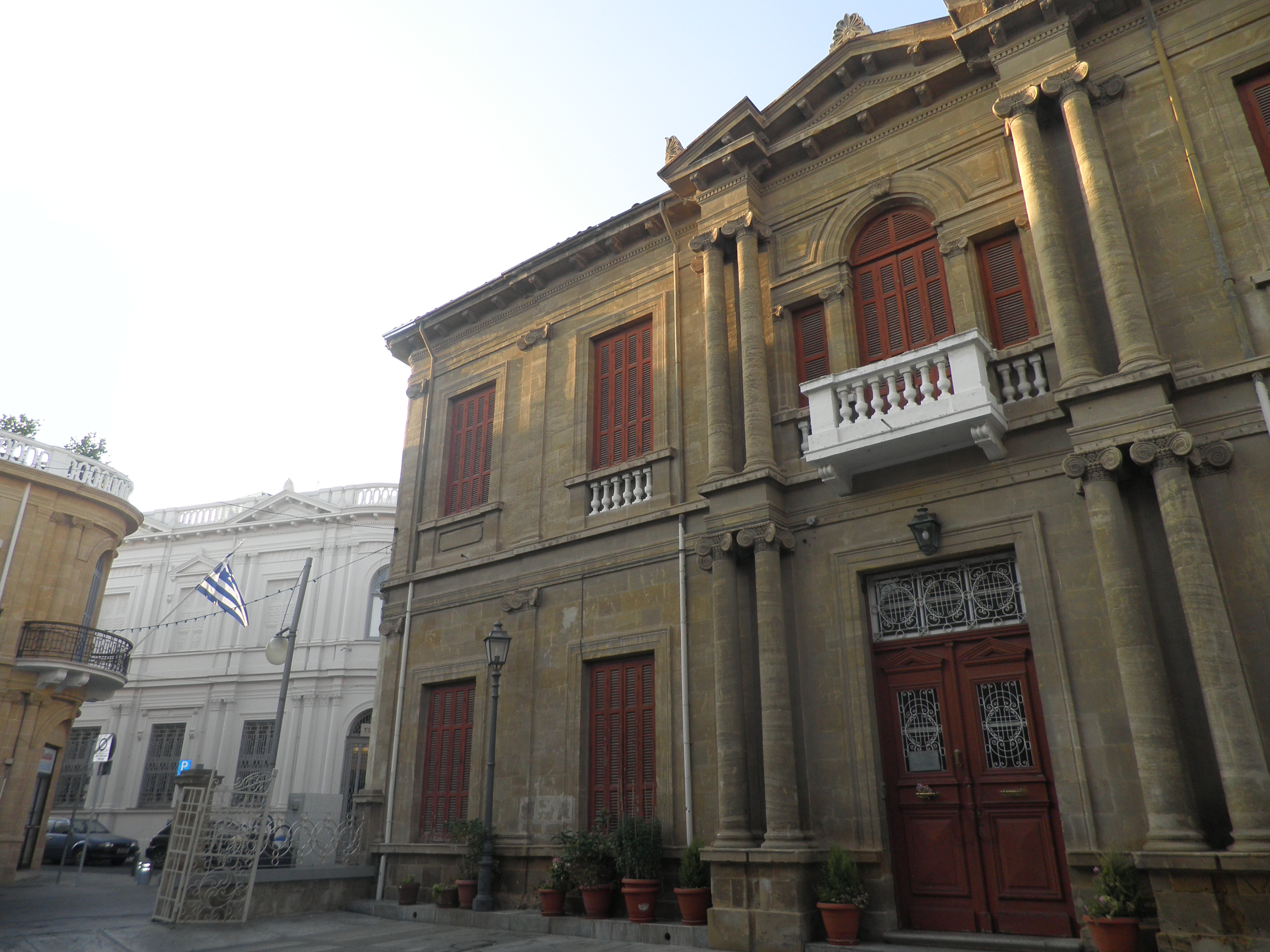
Cluster of Neoclassical buildings and Faneromeni Library
