= Faneromeni School =

Coordinates: 35.1733°N 33.3633°E

- Παρθεναγωγείο Φανερωμένης (Greek); Faneromeni Okulu (Turkish)
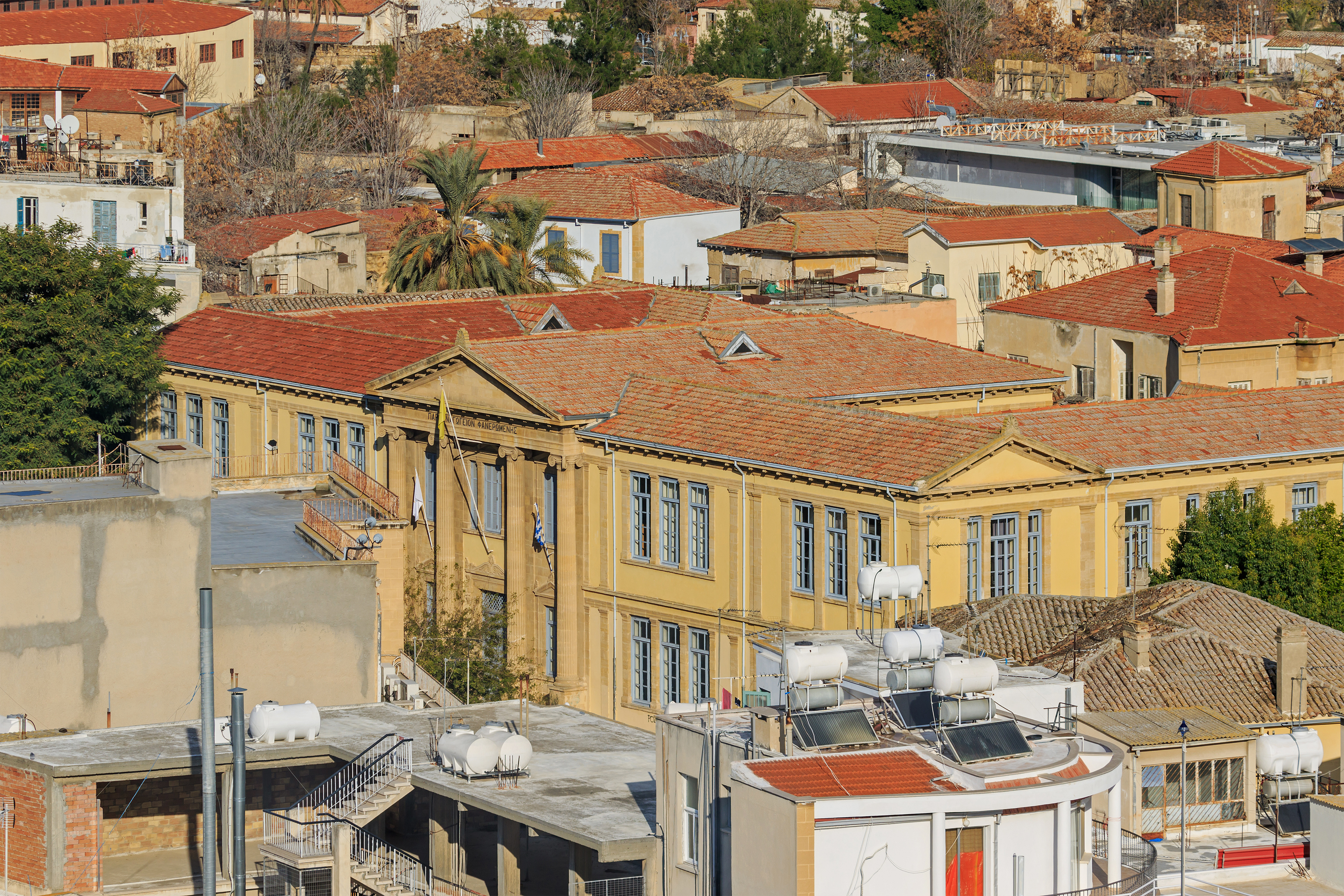
- Aerial view of the school
- Nicosia, Cyprus

Information
- Type: Public school
- Established: 1857; 169 years ago
- Founder: Archbishop Makarios I

Faneromeni School (Greek: Παρθεναγωγείο Φανερωμένης; Turkish: Faneromeni Okulu), founded by Archbishop Makarios I in 1857, was the first all-girls school in Cyprus.

The founder of the School, Archbishop Makarios I, was instrumental in the establishment of many other schools throughout the island of Cyprus in order to combat illiteracy.

The School is located in the historical Faneromeni Square, situated in the centre of the capital and within the Venetian medieval walls of Nicosia.

The School building features predominantly Greek neoclassical architectural traits, as well as, local Cypriot elements.

The Marble Mausoleum on the eastern side of Faneromeni Church is situated on the front of the building and was built in memory of four clerics executed by the Ottoman governor in 1821, following the Cypriot revolt due to the newly declared Greek Revolution.

Today it is a co-ed school and the same building houses a nursery, primary and high schools. In 2014 it was announced that the building will be leased to house the University of Cyprus' school of Architecture.

== History ==
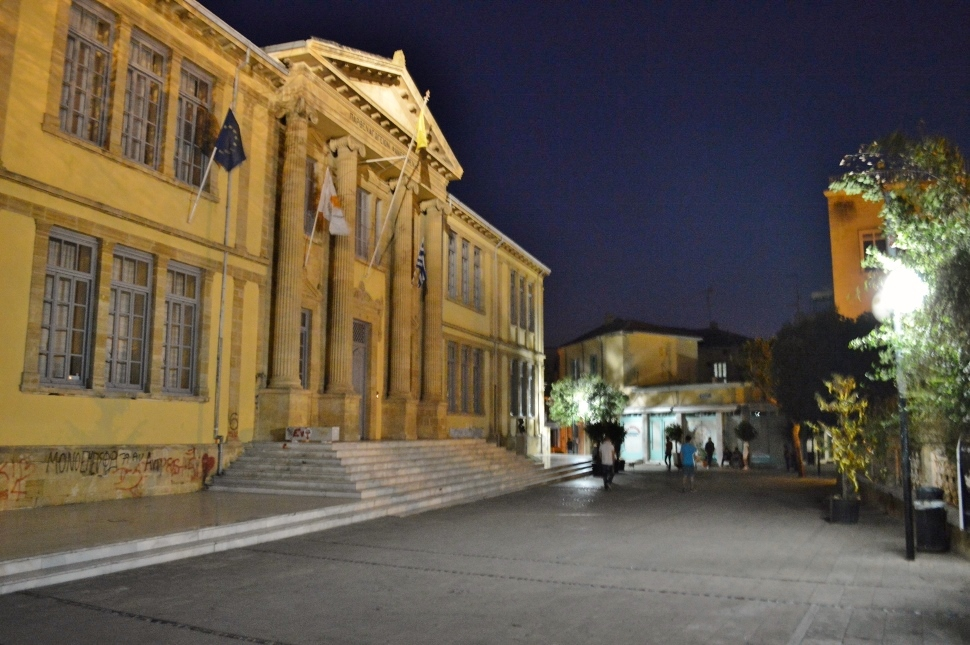
View of Faneromeni School by night

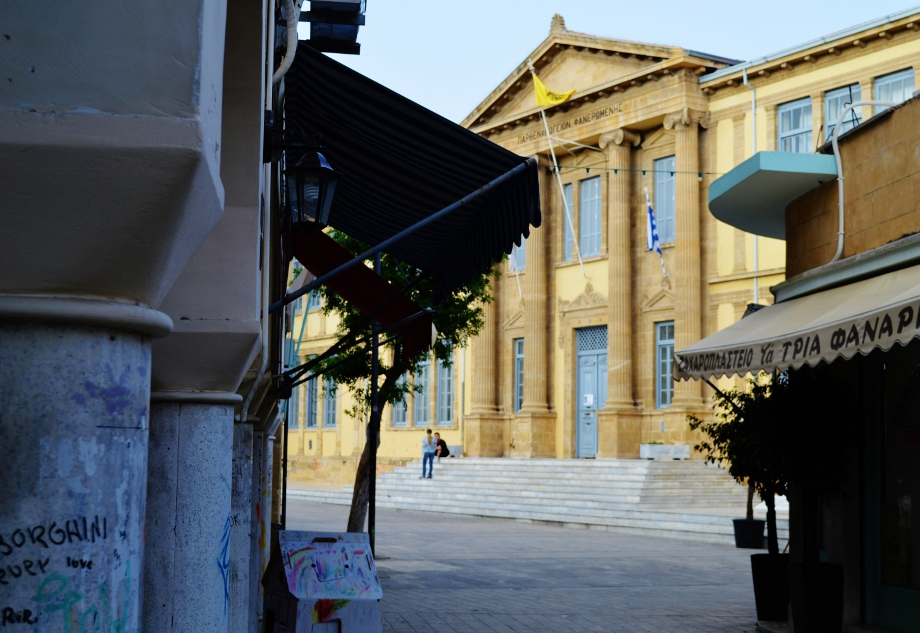
View of Faneromeni School

The school was established in 1852 through significant efforts by the Greek Orthodox Church, particularly supported by the Faneromeni church located directly opposite the school. Initially designated as a "parthenagogeio," meaning a Girls Only School, it began with 115 students but only one teacher. To manage such a large number, the teacher relied on older children to assist as teacher's assistants for the younger students.

As from 1903 Faneromeni School was also used for the training of the female teachers. The school took its present form in 1924 with financial assistance from the Faneromeni Church. Nowadays the school is a public school for boys and girls. Within the same building there is a nursery school, a primary school and a high school.

== Gallery ==
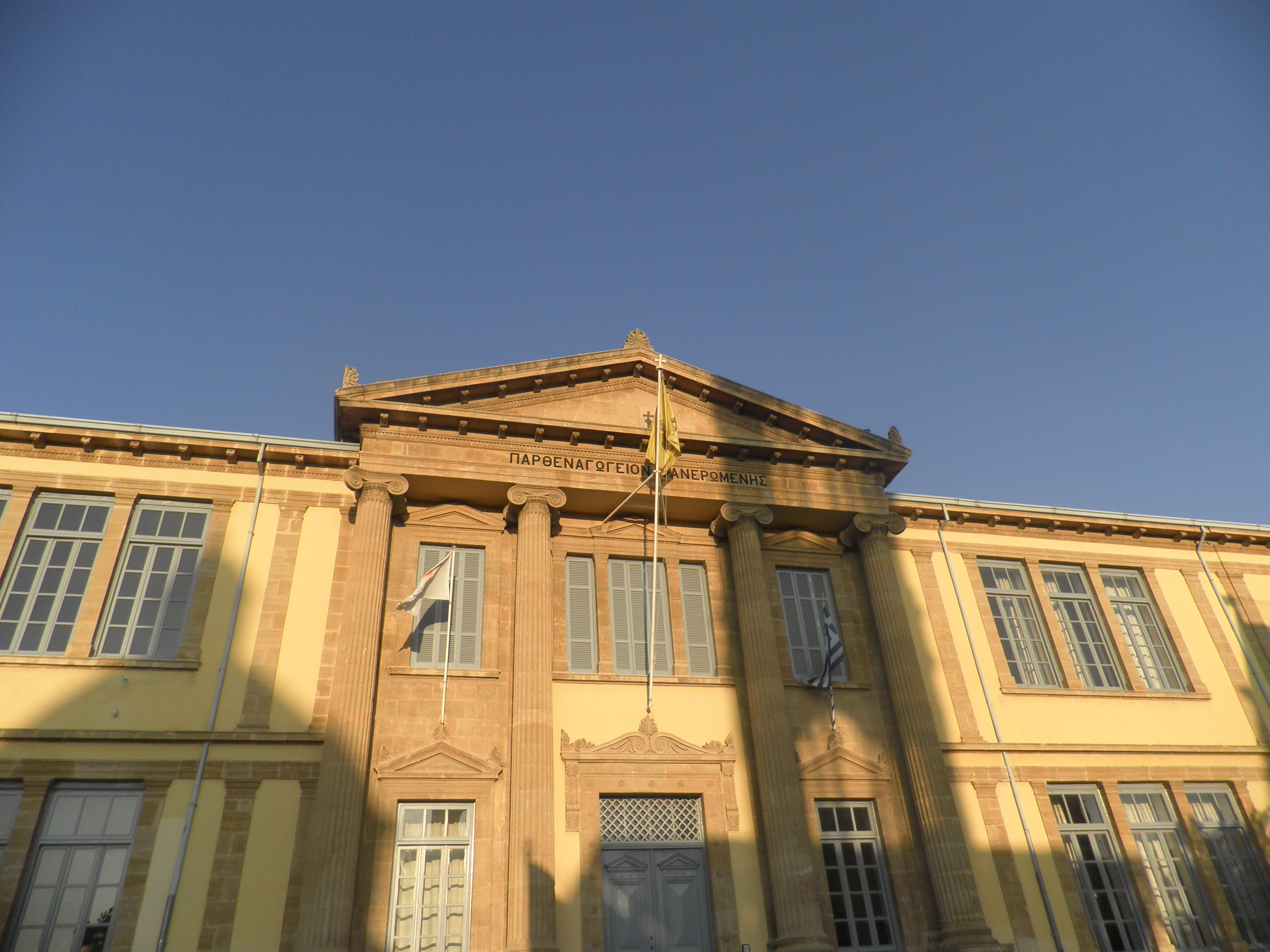
Faneromeni School façade

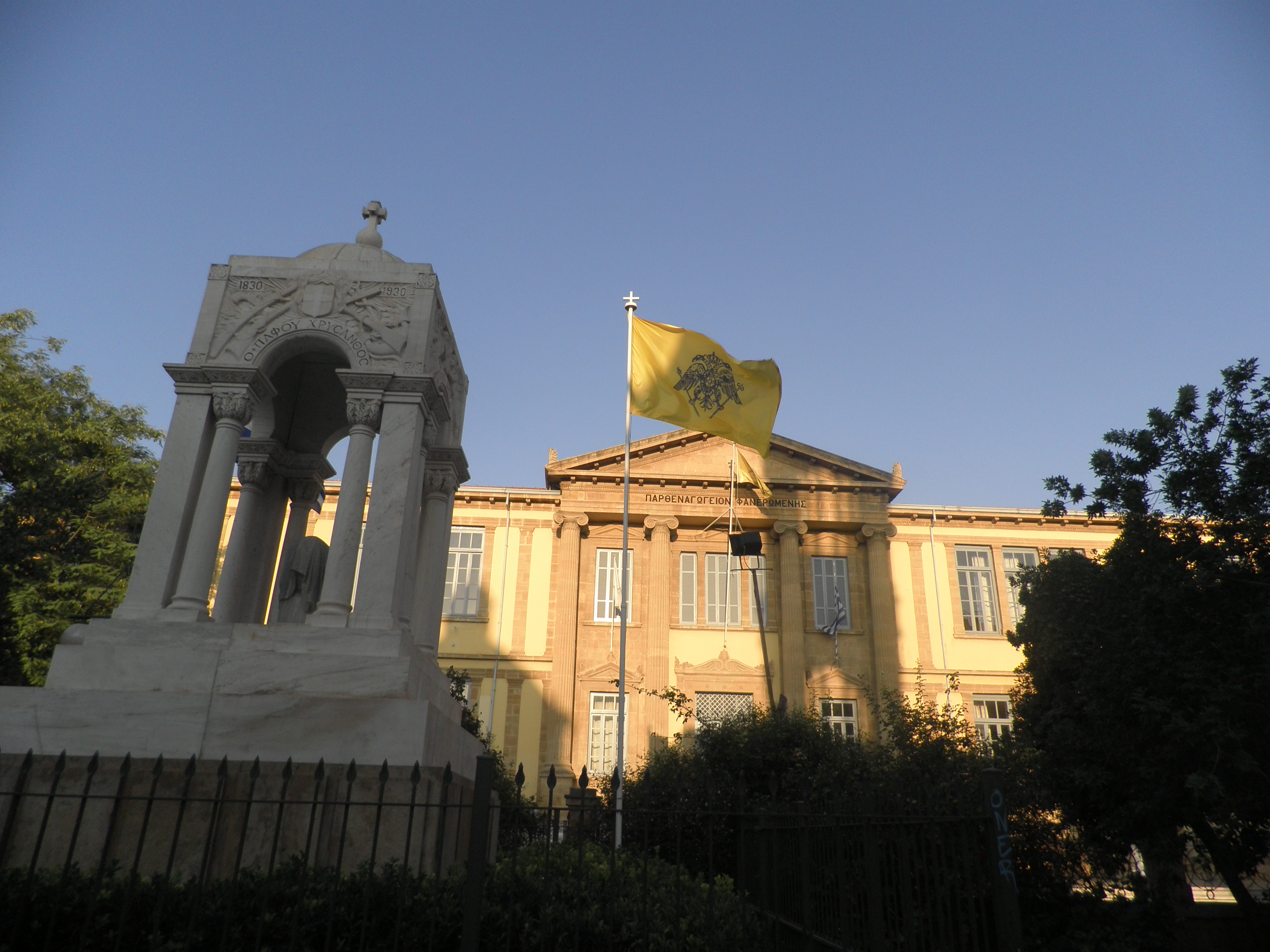
Faneromeni Square view with the Byzantine flag

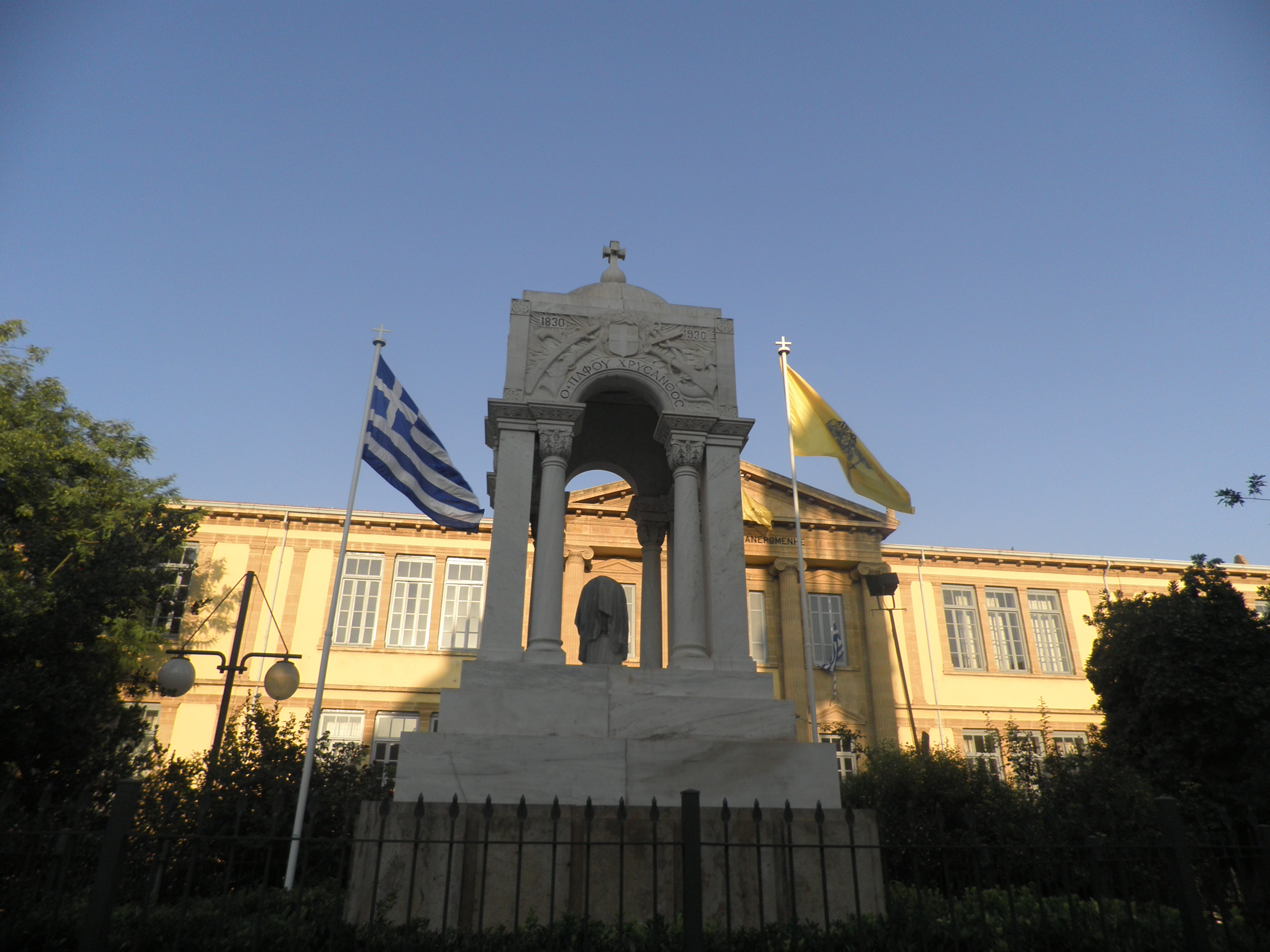
Marble Mausoleum and Faneromeni School

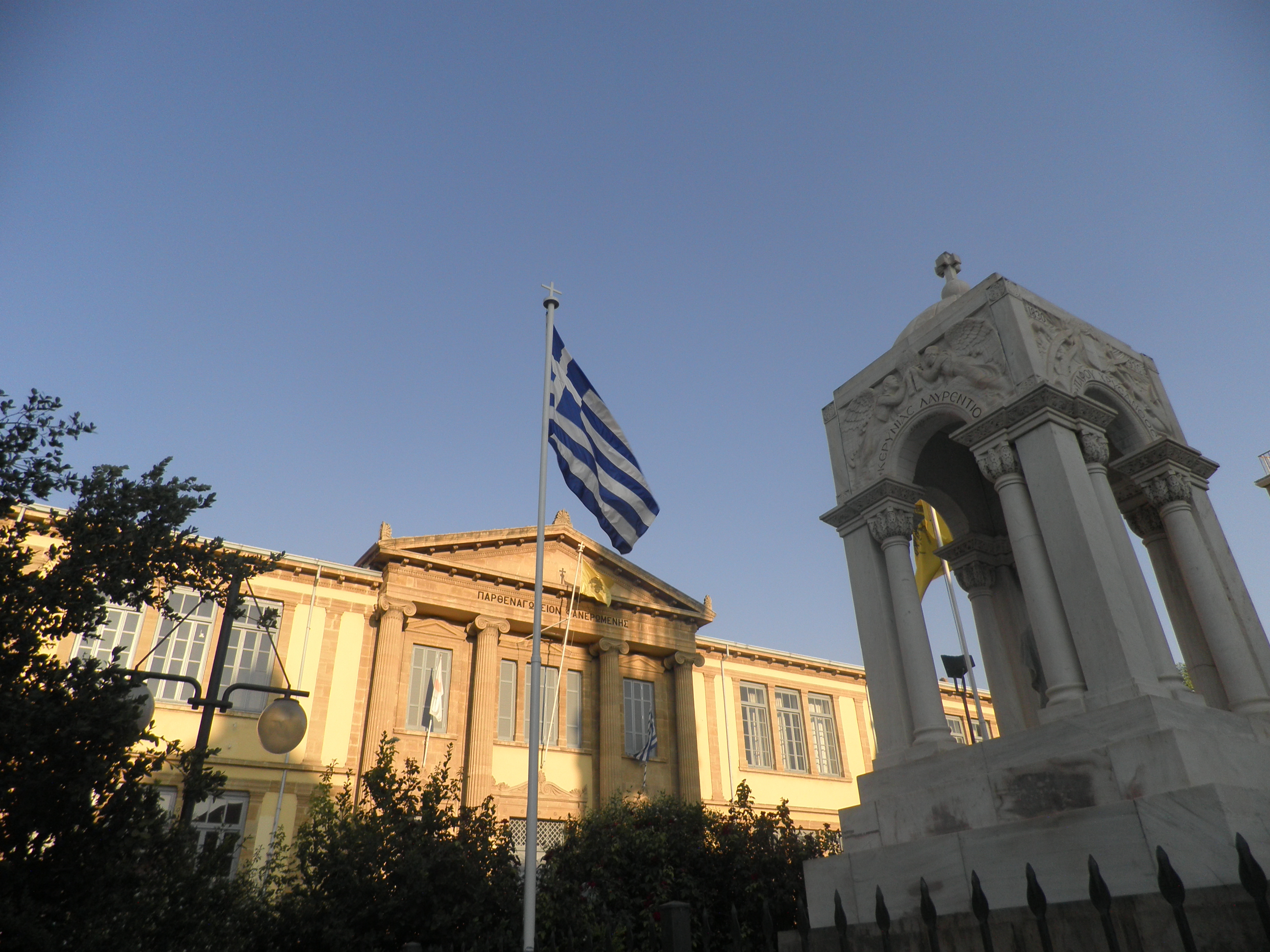
Marble Mausoleum and Faneromeni School
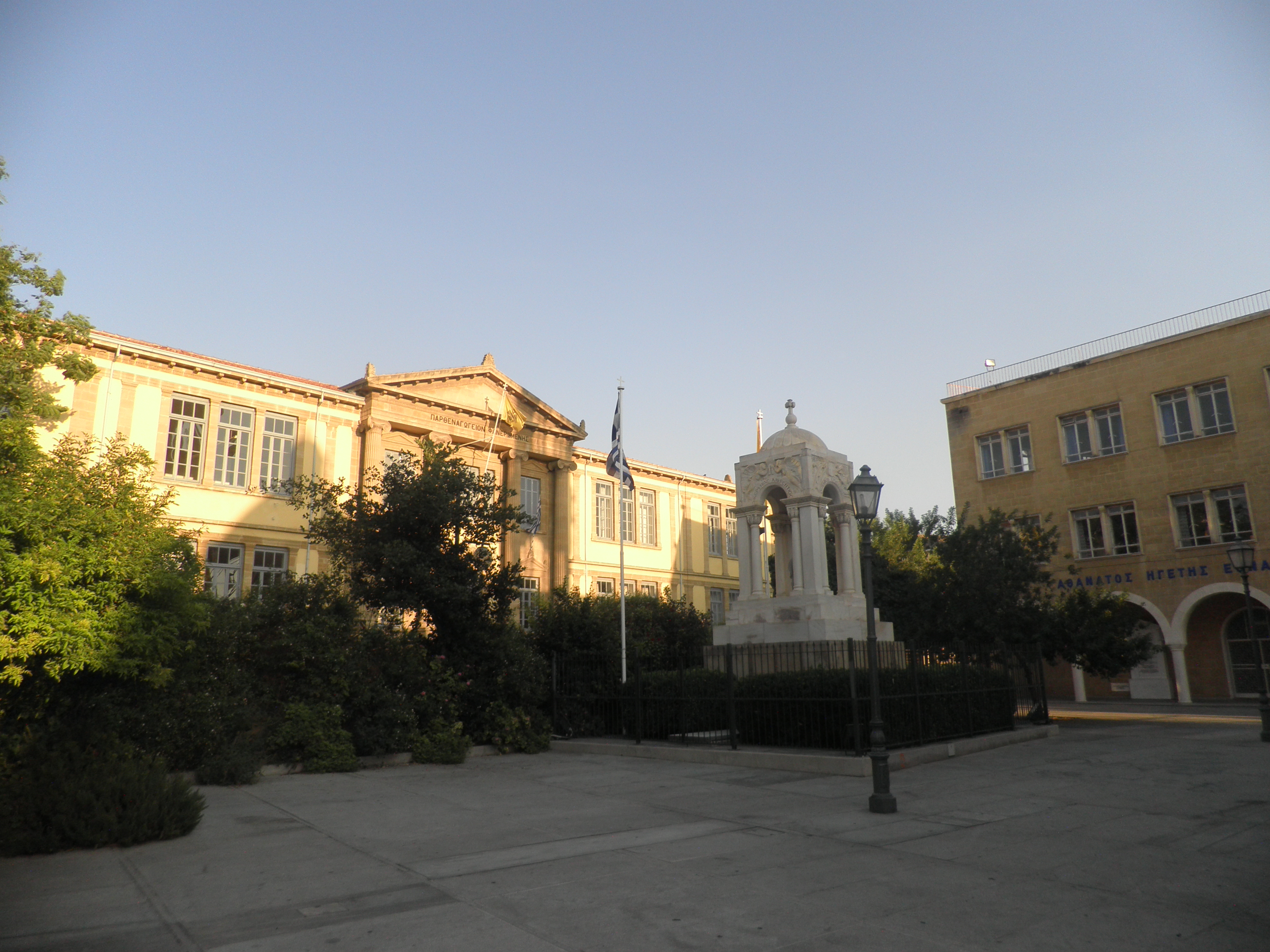
Faneromeni Square & School

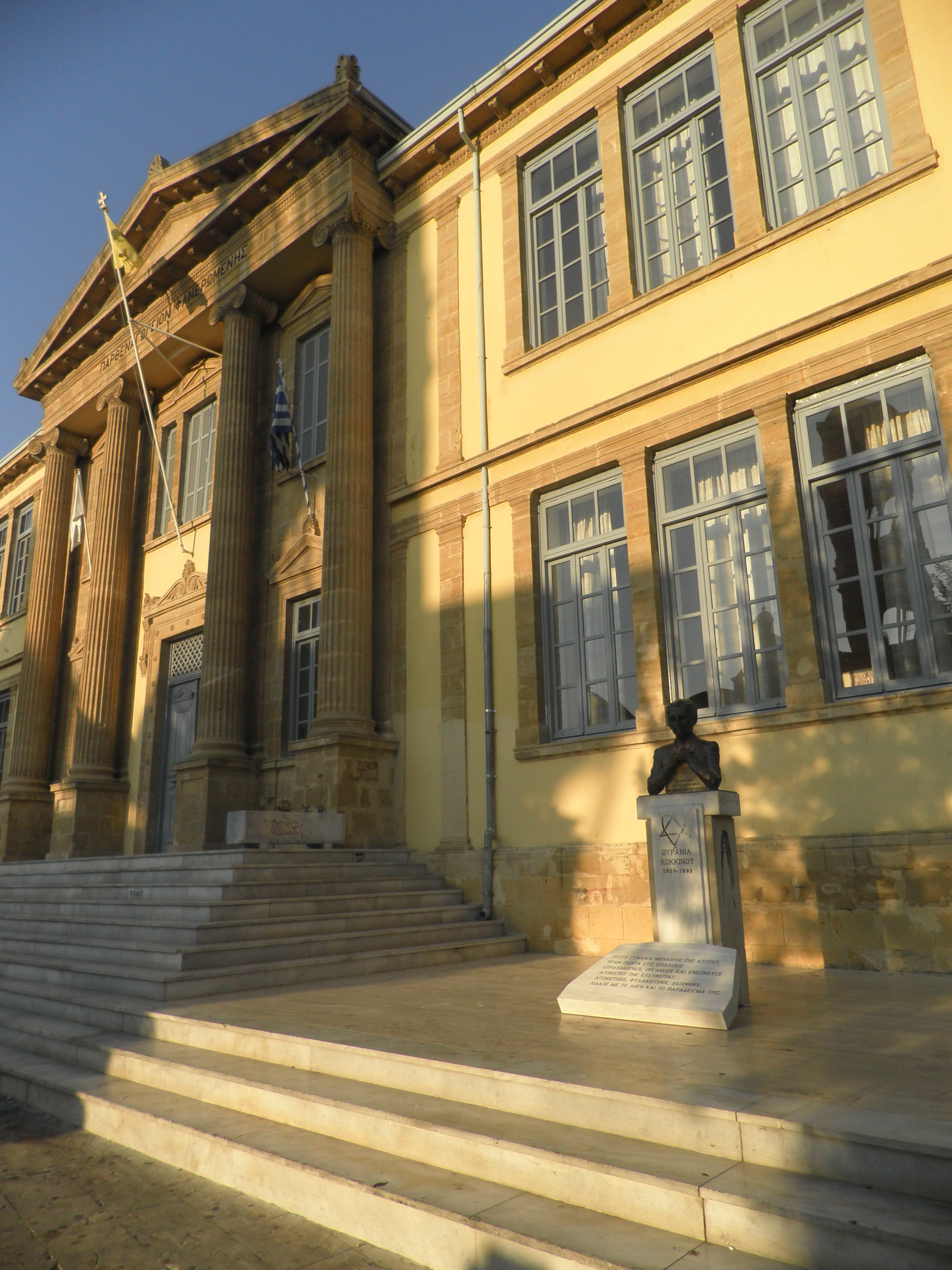
Bust of Ourania Kokkinou

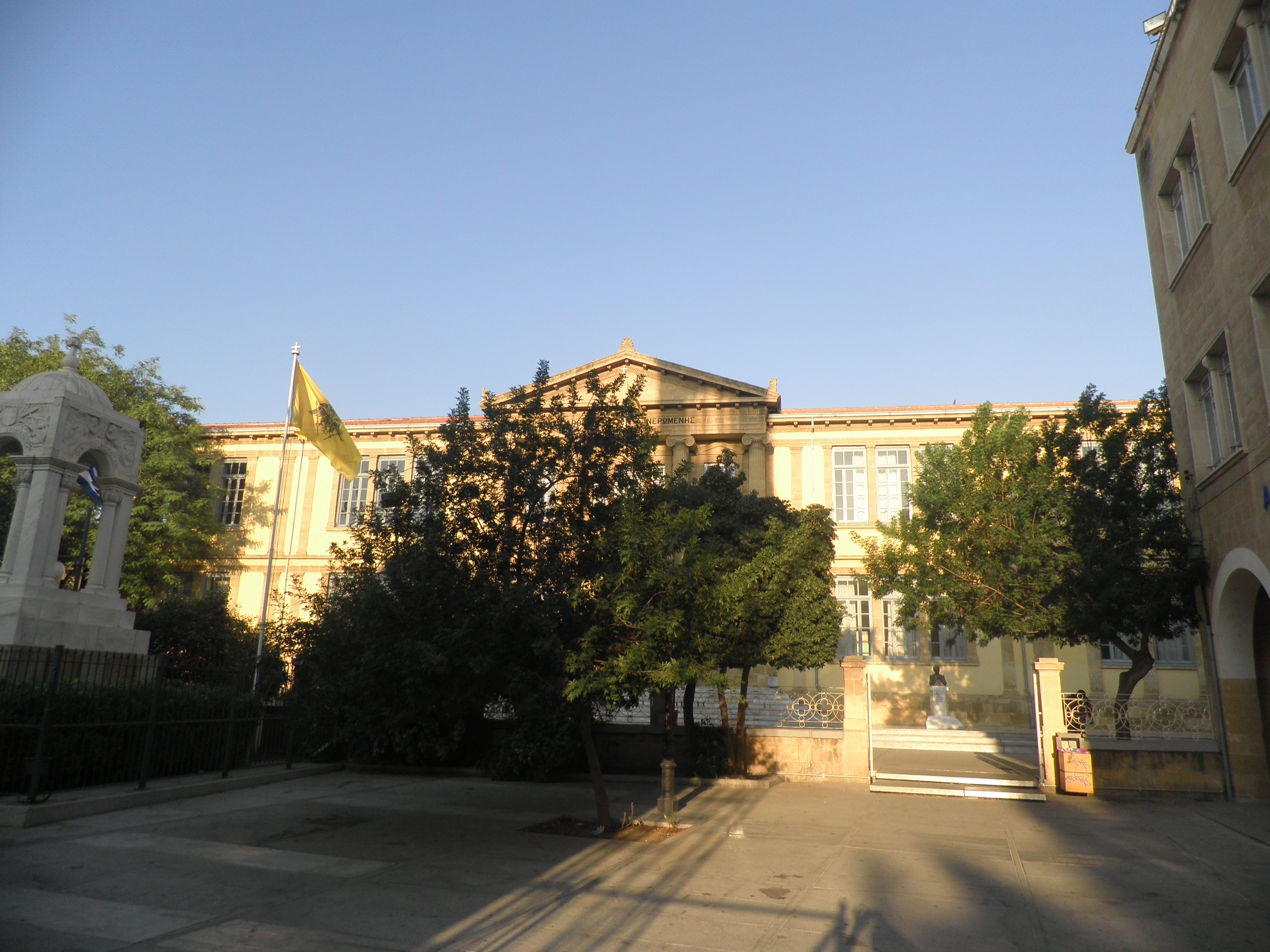
Entrance from Faneromeni Square

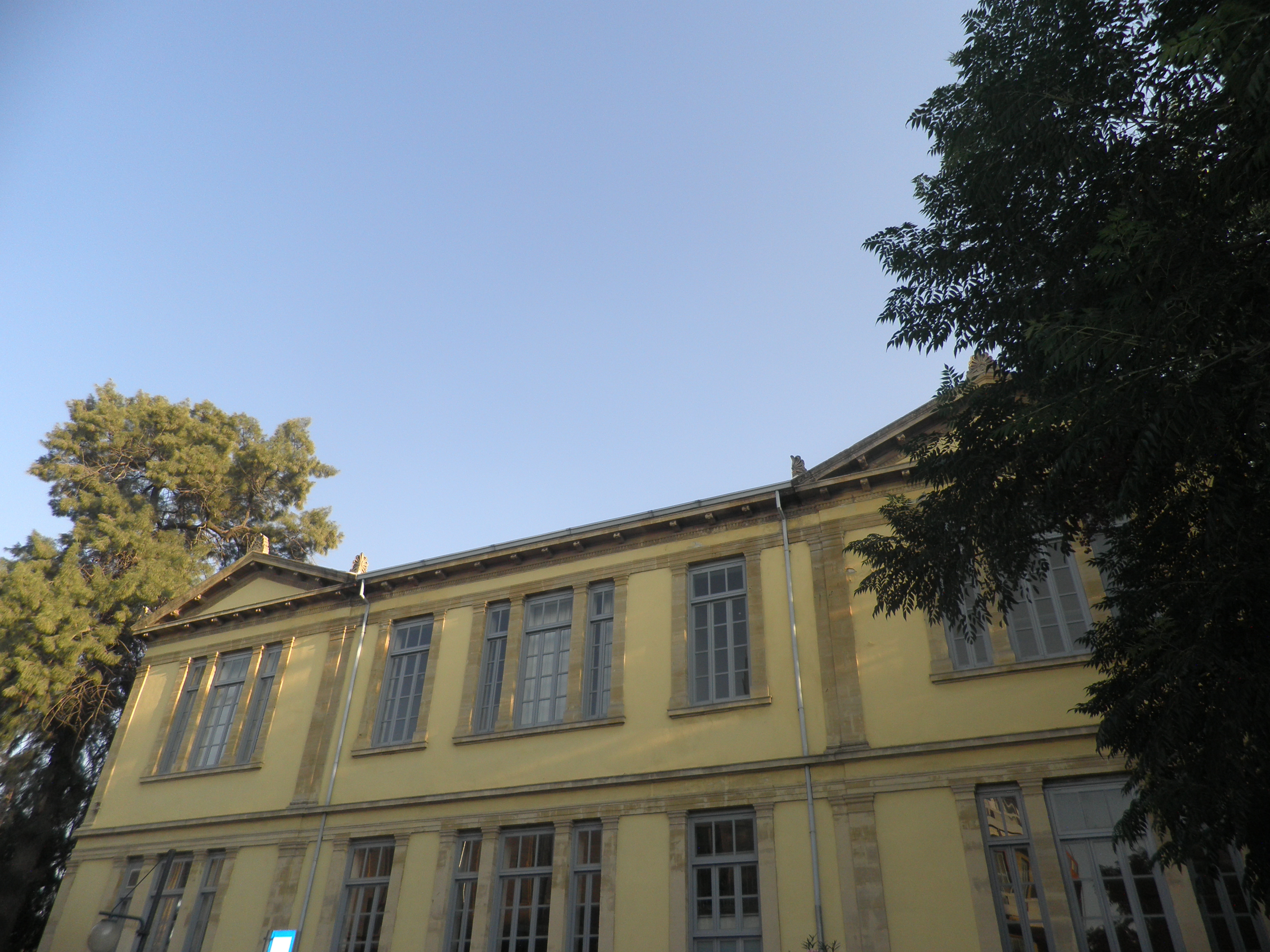
Rear of Faneromeni School Building
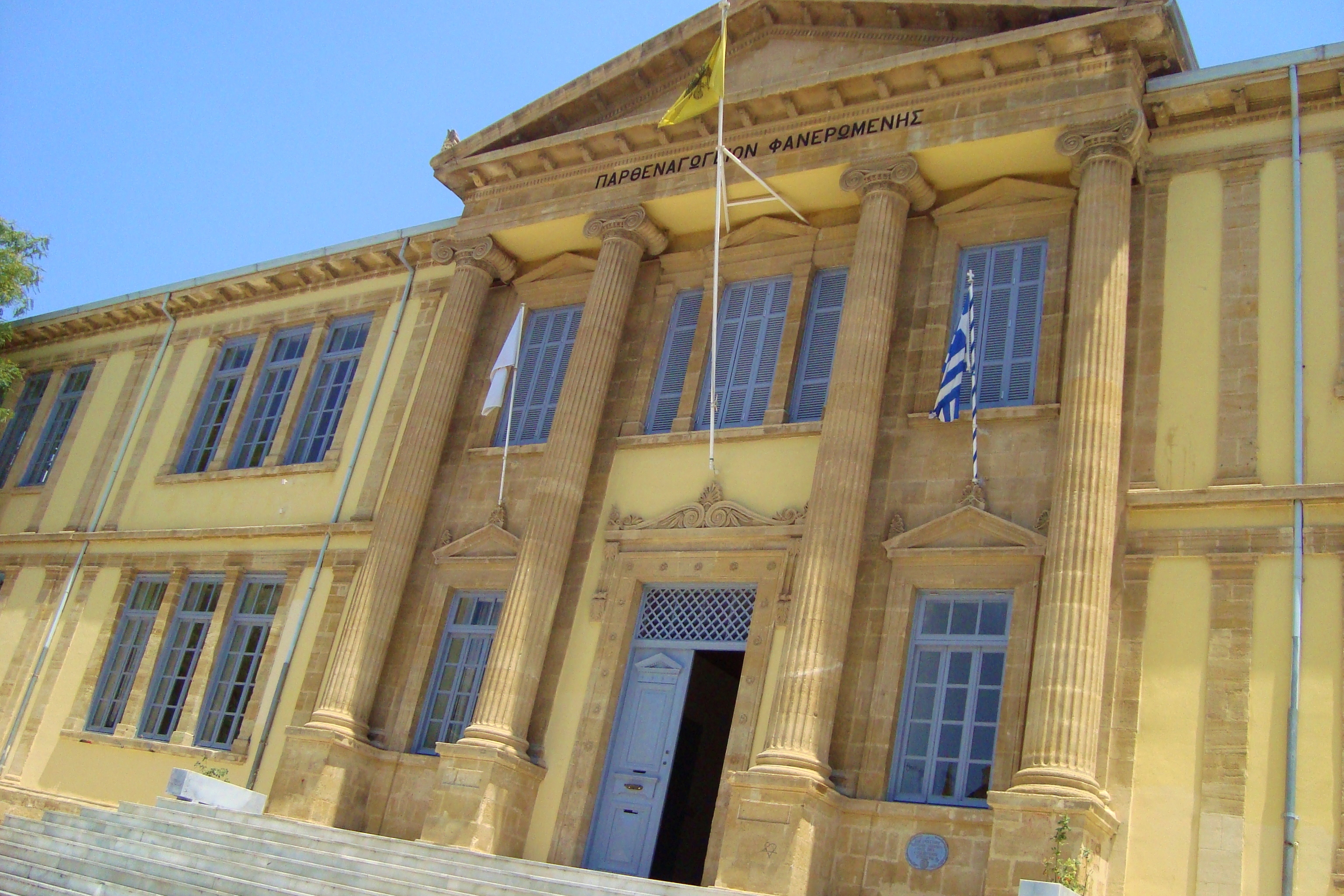
Faneromeni school entrance

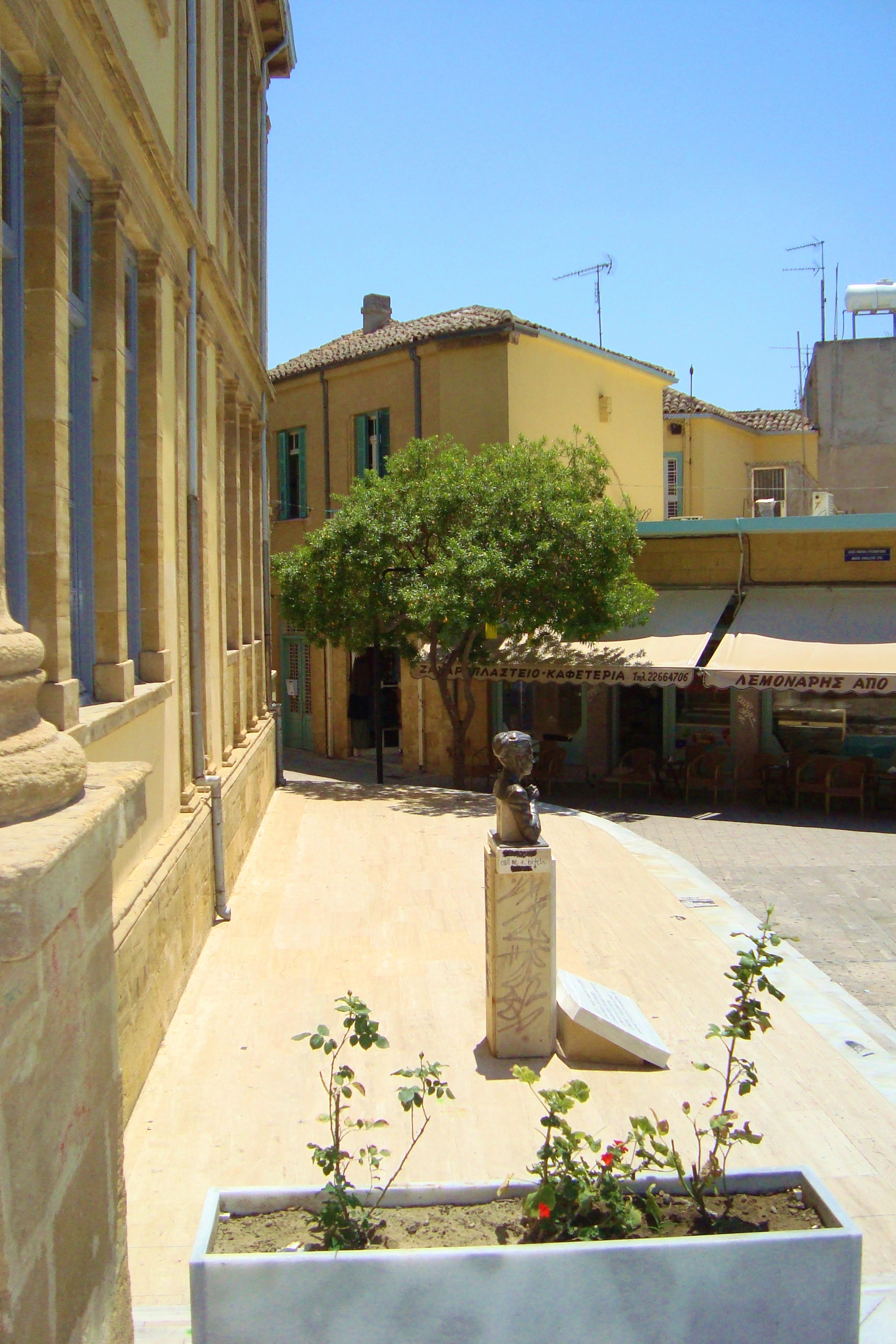
