= Elena K. Tsolakis =

Australian Greek Cypriot architect

Elena K. Tsolakis RIBA is an Australian Greek Cypriot architect. She is director of Kyriakos Tsolakis Architects. which has offices in Nicosia, Cyprus and London, England. She served on the board of the Royal Institute of British Architects (RIBA) from 2016 to 2019.

== Early life and education ==
Born in Melbourne, Tsolakis studied architecture at University of Melbourne obtaining her Bachelor of Architecture, she then went on to study in London at Kingston University for her Masters Diploma of Architecture and at University of Westminster for her Postgraduate Diploma of Architecture completing her studies in 2009.

== Notable works ==
2024: Troodos Observatory is the National Star Observatory of Cyprus, it is the first purpose-built star observatory in the country. Constructed 1,200 metres above sea level on a mountaintop within a UNESCO area the building draws inspiration from Star Wars sci-fi iconography to "inspire and excite anyone who sees it from afar or up close". Costing $1.9 million to construct, it was named the World’s Best Civic and Community Building at the prestigious World Architecture Festival Awards in 2024. The building was also chosen as the Overall Winner best building at the SHARE architecture awards in 2025 covering 25 countries. In 2026 has also won the overall winner of best public civic building at BIG SEE architecture awards covering 21 countries and won the International Architecture Award for Excellence in community architecture.

2021: Mykonos Wellness Hotel for athletes incorporates a unique site in a valley on the Greek island to fuse modern design with local materials. "These natural materials complement the vibrancy of the turquoise Bali stone pools to create a rich palette of textures and tones within a valley of boulders and undulating hills."

2016: The first women's refuge and crisis centre in Cyprus, selected for the European Union Mies van de Rohe award for Contemporary Architecture. It offers bi-communal support for women based in the Greek Cypriot and Turkish Cypriot communities. Building on 25 years of work from the local charity, the centre is a national hub for support and campaigning, recognised with a national human rights award in 2021.

== Awards, publications and exhibitions ==
- International Architecture Award for Excellence, Troodos Observatory, 2026
- BIG SEE Architecture Award, National Star Observatory Grand Prix Winner for best Public Civic building, 2026
- SHARE Architecture Awards, Overall Winner for National Star Observatory, 2025
- World Architecture Festival, winner for World's Best Civic and Community Building for National Star Observatory, 2024
- Recognised among the Top 100 World-Leading Female Architects, highlighting her exceptional talent and influence in the global architecture community
- National Star Observatory architectural model exhibited in the Royal Academy Summer Exhibition 2022
- Business Woman of the Year 2017 - Madam Figaro Cyprus
- Retropioneers: Architecture Redefined. Author of chapter 8: The Future of the Culture of Architecture
- RIBA Presidential Ambassador of Culture 2015-2017
- Architectural model exhibited in the Royal Academy Summer Exhibition 2009 and winner of the British Institution award.
