= Palazzo Bonagia =

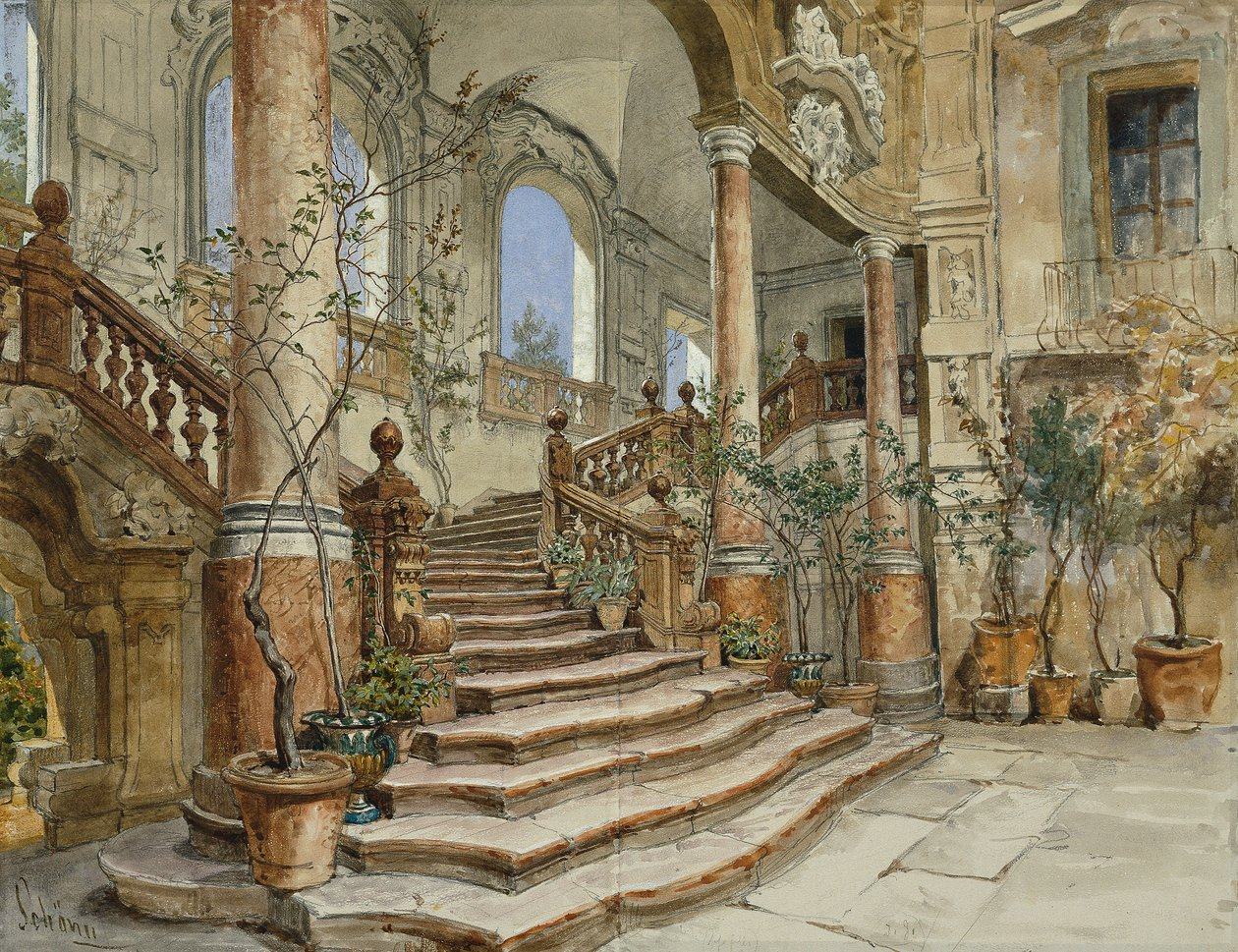
Main staircase of Palazzo Bonagia in a painting by Friedrich Alois Schuenn

The Palazzo Bonagia is a former palace located on Via Alloro in the Kalsa quarter of Palermo, region of Sicily, Italy. Aerial bombardments during World War II heavily damaged the structure, and while there have been plans for some reconstruction, as of 2020, little remains of the roofed structure and even its notable Baroque scenographic courtyard staircase remains incomplete.

A notable palace was commissioned in the mid-18th century by Antonino Stella, duke of Casteldimirto, who employed the architect Nicolò Palma. It replaced a 15th-century palace at the site. The staircase was designed circa 1755 by Andrea Giganti.
