= Chandria =

Chandria Χανδριά
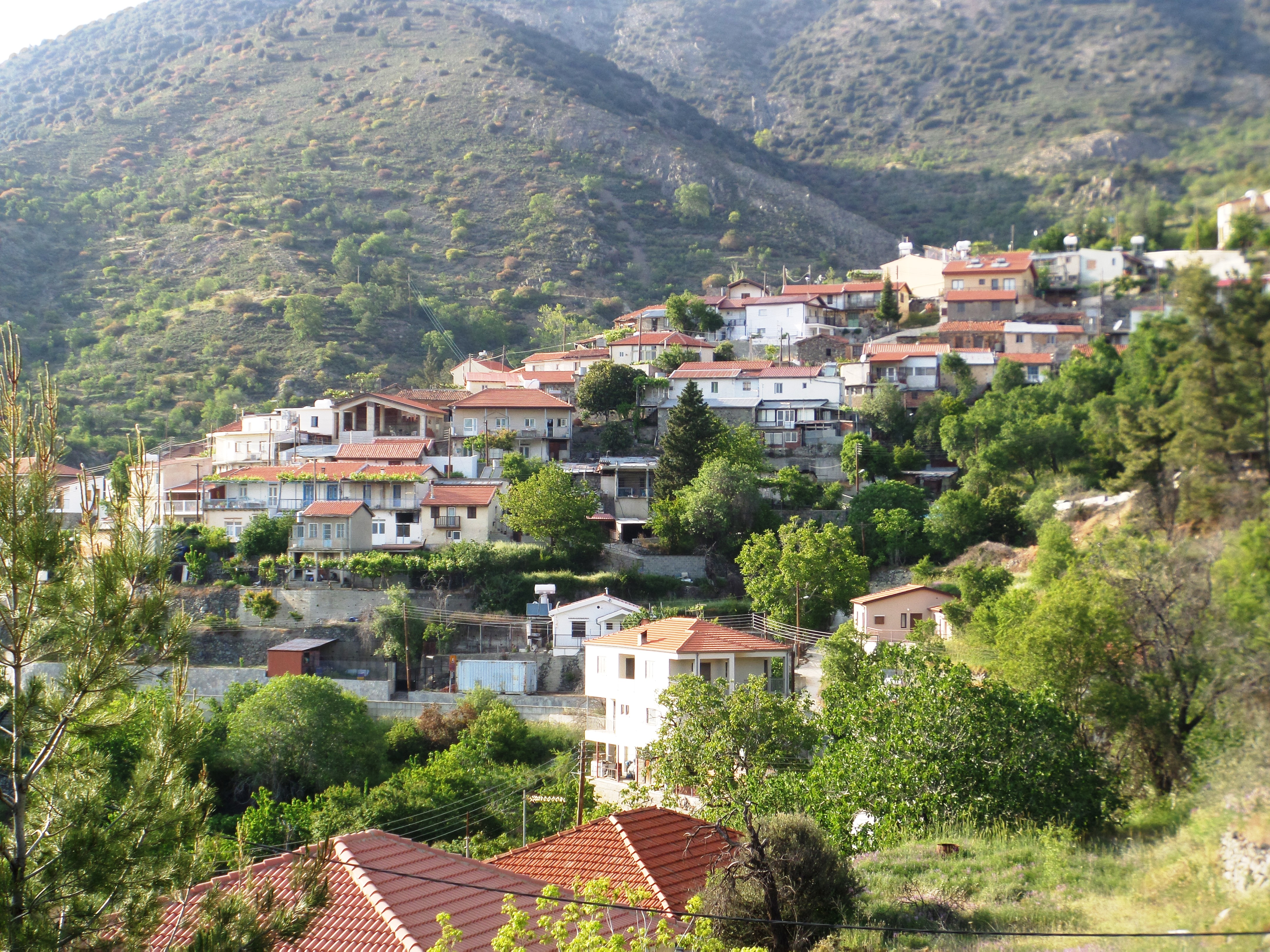

- Location in Cyprus
- Coordinates: 34°56′34″N 32°59′40″E
- Country: Cyprus
- District: Limassol District
- Elevation: 1,191 m (3,907 ft)

Population (2001)
  - Total: 205
- Time zone: UTC+2 (EET)
  - Summer (DST): UTC+3 (EEST)

Chandria (Greek: Χανδριά) is a village in Cyprus in the Limassol administrative district and belongs to the Pitsilia group of villages. At an elevation of 1,275 m (4,180 ft), it is the second highest village in Cyprus after Prodromos.

== Demographics ==
The population of the village, as estimated in late 2006, was 214. In the middle of the 20th century the population was over 1,000 with a very active primary school. The primary school today is used for camping during the summer months. The small number of children still at the village use the school at a nearby village, Kyperounta.

== Economy ==
Most inhabitants of the village are retired. Most of the economically active inhabitants are employed in agriculture and the local construction industry. A small minority are civil servants.

Villagers work in small orchards in the surrounding valleys, tending walnut, apple, pear, peach and other fruit-bearing trees. Vines and almond trees are cultivated on the slopes of the mountain.

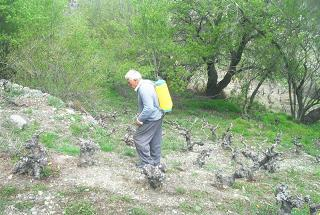

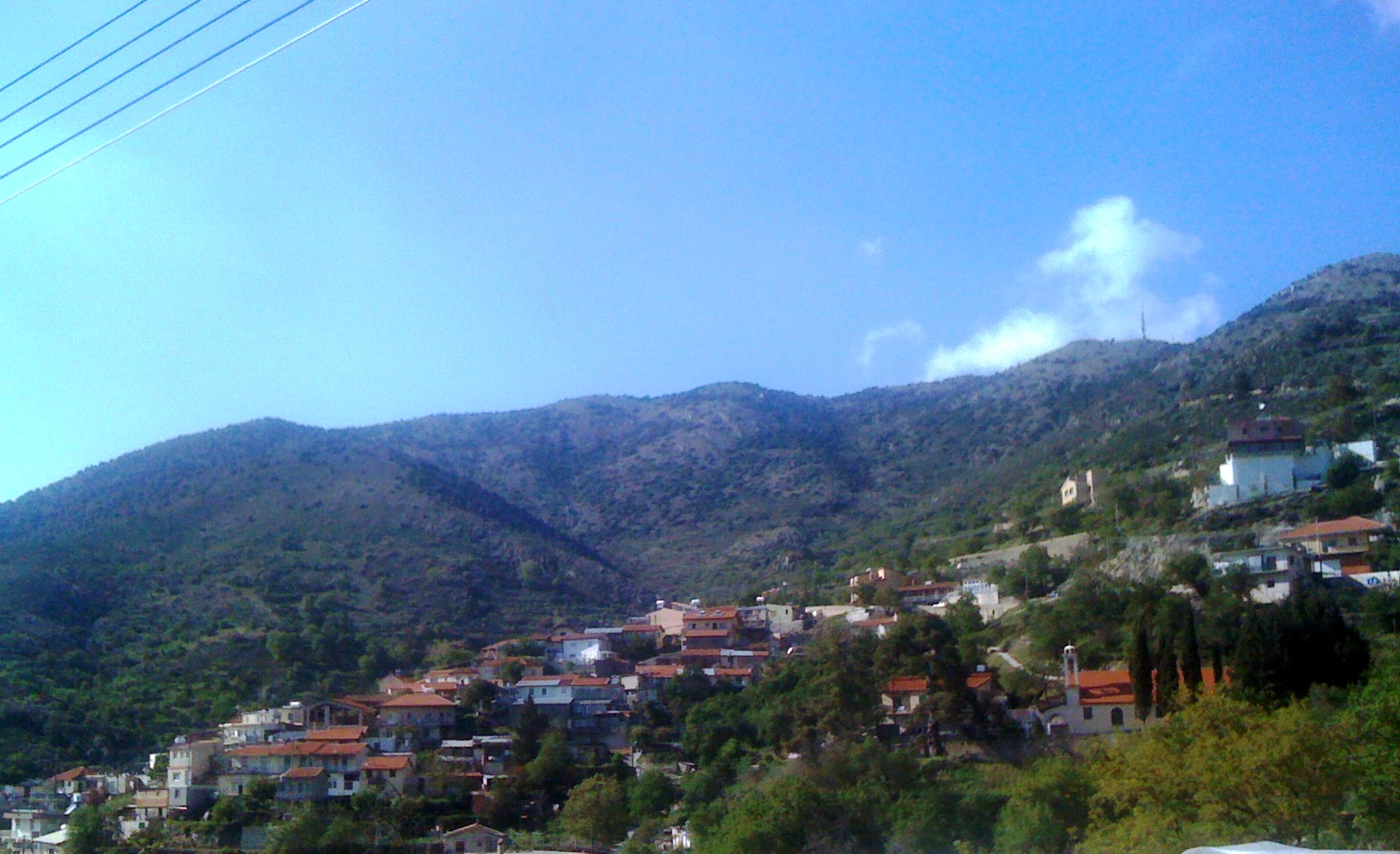
View of Chandria from the east

== History ==
According to local legend, during the Venetian period there was a large villa in the part of the village known as Grammata, which belonged to Cardinal Marcus Cornaro, nephew of Queen Caterina Cornaro. Other locations of the area like Vassiliko, Vassilitzi and Netikos indicate that the whole region was his feudal area.

The local hero of the village is Stylianos Lenas, who died in battle against the British colonial rulers during the 1955-1959 resistance. A considerable number of the village's men who took part were members of EOKA, the anti-colonial organisation, which fought for the expulsion of British troops from the island.

The local football club of the village is named after the local hero.

According to Ieronymos Peristianis, and to the testimonies of older members of the village, a communal school operated in a room of the church during the Turkish occupation of Cyprus. The teacher was a monk from Handria who left the monastery of Mesa Potamos after it closed down.

Groups of EOKA guerillas operated within the village area during 1955–59. During the historic ambush of Chandria which took place in March 1956, Christos Chartas from Polystypos was killed in action.

The inhabitants of the village are known for their dedication to national and religious traditions. In 1870 the religious Chandria inhabitants made a donation to Trooditissa Monastery of a silver-bound bible, one of the holy heirlooms of the Monastery.

== Geography and geology ==
The village is built on the south side of the Madari mountain at an altitude of 1,275m.

Tributaries of the River Limnatis traverse the village area, forming narrow troughs. One such tributary is the Zavos tributary which is used for much of the irrigation in the valleys below the village. Very little land around Handria is suitable for farming, and this has been painstakingly terraced.

=== Co-ordinates ===
UTM : VD96

=== Geographical coordinates in decimal degrees (WGS84) ===
- Latitude : 34.946
- Longitude : 32.996

The Chandria climate is refreshingly cool in summer and very cold in winter, with a fair amount of rain and snow.

The village stands at the junction linking the villages of Pitsilia that belongs to the Limassol District with those of the Nicosia district. It is two kilometres from Kyperounda, six kilometres from Agros and four kilometres from Polystypos.

There is a great interest in petrologic and structural constraints on the origin of foliated gabbro near Chandria, on the Troodos Ophiolite. Geology students frequently visit to study the intrusive igneous rocks in the road cuttings of Handria.

== Local government ==
The President of the community or mouktaris is Mr. Charilaos Socratous.
