= Jakobstad Church =

Church in Jakobstad, Finland

- Swedish: Jakobstads kyrka; Finnish: Pietarsaaren kirkko
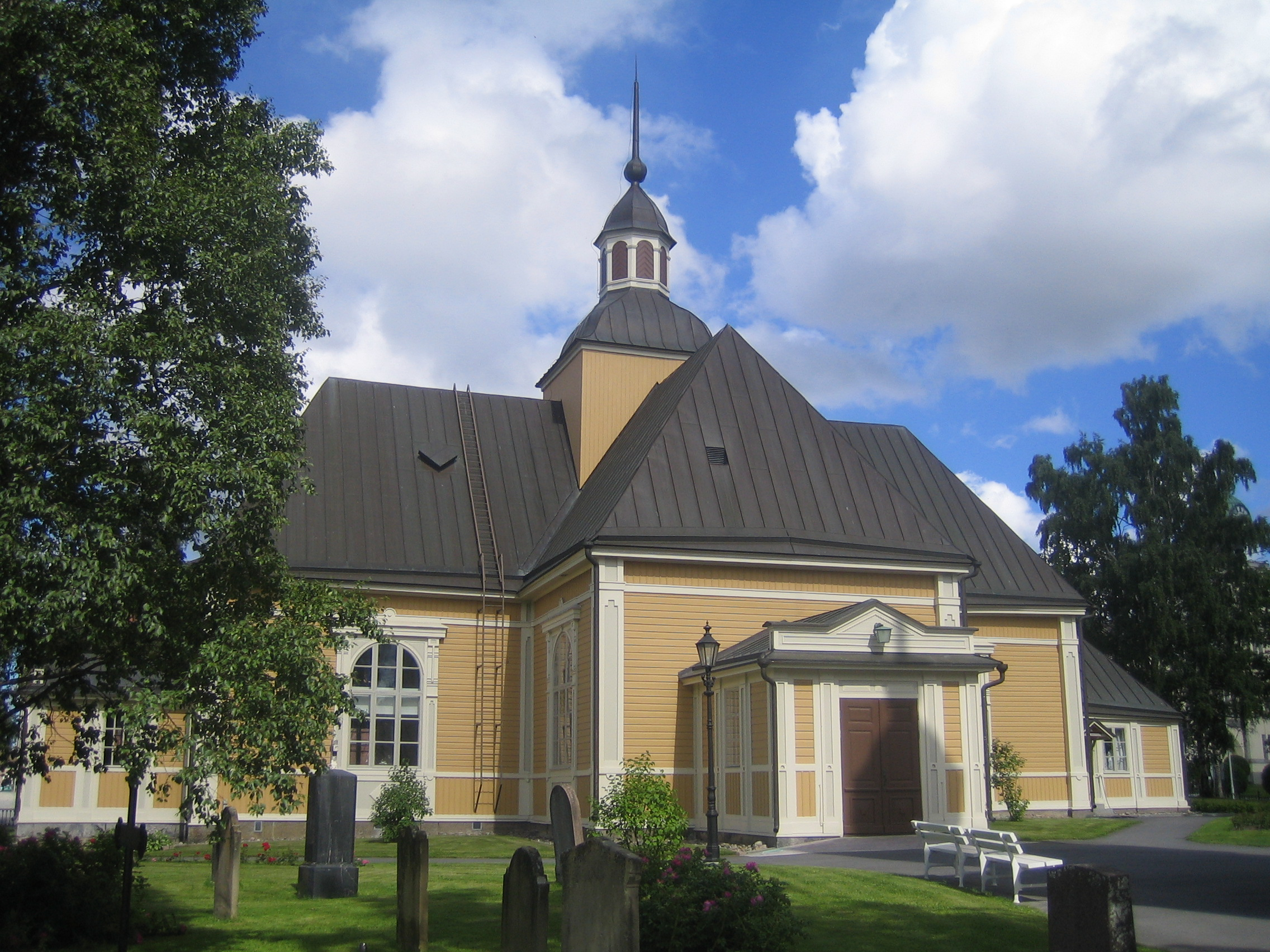
- Jakobstad Church in 2005
- Jakobstad Church
- 63°40′37″N 022°42′13″E
- Country: Finland
- Denomination: Lutheran

Architecture
- Architect: Johan Knubb
- Completed: 1731; 295 years ago

Jakobstad Church (Swedish: Jakobstads kyrka, Finnish: Pietarsaaren kirkko) is a Lutheran church in the city of Jakobstad, Finland. It was constructed in 1731 by Johan Knubb. The church has been built on the same place, where the first church in Jakobstad was located before it was burned down by Russians in 1714 during the Great Wrath.

The altar piece was painted in 1784 by Frans Gabriel Westerberg from Stockholm.

The church is built of wood in the shape of a like sided cross. It is one of the first churches in Finland built like a cross. The brass chandeliers from the 1660s were saved from the Russians. The exceptional big menorah was donated in 1709 by the municipal counselor Niclas Wendelius. There is also an old Timpani from the 1840 century donated by the Commercial counselor Adolph Lindskog. The belltower of Ostrobothnian style was erected by Henrik Thomasson Kattil 1742. He was born in the Jörala village in Vörå. There are two church bells from the 1690 century.

== Congregations ==
There are two lutheran congregations in the city using the same church. The Swedish-speaking Jakobstads svenska församling (Jakobstad's Swedish congregation) and the Finnish-speaking Pietarsaaren suomalainen seurakunta (Jakobstad's Finnish Congregation).
