= Makarios I of Cyprus =

Archbishop of Cyprus from 1854 to 1865

His Beatitude Makarios I
- Archbishop of Cyprus
- Church: Orthodox Church of Cyprus
- Installed: 26 August 1854
- Predecessor: Kyrillos I
- Successor: Sophronios III

Personal details
- Born: Prodromos
- Died: 4 August 1865 Nicosia

Makarios I (Greek: Αρχιεπίσκοπος Μακάριος Α΄) was Archbishop of Cyprus from 1854 until 1865.

== Biography ==
He was born in the village of Prodromos, Ottoman Cyprus, and his original surname was Christodoulides (Greek: Χριστοδουλίδης).

He started his religious studies at Trooditissa Monastery and was later transferred to Kykkos Monastery. He was ordained deacon in 1823, two years after the Greek Revolution and the massacres of 9 July. He served as deacon in Paphos diocese, later he served as deacon to Archbishop of Cyprus Panaretos and subsequent Archbishops, Ioannikios and Kyrillos I.

He was ordained Archbishop on 26 August 1854 succeeding Kyrillos I who had died a month earlier.

For his days, thanks to the Ottoman Reform Edict of 1856, he managed to rise and sound the bell for the first time in the Turkish-occupied Nicosia, in the cathedral of St. John. He made sure that the religious duties of the clergy were guaranteed, while he was the first Archbishop to gain the right to participate in the general board of the island. He repaired the Archbishop's building (1862–1863), rebuilt the Grand Synod and completed the final picture of the Archbishop's building complex until the changes that took place in the past century.

Makarios was instrumental in the establishment of many schools throughout rural Cyprus to combat illiteracy. In 1857 he founded the Faneromeni School, the first school for girls on the island. He also sought to have the tax burden eased by written requests to Kâmil Pasha the Grand Vizier in Constantinople who was himself a Cypriot.

Makarios died in Nicosia on 4 August 1865 from cholera, after refusing to leave the city when an epidemic broke out.
