= Andrea Giganti =

Italian architect

Andrea Giganti (18 September 1731 – 4 November 1787) was an Italian architect of the Sicilian Baroque era. He was born in Trapani in 1731. In his youth, he studied architecture under Giovanni Biagio Amico (1684–1754). Around 1751, Giganti came under the patronage of Giuseppe Stella, Bishop of Mazara del Vallo, with whom he went to Palermo, where he studied for the priesthood and was ordained.

After ordination, he entered the household of the Sicilian aristocrat the Prince of Scordia, where he seems to have been employed as both confessor and private architect, working on the various houses owned by the Scordia family.

Giganti designed other Sicilian buildings in the baroque style, including: Villa Galetti at Bagheria, Villa Ventimiglia, at Mezzo-Monreale, the church of S. Paolo dei Giardinieri, and the dais and high altar at the church of San Salvatore in Palermo. He designed the staircase for the Palazzo Bonagia in Palermo.

A trained engineer, Giganti was also responsible for a number of bridges. Towards the end of his life, he began to forsake the baroque style in favour of a more simple neoclassical style.
