= Trooditissa Monastery =

Monastery on the Troodos Mountains, Cyprus

Trooditissa
- Τροοδίτισσα
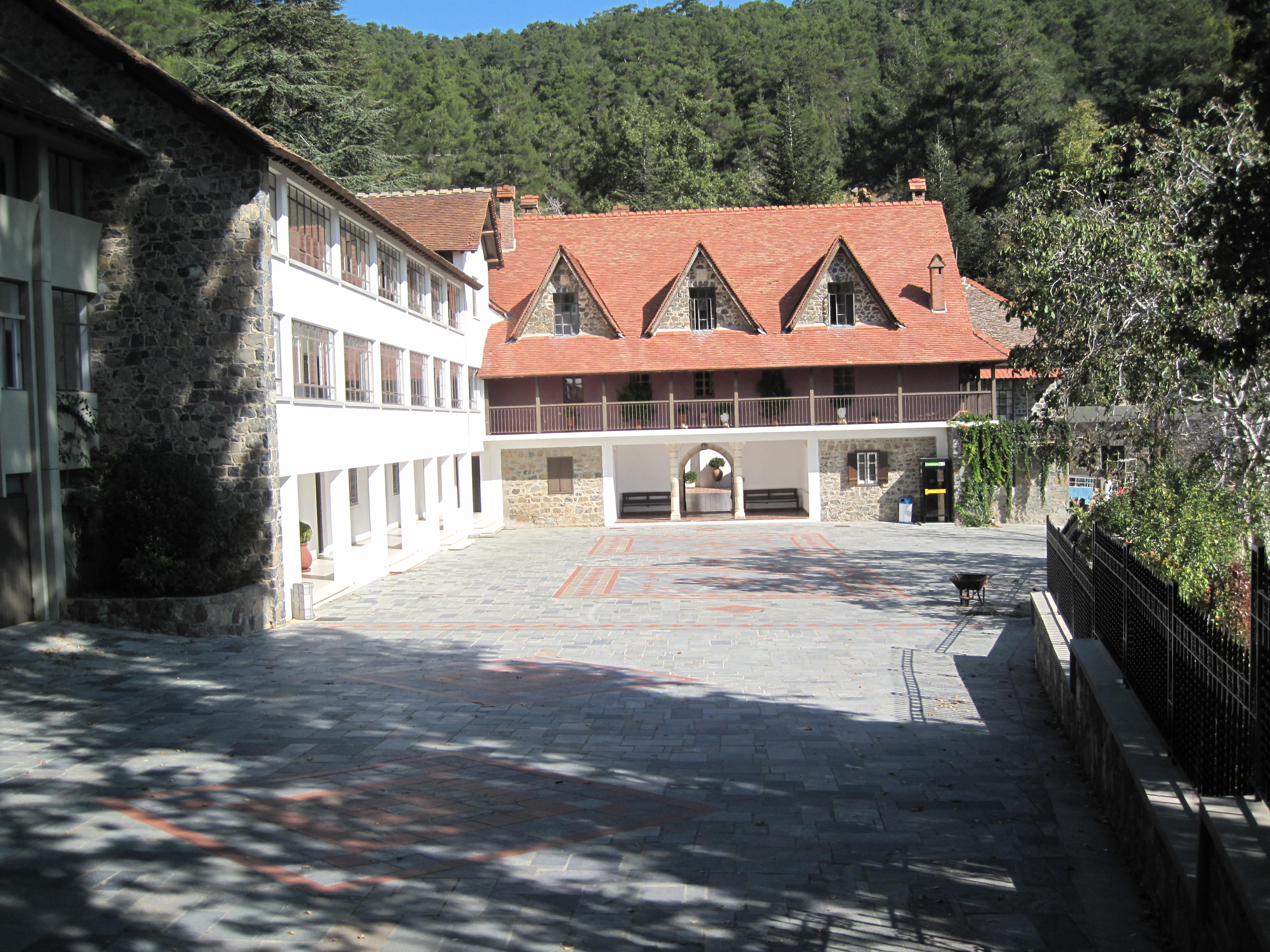
- Trooditissa Monastery

- Location within Cyprus
- Interactive map of Trooditissa

Monastery information
- Full name: Holy Monastery of Trooditissa
- Order: Orthodox monasticism
- Established: 990
- Dedication: Virgin Mary
- Celebration: August 15
- Diocese: Church of Cyprus

People
- Prior: Archimandrite Athanasios

Architecture
- Style: Byzantine

Site
- Location: Troodos Mountains, Paphos District
- Country: Cyprus
- Coordinates: 34.9129°N 32.8383°E

Trooditissa Monastery, (Greek: Τροοδίτισσα) is situated on the southern slopes of the Troodos Mountains on the island of Cyprus. It is an Orthodox monastery dedicated to the Virgin Mary.

It was founded in 990, but the current building dates back to 1731. It is built at an altitude of 1,300m (4,265 feet) and the closest village is Platres.

The Holy Monastery of Trooditissa is estimated to have been founded after the period of iconoclasm. The earlier buildings, which were of the middle Byzantine period (12th century) are not saved. The main church and the other surrounding buildings were built in the 18th-20th centuries.

The most important relic of the monastery is the thaumaturgist (miracle-working) icon of the Virgin Mary, originally from Asia Minor and is known for its wonders to childless married couples who wish to have a child. The church celebrates on 15 August, during the feast of the Assumption.
