= Trypiotis =

- Trypiotis
- Location in Cyprus
- Coordinates: 35°10′27″N 33°21′35″E
- Country: Cyprus
- District: Nicosia District
- Municipality: Nicosia

Population (2011)
  - Total: 2,158
- Time zone: UTC+2 (EET)
  - Summer (DST): UTC+3 (EEST)

Trypiotis is an historic neighbourhood, quarter, Mahalla, or parish of central Nicosia, Cyprus.

The church of this quarter, that of Archangel Michael, is one of the principal buildings of Nicosia and is the oldest church in Nicosia, amongst the churches now existing as such. Α marble inscription high above the main door indicates that the church dates from 1695, when the foundation stone of the church was laid by the Archbishop of Cyprus Germanos II on May 3 that year.

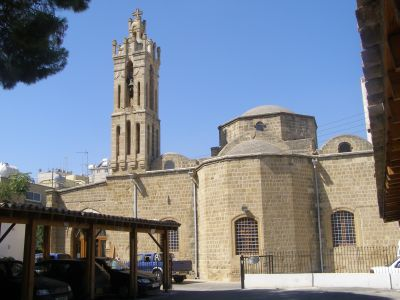
Church of Archangel Michael of Trypiotis

The name "Trypiotis" derives from a miracle reputedly performed in Phrygia by the Archangel Michael, to whom the church is dedicated. A diverted river threatened a church, but was saved when the archangel caused the river water to be swallowed up by a hole - "tripa (τρύπα)" in Greek.

== Location ==
The quarter is situated partly within the old city of Nicosia inside the walls and partly without.

The quarter contains the southern end of Ledra Street where it meets the Walls of Nicosia. In 1882 a new passageway was made through the walls, to supplement the existing openings at Paphos, Famagusta and Kyrenia Gates.This was called the Hajisavvas Opening and it included a wooden bridge crossing the "moat" to take a road southwards towards the government buildings. This bridge was later replaced with a solid concrete one. The open area on the bridge was named Metaxas Square, after the Greek Prime Minister Ioannis Metaxas, but was renamed Eleftheria (Freedom) Square in 1974, following a competition instigated by the Mayor of Nicosia. This square (now renovated) connects the old quarter with the new part of the quarter outside the wall, which encompasses the important shopping streets of Nicosia, the prestigious Stasikratous Street, Themistokli Dervi Avenue and Makariou Avenue. Nicosia town hall is located on the D’Avila bastion of the walls and overlooks Eleftheria square.

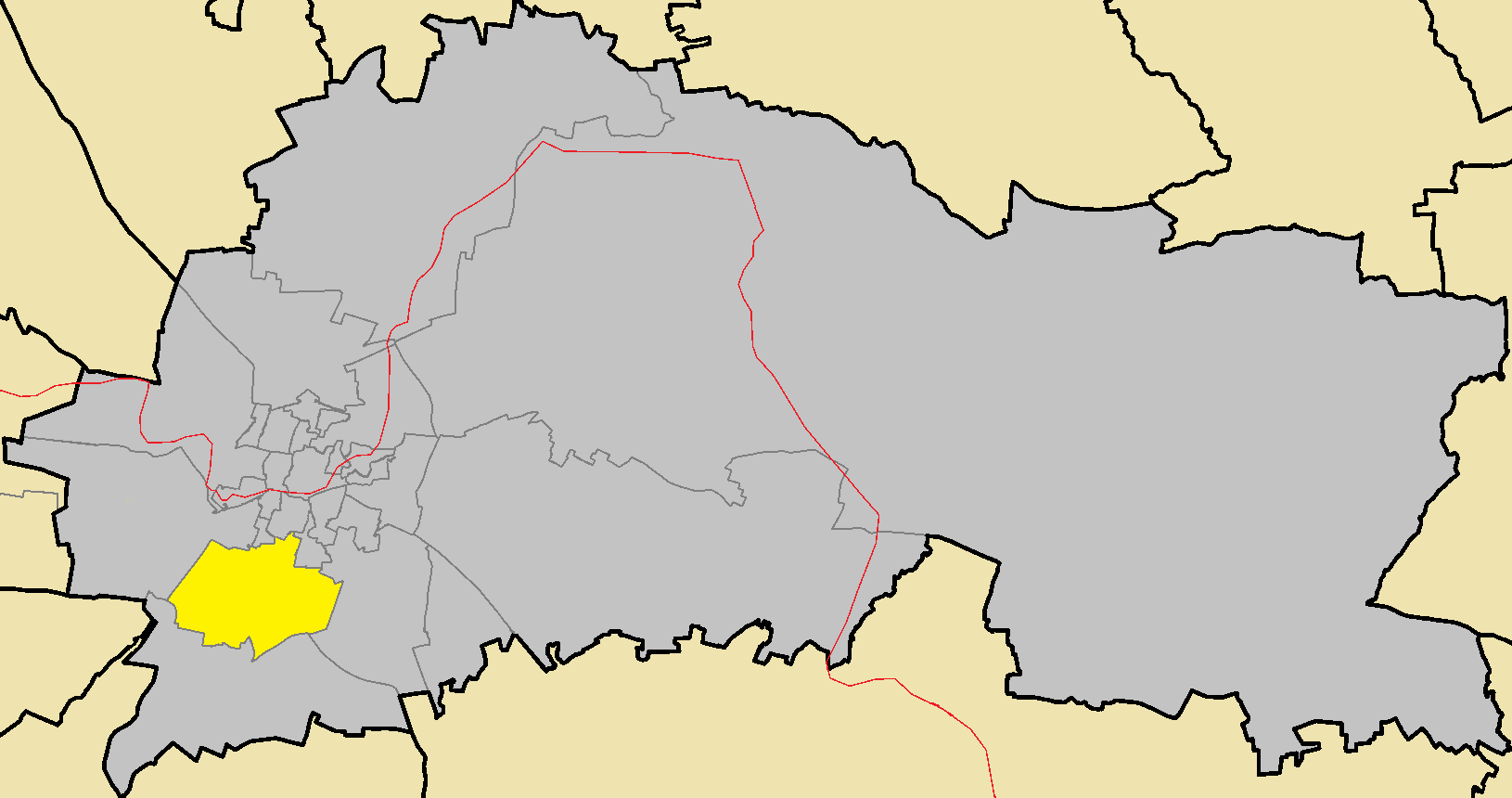
Location of Trypiotis neighbourhood within Nicosia municipal area

== Demographics ==
At the last census, conducted in 2011, Trypiotis had a population of 2,158, an increase from its population of 1,986 in 2001 but a decrease from 2,250 in 1992.

== History ==
Trypiotis is one of 24 historic neighbourhoods within the walls of Nicosia.

During the Ottoman period Trypiotis was counted as one of the Orthodox quarters of Nicosia. It was also known as Bash Mahallah (Mahalle-i Baş), meaning great quarter.

In the 1831 census of the Ottoman Empire Trypiotis has a population of 439 males (over age 15) out of 5,292 in Nicosia.

The population of Trypiotis at subsequent censuses was as follows:

Date	Population	% Greek Cyp.
1881	1057	
1891	1031	99%
1901	1206	99%
1911	1623	99%
1921	1269	99%
1931	2234	99%
1946	3247	99%
1960		
1982	3227	
1991	2250	
2001	1986	
2011	2158	
