= Spyrou Kyprianou Avenue =

Street in Nicosia, Cyprus

Spyrou Kyprianou Avenue (Greek: Λεωφόρος Σπύρου Κυπριανού, Turkish: Spiru Kiprianu Caddesi), is an important avenue located in the centre of Nicosia, Cyprus formerly known as Santa Rosa Avenue.

The Avenue was named after Spyros Kyprianou (Greek: Σπύρος Κυπριανού), a former president of the Republic of Cyprus. It intersects Makariou Anevue and it hosts a number of highrises, banks and financial and corporate service companies.

The Headquarters of the Electricity Authority of Cyprus (Greek: Αρχή Ηλεκτρισμού Κύπρου), lie on the left-hand side of the Avenue and behind Stasikratous Street.

The avenue is one of the key nightlife districts in Nicosia, having numerous cafeterias, bars, clubs and restaurants

== Photogallery ==
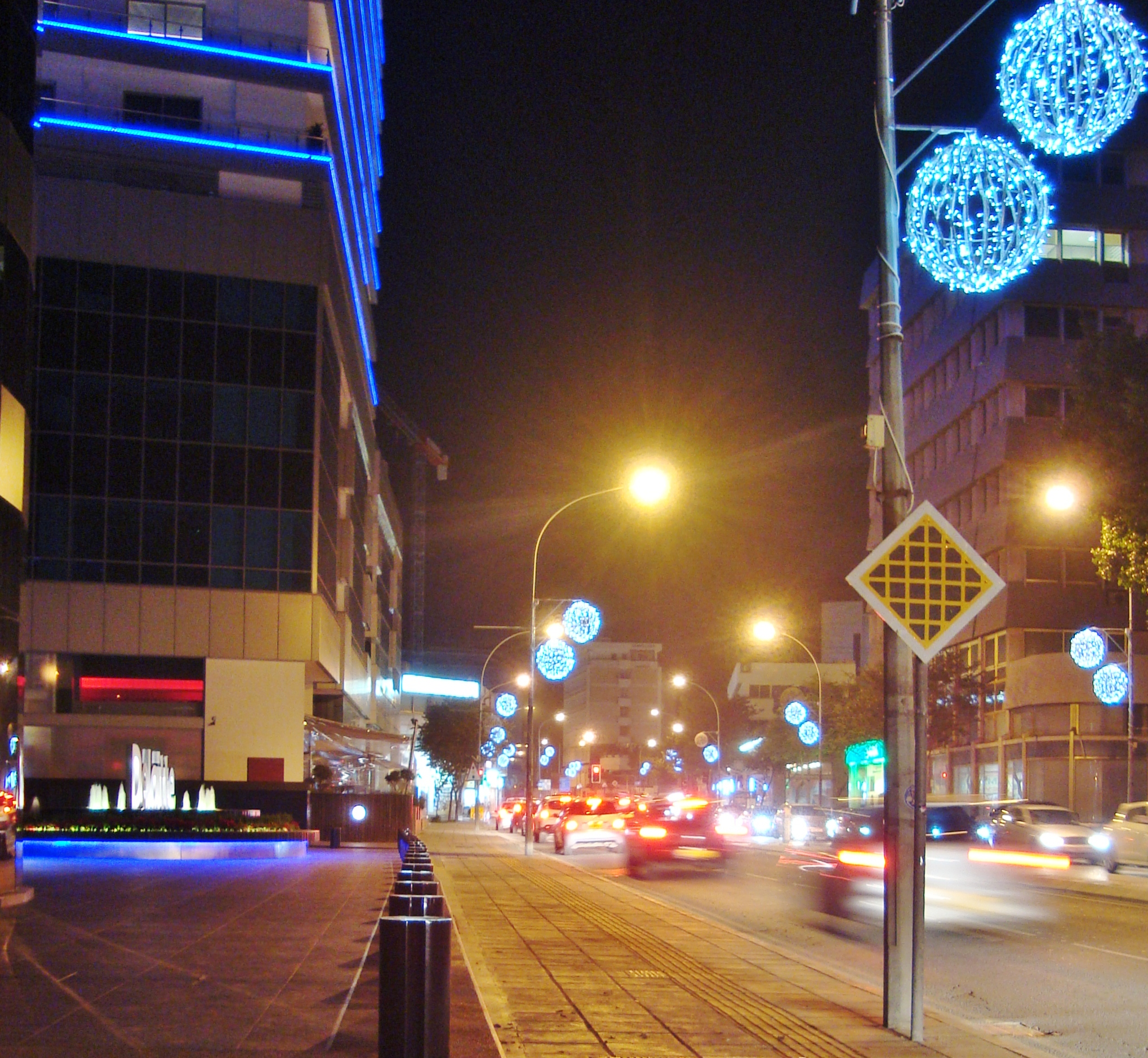
Highrises in Spyrou Kyprianou Avenue at night

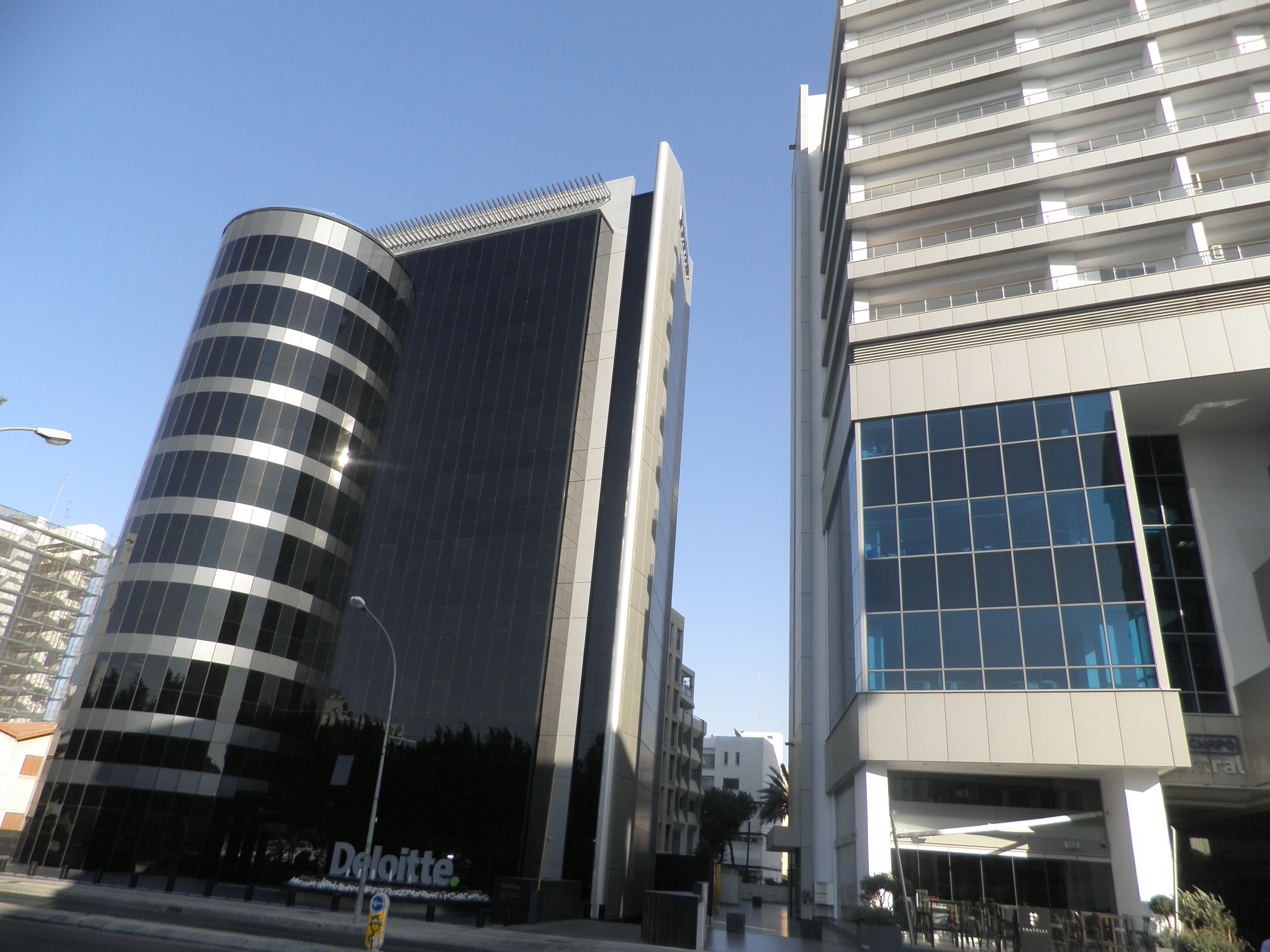
Highrises in Spyrou Kyprianou Avenue

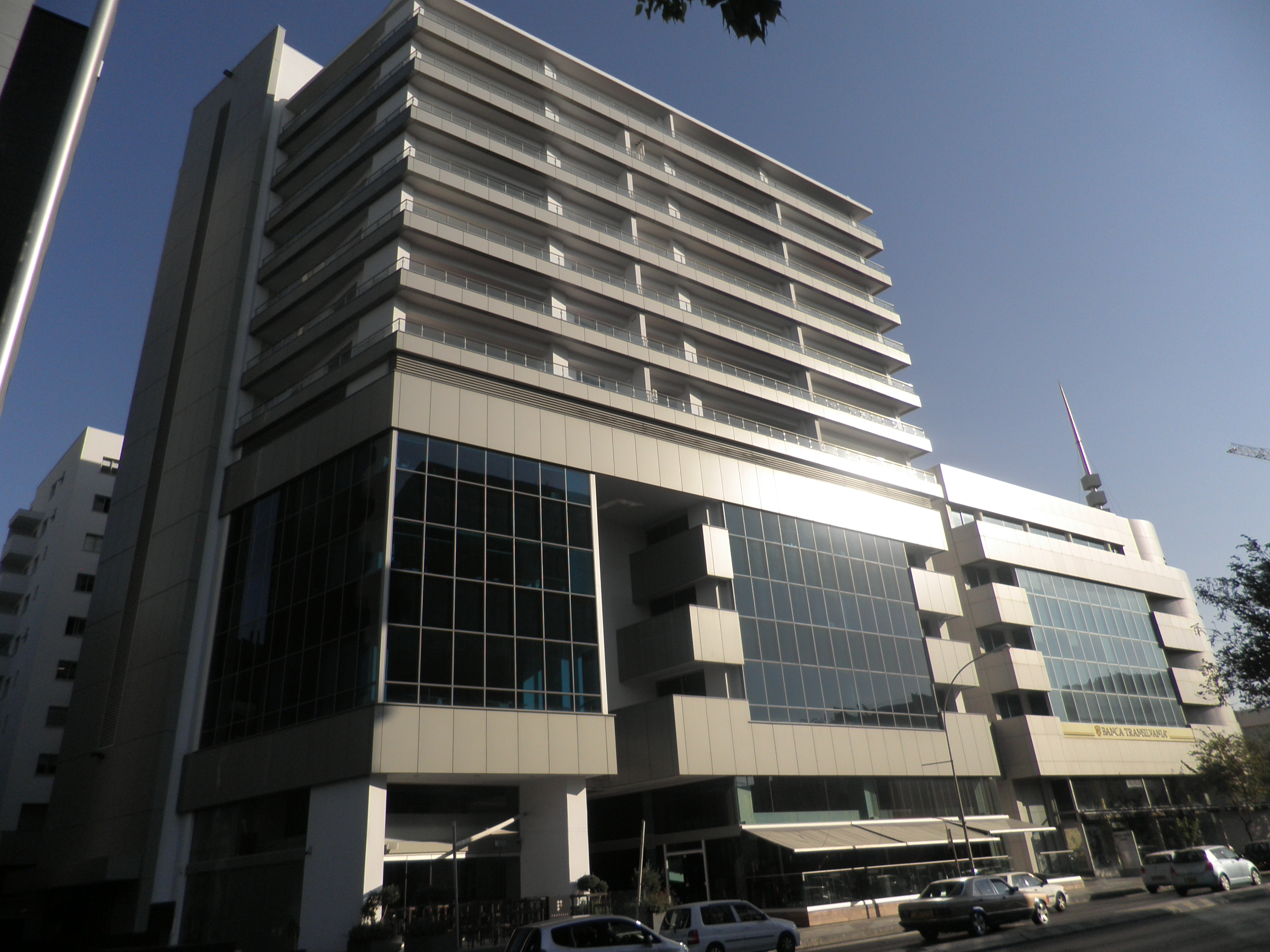
Spyrou Kyprianou Avenue

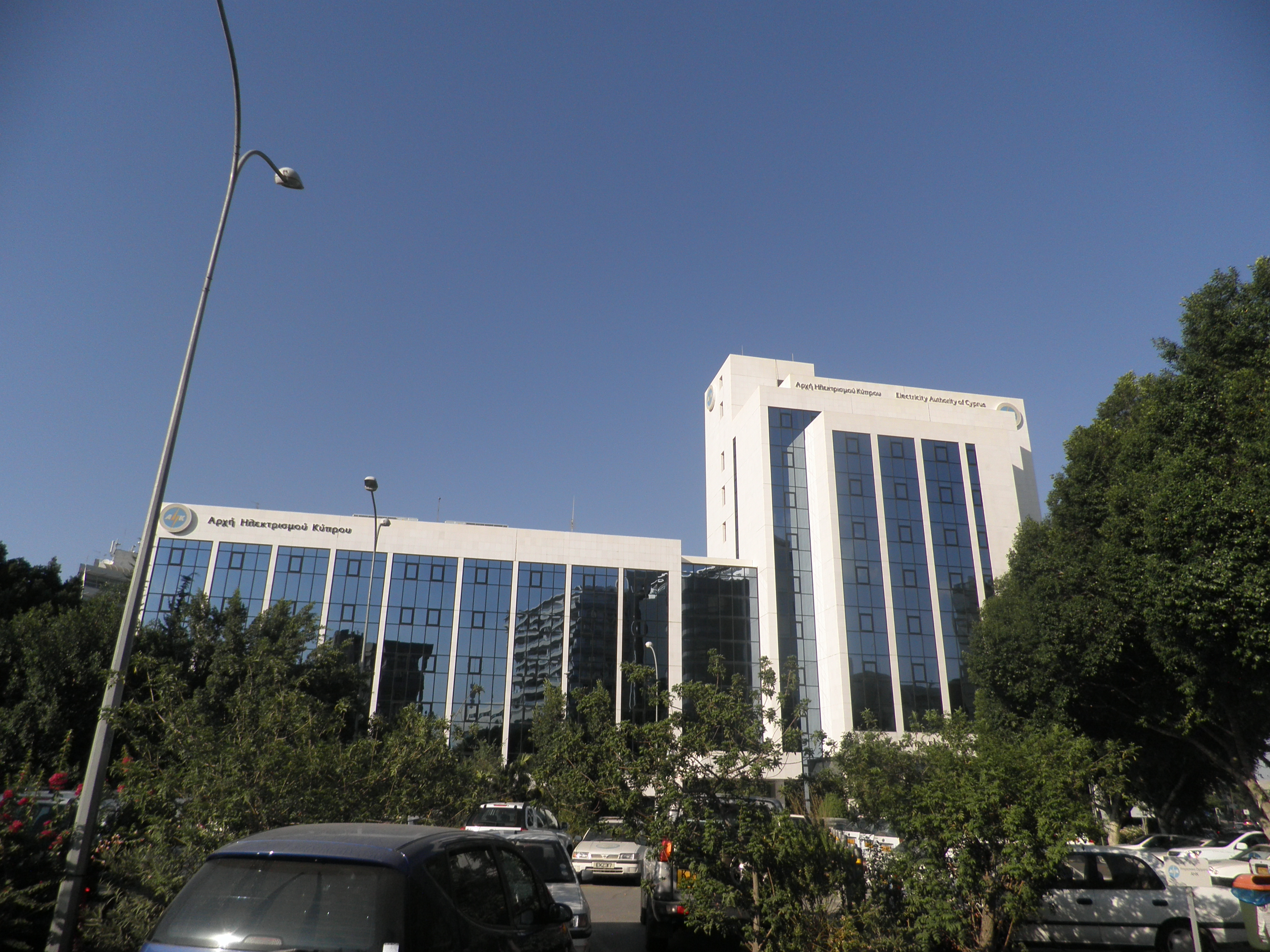
Cyprus Electricity Authority, Spyrou Kyprianou Avenue

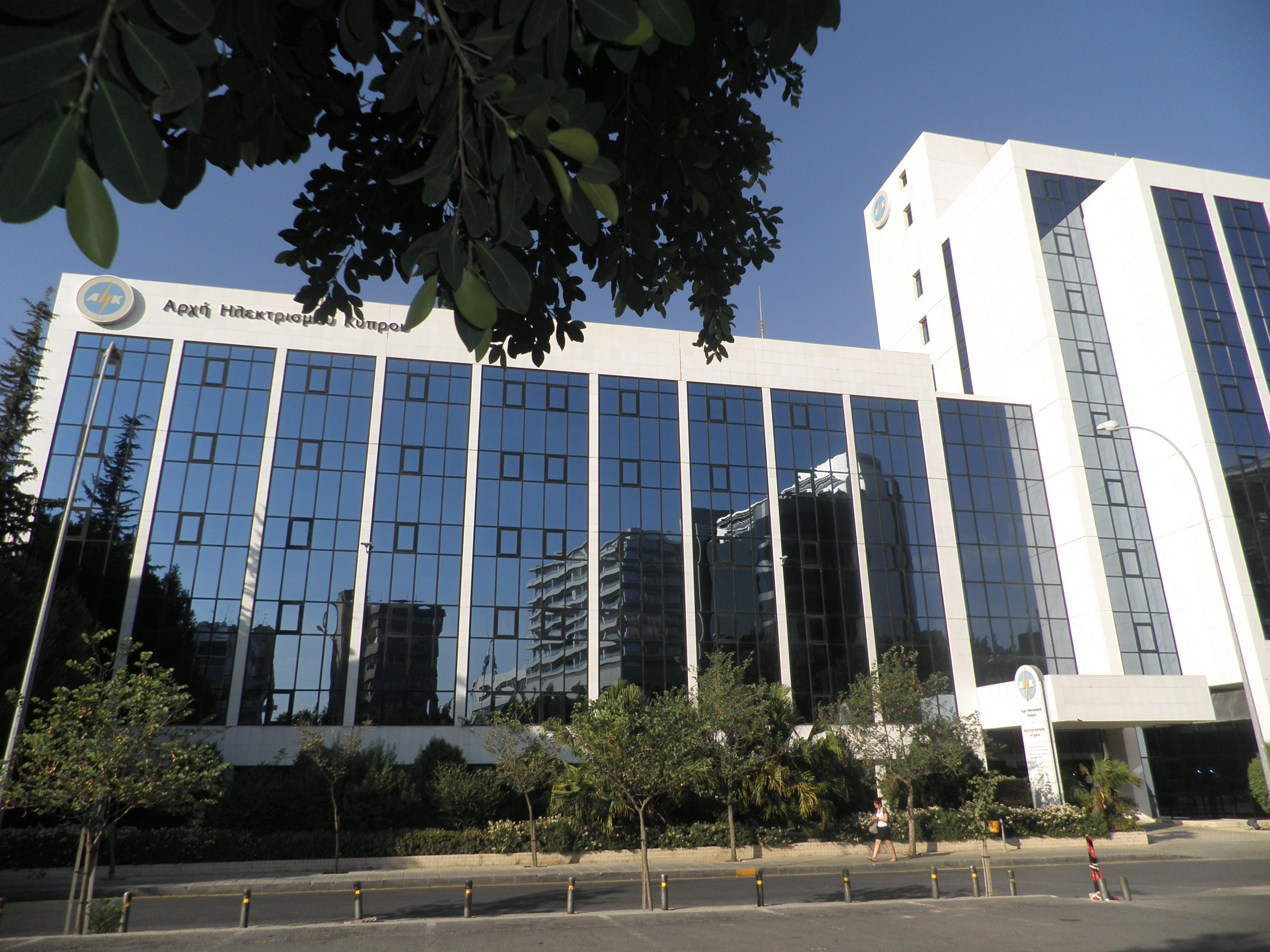
Cyprus Electricity Authority, Spyrou Kyprianou Avenue
