= Reginos =

Greek saint, bishop, and martyr

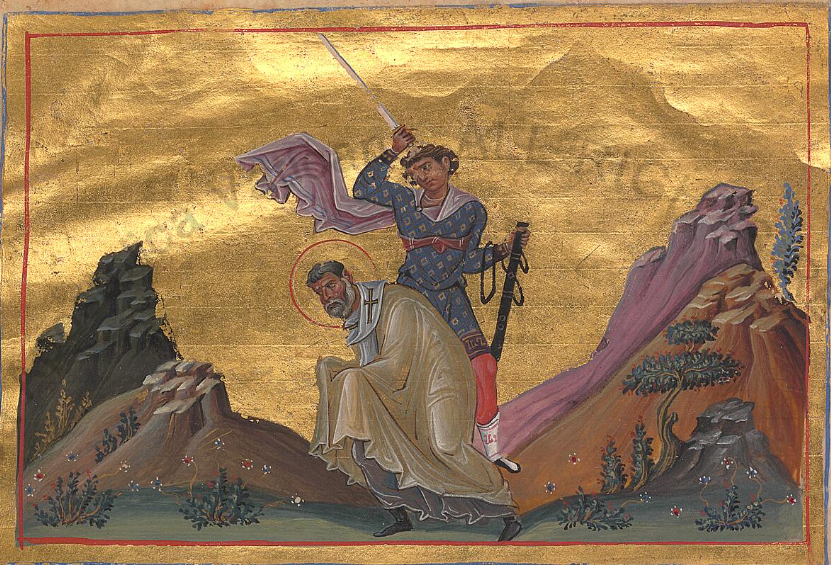
Icon of Reginos of Skopelos in the Menologion of Basil II

Saint Riginos is the patron saint of the island of Skopelos, Greece. His feast day, February 25, is a local holiday on the island. Christian tradition states that he was a bishop who was tortured to death in 362 AD.

Part of his remains are kept in a local church, but most of the relics stay in the Archangel Michael Trypiotis Church in Nicosia, Cyprus.

In Skopelos there is a monastery bearing his name, Monastery of Saint Riginos.
