= Makariou Avenue, Nicosia =

Shopping street in Nicosia, the capital city of Cyprus

Makarios Avenue
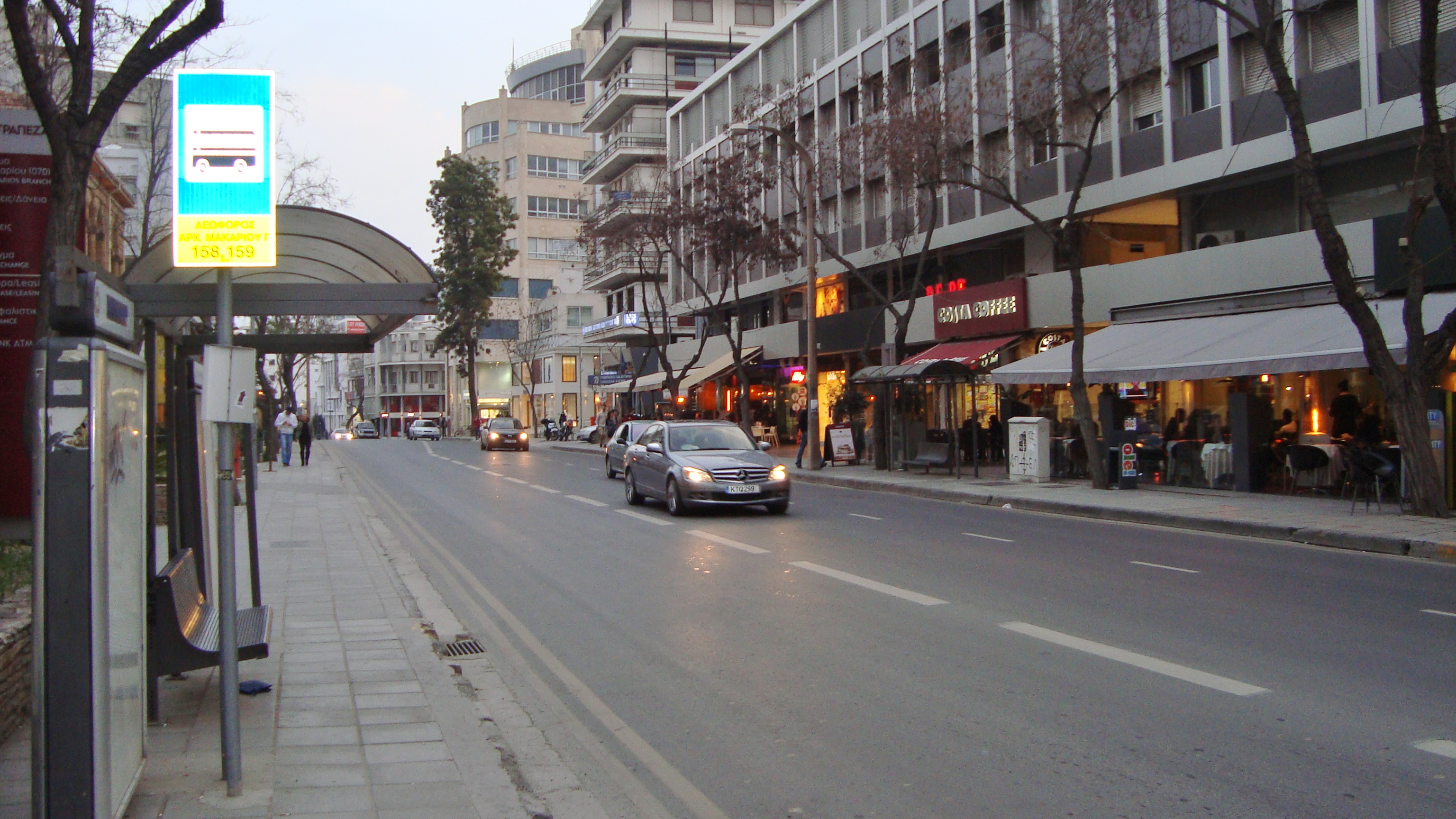
- Bus stop on Makariou Avenue (2011)
- Interactive map of Makarios Avenue
- Native name: Λεωφόρος Αρχιεπισκόπου Μακαρίου Γ΄ (Greek)
- Former name: Pluto Street (Colonial times)
- Part of: Nicosia Municipality
- Length: 2 kilometres (1.2 miles)
- Location: Nicosia, Cyprus
- Postal code: 1065
- Coordinates: 35.16421°N 33.36678°E

Construction
- Completion: 2021 (redevelopment)

Other
- Known for: Shopping & Leisure

Makariou Avenue (Greek: Λεωφόρος Αρχιεπισκόπου Μακαρίου Γ', romanized: Leophóros Arkhiepiskópou Makaríou Ǵ), also referred to as Makarios Avenue, is an avenue in the centre of Nicosia, Cyprus which covers a distance of 2 kilometres (1.2 mi). The street begins from the junction of Evagoras Avenue until Aglandjia Avenue and is named after the first President of Cyprus, Archbishop Makarios III.

== History ==
In colonial times Makarios Avenue was named Pluto Street, and was the main route to Limassol. It was lined with residential buildings, that have since then been torn down and had commercial properties built on the land. Buildings such as the Lyssiotis Mansion, built in 1928, is one of the remaining original buildings, which is now the Head Office of the National Bank of Greece in Cyprus. The area has been transformed into a commercial district with many of the original buildings demolished to make way for shops and office blocks. Makariou Avenue is parallel to Stasikratous Street and Themistokli Dervi Avenue.

In 2020, the street was under redevelopment works beginning September of that year. It came at a cost of €2,248,000. The plans were completed in December 2021. The project created four traffic lanes. Specifically two two-way bus and bicycle lanes and two one-way public vehicle roads, from south to north.

== Facilities ==
The most prominent features of Makariou avenue are the hundreds of various fashion shops, boutiques, high end international department stores and "City Plaza", the biggest Cypriot department store in the city centre. Makariou Avenue is also home to the "Galaxias Arcade" the largest stoa in the city centre of Nicosia, which has facilities ranging from bars, restaurants, a virgin music megastore to Hairstylists. Kotsovolos, the largest Greek electronics store is also located on the street.

In terms of high-rises, "Nicosia 360", the tallest building in Nicosia is on the avenue.

== Gallery ==
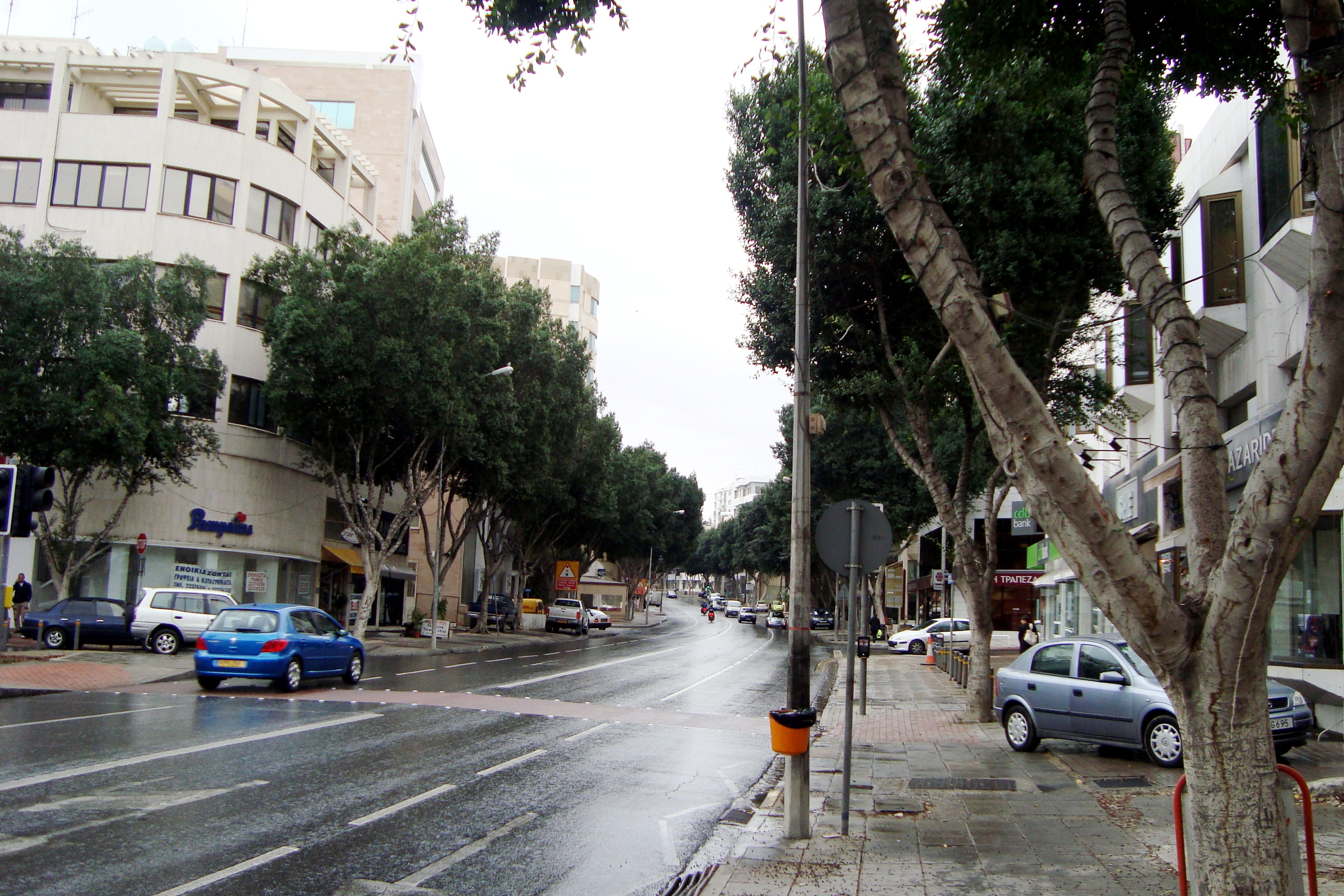
Raining Makariou Avenue in downtown Nicosia (November 2011)

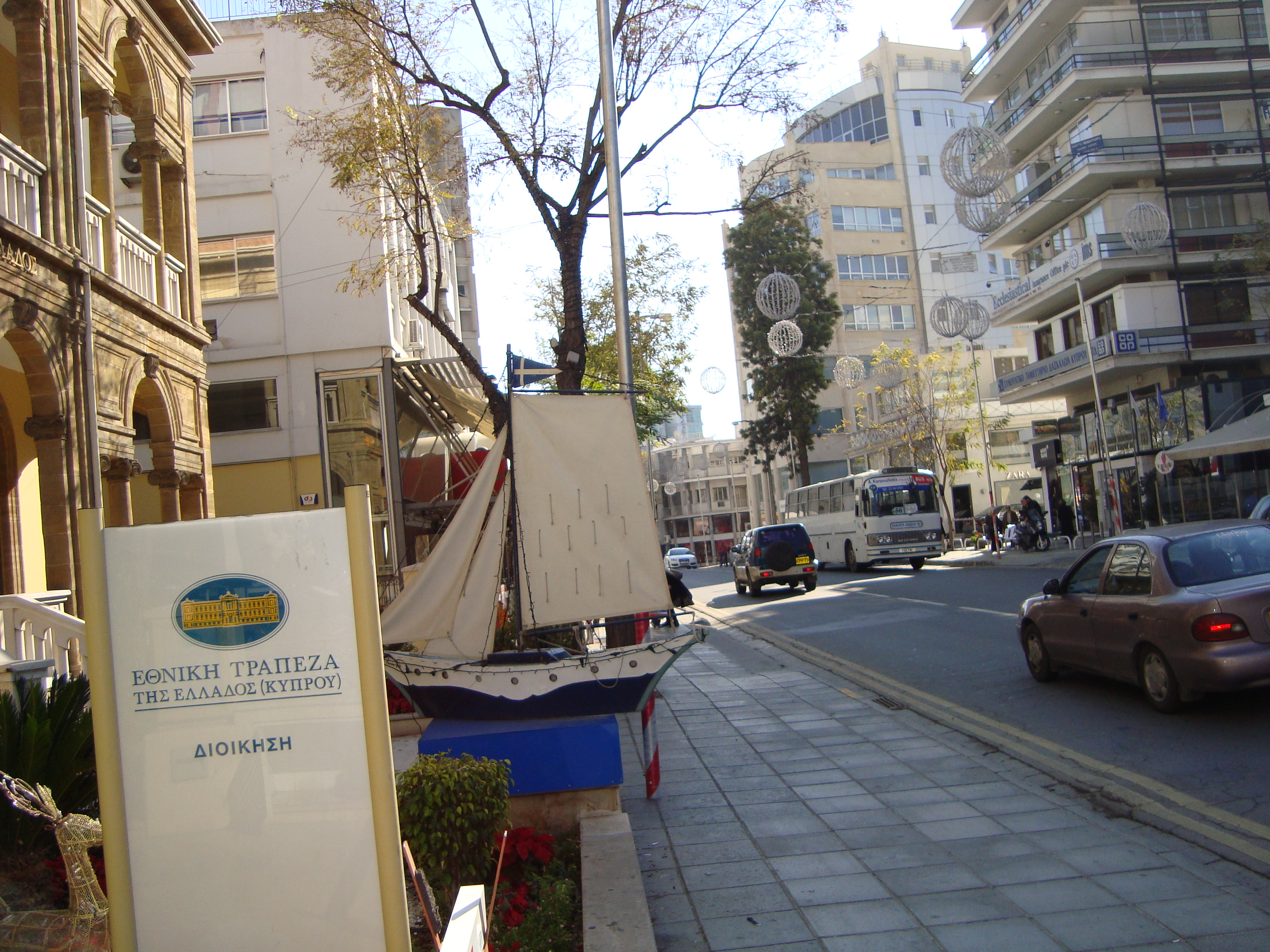
View of Makariou during Christmas, with the Lyssiotis Mansion on the left

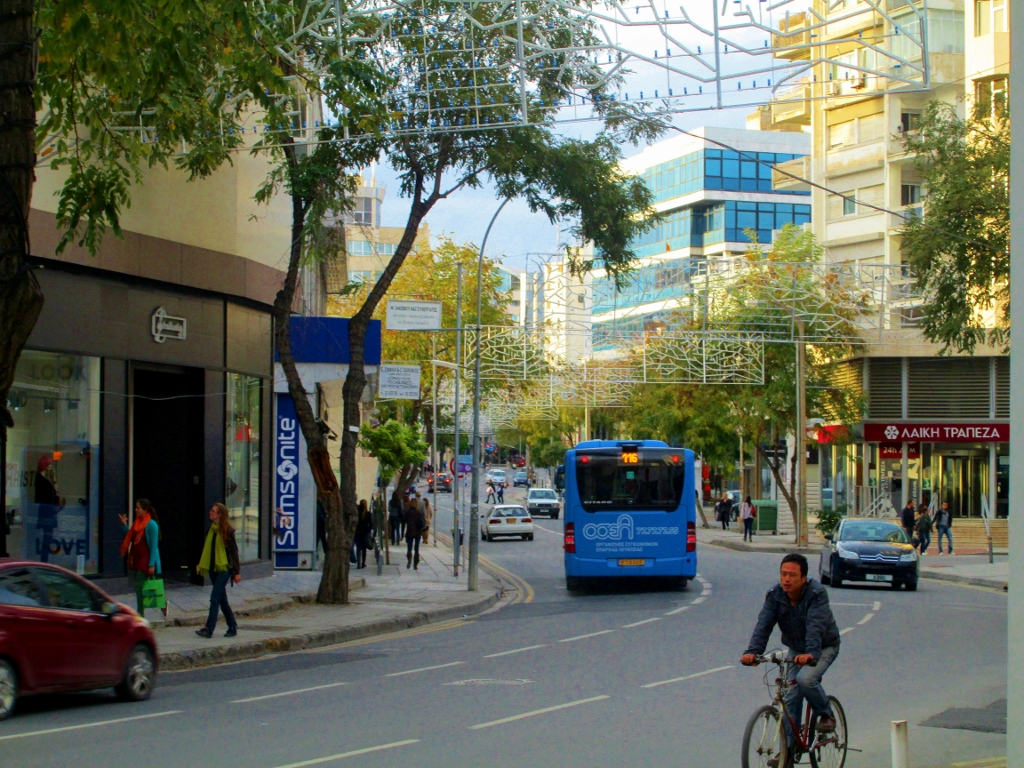
Makariou Avenue during the afternoon (December 2012)

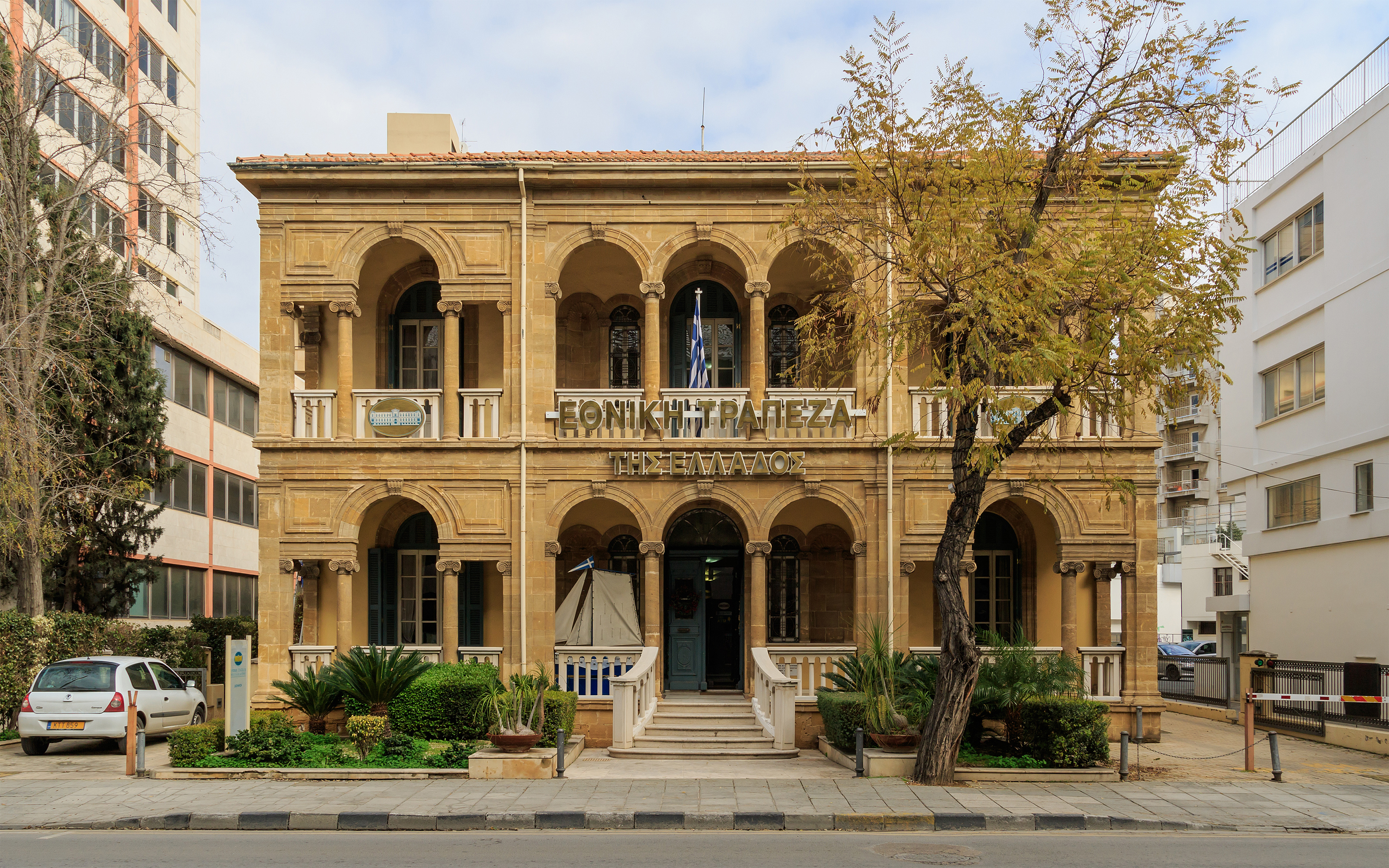
National Bank of Greece (Lysiotis Mansion, built 1928-29)

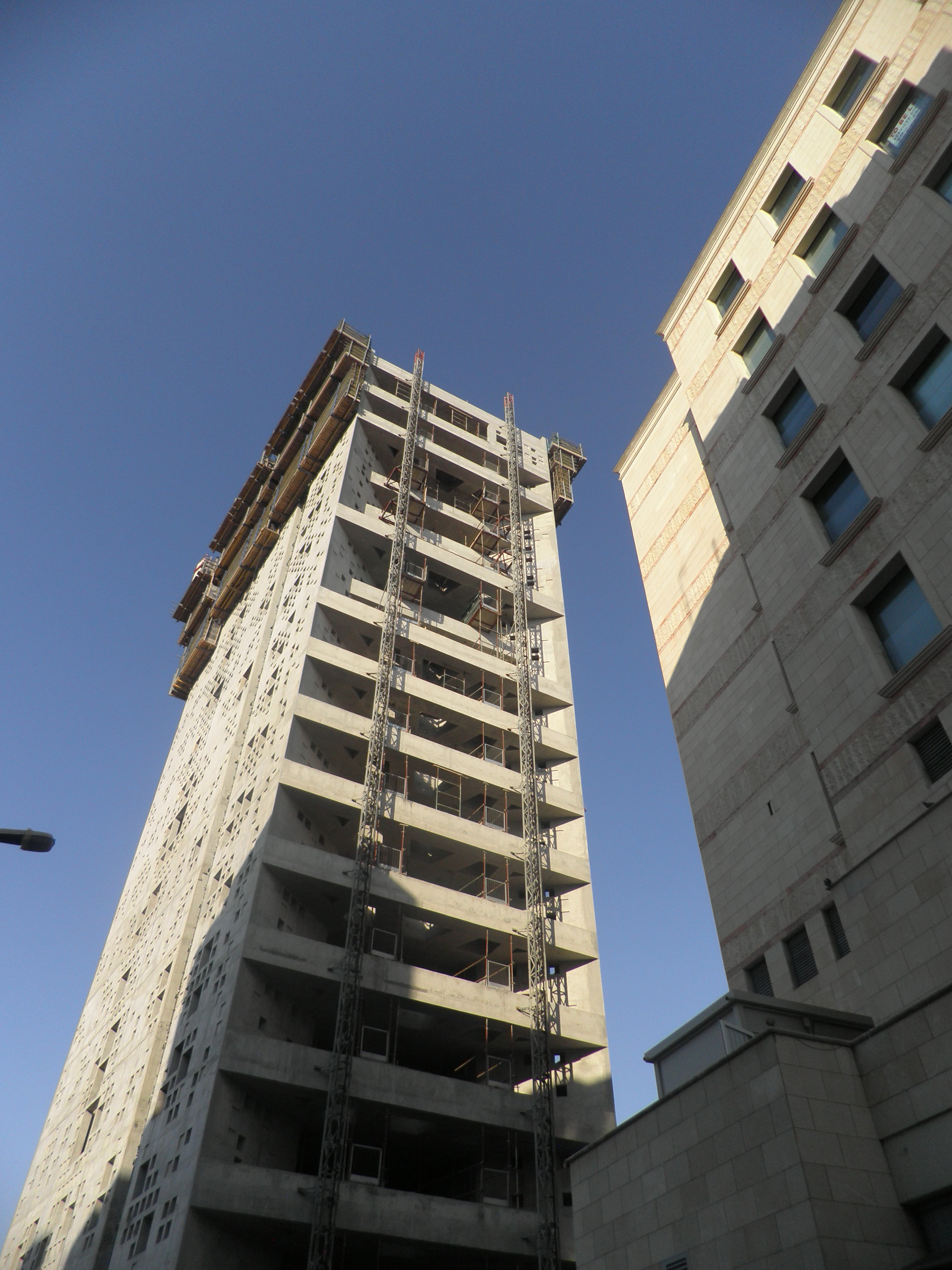
Highrises in Makariou Avenue (August 2011)

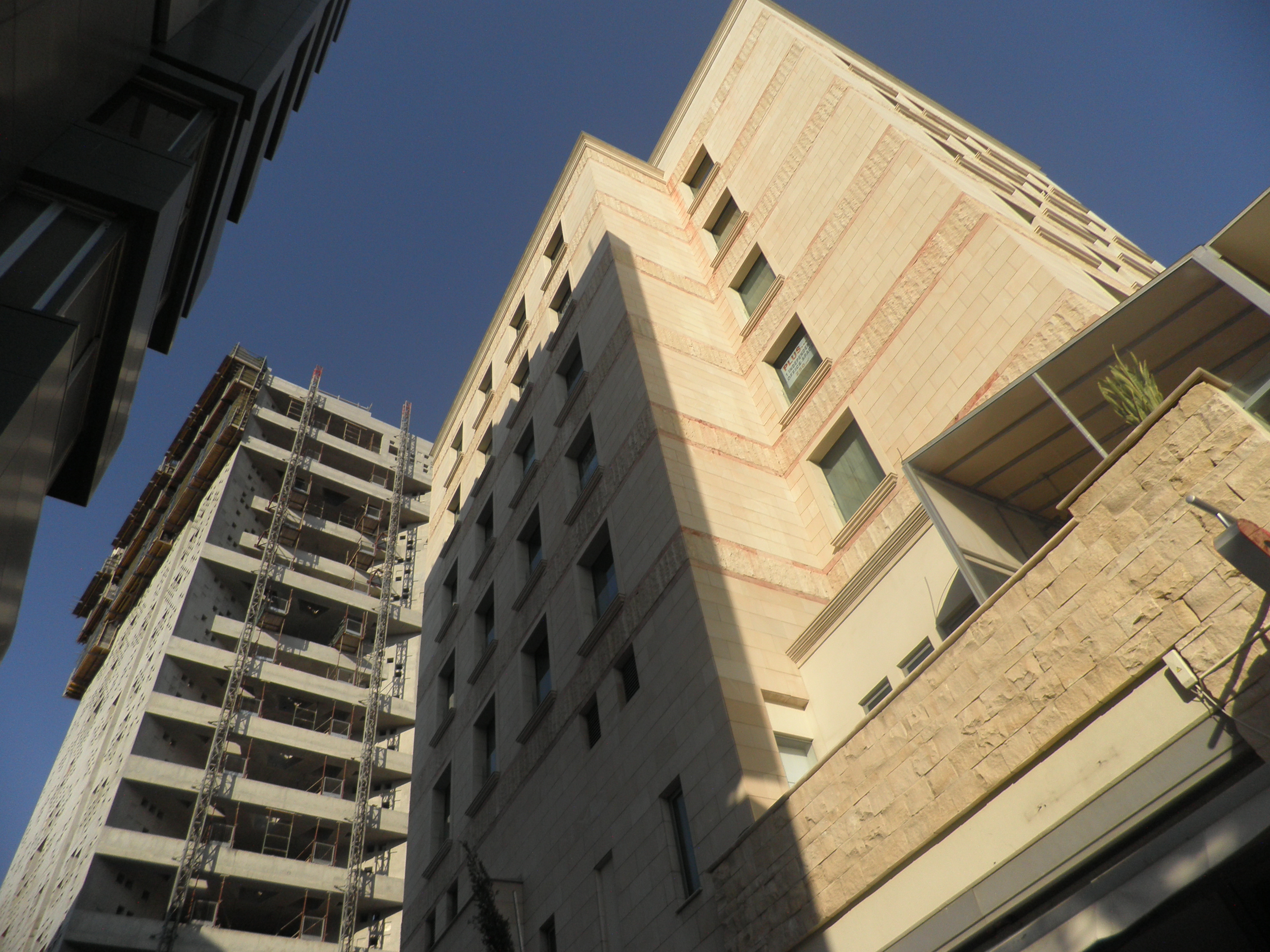
Detail of Highrises in Makariou Avenue (August 2011)

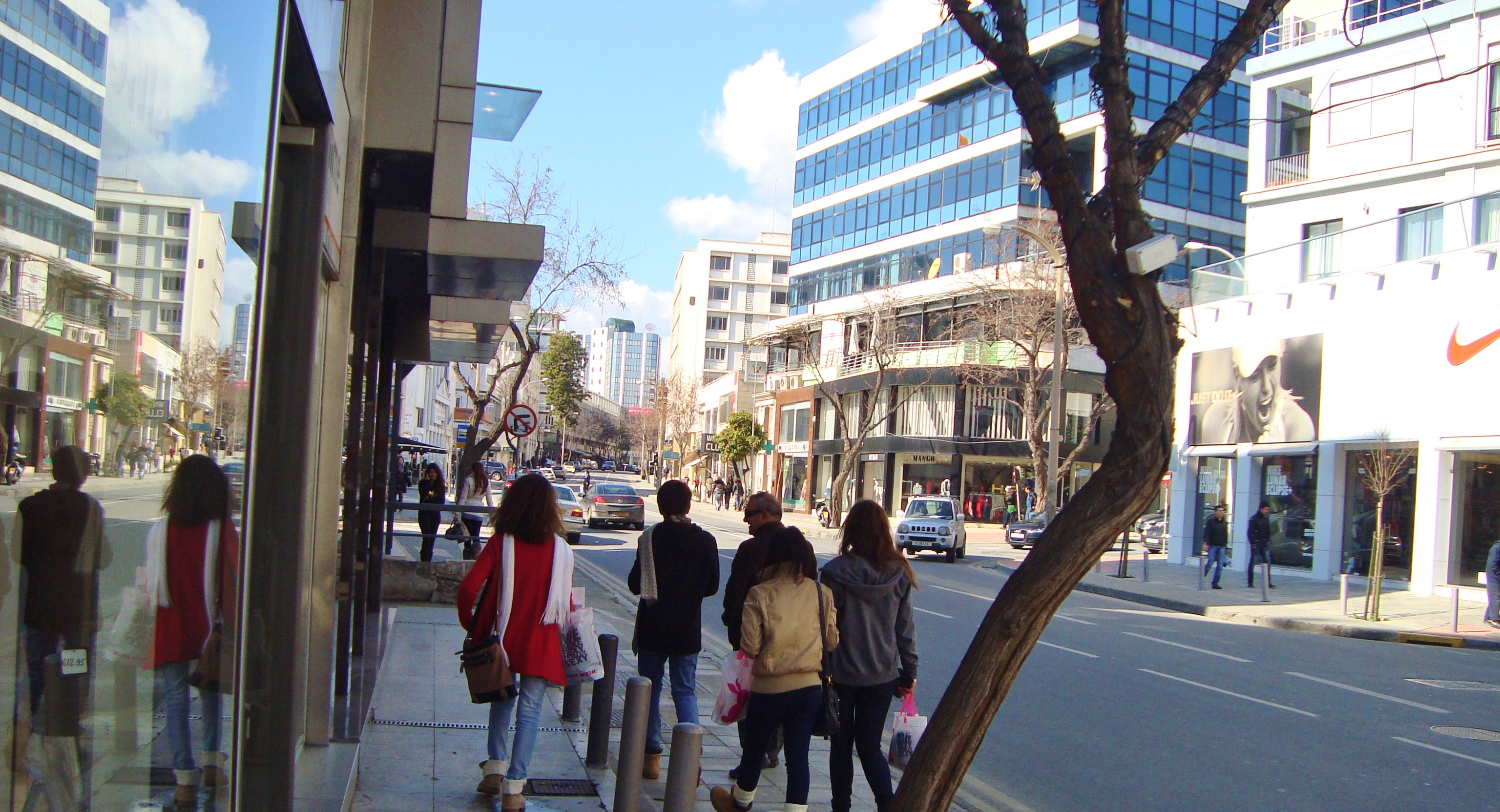
Makariou Avenue in February 2012

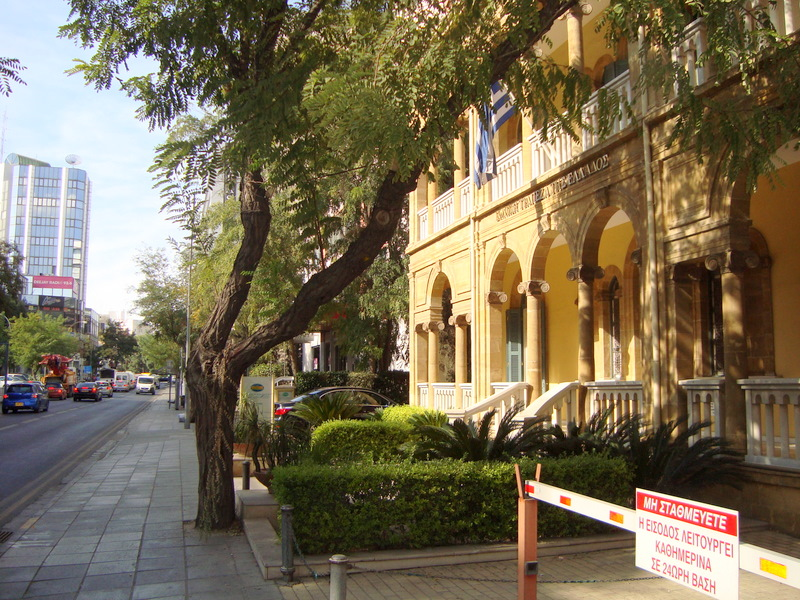
National bank of Greece (Lyssiotis Mansion) on Makarios Avenue

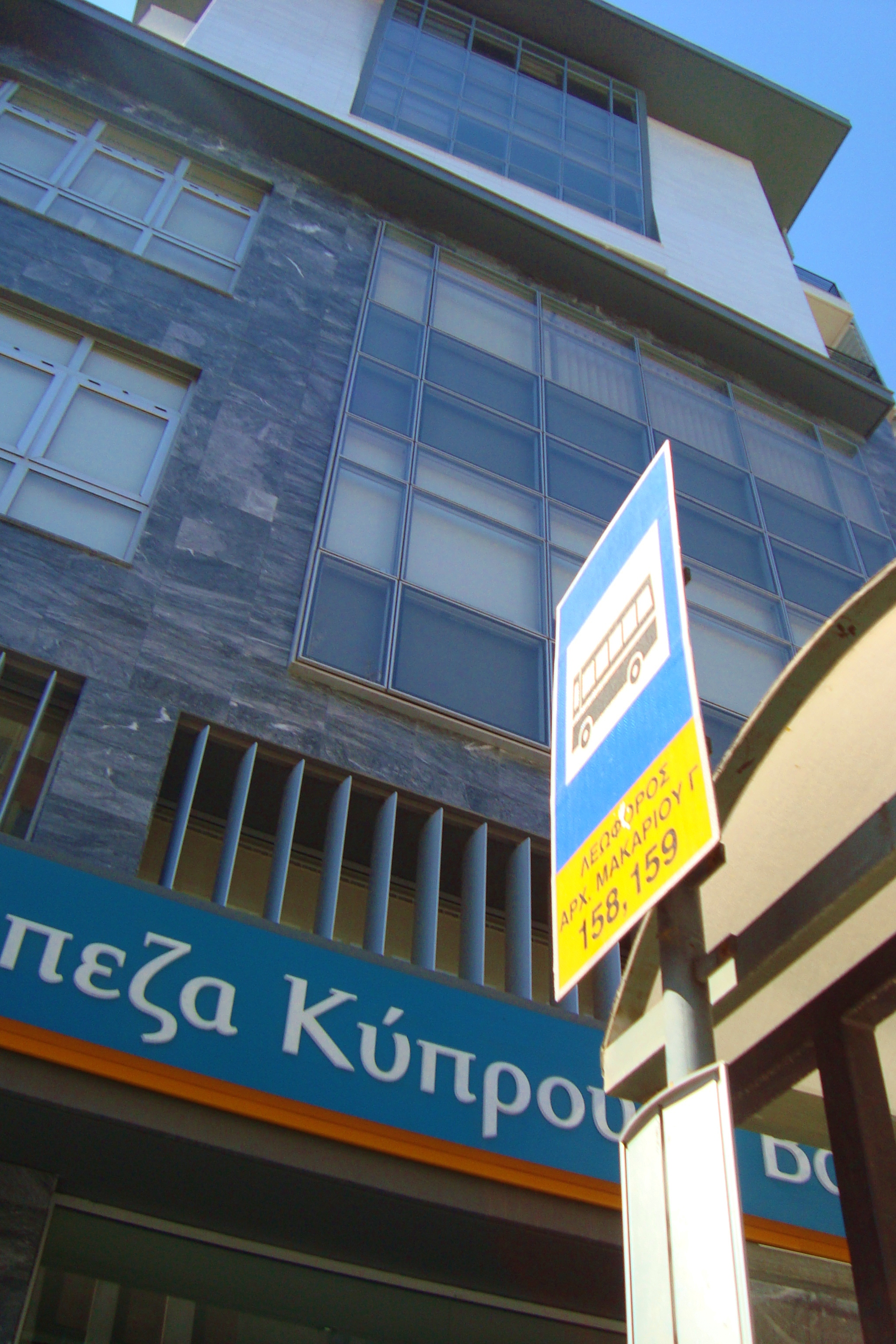
Bus stop in Makarios Avenue

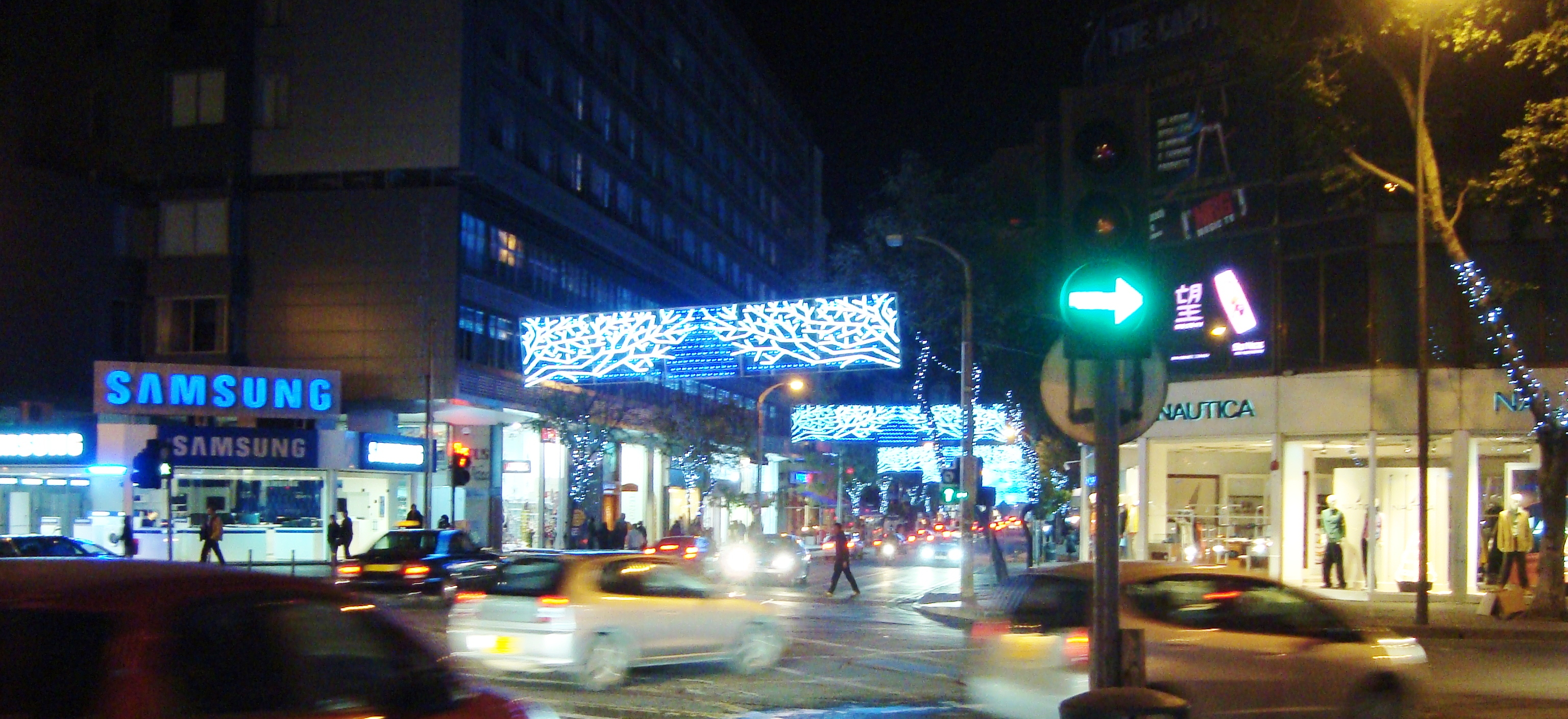
Makarios Avenue at night decorated Christmas (December 2011)

== See also ==
- Ledra Street
- Nicosia
- Nicosia District
- List of shopping streets and districts by city
- List of shopping malls in Cyprus
