= Stasikratous Street =

Shopping street in Nicosia, Cyprus

Stasikratous Street (Greek: Οδός Στασικράτους, Turkish: Stasikratus Sokağı), is a major shopping street located in the centre of Nicosia, Cyprus.

== Location ==
The street begins at the intersection of the capital's Spyrou Kyprianou Avenue and Makariou Anevue. It runs parallel to Makariou Avenue and is filled with top designer brands and an assortment of coffee shops and restaurants.

== Big Brands ==
Stasikratous hosts a number of international prestigious brands and has been categorized as one of the most famous streets in the Eastern Mediterranean region. The avenue is considered a small scale comparative of Bond Street in London.

== History ==
Stasikratous Street was once an ordinary street with typical houses and office buildings. In a relatively short time frame the street was transformed into one of the most popular and expensive shopping areas in the capital city of Nicosia. Big brands and boutiques now operate shops on this avenue while the street also houses luxurious jewelers and other specialty shops.

== Photogallery ==
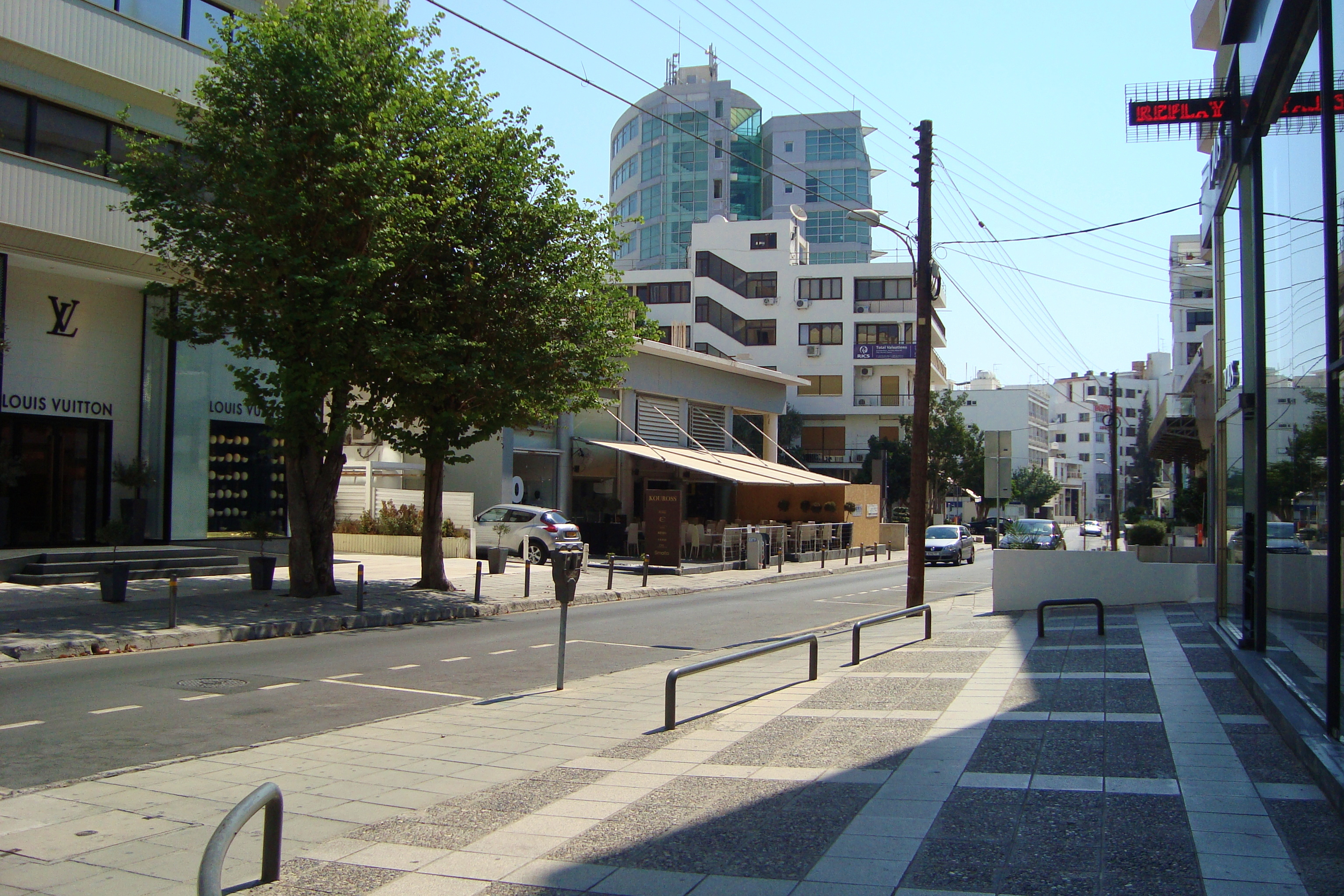
View of the Avenue

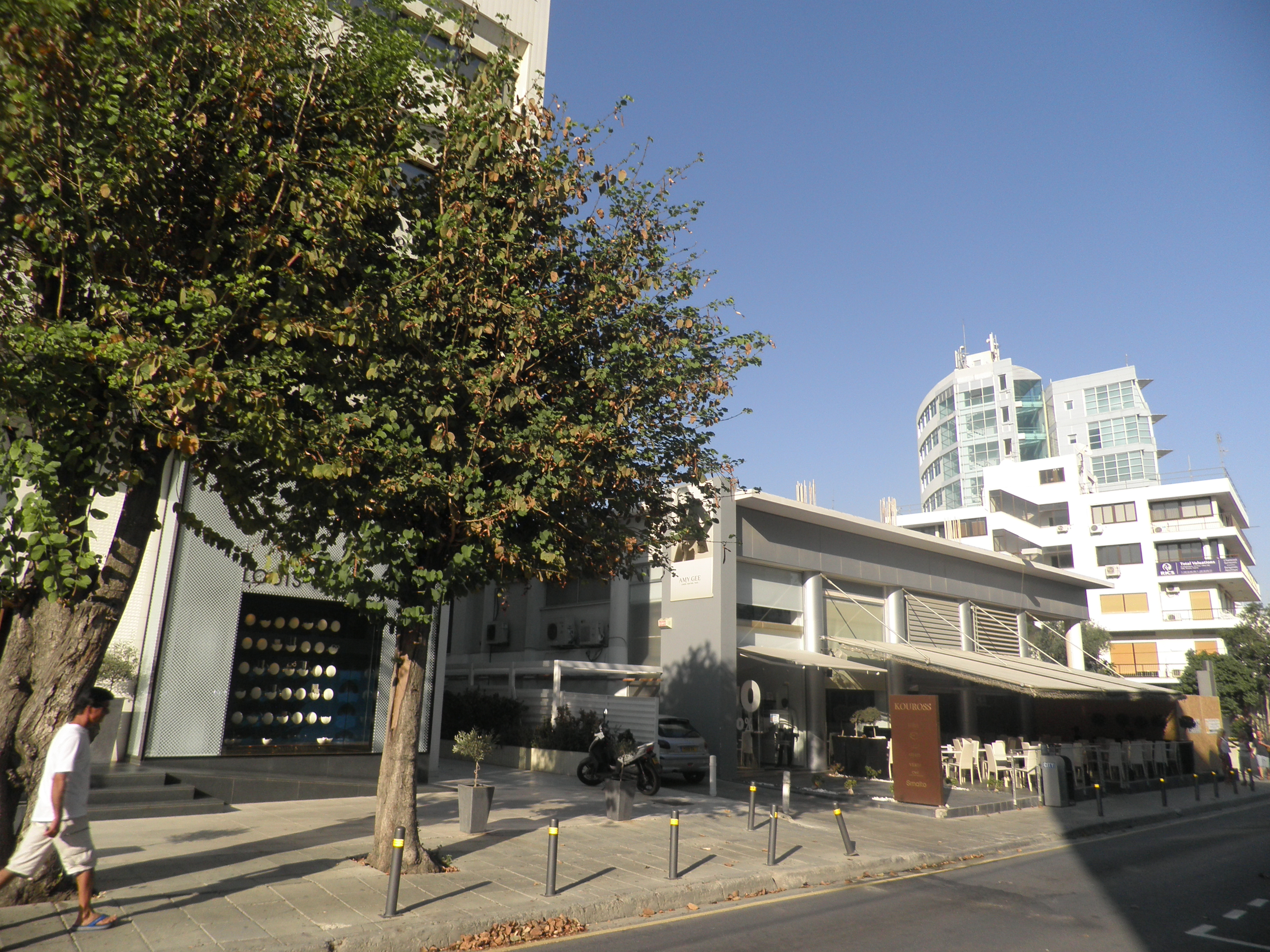
View of the Avenue

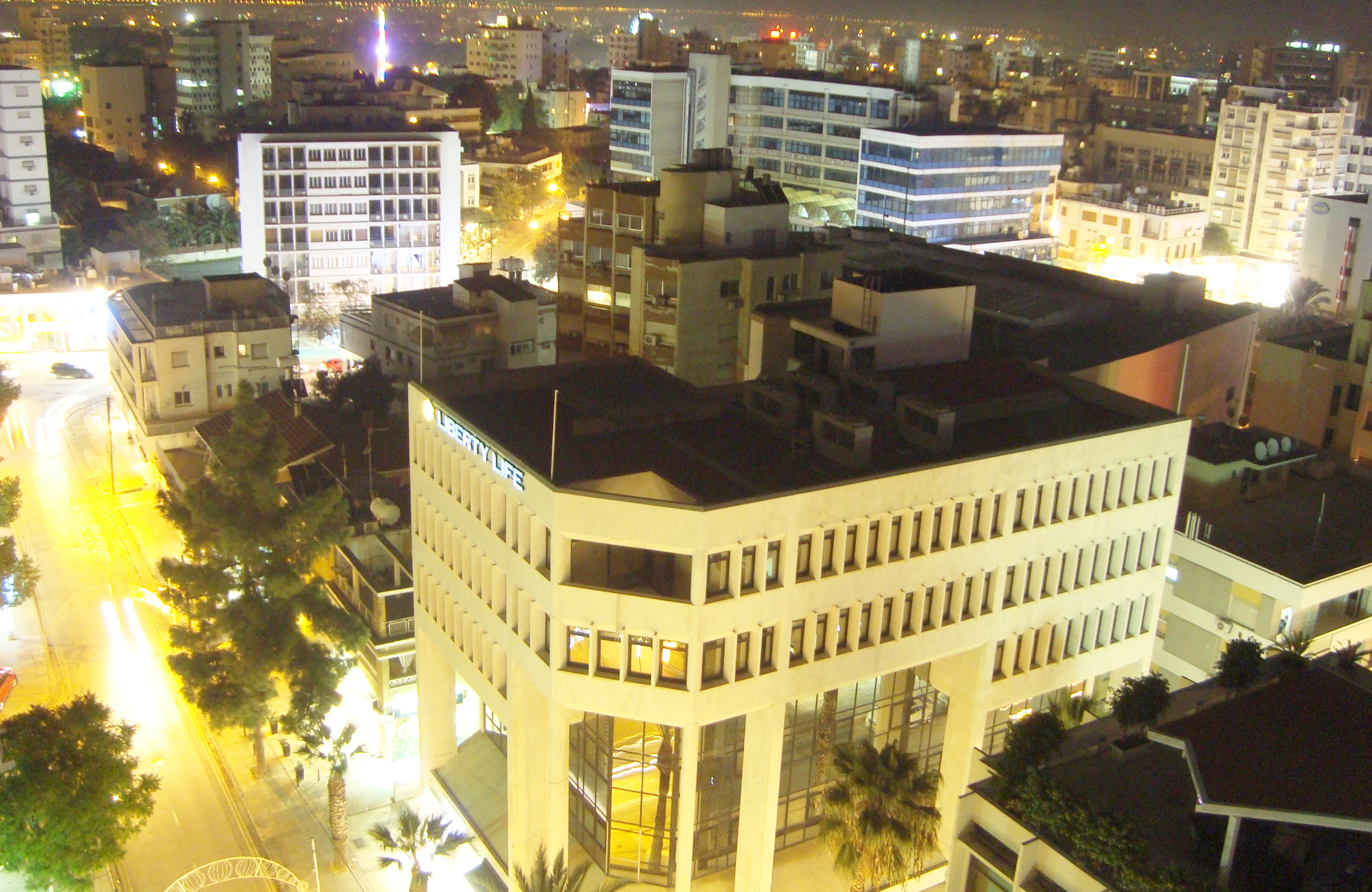
Aerial night view of the Avenue

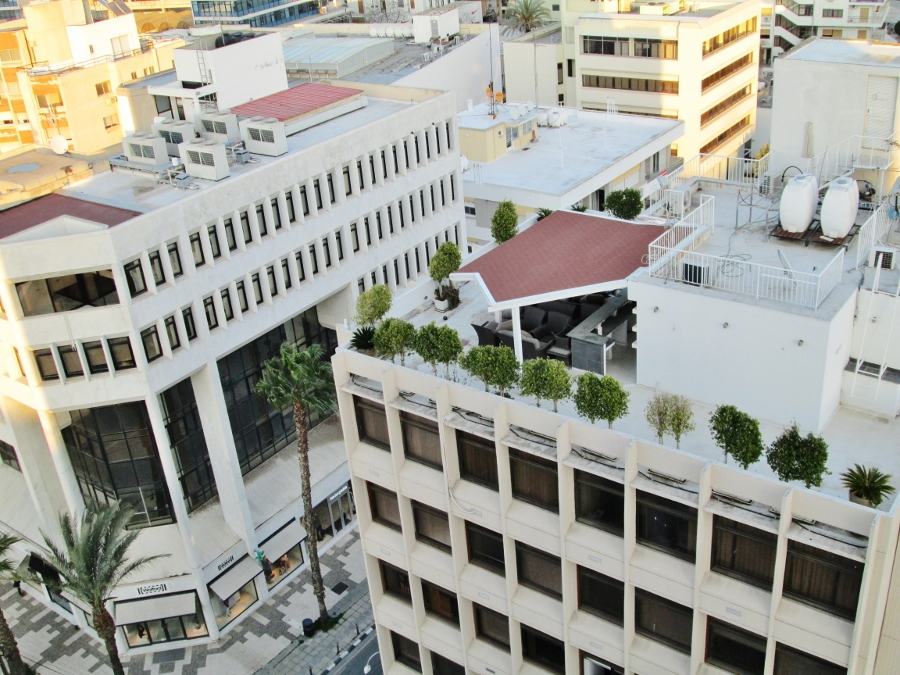
Aerial view of Stasikratous Avenue

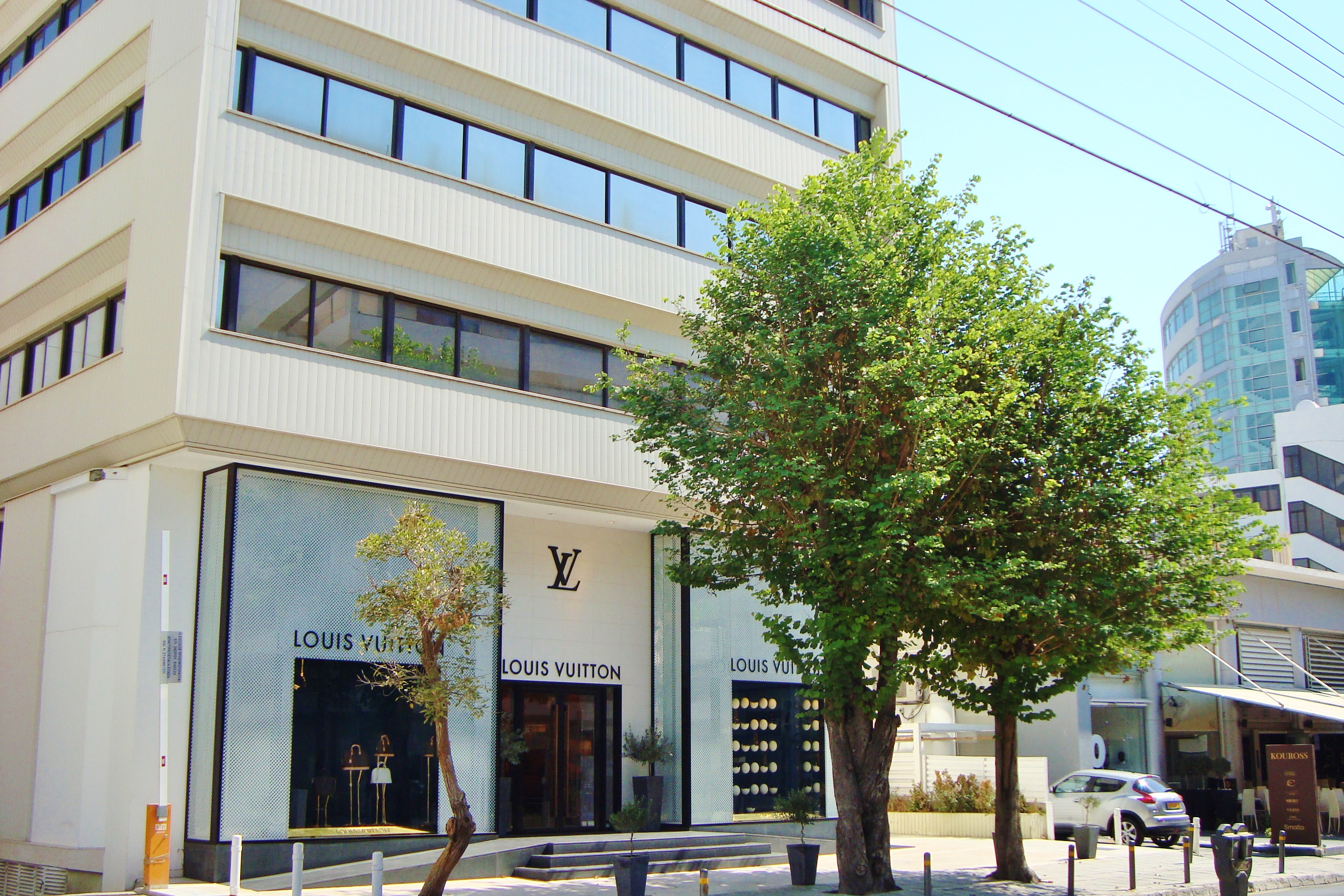
High end stores
