= Archangel Michael Trypiotis Church =

Cultural property in Nicosia, Cyprus

- Trypiotis Church
- Greek: Ιερός Ναός Αρχαγγέλου Μιχαήλ Τρυπιώτου
- 35.171312°N 33.362687°E
- Location: Nicosia
- Country: Cyprus
- Denomination: Greek Orthodox

History
- Dedication: Archangel Michael

Architecture
- Functional status: Active

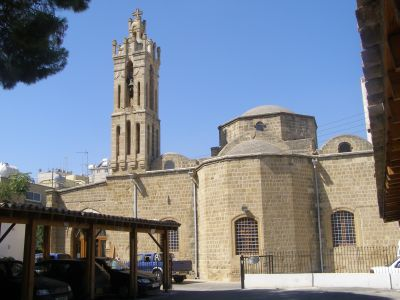
Nikozja trypiotis.jpg

The Archangel Michael Trypiotis Church (Greek: Ιερός Ναός Αρχαγγέλου Μιχαήλ Τρυπιώτου) is a Greek Orthodox church in the old town of Nicosia, Cyprus.

Although incorporating earlier material, according to the inscription beside the south porch the church is dated to 1695 and it was built at the expense of the Priest Iakovos and Christian parishioners.

Important features of the church are the beautiful 18th century iconostasis that was carved by Taliadoros and the icon of Archangel Michael, which dates to 1634.

The Trypiotis Quarter of Nicosia is named after the church.

The word Trypiotis means ‘maker of the hole’.
