= Themistokli Dervi Avenue =

Themistokli Dervi Avenue (Greek: Λεωφόρος θεμιστοκλή Δέρβη, Turkish: Themistokli Dervi Caddesi), is a major shopping street located in the centre of Nicosia, Cyprus. The avenue hosts a number of internationally prestigious brands. It also includes numerous cafeterias and restaurants. It also hosts the headquarters of Piraeus Bank Cyprus (formerly Arab Bank).

== Photogallery ==
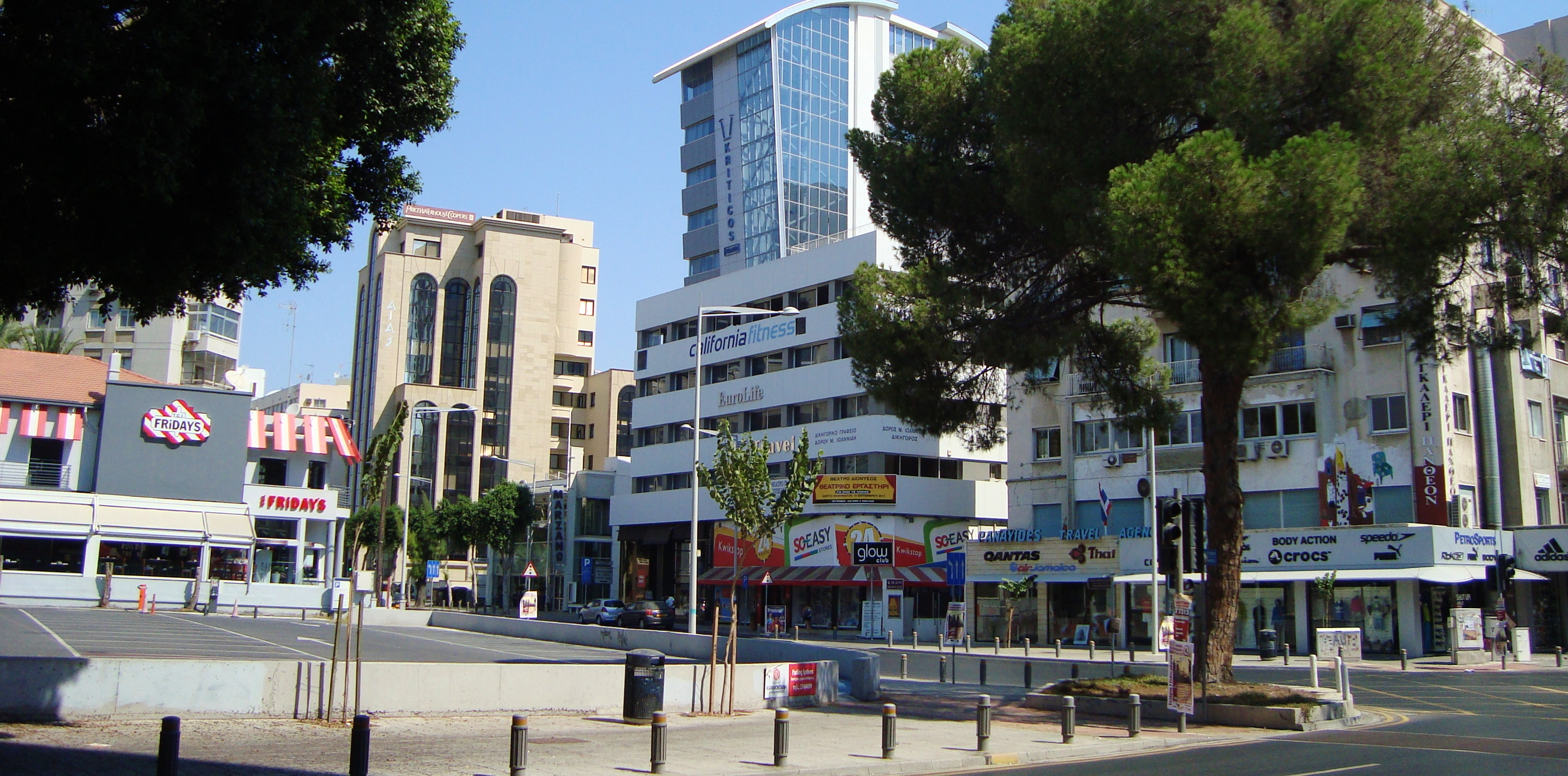
Buildings along Dervi Avenue

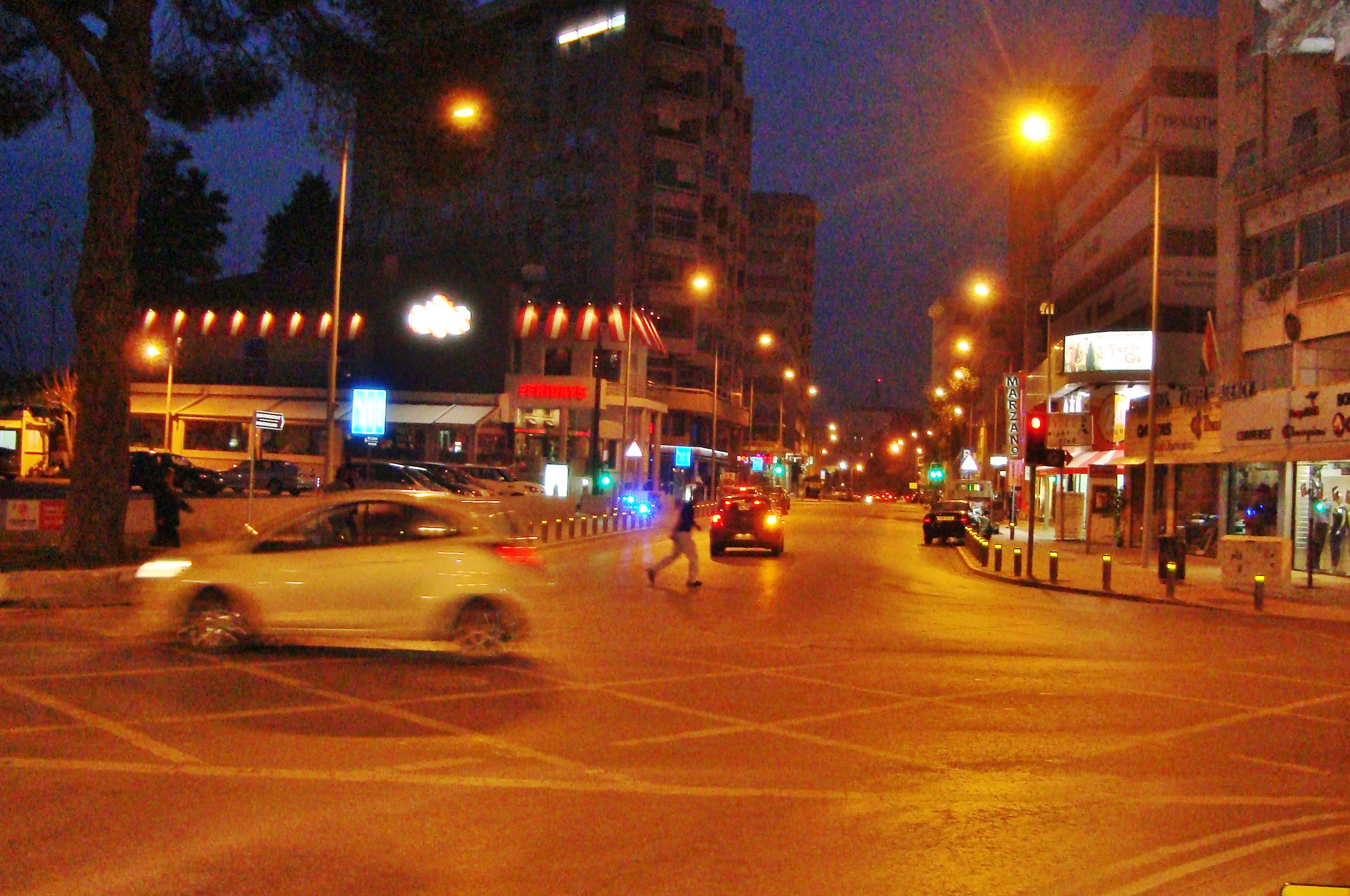
Themistokli Dervi avenue by night in Nicosia

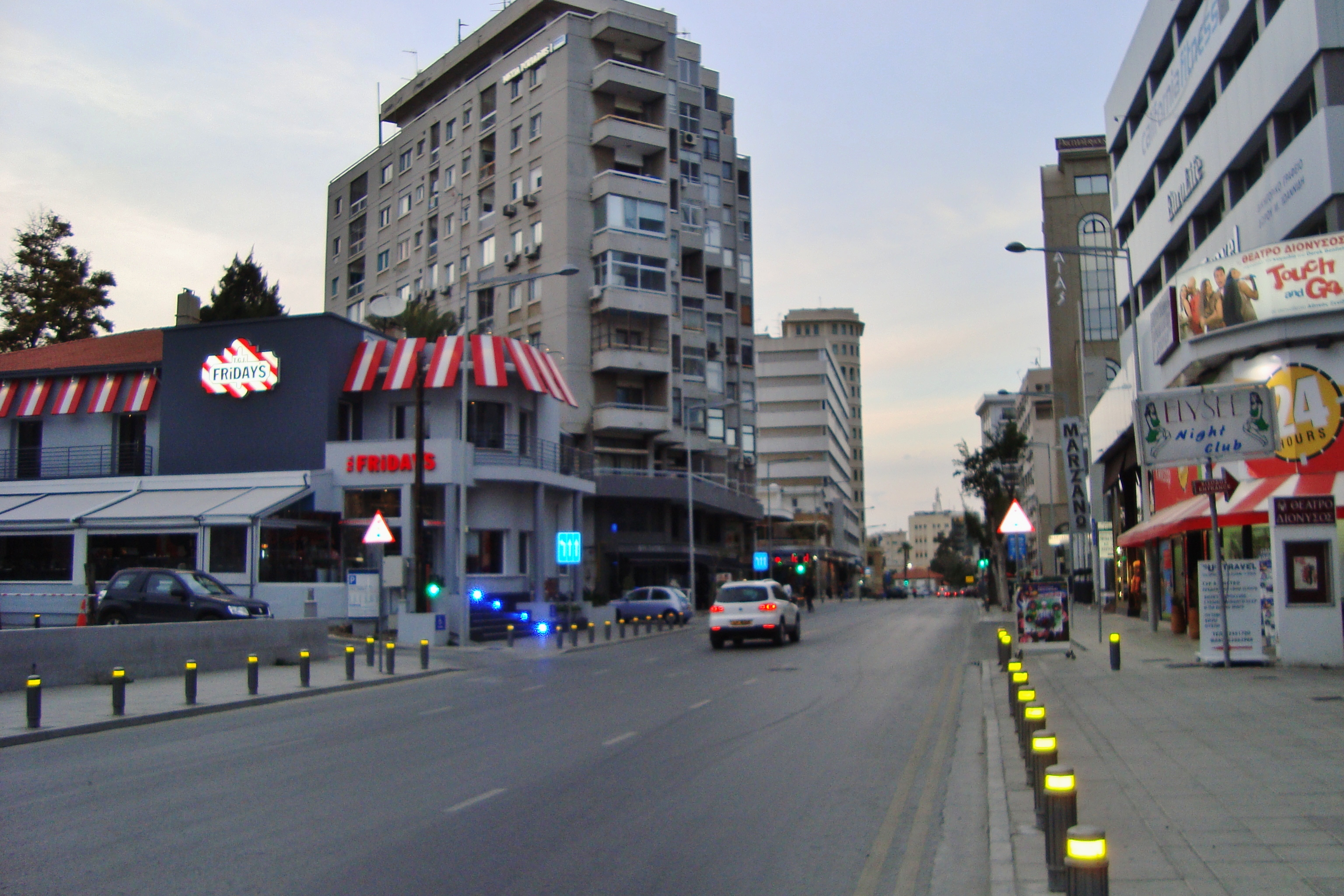
Themistokli Dervi avenue during afternoon

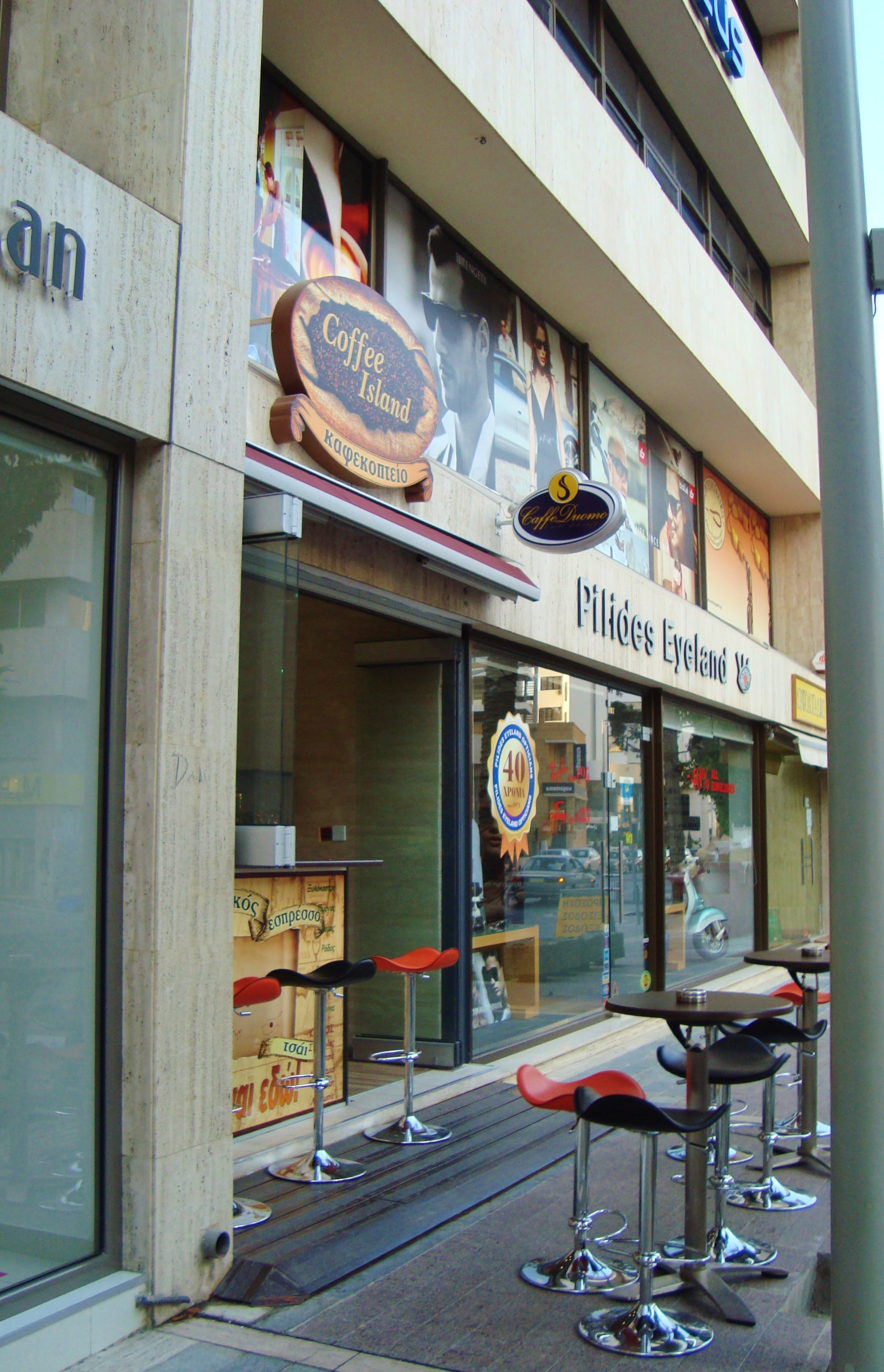
Themistokli Dervi avenue cafeteria
