= North Nicosia =

De facto capital of Northern Cyprus

Northern Nicosia: Kuzey Lefkoşa (Turkish); Βόρεια Λευκωσία (Greek)
- Capital city
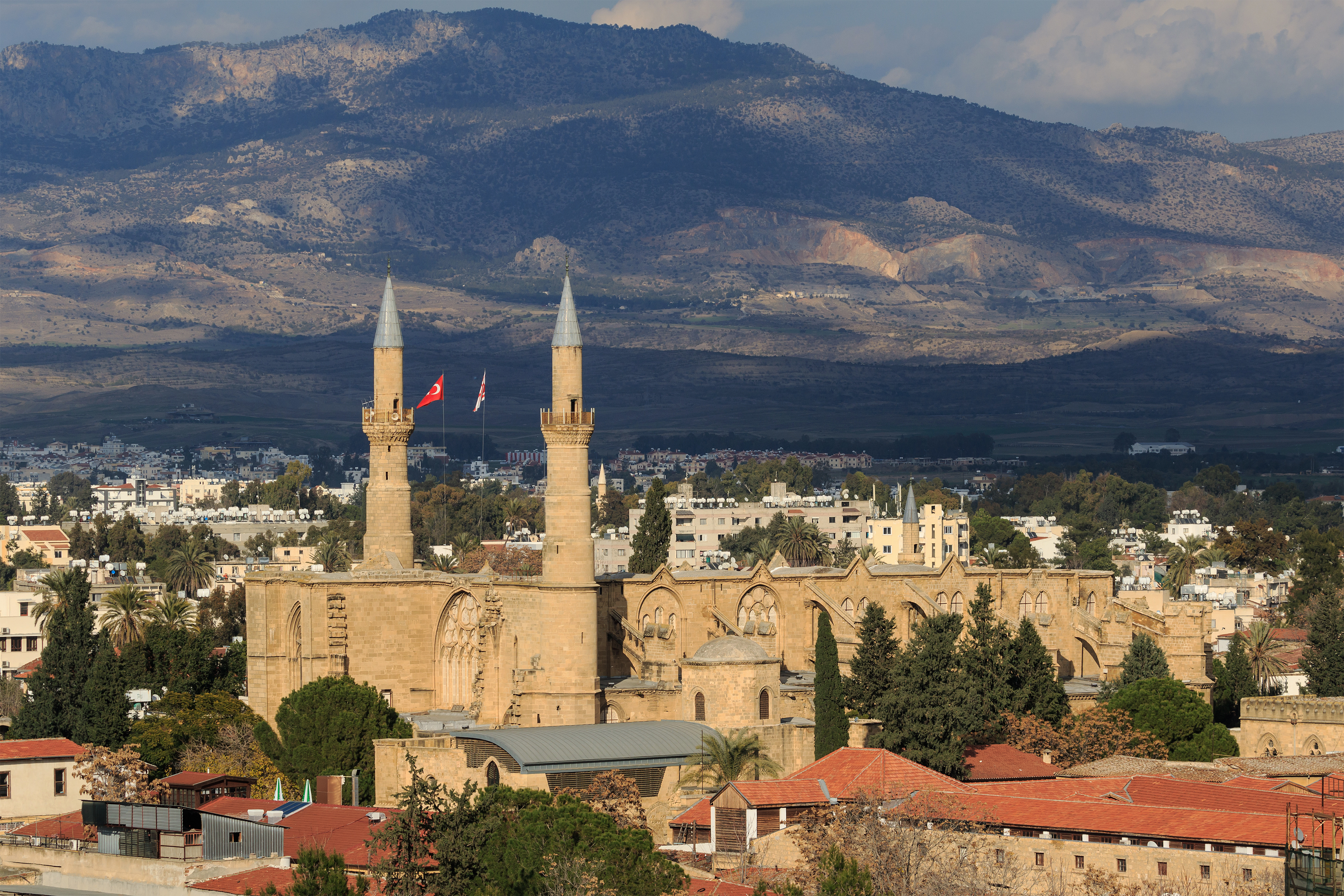
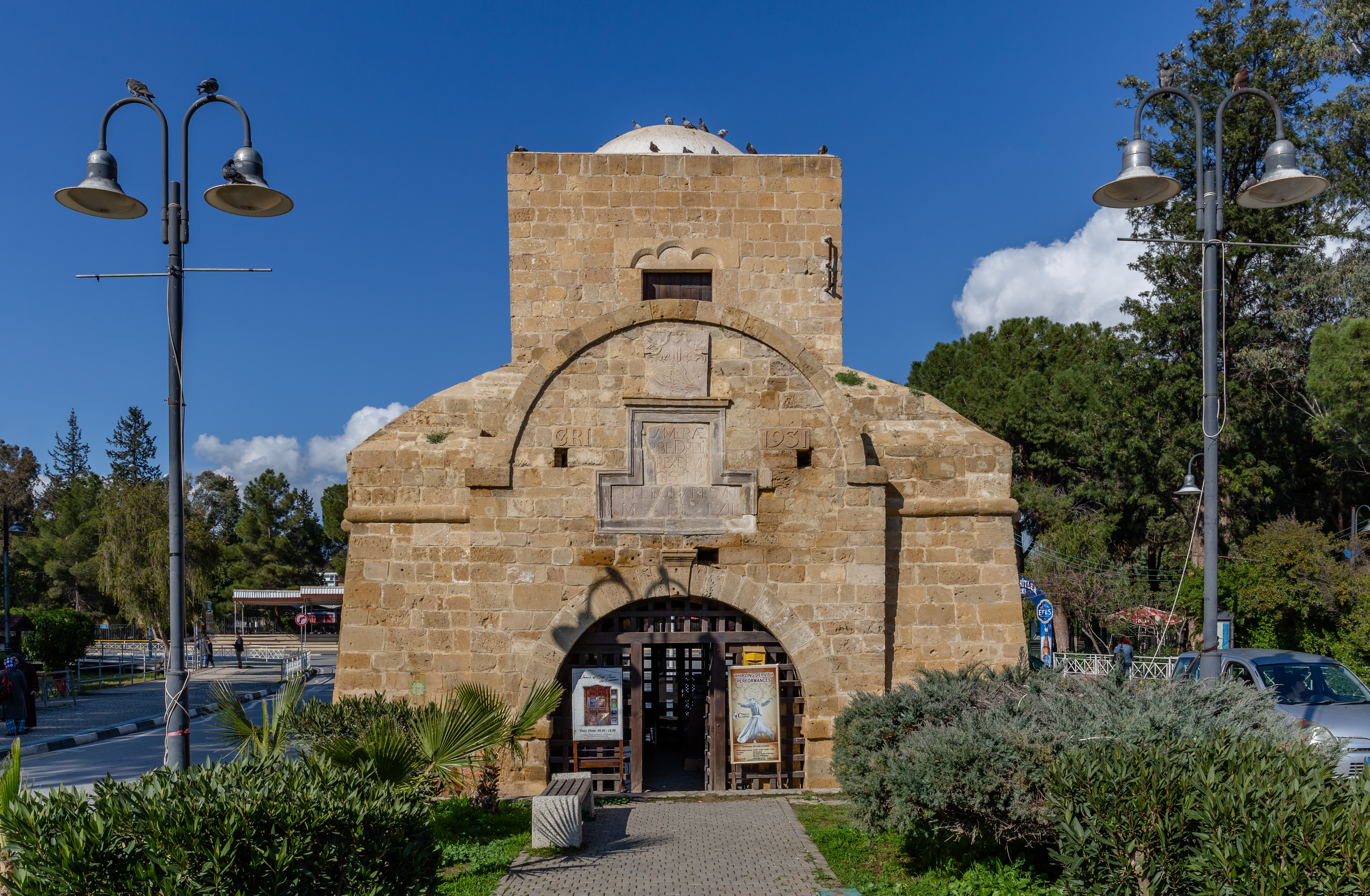
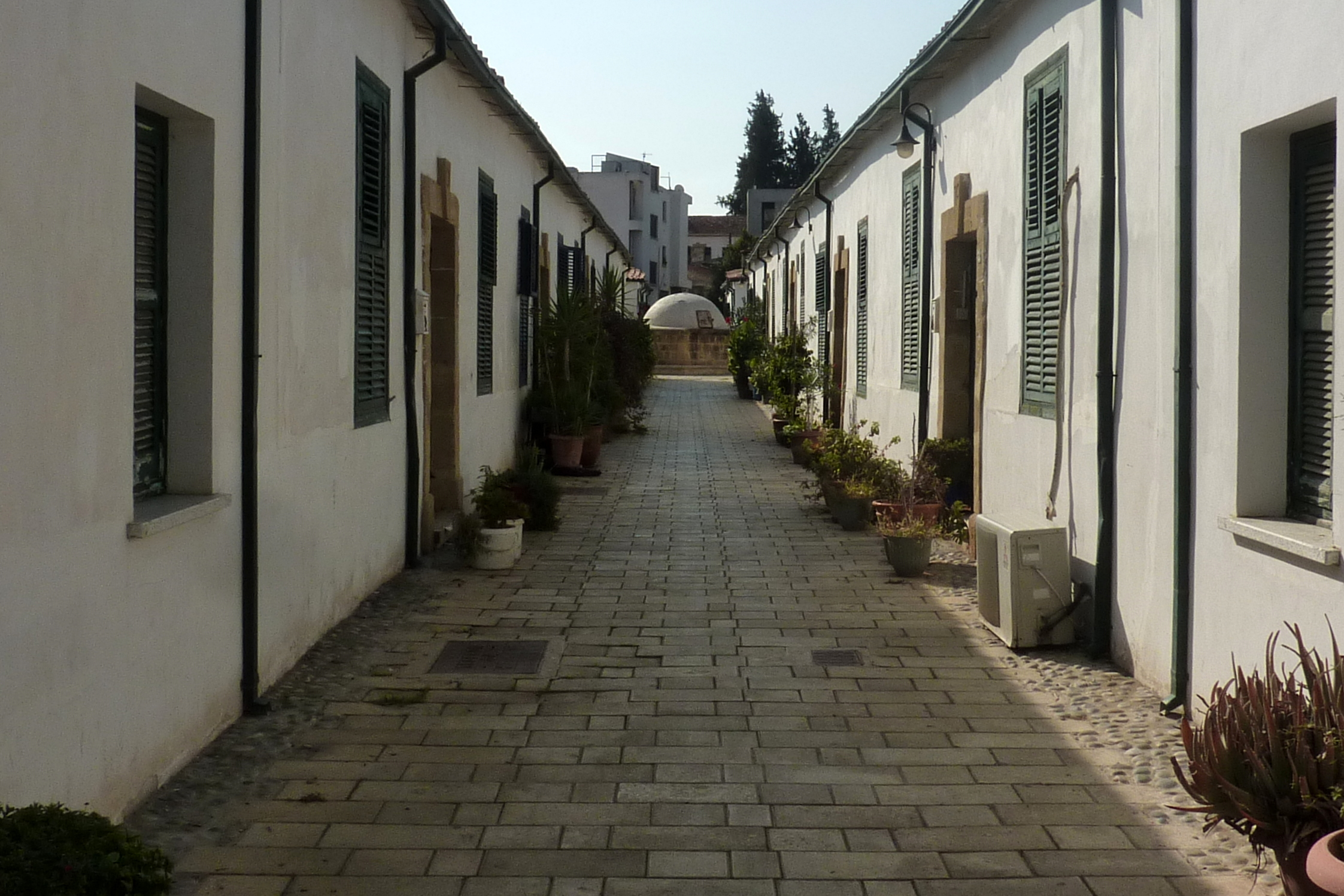
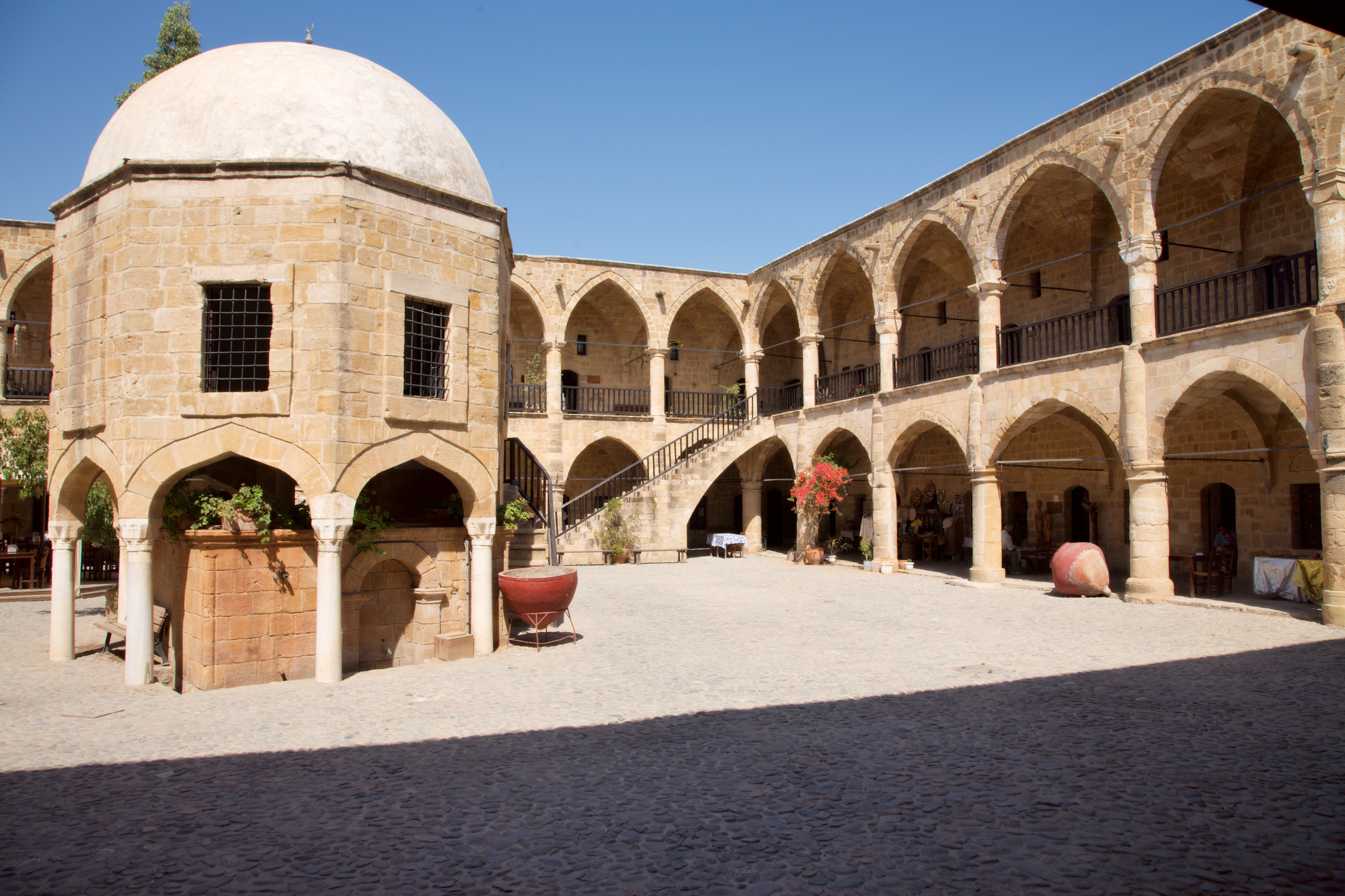
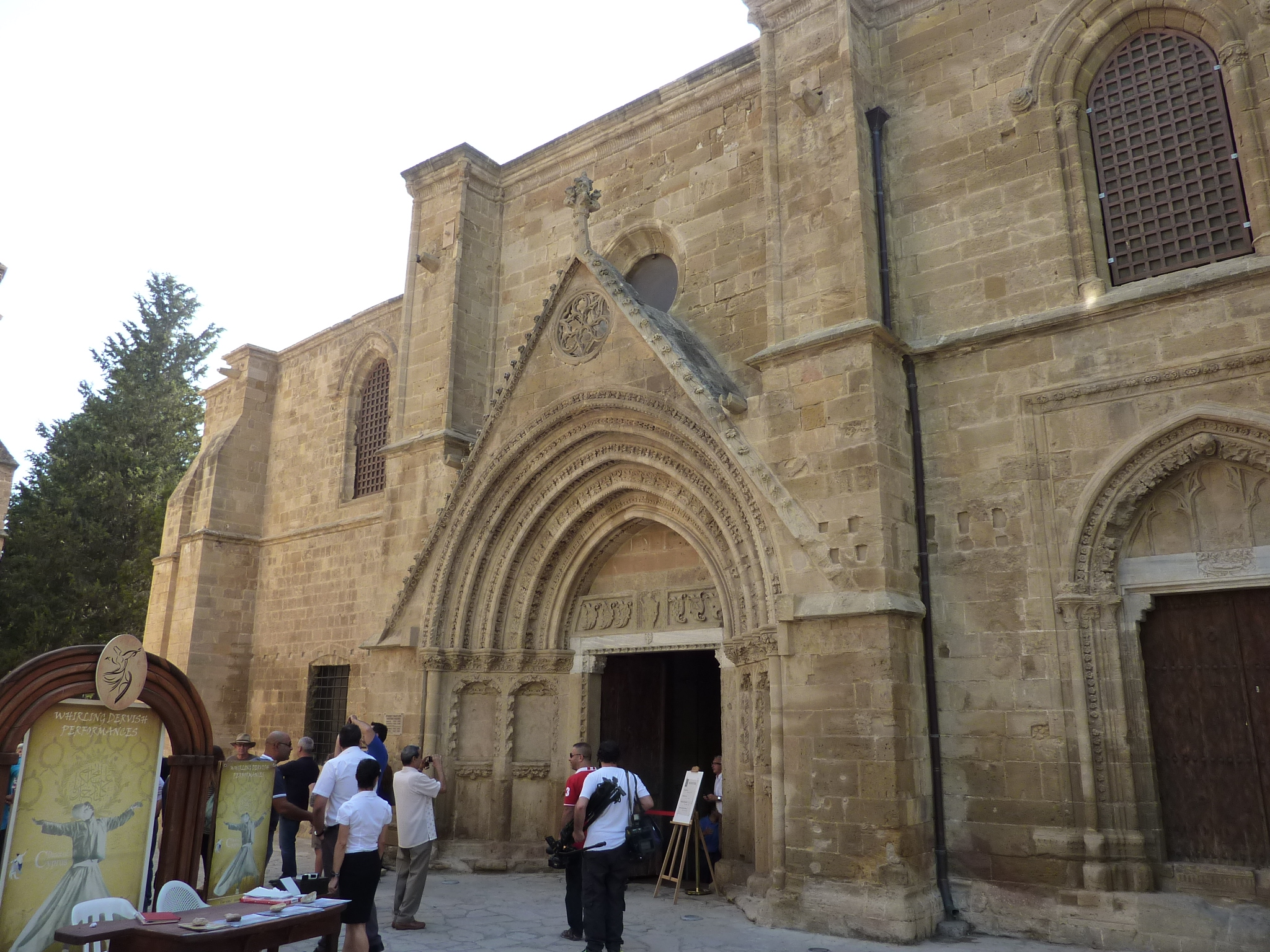
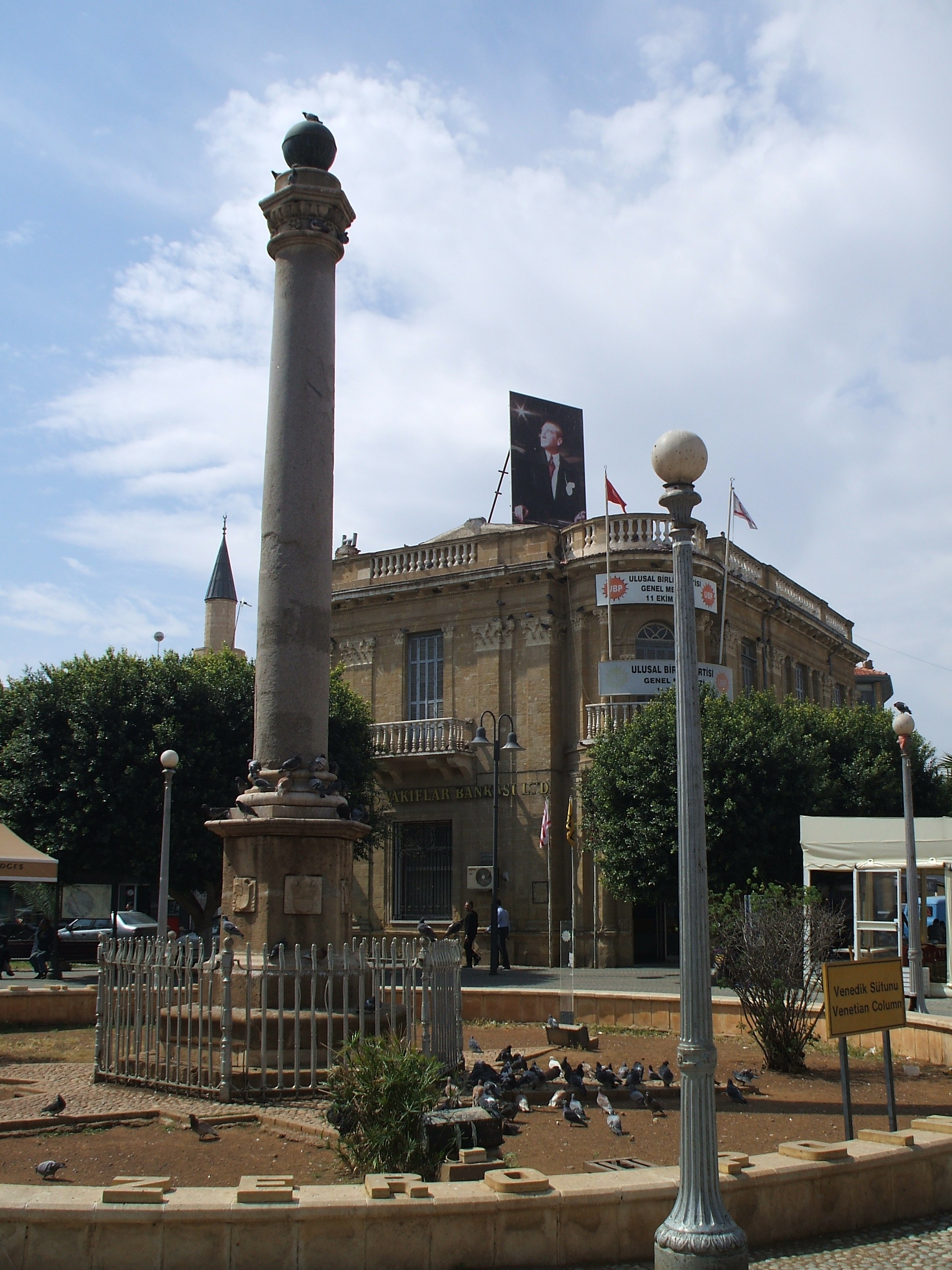
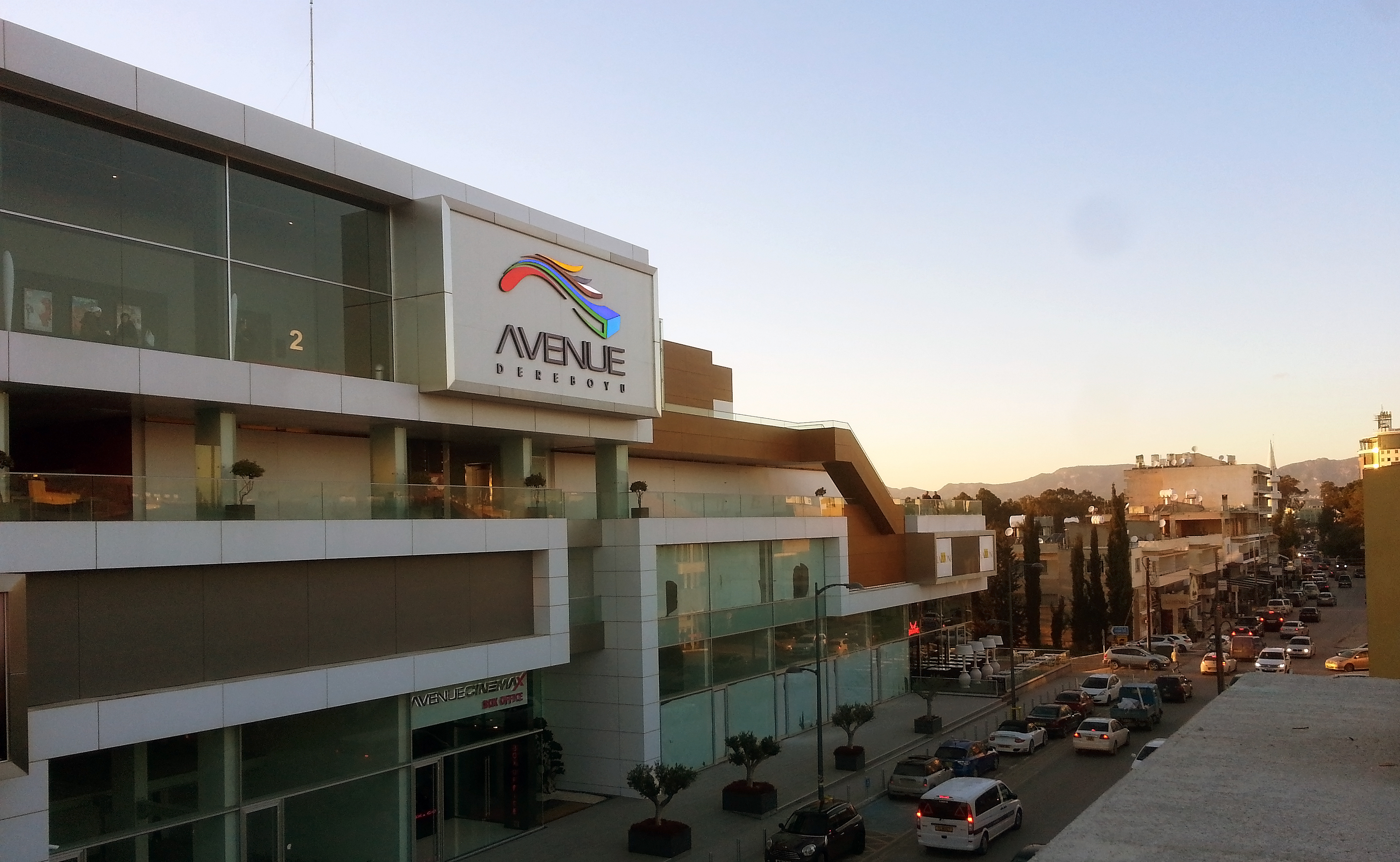
- Skyline of North Nicosia with Selimiye Mosque Kyrenia Gate Samanbahçe Büyük Han Bedesten Sarayönü and the Venetian Column Dereboyu Avenue

- Flag Seal
- Nicknames: "The City that Smells of Jasmine" in Turkish: "Yasemin Kokulu Şehir" "The City" in Cypriot Turkish: "Şehir"
- Location in Cyprus Northern Nicosia (Europe)
- Coordinates: 35°11′24″N 33°21′49″E
- Claimed by: Republic of Cyprus (internationally recognised), Northern Cyprus (recognised only by Turkey)
  - District: Nicosia District
- Administered by: Northern Cyprus
  - District: Lefkoşa District

Government
  - Mayor: Mehmet Harmancı (TDP)

Area
  - Capital city: 92.8 km^{2} (35.8 sq mi)
  - Metro: 165.2 km^{2} (63.8 sq mi)

Population (2011)
  - Capital city: 61,378
  - Density: 661/km^{2} (1,710/sq mi)
  - Metro: 82,539
- Demonym: North Nicosian
- Time zone: UTC+02:00 (EET)
  - Summer (DST): UTC+03:00 (EEST)
- Website: Nicosia Turkish Municipality

North Nicosia or Northern Nicosia (Turkish: Kuzey Lefkoşa [kuˈzej lefˈkoʃa]; Greek: Βόρεια Λευκωσία, romanized: Vóreia Lefkosía) is the largest settlement and the de facto capital of Northern Cyprus. It is the northern part of the divided city of Nicosia, and is governed by the Nicosia Turkish Municipality. As of 2011, North Nicosia had a population of 61,378 and a metropolitan area with a population of 82,539.

The city is the economic, political and cultural centre of Northern Cyprus, with many shops, restaurants and shopping malls. It is home to a historic walled city, centred on the Sarayönü Square, and a modern metropolitan area, with the Dereboyu region as its centre of business and entertainment. Described as a city with high levels of welfare, it has seen great urban growth and development in the 21st century, including the construction of new highways and high-rises. It hosts a significant number of tourists and a variety of cultural activities, including its international festivals of theatre and music. With a student population over 34,000, North Nicosia is an important centre of education and research and is home to four universities, of which the Near East University is the biggest.

Following the intercommunal violence of the 1960s, the capital of the Republic of Cyprus was divided between the island's Greek Cypriot and Turkish Cypriot communities in the south and north respectively in 1963. A coup by the Greek military junta in an attempt to unite the island with Greece in 1974 led to the Turkish invasion of Cyprus, and the international community considers North Nicosia to have been under Turkish occupation since then.

== History ==
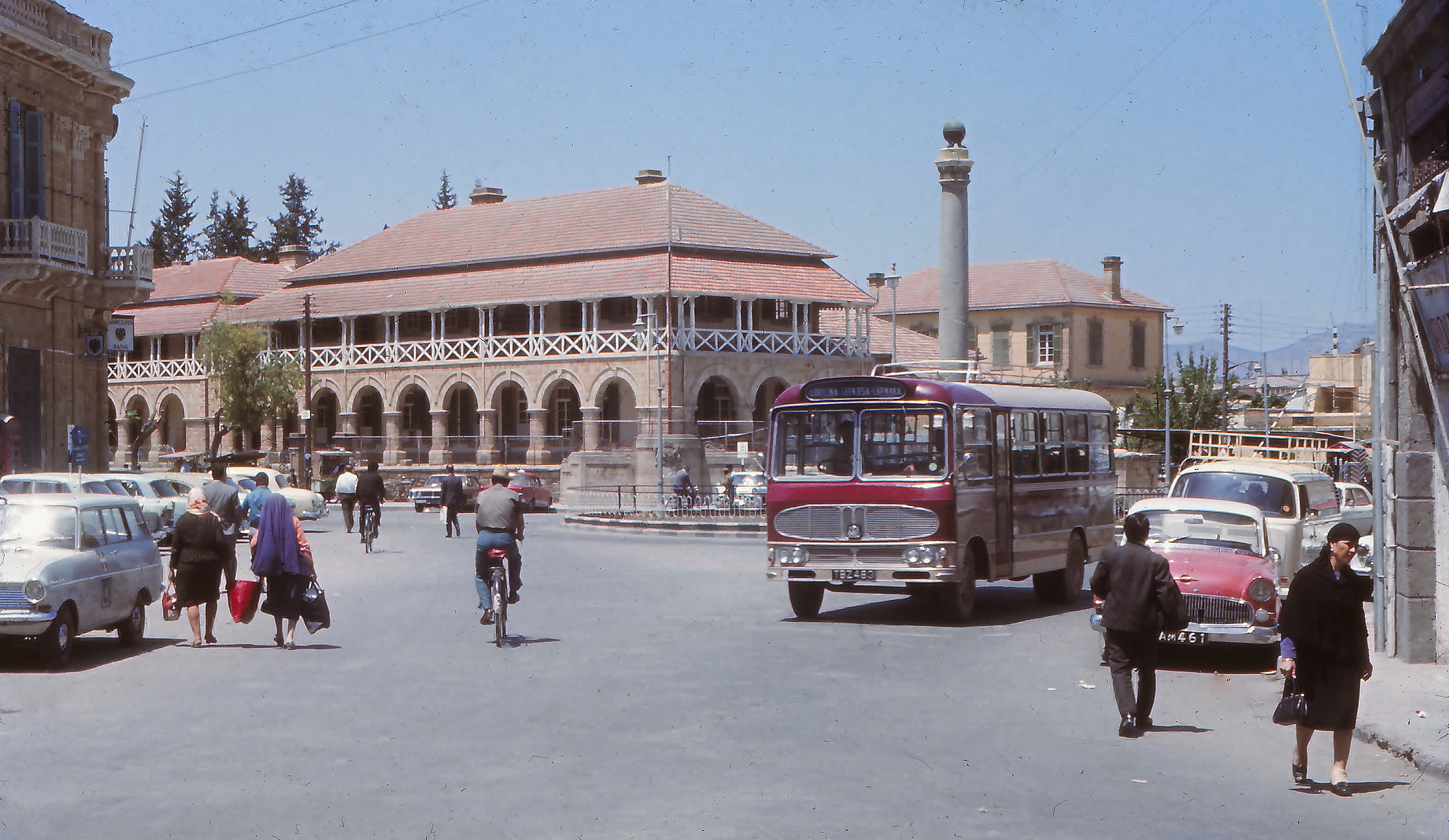
Sarayönü, 1969

During the Cyprus crisis of 1963–64, in the aftermath of unilateral constitutional changes by the Greek Cypriots, intercommunal violence broke out. Nicosia was divided into Greek and Turkish Cypriot quarters by the Green Line, named after the colour of the pen used by the United Nations officer to draw the line on a map of the city. This resulted in the ceasing of Turkish Cypriot participation in the government, and following more intercommunal violence in 1964, a number of Turkish Cypriots moved to the Turkish quarter of Nicosia, causing serious overcrowding.

On 15 July 1974, there was an attempted coup d'état led by the Greek military junta to unite the island with Greece. The coup ousted Archbishop Makarios III as President of Cyprus, replacing him with pro-enosis nationalist Nikos Sampson. In response to the prospect of enosis, on 20 July 1974, the Turkish Army invaded the island, and from then occupied the 37% of the north part of the Republic of Cyprus. The invasion included two phases. The second phase was performed on 14 August 1974, where the Turkish Army advanced their positions, eventually capturing a total of 37% of Cypriot territory, including the northern part of Nicosia and the cities of Kyrenia and Famagusta.

On 23 April 2003, the Ledra Palace crossing was opened through the Green Line, the first time that crossing was allowed since 1974. This was followed by the opening of Ayios Dometios crossing point on 9 May 2003. On 3 April 2008, the Ledra Street crossing was also reopened.

== Administration ==
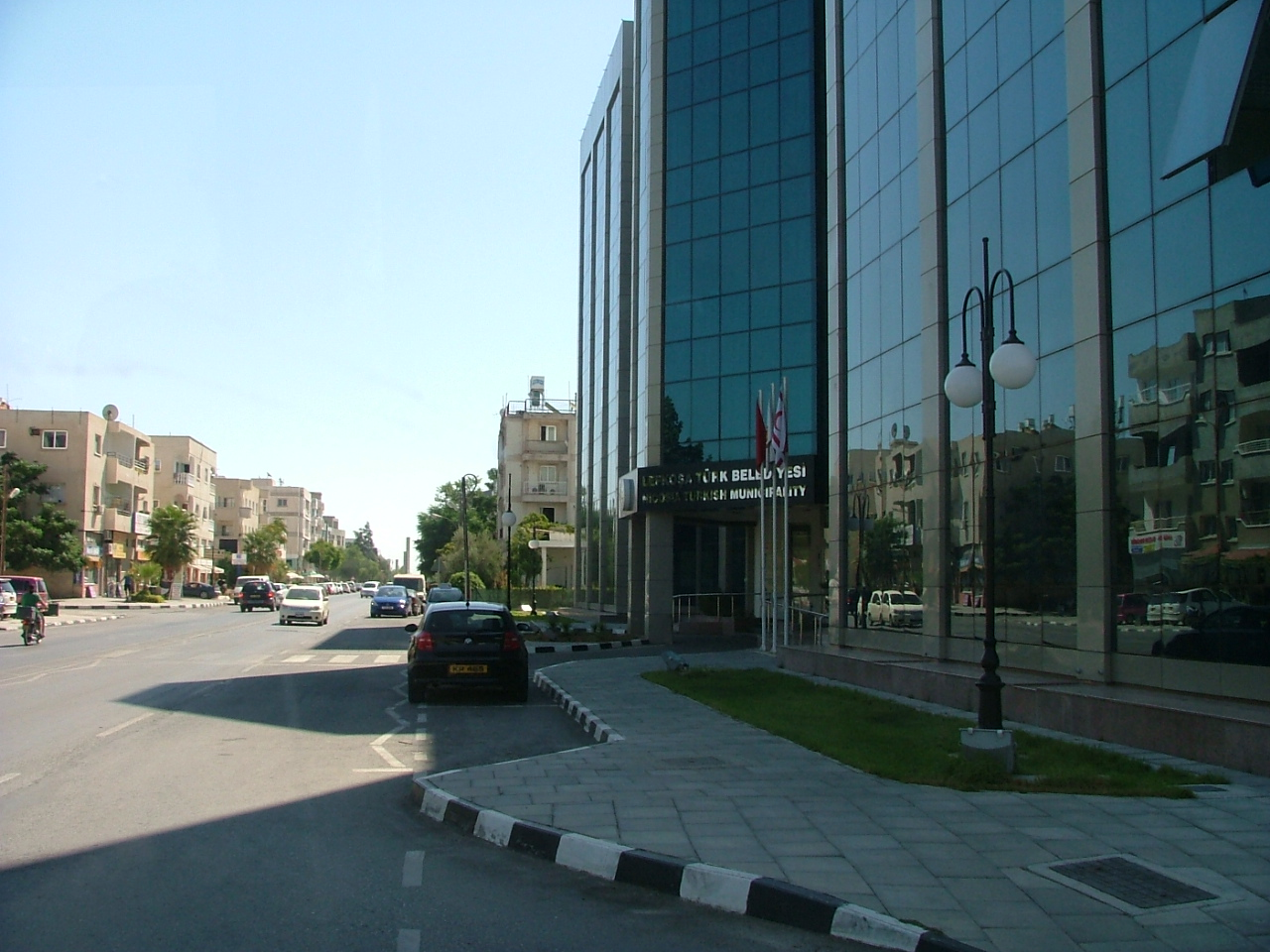
City hall of North Nicosia, August 2009

As the capital, North Nicosia is Northern Cyprus's political, economic and cultural centre. North Nicosia hosts the ministries of Northern Cyprus. The city is governed by the Nicosia Turkish Municipality, which is recognised by the constitution of the Republic of Cyprus.

The Nicosia Turkish Municipality is headed by the mayor, Mehmet Harmancı from the Communal Democracy Party (TDP). He came to power in the local elections in 2014 with 38% of the popular vote, defeating the candidates of two major parties who were considered to be candidates with the highest chances by the Turkish Cypriot media in a feat that was seen as a major surprise victory. The organisation of the municipality features a 22-member City Council, composed of 8 councillors from the Republican Turkish Party (CTP), 6 from the National Unity Party (UBP), 6 from the Communal Democracy Party, 1 from the Democratic Party (DP-UG) and 1 from the New Cyprus Party (YKP).

=== Mayors of Nicosia Turkish Municipality ===
Below is a list of mayors of the Nicosia Turkish Municipality since its establishment in 1958:

- Tahsin Gözmen: 1958–1962
- Cevdet Mirata: 1962–1962
- Fuat Celalettin: 1962–1968
- Ziver Kemal: 1969–1976
- Mustafa Akıncı: 1976–1990
- Burhan Yetkili: 1990–1994
- Şemi Bora: 1994–2002
- Kutlay Erk: 2002–2006
- Cemal Metin Bulutoğluları: 2006–2013
- Kadri Fellahoğlu: 2013–2014
- Mehmet Harmancı: 2014–present

=== Quarters ===
Nicosia is divided into several administrative divisions known as mahalleler (singular: mahalle) or quarters. Each of these quarters are headed by a muhtar, who is elected by the residents in local elections. There are 25 quarters within the jurisdiction of the Nicosia Turkish Municipality, of which 12 are in the walled city and 13 are outside, and below is list of them sorted according to population according to the 2011 census:

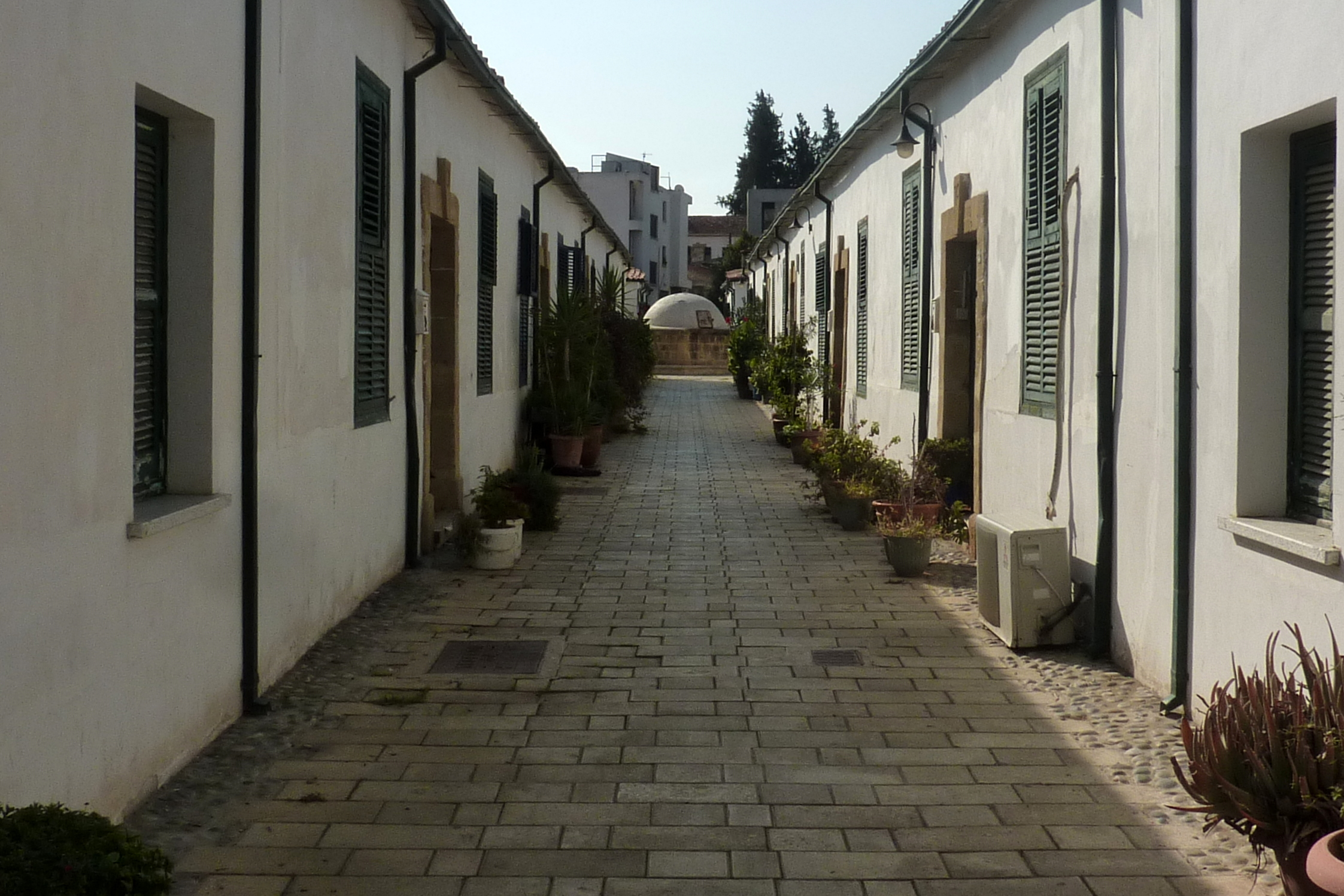
The historical Samanbahçe neighbourhood in the İbrahimpaşa quarter

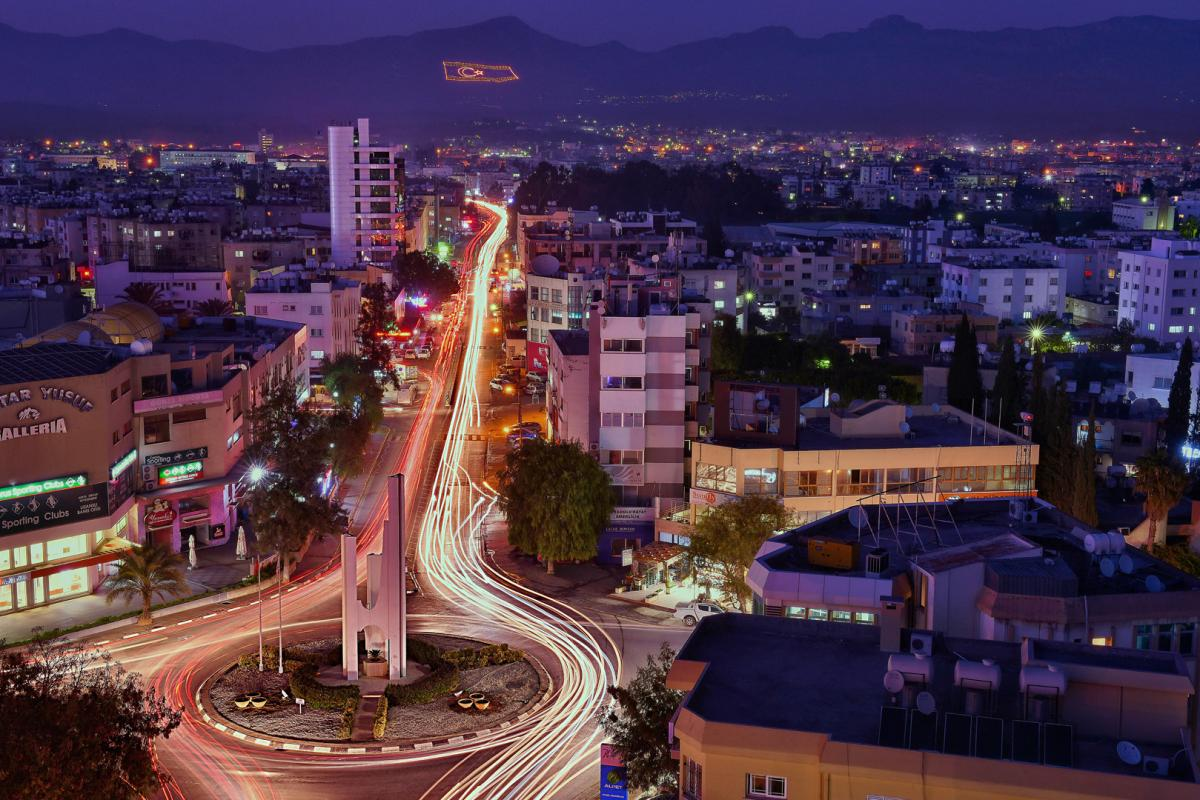
A view from the Yenişehir quarter

| Quarter | Population |
|---|---|
| Küçük Kaymaklı | 10,572 |
| Ortaköy | 8,868 |
| Hamitköy | 5,338 |
| Haspolat | 4,204 |
| Taşkınköy | 3,847 |
| Yenişehir | 3,715 |
| Kızılay | 3,535 |
| Marmara | 3,081 |
| Göçmenköy | 3,003 |
| Köşklüçiftlik | 2,939 |
| Aydemet | 2,314 |
| Kumsal | 1,855 |
| Yenicami | 1,663 |
| Çağlayan | 1,307 |
| Selimiye | 878 |
| Akkavuk | 793 |
| Abdi Çavuş | 568 |
| İbrahimpaşa | 566 |
| Arabahmet | 561 |
| Ayluka | 489 |
| Karamanzade | 351 |
| Mahmutpaşa | 314 |
| Kafesli | 233 |
| İplikpazarı | 229 |
| Haydarpaşa | 155 |

== Cityscape ==
=== The walled city ===
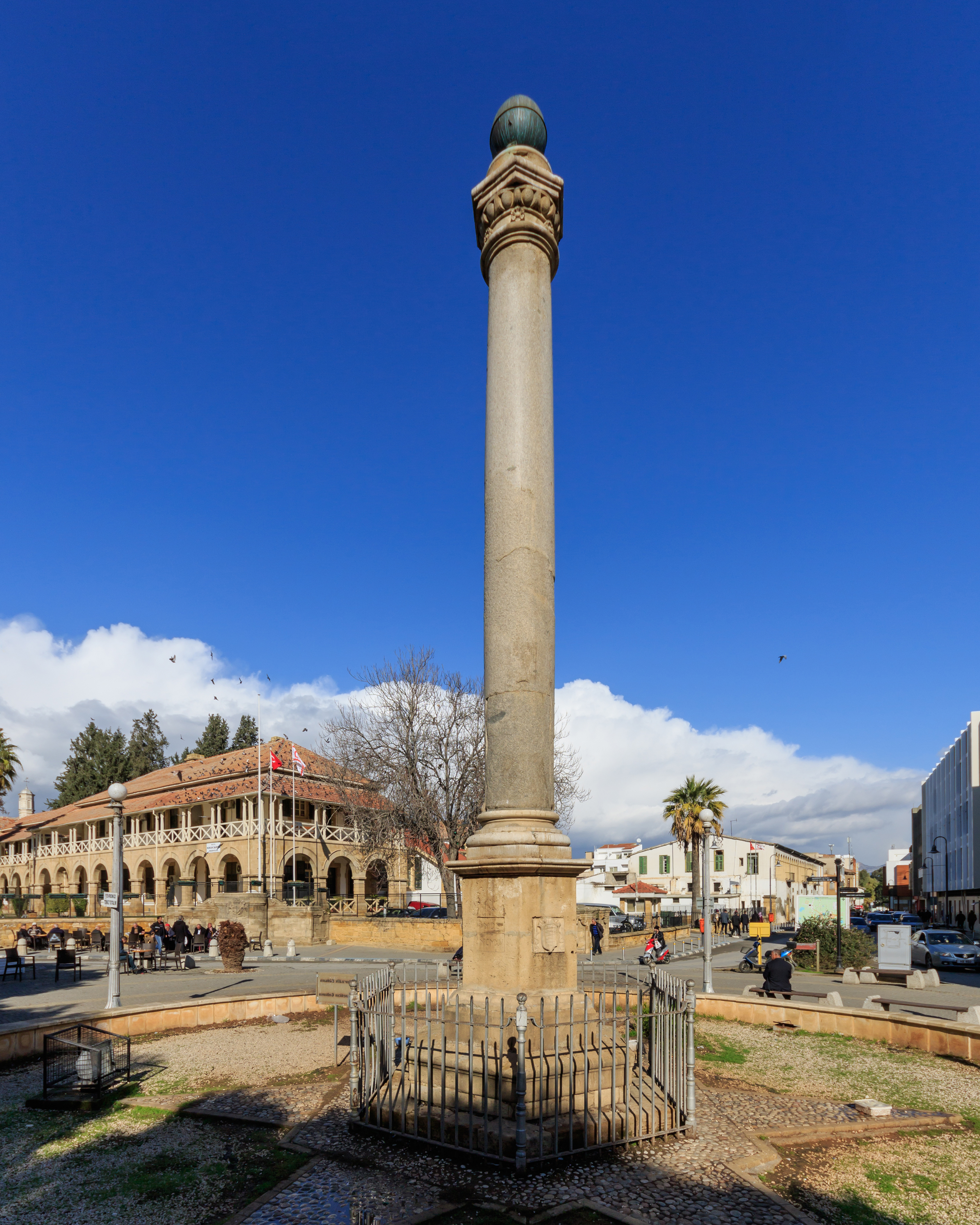
Sarayönü

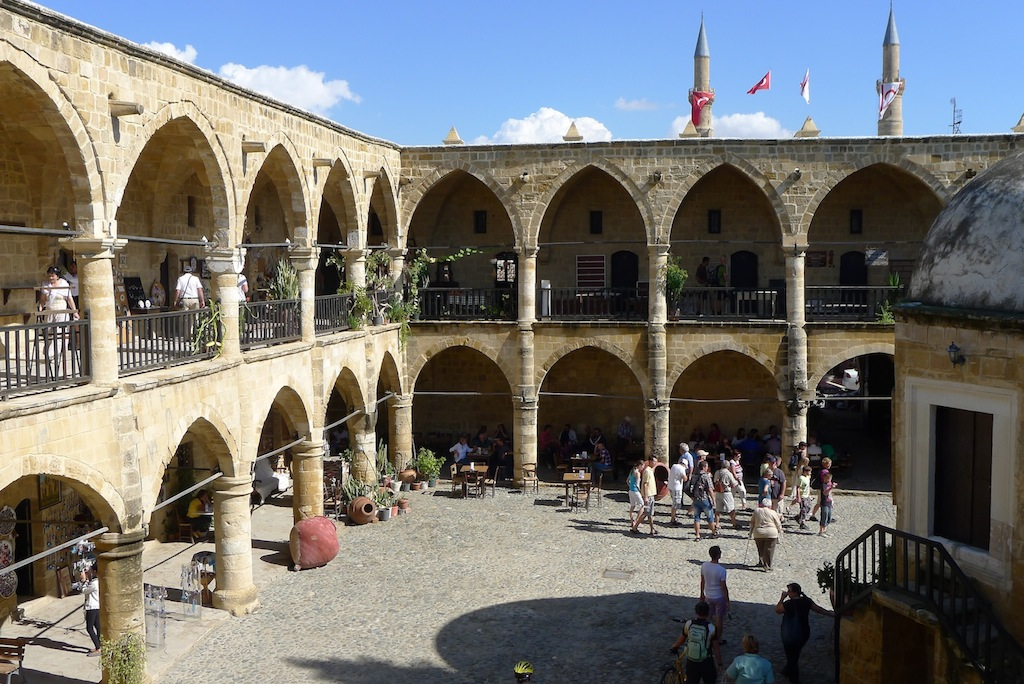
The Büyük Han

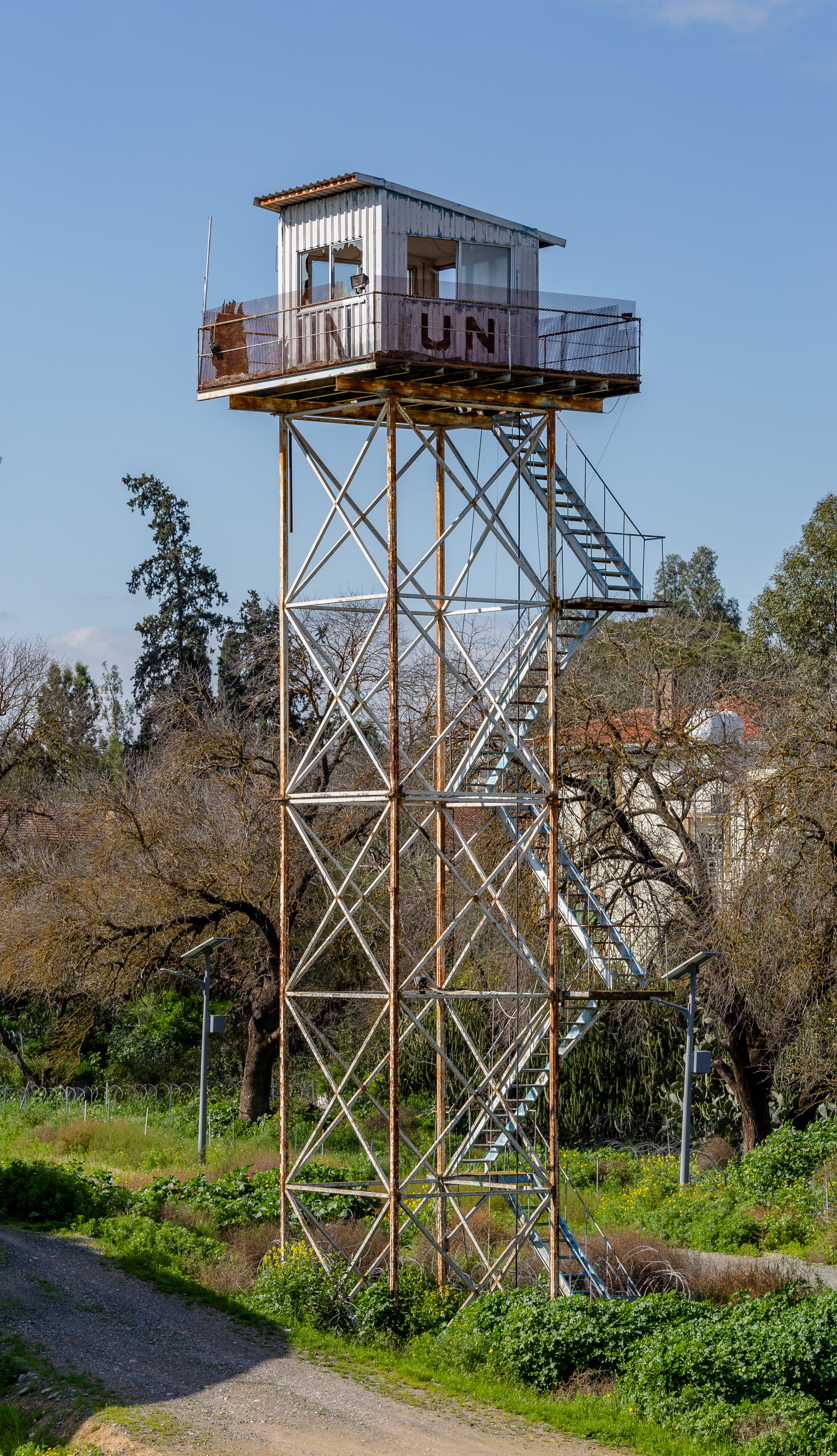
UN tower in the buffer zone

The northern part of the walled city of Nicosia is richer in historical buildings and cultural works than the south, with its Selimiye quarter retaining its complete historical character and atmosphere. The walled city overall has been declared a protected area by the Turkish Cypriot Department of Antiquities, and 672 buildings and places of historical value have been registered in it.

At the centre of the walled city lies the Atatürk Square, widely known as Sarayönü. The square has been dubbed as "the heart of Nicosia" and historically has been the cultural center of the Turkish Cypriot community, with the visiting Turkish prime ministers having delivered speeches before and during the conflict in Cyprus. It still hosts mass rallies during political campaigns and the headquarters of the National Unity Party. In the middle of the square stands the Venetian Column, known simply as "the Obelisk" ("Dikiltaş") to the locals and symbolic of the country's government. The column was brought from the ancient city of Salamis by the Venetians in 1550. The coats of arms of six Italian noble families still remains at the bottom of the column, even though the statue of the lion on it has been replaced with a copper ball. The square used to be the seat of a Lusignan palace, which was replaced with the present-day law courts by the British government.

The Girne Avenue connects Sarayönü to the Kyrenia Gate and the İnönü Square in front of it. The avenue has been described as "the symbol of the walled city", and is filled with numerous shops and restaurants. A project is underway as of 2015 to redesign the area with a better infrastructure, visual quality and accessibility.

Near the entrance of the walled city, to the west of the Girne Avenue, lies the Samanbahçe neighbourhood, built in the 19th century by the government, considered to be the first example of social housing in the island. The houses are uniform and contiguous, and in the center of the neighbourhood is a historic fountain. Still a residential area, the neighbourhood is considered to be one of the best representations of the Cypriot culture.

Further south, next to the Ledra Street checkpoint, is the Arasta area. The area was pedestrianised in 2013 and is home to a network of historic shopping streets, reflecting an eastern shopping tradition with food and traditional items. The area is frequented by tourists.

Nearby Büyük Han, the largest caravanserai in the island and considered to be one of the finest buildings in Cyprus, was built in 1572 by the Ottomans. The building has 68 rooms and a small mosque in the middle, and currently functions as a tourist-frequented cultural centre, with souvenir and handicraft shops, cafés with traditional food and cultural activities such as small-scale opera concerts. Just across from the road is the Kumarcılar Hanı (Gamblers' Inn), built in the 17th century as a typical example of Ottoman trading inns.

Another central point in the walled city is the Selimiye Mosque, originally built as the St. Sophia Cathedral. The mosque is the chief religious centre in Northern Cyprus. It was built between 1209 and 1228 by the Latin Church of Cyprus, in a Gothic style resembling French cathedrals. Its columns are older, from the Roman era, indicating the possible presence of a Byzantine church before its construction. It used to be the place of coronation of Lusignan kings, and was converted to the largest mosque in the island by the Ottomans in 1571. It remains as a chief landmark of the city. Next to the mosque is the Bedesten, a large Greek church in the Byzantine and Gothic styles, built in the 6th and 14th centuries. It was used as a marketplace in the Ottoman era. Today, it is used as a cultural centre where various cultural activities such as concerts and festivals take place. The two buildings overlook a square, named the Selimiye Square, which also hosts cultural activity and occasional dance shows. The Library of Sultan Mahmud II, which hosts manuscripts in Turkish, Arabic and Persian that are over 500 years old and considered fine examples of calligraphy, is also located in the Selimiye Square.

Among the quarters of the old city are Yenicami and Arabahmet. Yenicami hosts the Haydar Pasha Mosque that used to be the second largest church in the city before its conversion by the Ottomans, and with its Gothic architecture, it is home to richly carved doorways. The Arabahmet neighbourhood hosts the Arabahmet Mosque, which was built in 1845.

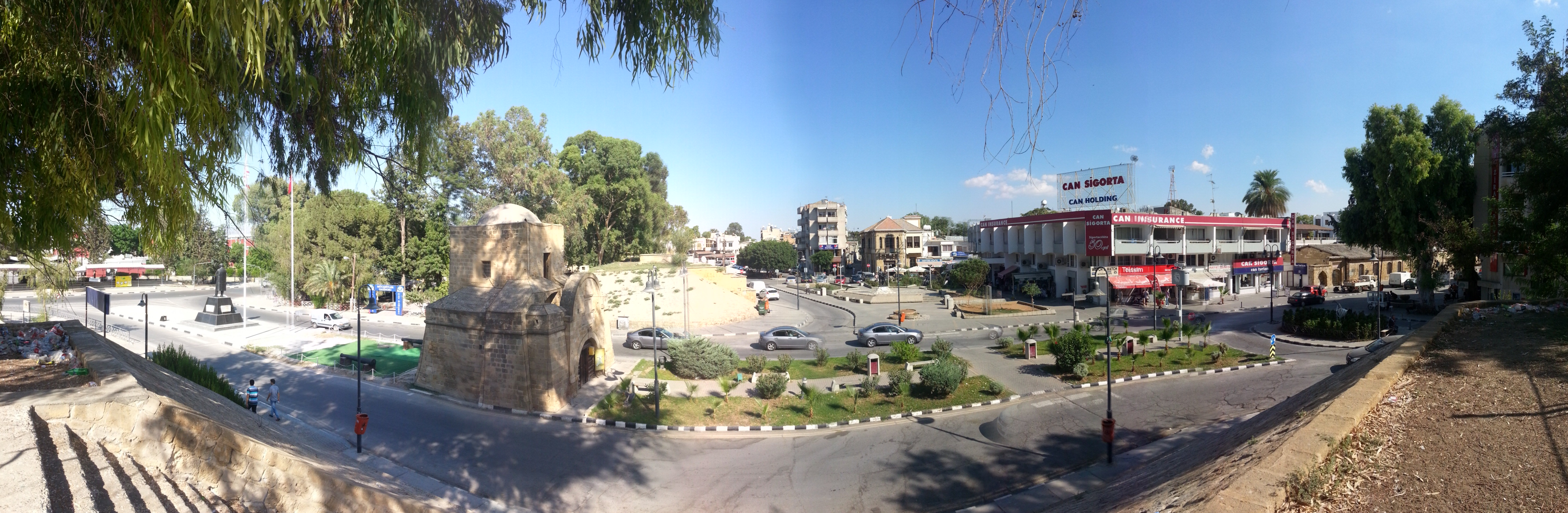
The Kyrenia Gate and the İnönü Square, at the entrance of the walled city

=== Metropolitan area ===
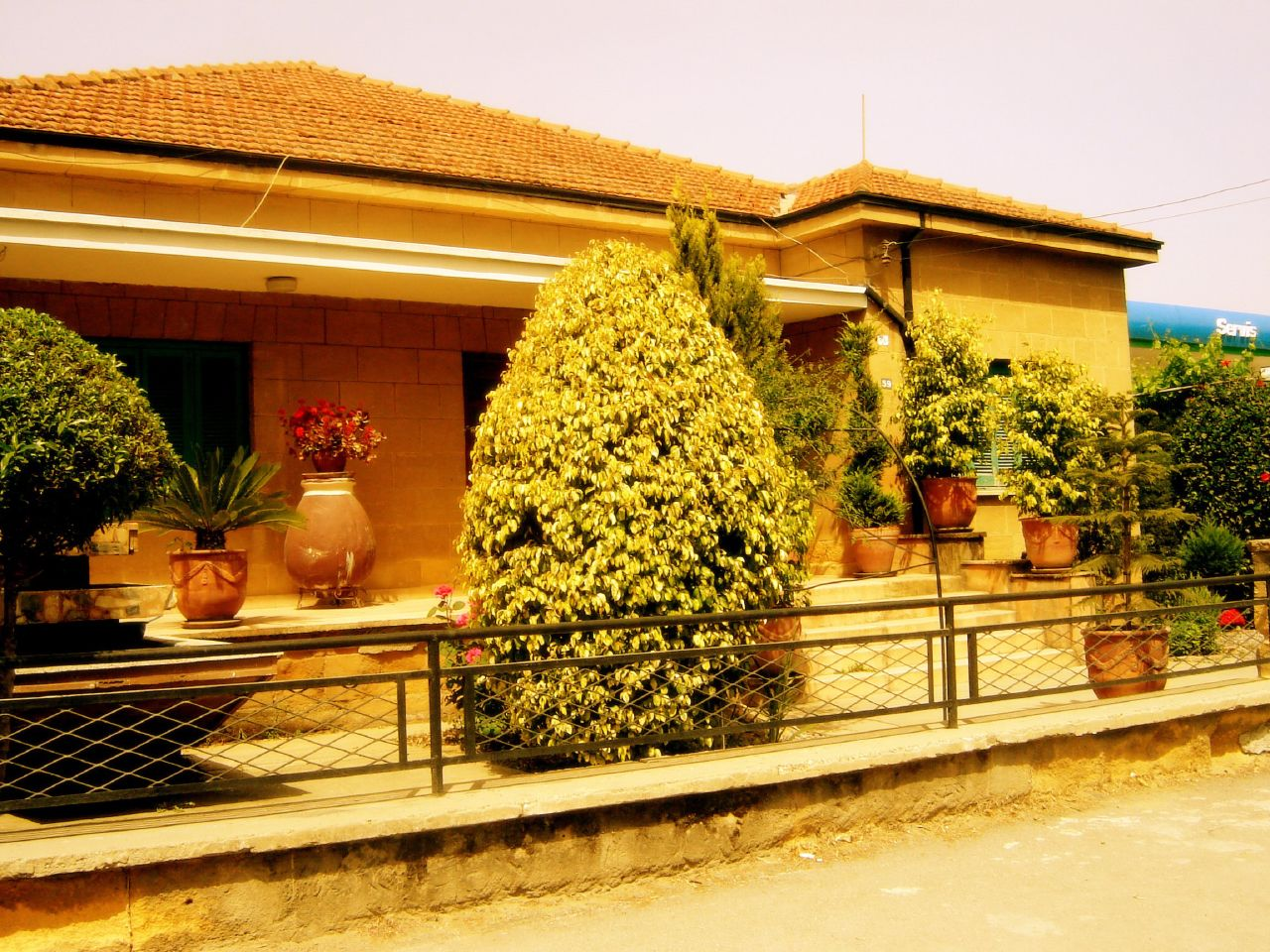
A classical house from the colonial period in Köşklüçiftlik

Outside the walled city, North Nicosia has expanded to become a large city, with an urban area that has absorbed the neighbouring town of Gönyeli and the former village of Hamitköy that is part of the Nicosia Turkish Municipality. The larger North Nicosia metropolitan area by definition includes the Haspolat region which is also considered to be a part of the city proper as it is within the Nicosia Turkish Municipality jurisdiction, the municipality of Alayköy and the village of Kanlıköy under the jurisdiction of Gönyeli, where North Nicosia is projected to grow. The metropolitan area has an area of 165.2 square kilometres.

The quarters of Nicosia outside the walled city are more spacious than the walled city, with wider roads and junctions. These areas are characterised by multi-floor concrete buildings. In the outskirts of the city, a number large and imposing villas have been built that belong to the middle and upper-classes. Upper and middle class Turkish Cypriots have left the walled city to settle in areas such as Küçük Kaymaklı and Hamitköy, which have seen a corresponding boom in economic and commercial activity. As the city started to expand out of the walled city in the first half of the city, large and imposing houses were built in the Köşklüçiftlik and Çağlayan areas, which characterise these central quarters today. The Yenişehir quarter was planned by the British administration in the 1940s in an optimal design to minimise distances and allow healthy social interaction, and the quarter is still considered as a masterpiece of city planning in Cyprus.

== Demographics ==
North Nicosia is mainly inhabited by Turkish Cypriots and Turkish settlers (including migrant workers). Turkish settlers make up the majority of the population in the walled city, while Turkish Cypriots predominantly inhabit the areas of the city outside the walls. Turkish Cypriots follow a more secularised lifestyle than the more conservative settlers, leading to tension between the communities. However, in the 2010s, a significant number of settled workers in the walled city left Northern Cyprus.

Historically, Turkish Cypriots had concentrated to the north of the riverbed and Greek Cypriots to the south. The Green Line was drawn to separate the Turkish quarters of the city from the Greek quarters, and 7000 Turkish Cypriots, around 30% of the Turkish population of Greater Nicosia, were displaced from quarters of the walled city and some suburbs such as Küçük Kaymaklı/Omorphita. North Nicosia also received a great number of displaced Turkish Cypriots from surrounding villages. The Göçmenköy quarter (literally meaning "village of the displaced") was founded to resettle these displaced people. The Arab Ahmet quarter had had an Armenian Cypriot presence since the Ottoman conquest; having been a minority until the 1920s, they constituted the overwhelming majority of the area by the 1950s. 200 Armenians from Arab Ahmet, Köşklüçiftlik and Kumsal fled the quarter during the inter-communal violence of 1963. Greek Cypriots fled from the Ayluka/Ayios Loukas quarter in 1963, and from the Trachones/Kızılbaş and Küçük Kaymaklı/Omorphita quarters in 1974. The number of Greek Cypriots displaced from these quarters in 1974 was around 4700.

== Economy ==
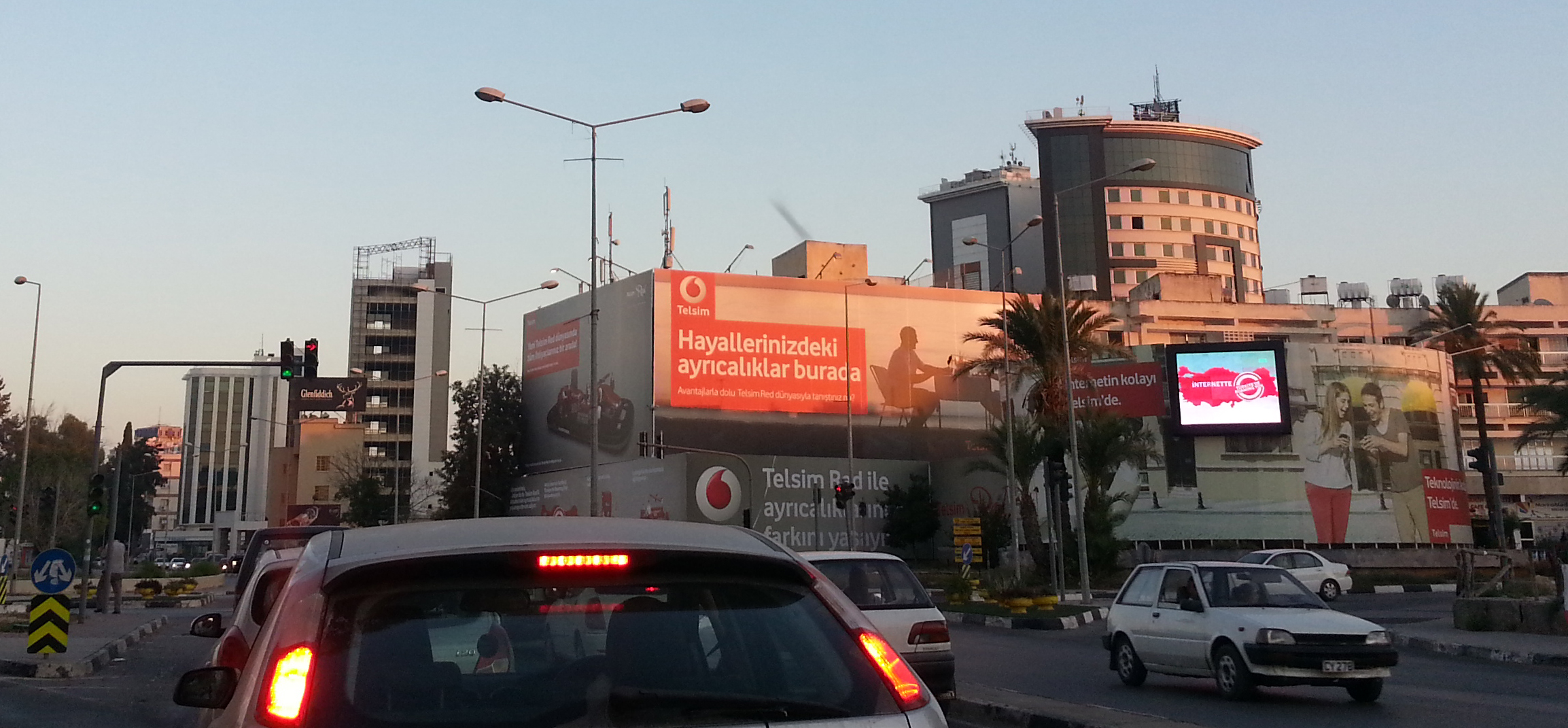
A central point in the city where the Dereboyu Avenue and the Bedrettin Demirel Avenue intersect

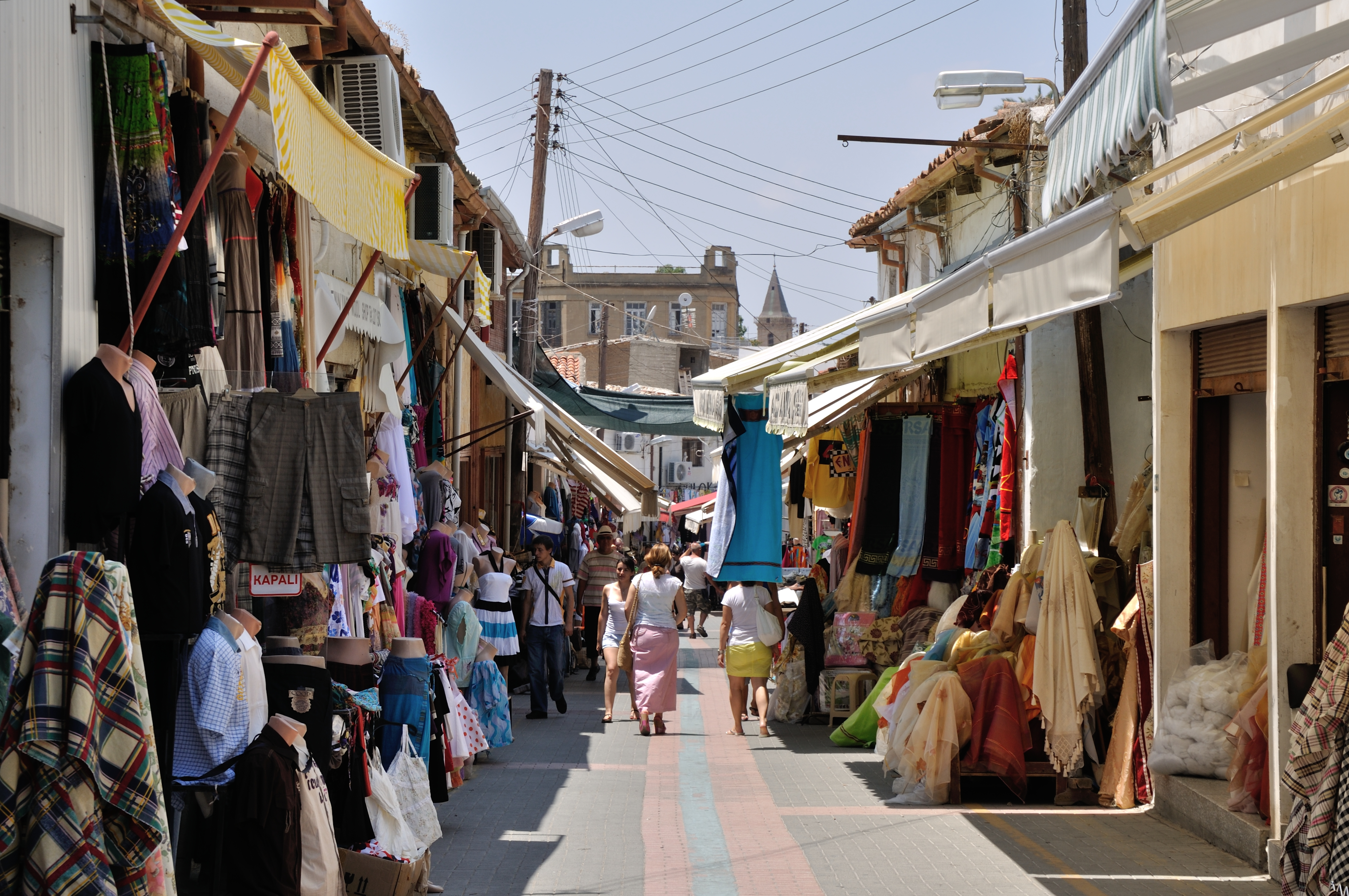
The Arasta region next to the Ledra Street checkpoint functions like a typical eastern bazaar and is popular with tourists

North Nicosia is the financial and economic centre of Northern Cyprus. In 2012, Lefkoşa District had 39.9% of the workplaces and 49.5% of the employees in Northern Cyprus. The Central Bank of Northern Cyprus is located on the Bedrettin Demirel Avenue. The city has seen great urban growth in the last decades, but the authorities have been criticised over the lack of city planning. Between 2008 and 2010, the construction rates in the North Nicosia urban area grew by 23.9%, with the largest boom observed in the construction of new industrial facilities in the city, which grew by 87.5% over two years. North Nicosia also grew in importance as a centre of commerce as the construction of offices grew by 74.2%. Recently, programmes have been put to place to regulate the growth of the city that has expanded uncontrollably. North Nicosia has been identified as a city with a high amount of development and welfare.

One aspect of North Nicosia that gives it the advantage for economical growth is its central position in Northern Cyprus, where transport links from Kyrenia, Famagusta and Morphou intersect. North Nicosia is home to the Nicosia International Fair and an Organised Industrial Area, where many businesses and manufacturers are located. Their location, along with other facilities such as the large sports complex, were chosen to be on the connection between the highways linking Morphou to Famagusta. North Nicosia hugely influences the economy of the surrounding district, as far as the Ercan International Airport, along with Dikomo in the Girne District.

The economy in the walled city has stagnated through the 2000s and 2010s, with the central Municipal Market losing its popularity, even though it has started to receive investment as of 2014 and programs have been put to place to reinvigorate the region with cultural activities being organised. In 2014, the Arasta shopping region close to the Ledra Street crossing was pedestrianised, which increased the popularity of the area.

Tourism is an important sector of the economy. In 2012, North Nicosia hosted more than 146,000 tourists, accounting for 13.8% of the total touristic stays in Northern Cyprus. In 2008, after the opening of the Ledra Street crossing, the Arasta area saw an influx of visitors as around 2300 Greek Cypriots and tourists used the crossing to cross into the area daily. The city has seen the construction of large hotels in the late 2000s and early 2010s. The constructions have changed the city's skyline, with the newly constructed Merit Hotel on the Bedrettin Demirel Avenue and the Golden Tulip Hotel in the Dereboyu region being highly visible high-rises. The country's oldest hotel, the Saray Hotel was also renovated and each of the three hotels has its own casino, with a total capacity of around 700 people.

The city saw around 117 million Turkish liras of new construction in the year 2011 alone. In this year, a large amount of construction of dwellings was observed especially in the Hamitköy area and Gönyeli, which is part of the Nicosia urban area, but also in the regions of Küçük Kaymaklı and Aydemet region, indicating a residential growth in these areas.

== Culture ==
North Nicosia is home to cultural diversity. Students from different backgrounds in the universities celebrate their national festivals with activities, at which their national dances and traditions are performed. Different religious groups conduct cultural activities; the Alevi Cultural Association is headquartered in Nicosia.

=== Popular culture ===
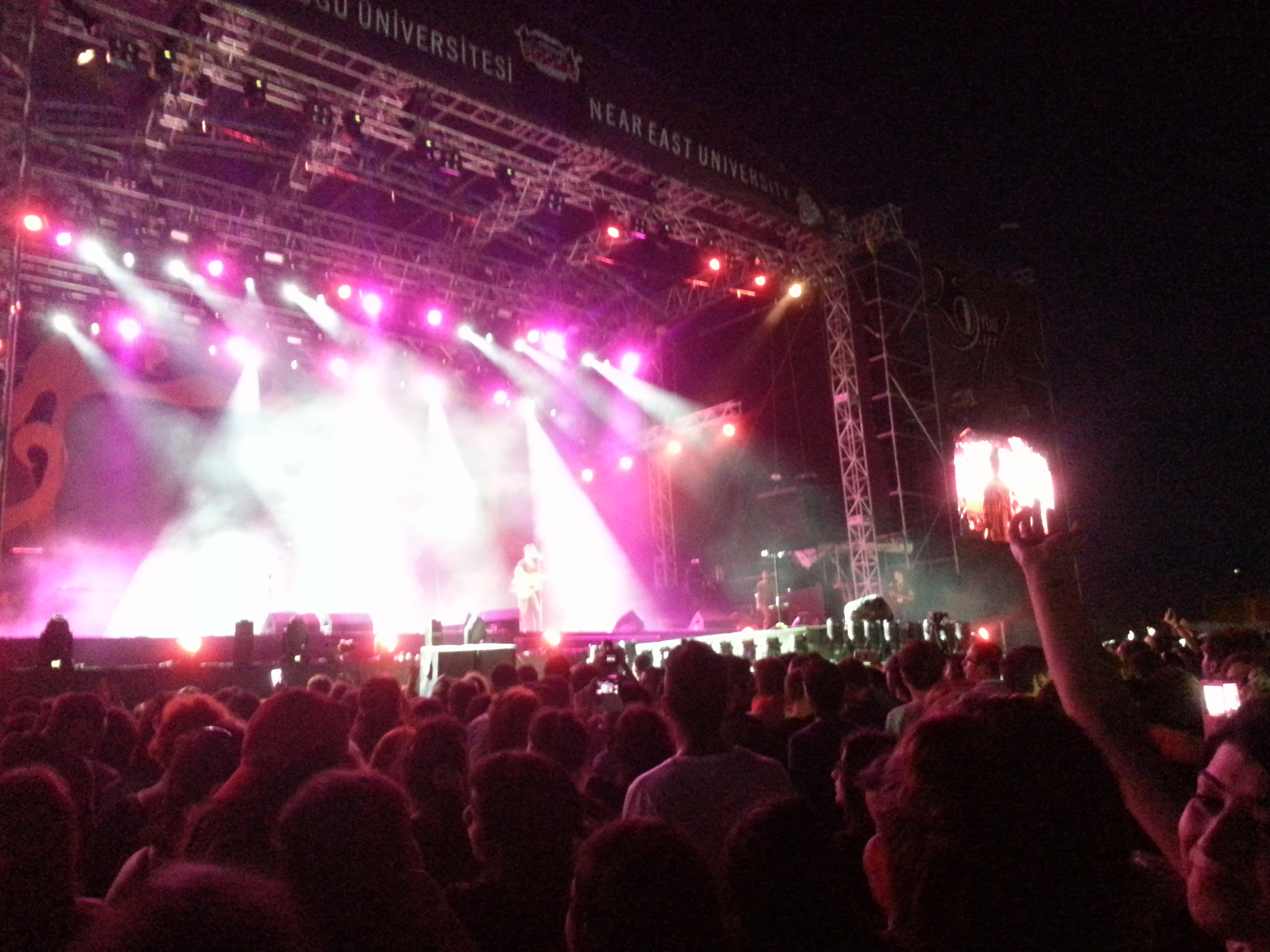
The 2014 Rock 'n Cyprus Festival

The Near East University annually holds a spring fest, during which famous Turkish Cypriot, Turkish and international singers and bands perform, dance festivals, sports and board game competitions are held. In 2014, the university built the Park Near East on an area of 220,000 square metres, and the concerts of Deep Purple and Turkish bands such as Yüksek Sadakat drew tens of thousands of spectators from Cyprus and Turkey. During the festival, the Moscow State Ballet also performed in the university. It also hosts the annual Rock 'n Cyprus festival, at which bands from Turkey perform, and organises the NEU Nicosia Carnival at the Dereboyu region of the city, at which the students display their culture and the locals crowd into the streets.

The city has hosted other musical organisations, such as the Shark Virgin Island Festival, which is the greatest electronic music organisation in the island. The Dereboyu region has become a centre of entertainment, where street parties, festivals and concerts of local bands and singers take place. The walled city has also seen investment in the recent years, with cultural centres and bars being opened. To reinvigorate the region, monthly street parties are organised.

=== Fine arts ===
The city has fine arts institutions at university levels, with the fine arts faculties of the Near East University and Cyprus International University. The universities contribute to the artistic culture of the city by participating in exhibitions and competitions, and students are involved in creating artistic depictions of Nicosia. In 2014, an arts and culture centre in the Arabahmet region was reopened with the contribution of the Girne American University. In 2013, a new exhibition hall was unveiled in the Near East University, whose students participate in organisations abroad.

Photography exhibitions and competitions take place in the city, organised by the state and private institutions alike. Traditional handicrafts are also actively practised, with exhibitions taking place.

=== Museums ===
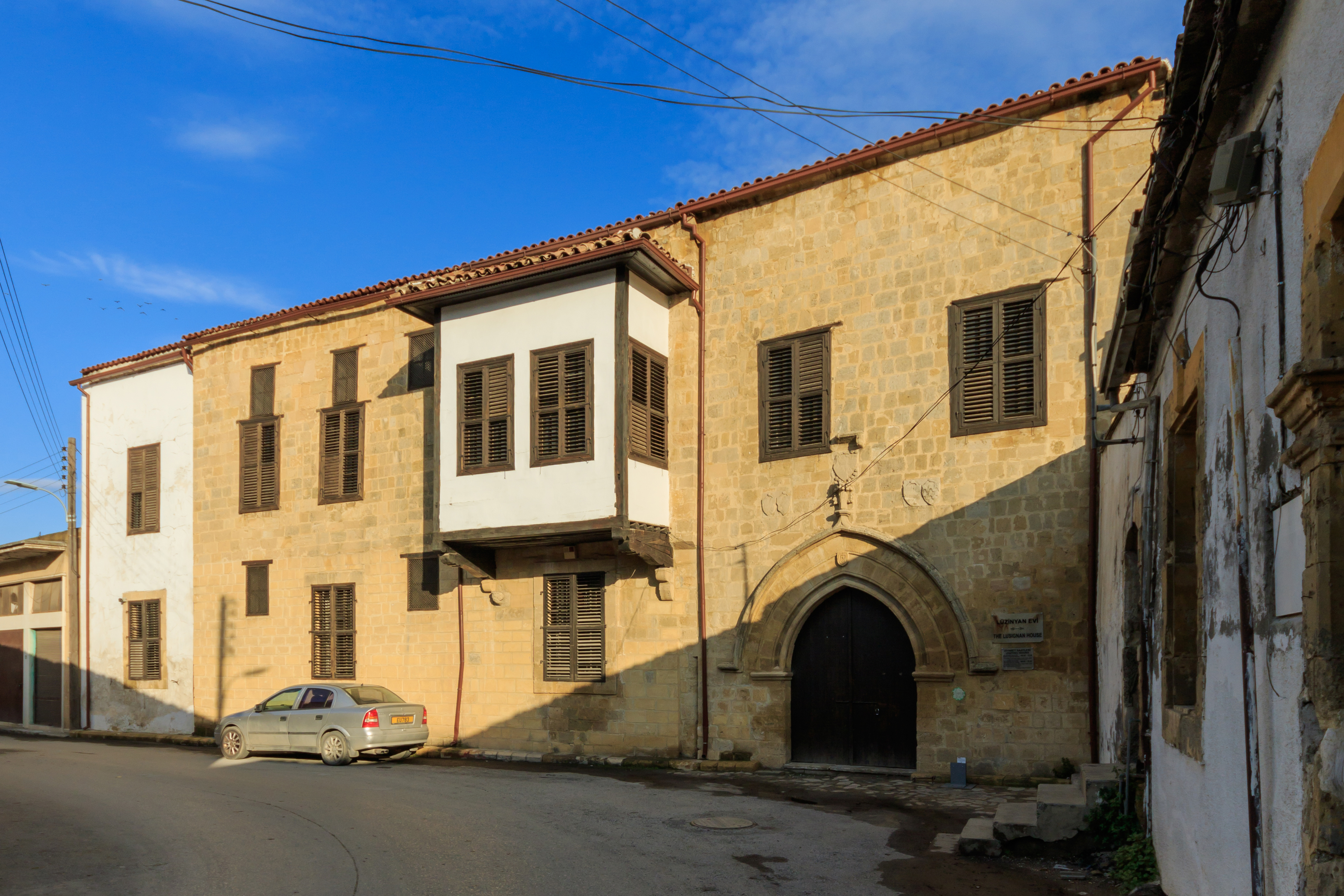
The Lusignan House

The city is home to a number of museums. The Dervish Pasha Mansion is similar in architecture to the Hadjigeorgakis Kornesios Mansion, reflecting typical late Ottoman urban architecture, and functions as an ethnographic museum today. It hosts artefacts relating to the Ottoman era and the archaeological history of Cyprus. Another example of a house preserved as such is the Lusignan House, reflecting the architecture of the Lusignan era and the Gothic style, and is furnished with Lusignan and Ottoman items.

The Mevlevi Tekke Museum used to be the headquarters of the Mevlevi sect, associated with the Whirling Dervishes. It was designed for purposes that are similar to monasteries, and now functions as an ethnographic museum as well, reflecting the rites of the sect.

The Lapidary Museum was originally built as a guesthouse for the pilgrims visiting the St. Sophia Cathedral (now the Selimiye Mosque). It hosts a collection of architectural artefacts and antiquities that have been excavated.

The Near East University campus is also home to three museums: the Communications Museum, the Art Museum and the Classical Cars Museum.

=== Performing arts ===
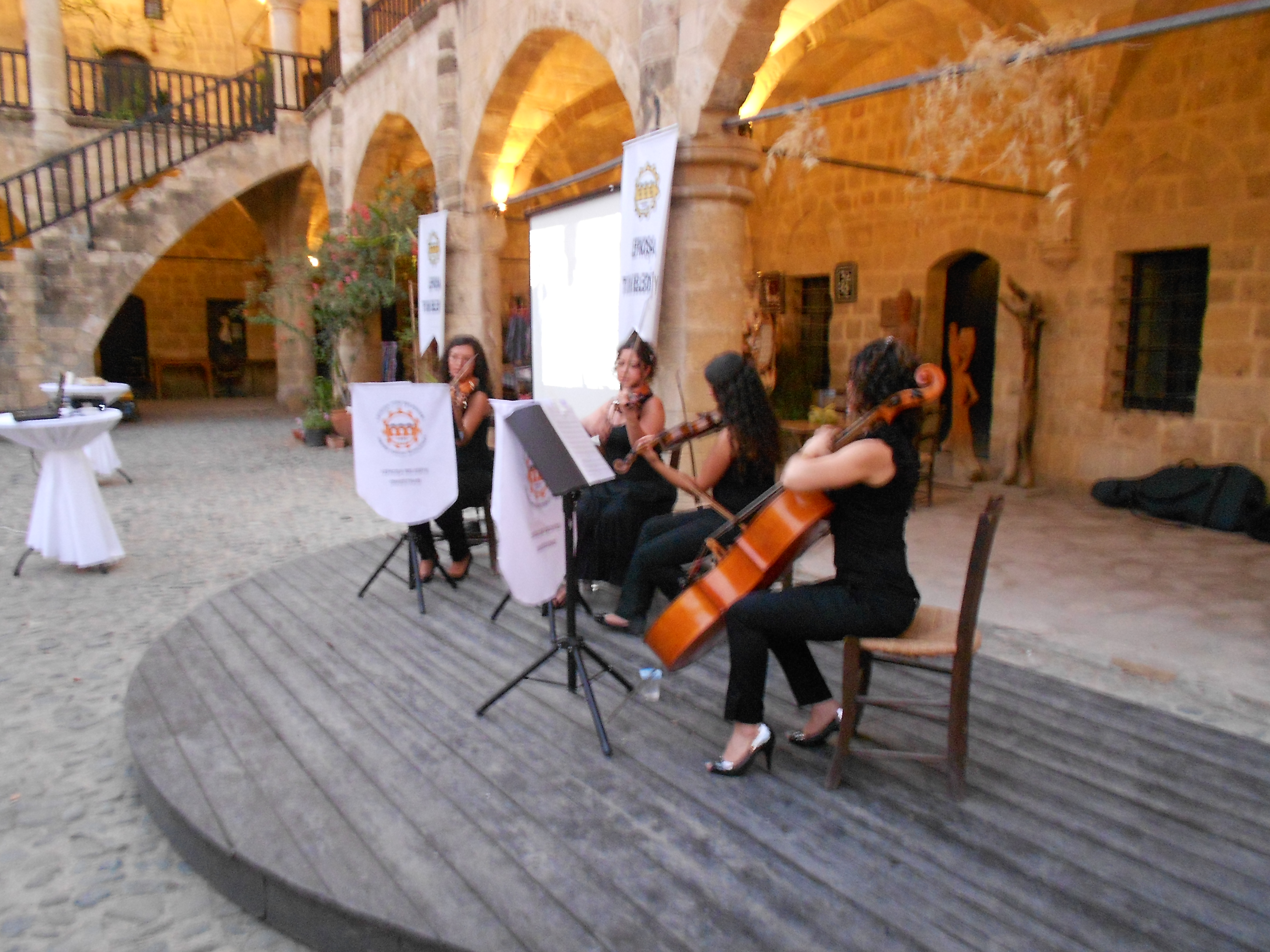
Members of the Lefkoşa Municipal Orchestra performing in Büyük Han

The Turkish Cypriot State Theatre and Nicosia Municipal Theater are headquartered in Nicosia and put on a number of plays each year. The Nicosia Turkish Municipality organises the Cyprus Theatre Festival annually, and prominent theatrical groups from Turkey as well as the Nicosia Municipal Theatre participate in the festival that takes place in the Atatürk Culture and Congress Centre of the Near East University. Theatre is very popular in Northern Cyprus, and as such, long queues form for the ticket sales of the festival, with the number of theatre-goers increasing every year. The Nicosia Municipal Theatre children as well and the Gönyeli municipality holds its own theatre workshop that puts on plays. Nicosia Artistic Theatre is another theatrical group that is active in the city.

Nicosia Turkish Municipality founded its Lefkoşa Municipal Orchestra in 1987. Since then, the orchestra has grown and developed several branches, including the Children's Choir, Folk Music Choir, Pop Orchestra, Latin Orchestra and the Chamber Music Orchestra, with about 90 participants, most of whom are volunteers. The orchestra frequently delivers concerts and participates in big musical festivals held in the country. At times, the orchestra delivers concerts at open spaces, such as parks and squares. It also holds composing contests. The Presidential Symphony Orchestra of Northern Cyprus, founded in 2015, is based in North Nicosia and as of 2018, the works for building a concert hall and headquarters for the orchestra are underway. The city is home to the annual Nicosia Walled City Jazz Festival, at which both local and Turkish jazz musicians take the stage.

The city hosts several folk dance groups, which organise annual festivals to perform Cypriot folk dances. The foreign students or delegations visiting universities perform their own traditional dances. The city hosts folk dance shows of children from other countries in the annual children's day on 23 April. North Nicosia annually hosts the Nicosia International Folk Dance Festival, where groups from various countries perform all around the city in parks and squares.

Several modern dance activities also take place in the city, where several dance schools are established. Internationally renowned musicals and dance shows are performed in front of crowded audiences in the Atatürk Culture and Congress Centre. In 2010, the city was part of the international Earthdance activity, which was witnessed by thousands of locals.

== Education ==
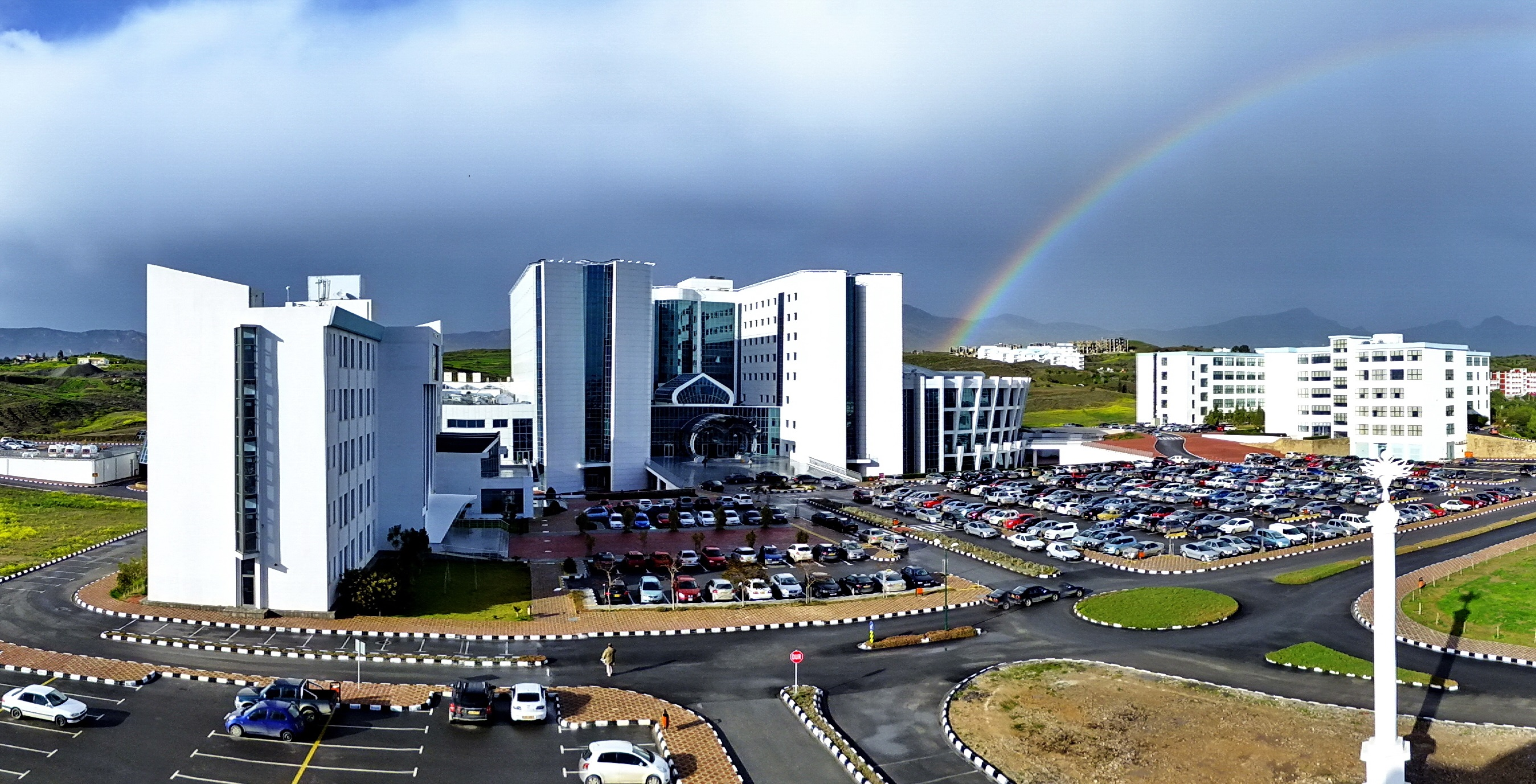
The Near East University Faculty of Medicine and the hospital

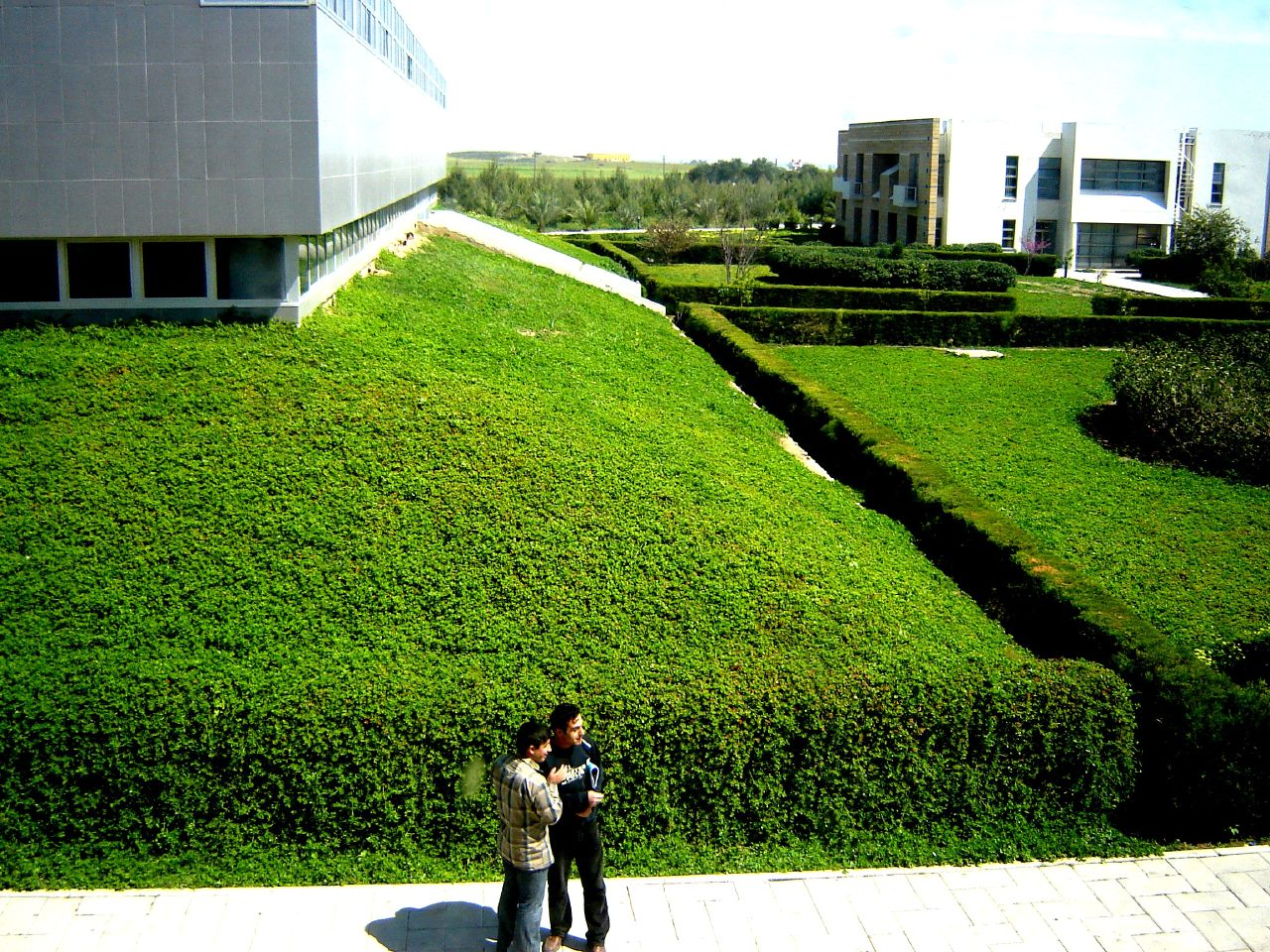
A view from the Cyprus International University campus

Nicosia is the seat of four Turkish Cypriot universities, namely the Near East University (NEU), Cyprus International University (CIU), University of Mediterranean Karpasia and the American University of Cyprus. It also hosts a campus of the Turkish Anadolu University, along with two vocational schools (Atatürk Academy of Teachers and the Police Academy) that are equivalent to universities. As of the 2014–2015 educational year, North Nicosia was home to a student population of over 34,000; Near East University is the largest university in Northern Cyprus with 25,068 students; Cyprus International University has 8324 students and the University of Mediterranean Karpasia has 632. The universities are home to great diversity, with the Near East University and Cyprus International University having students from 96 and 64 countries respectively.

The Near East University was founded in 1988 and its campus is a few kilometres away from Nicosia proper. The Cyprus International University followed in 1997 with a campus that is located at the Haspolat region, outside the proper city of Nicosia. The University of Mediterranean Karpasia was founded in 2011, and is located at a building in the Küçük Kaymaklı region, within the city of Nicosia.

The Near East University owns a supercomputer that ranks the 13th in the world and the first in the region in terms of computation speed and capacity, used to help universities from Turkey in their research along with the university itself, and has participated in the Large Hadron Collider experiment at CERN, as well as Ebola virus disease treatment research. The NEU has also locally developed and manufactured a completely solar energy-powered car and has research centers in topics ranging from tissue engineering to history. The Cyprus International University is home to eight research centers. Examples of research conducted include excavations that have uncovered the earliest human bones that have ever been found in Cyprus and possible devices that could be implanted on the human body to facilitate communication.

The Grand Library of the Near East University is home to over 1 million printed and 150 million electronic resources and is visited by more than 7000 people daily, and agreements have been signed to share these resources with Turkish institutions.

In the North Nicosia urban area there are 21 state-owned institutions that offer primary education, along with three special institutions for children with disabilities. The city hosts three kinds of high schools: state-owned highschools (lise) that teach in Turkish, state-owned "colleges" (kolej) that teach in English and private high schools. The Türk Maarif Koleji is a state-owned high school with over 1000 students that teaches in English, was established in 1964 and prepares students for the British educational system. The private high schools in Nicosia are the Near East College, the Levent College and the TED College. There are also the state-owned Anadolu High School of Fine Arts and four vocational high schools.

== Transport ==
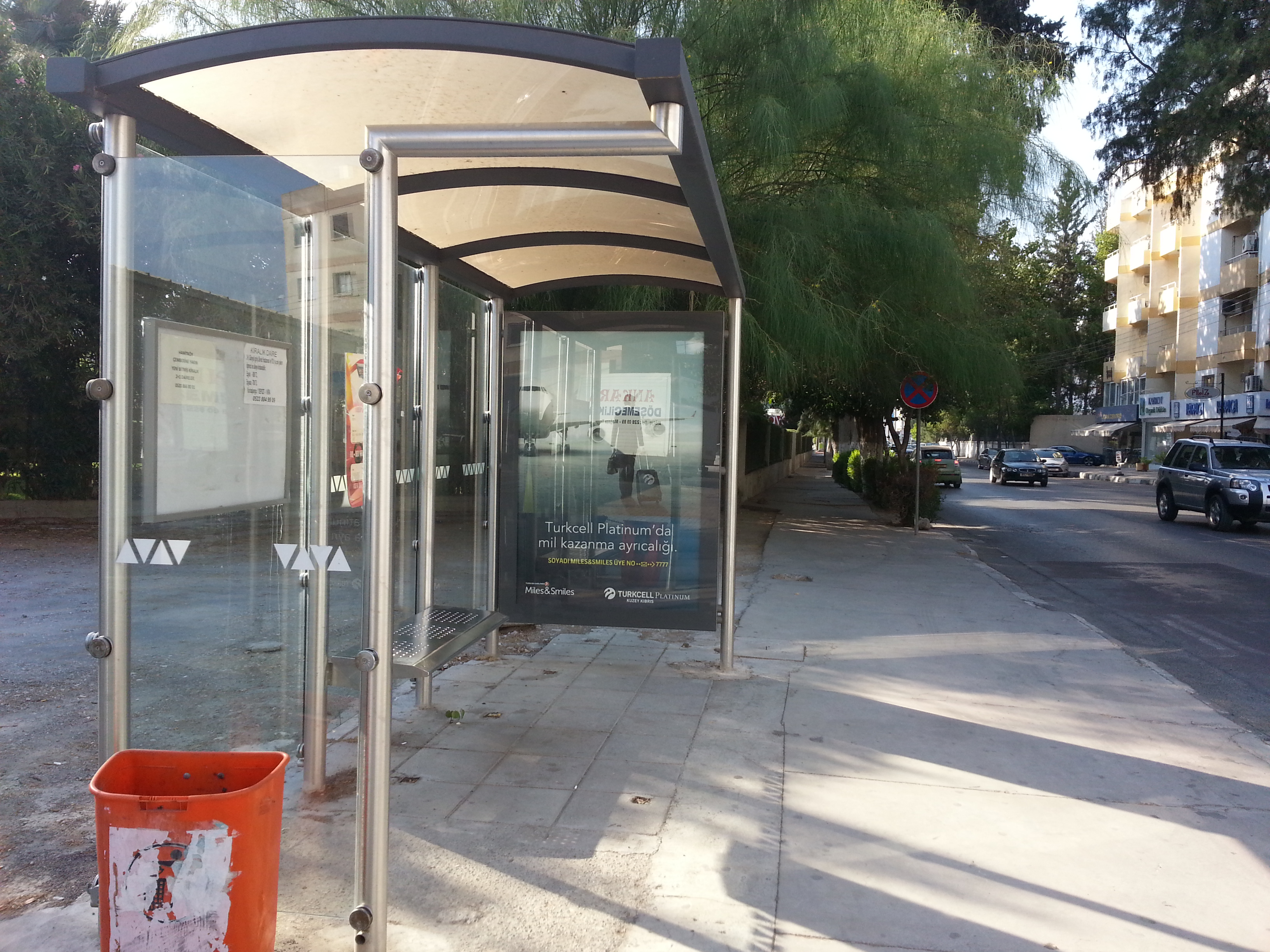
A bus stop on Bedrettin Demirel Avenue

North Nicosia is a major transport hub in Northern Cyprus, where the highways from the other major cities of Northern Cyprus, Famagusta, Kyrenia and Morphou intersect. It is connected to the other cities with modern, four-lane highways: the D-30 highway from Morphou to Famagusta passes through Nicosia, D-25 to Kyrenia. Ercan International Airport has been used for international flights. There is no train or metro system nor plans to develop one. In 2011, plans to build a tram system were put forward but rejected, yet the popular opinion is strongly in favour of establishing one.

North Nicosia has seen the construction of new highways and roads recently to solve its traffic problem, including the construction of two ringroads in the 2010s. One of these links the Metehan area and indirectly the Dereboyu region to Alayköy and indirectly the highway to Morphou, and was completed and opened to public traffic in 2014. The other one, the Nicosia Northern Ringroad, is currently under construction and will connect D-30 from Famagusta to Morphou directly to D-25 from Kyrenia, preventing the entry of vehicles from Kyrenia going to the airport and from Famagusta to Kyrenia, Gönyeli or Morphou into the city. While the construction stalled for a time due to land disputes, the work on the project recommenced in 2018.

The company of LETTAŞ provides bus services in North Nicosia. Buses are the only form of public transport available, and the system is considered unreliable due to the unplanned city growth, resulting in private cars being the primary means of transport. There is a bus terminal in the region of Yenişehir. The walled city has been facilitated to be easily navigable on foot, but the municipality has been criticised over the lack of a reliable system of public transport.

A bicycle-sharing system called Velespeed was introduced by the municipality in 2018. The system consists of 410 bicycles and stations for rental or drop-off placed across the city, within 15 minutes of cycling distance of one another.

== Sports ==
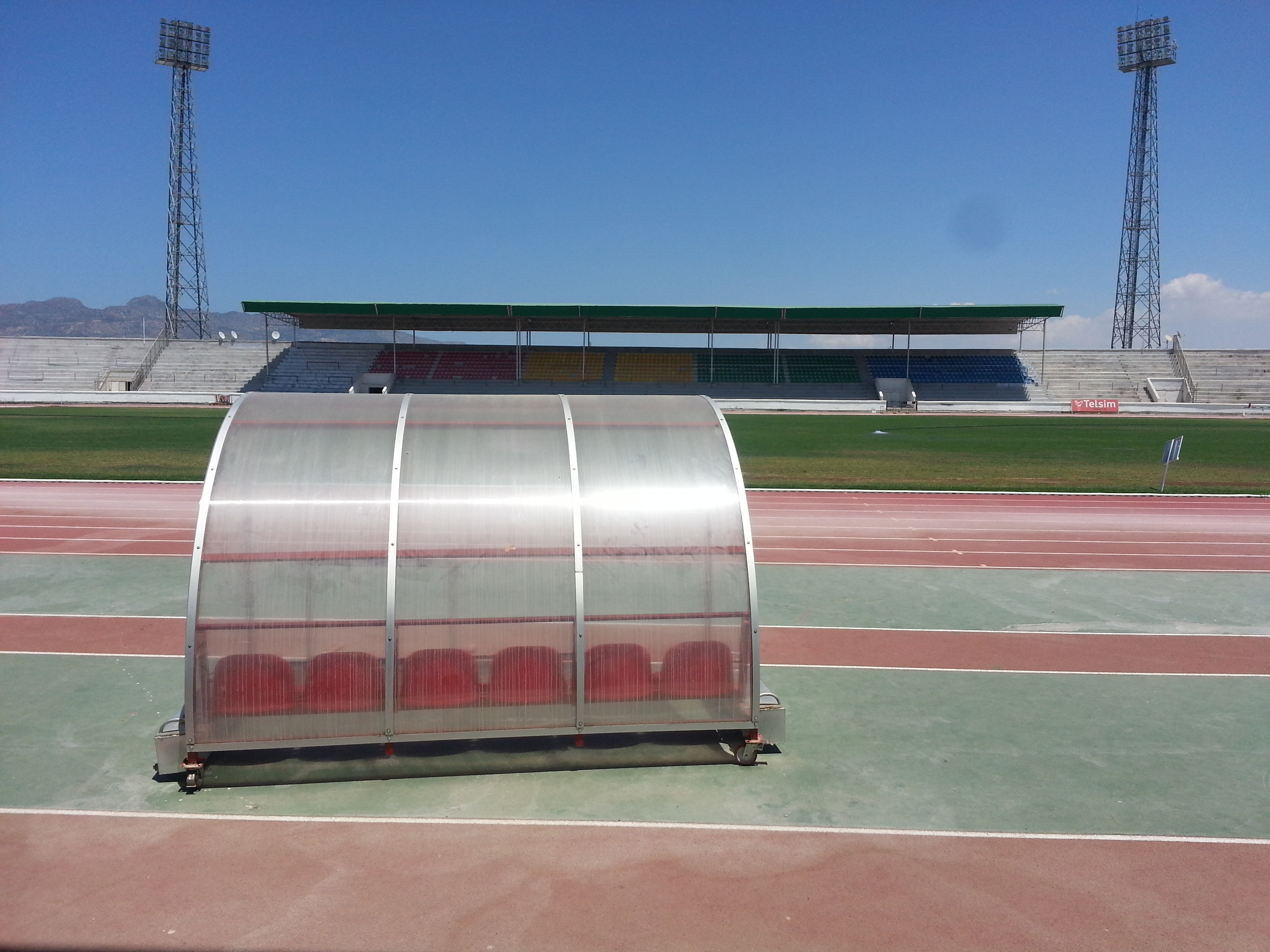
Nicosia Atatürk Stadium

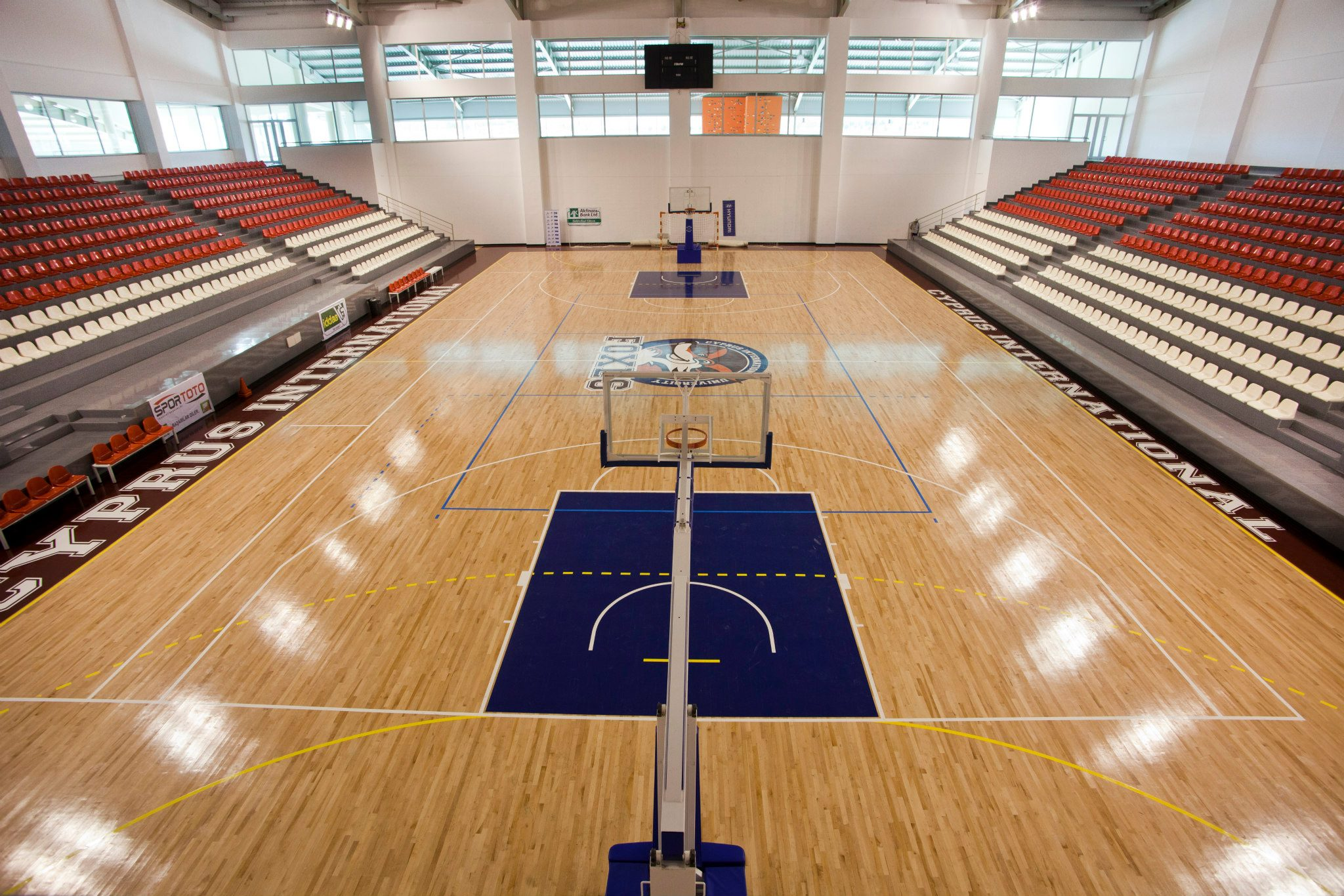
CIU Arena, the sports complex of the Cyprus International University that is the largest in Northern Cyprus

North Nicosia hosts five out of the fourteen teams of the Turkish Cypriot Süper Lig, the top football division in Northern Cyprus: Çetinkaya, Yenicami, Küçük Kaymaklı, Gönyeli and Gençlik Gücü. Çetinkaya is the most successful Turkish Cypriot team with 14 titles, and teams from Nicosia have won the majority of the trophies in the league. Çetinkaya is also the oldest member of the league, founded in 1930, and holds the distinction of having won the united Cypriot league prior to the division. There is also a large following of Turkish football teams in the city, with celebrations in the Dereboyu area for their victories.

The city annually hosts the Nicosia Marathon, to which over a thousand people participated in 2014, including leading political figures. The marathon passes through the city's popular avenues and landmarks with the categories of 4, 8 and 21 kilometres, the 4 km being regarded as a public walk. Among the other sports events in the city is the Lefkoşa Open tennis tournament. Lefkoşa Beach Volley Arena located in the city hosts the annual Zafer Beach Volleyball Cup that are part of the Turkish national cup. In 2015, the city hosted the first Nicosia Youth and Sports Festival, encompassing a number of sports activities from 22 sports, including a street basketball event, tennis, handball, shooting, boxing and table tennis tournaments.

North Nicosia is home to several sports venues. The center of sports in the city is considered to be the Atatürk Sports Complex, home of the Nicosia Atatürk Stadium, which is the biggest stadium in the island with a capacity of 28,000 people. The stadium is the home of Çetinkaya and Yenicami. The sports complex also hosts the Atatürk Sports Hall, which functions as an arena for basketball, volleyball and handball, the Atatürk Indoor Swimming Pool, where popular swimming competitions are held with Turkish teams also participating, tennis courts and headquarters of the Turkish Cypriots sports federations of several branches. The complex also hosts an athlete training facility, and is accessible to disabled athletes. The Nicosia Turkish Municipality is active in terms of building new sports facilities and has done so in the Metehan area, with projects underway in the Hamitköy and Haspolat regions.

North Nicosia has hosted international sports organisations. It hosted the 9th Global Taekwondo Federation World Taekwondo Championship in 2013 and the Economic Cooperation Organization University Games in 2013. Its prospects of hosting and participating in many international tournaments are hindered by an international sports embargo. It was also part of the annual Cyprus Rally in 2014, which garnered huge popular attention and attracted crowds.

The universities contribute significantly to the sports life of North Nicosia. The Near East University has the only Olympic pool in the island with an area of 2700 square meters, and over 12000 people have attended swimming courses in the pool. It also has a modern sports hall and a health and wellness campus covering more than 2000 square meters. Its synchronised swimming team carries out regular performances and is active in several branches. The CIU Arena of the Cyprus International University has a total area of 22,500 square metres and is the biggest integrated sports complex in Northern Cyprus. It hosts an indoor sports hall, an indoor swimming pool, tennis courts and other facilities from a beach handball arena to a climbing wall. It also has the CIU Foxes teams, whose men's handball branch won the national league two times in a row.

== International relations ==
North Nicosia is twinned with:

| Ankara, Turkey; Bursa, Turkey since 1990; Comrat, Moldova since 2006 | Gaziantep, Turkey since 2009; Karbinci, North Macedonia since 2001; Aračinovo, North Macedonia since 2002 |

== Gallery ==
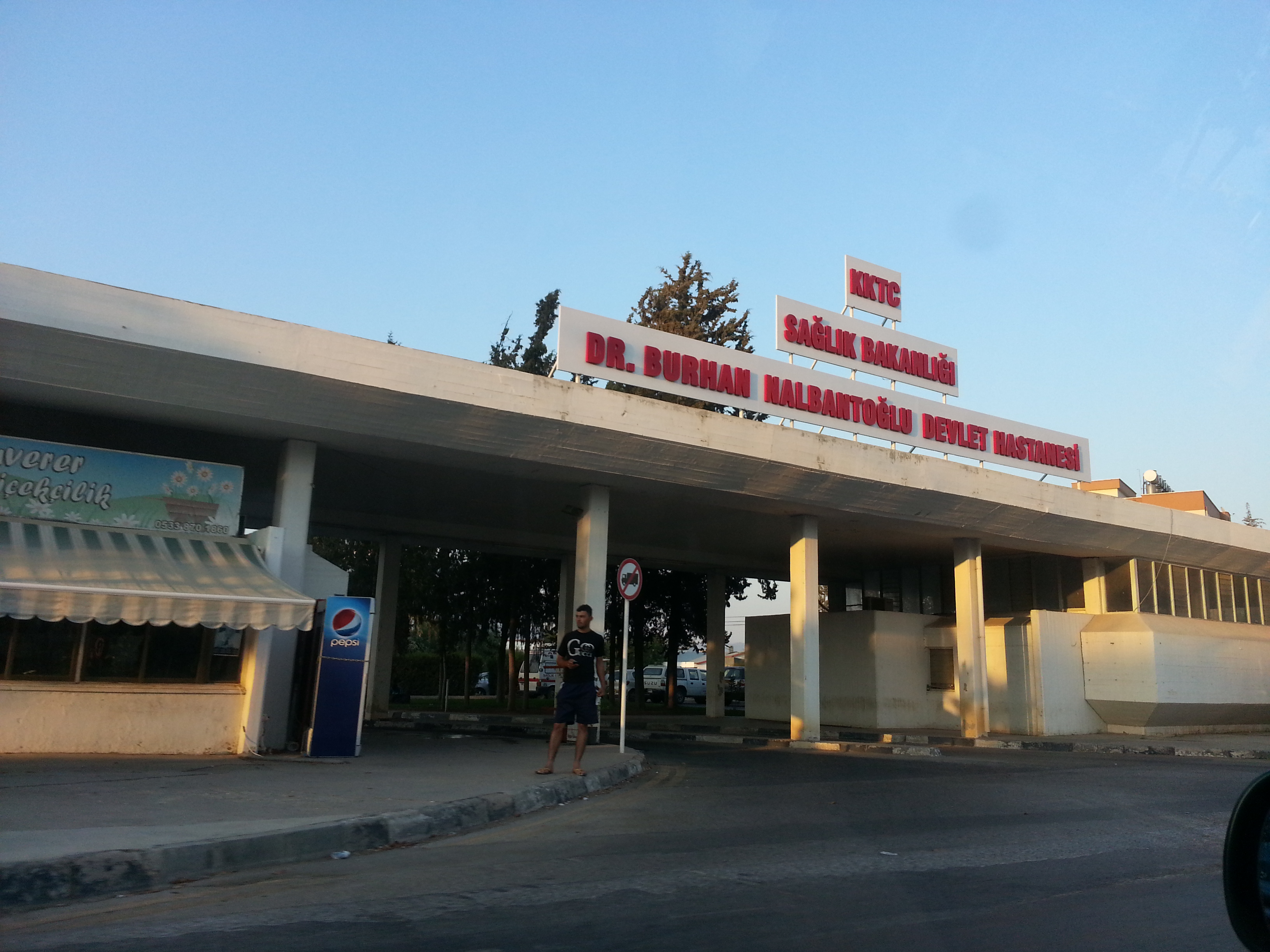
Dr. Burhan Nalbantoğlu State Hospital

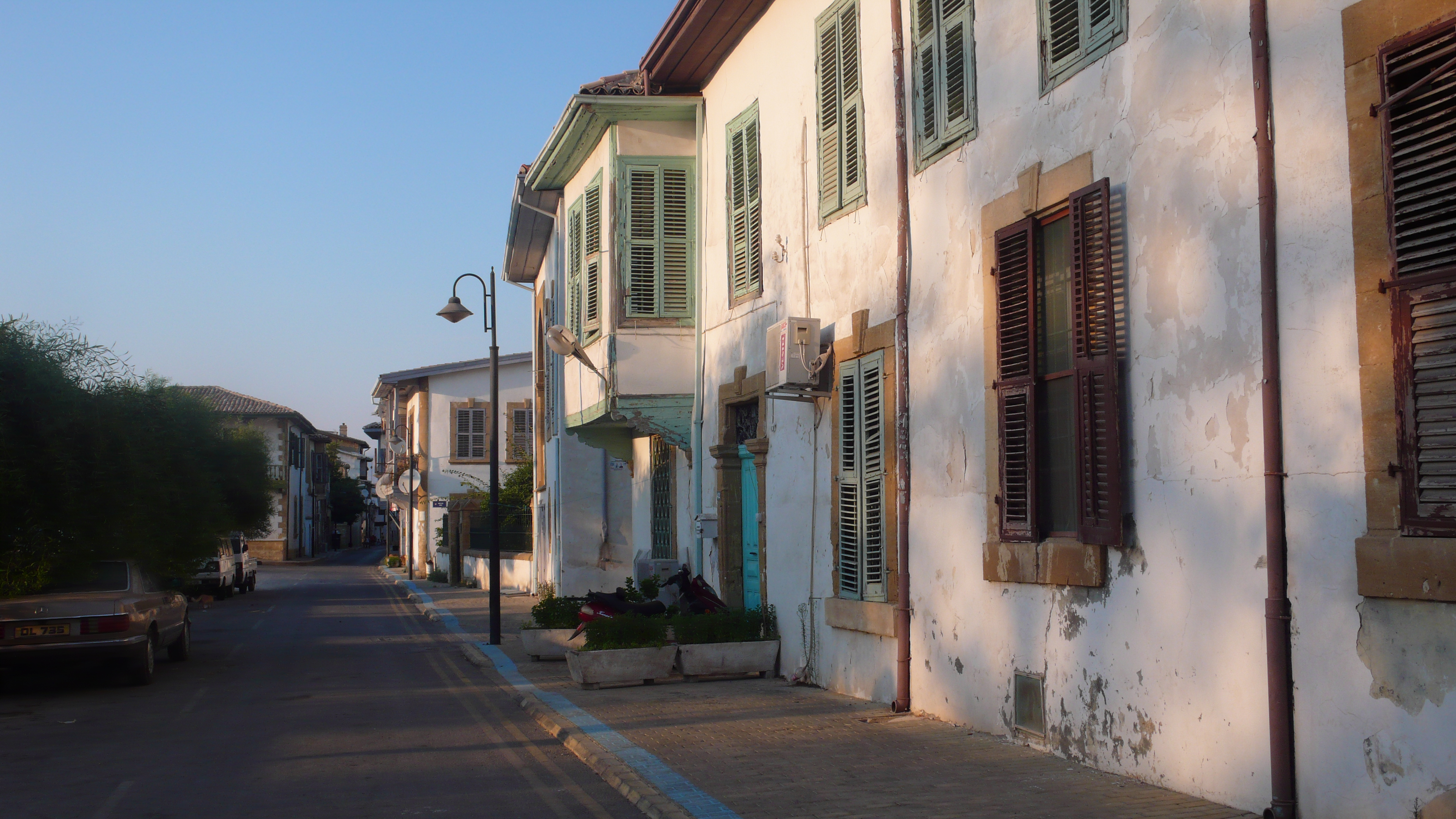
A backstreet in the walled city

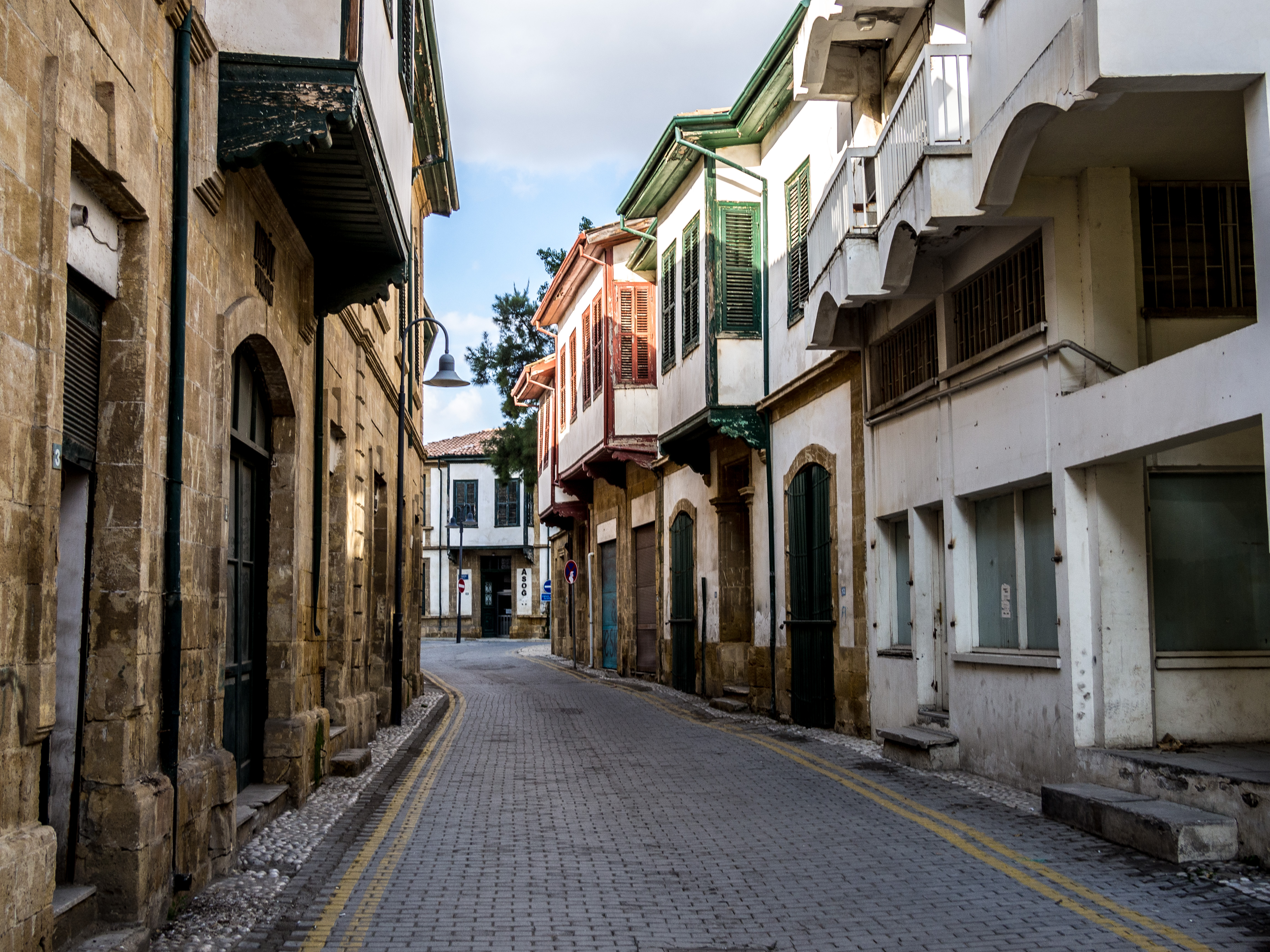
A backstreet in the walled city

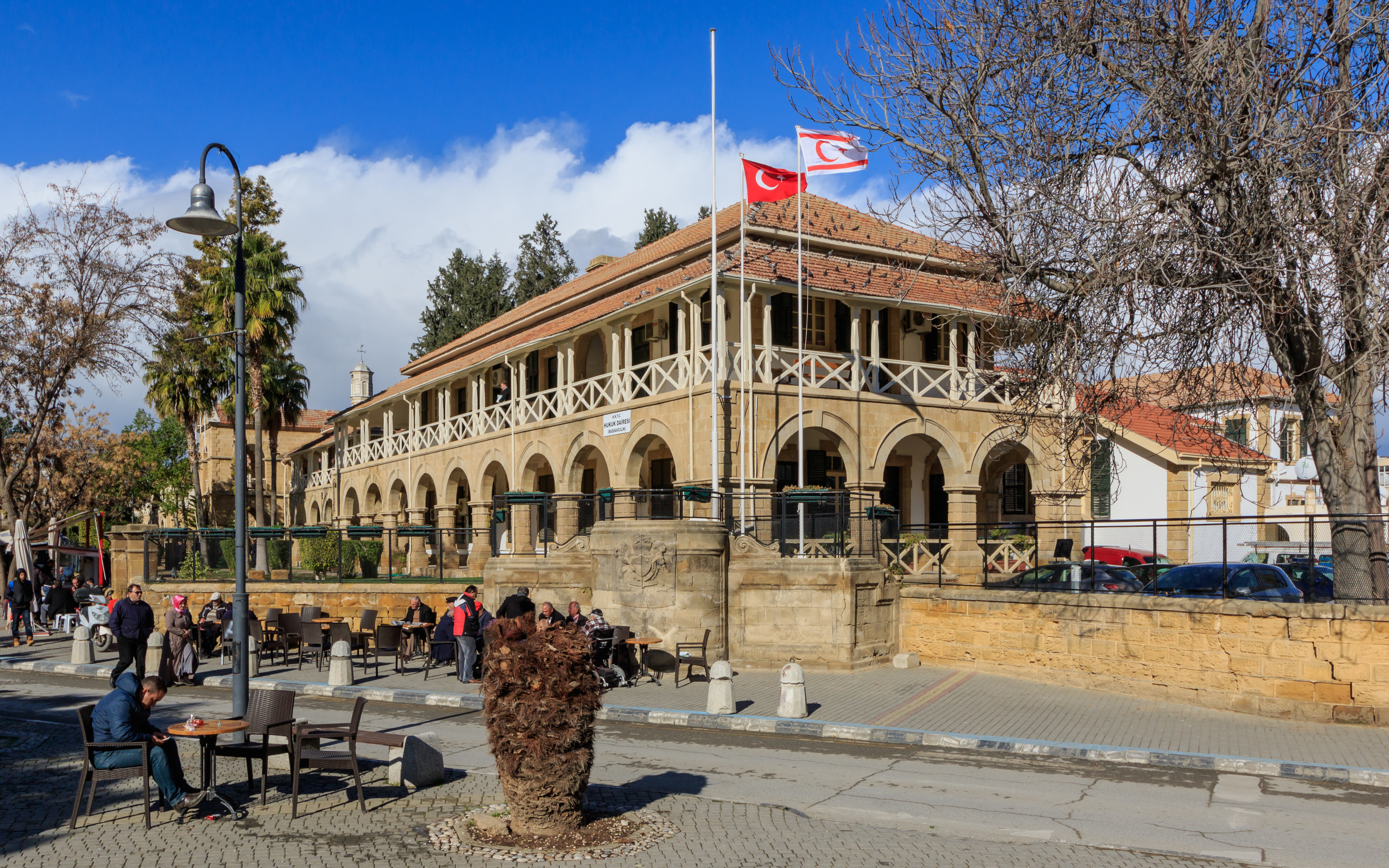
Court of law in North Nicosia

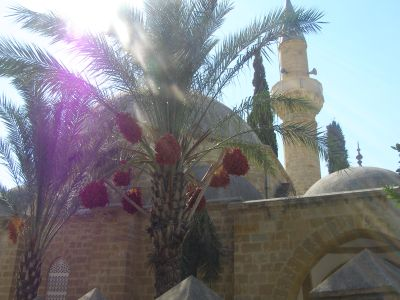
Arabahmet Mosque

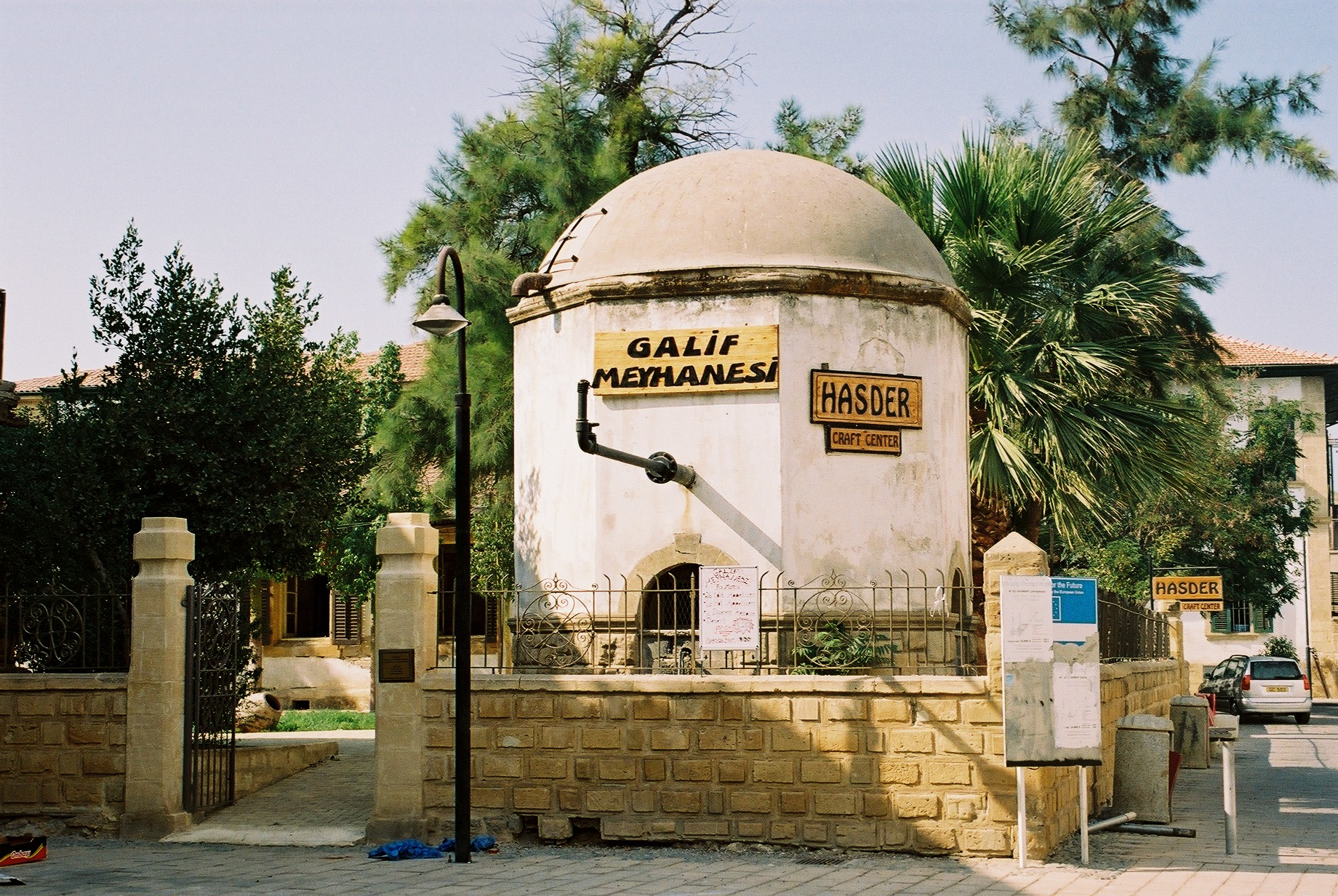
A cultural center-tavern in the walled city

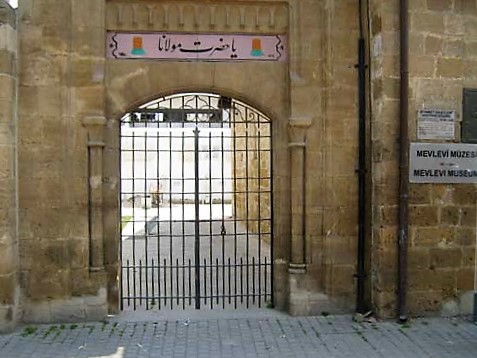
Mevlevi Museum

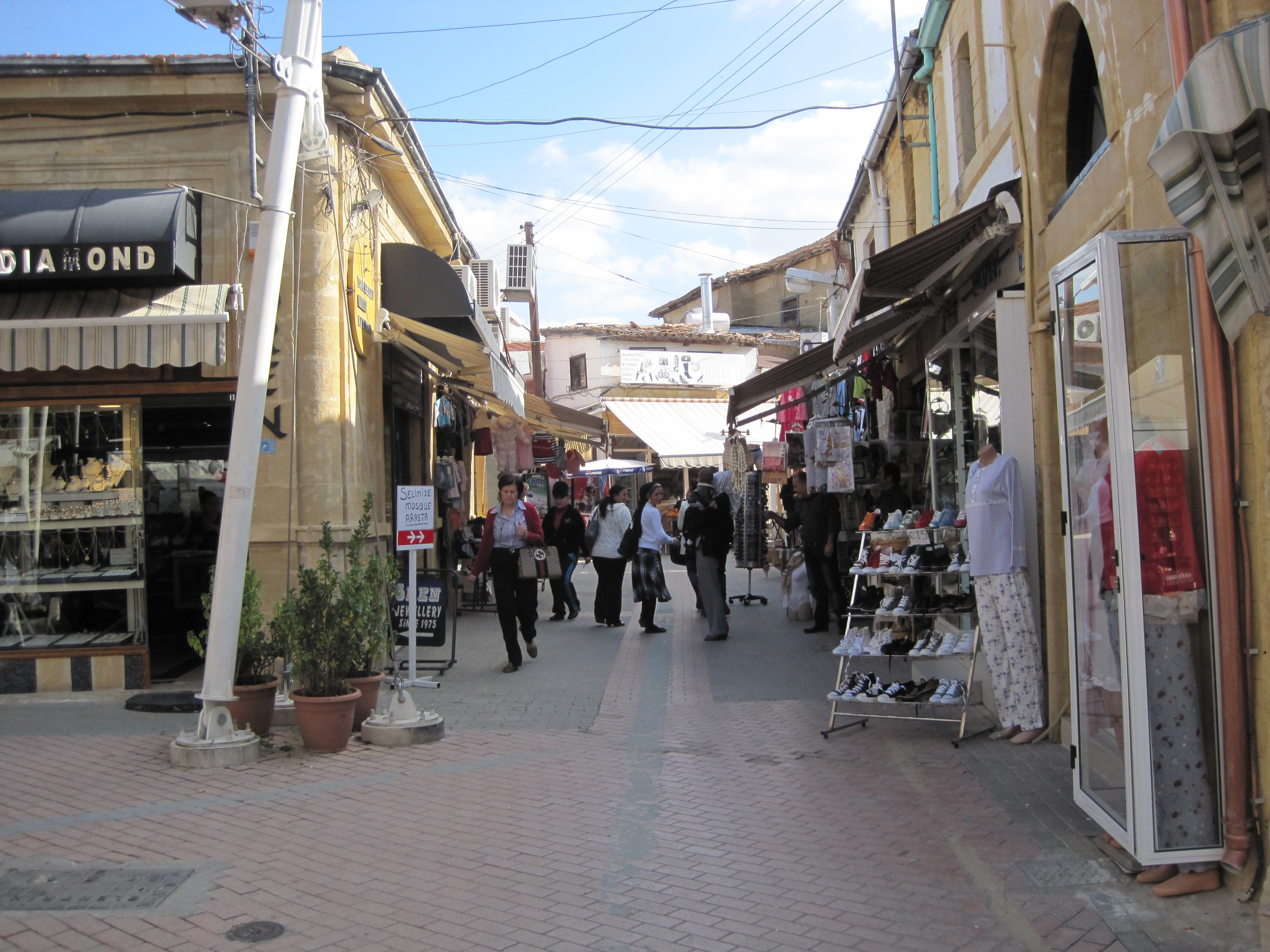
The Arasta region

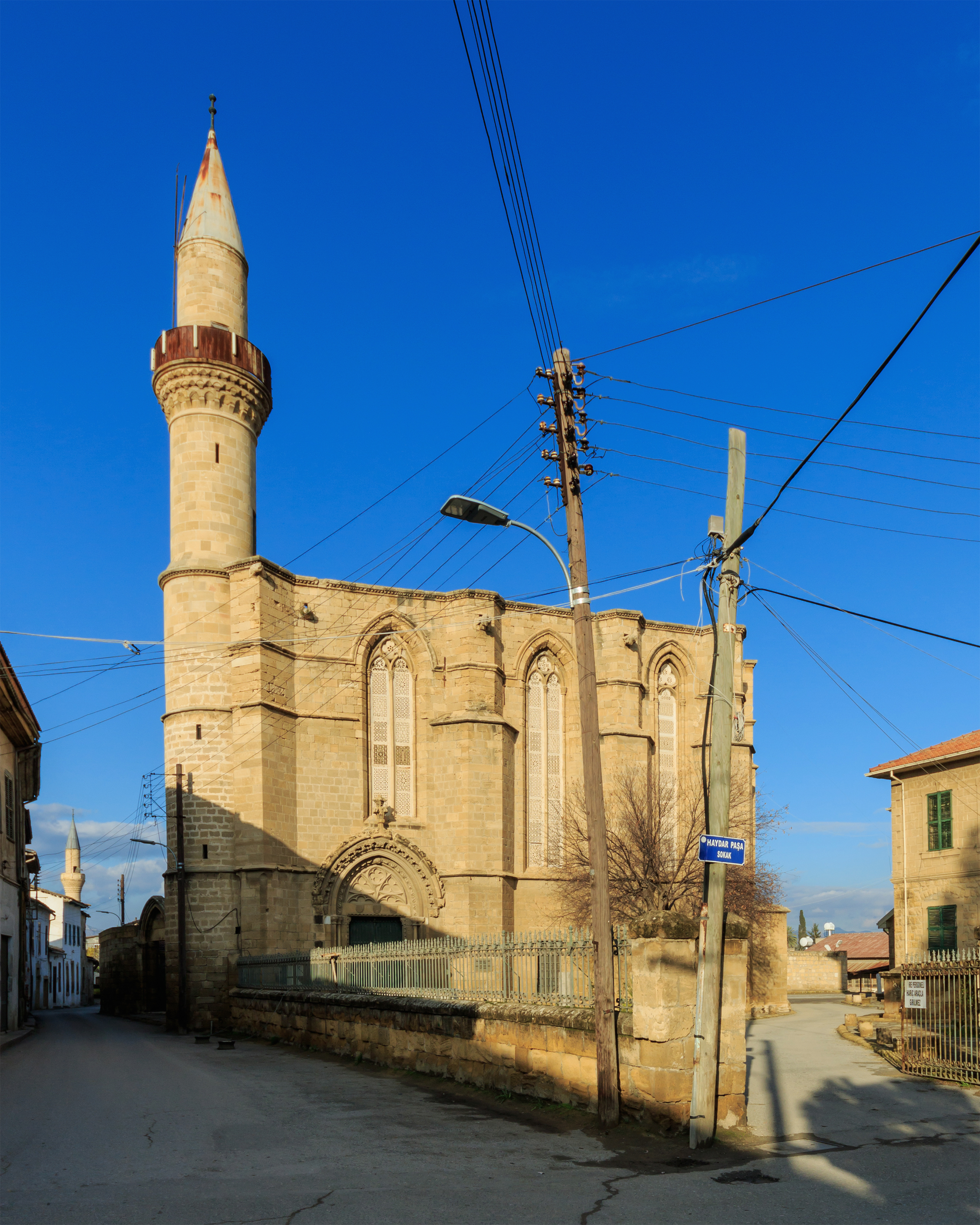
Haydar Pasha Mosque

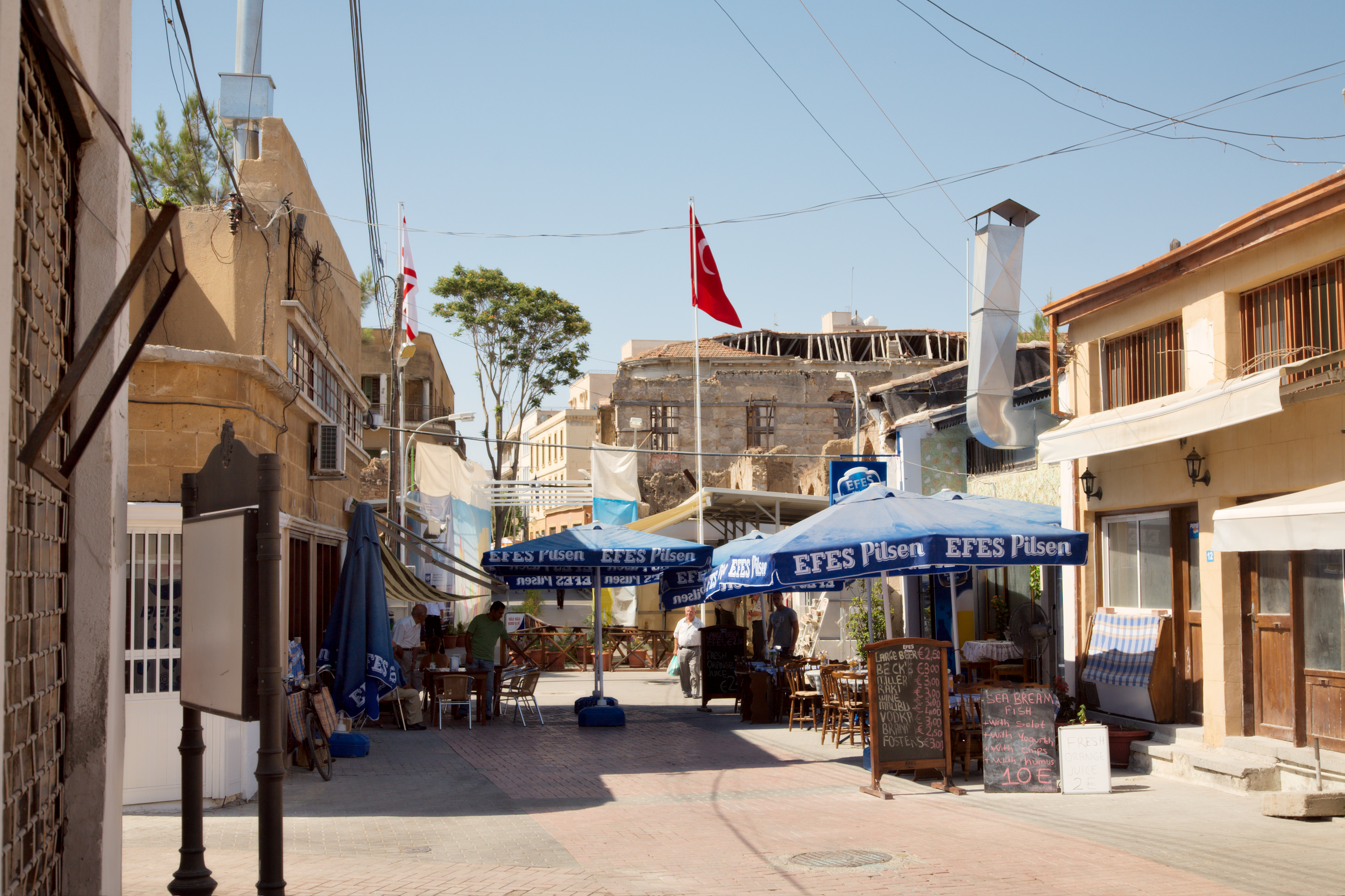
Ledra Street

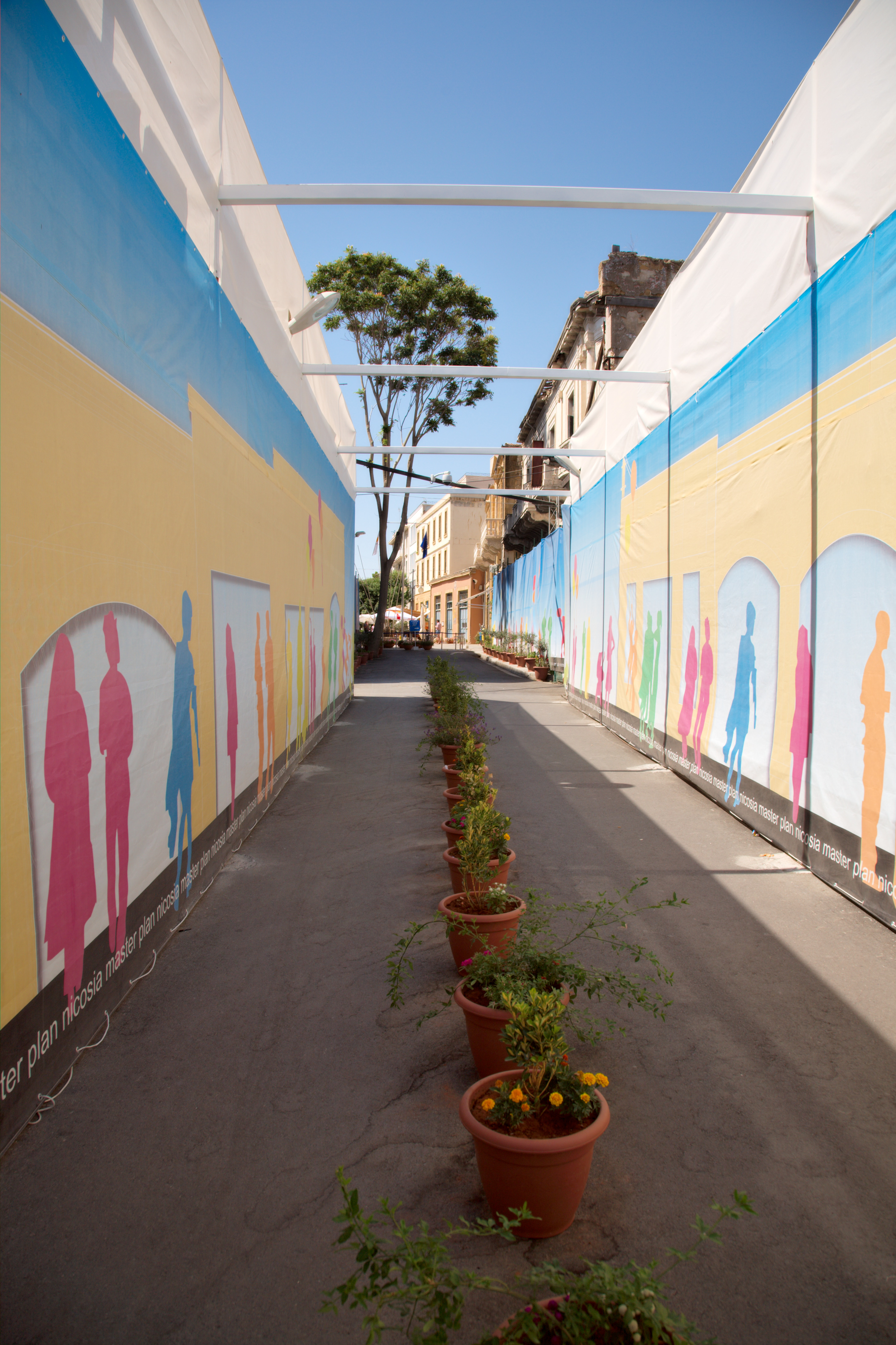
Ledra Street

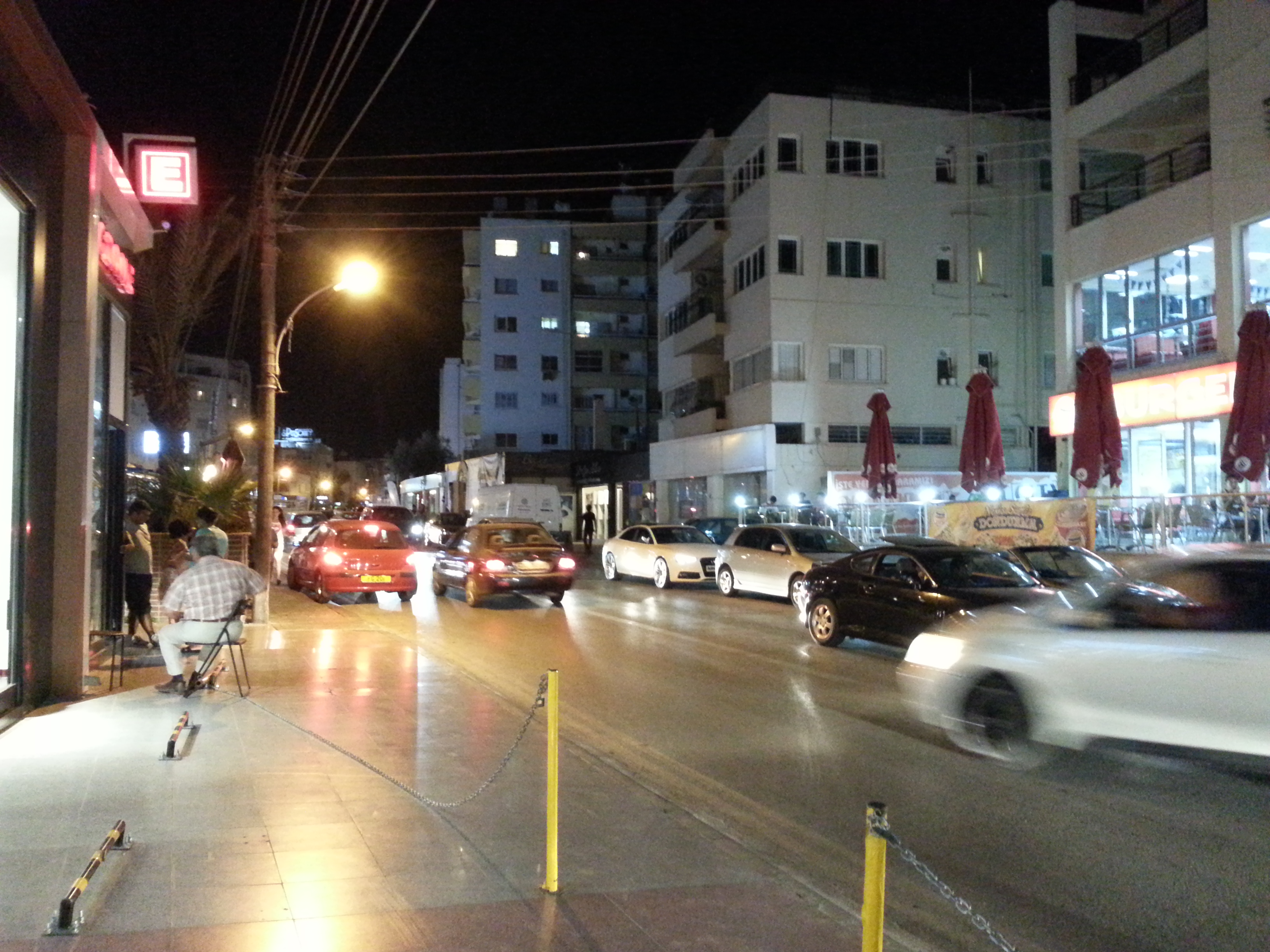
Dereboyu at night

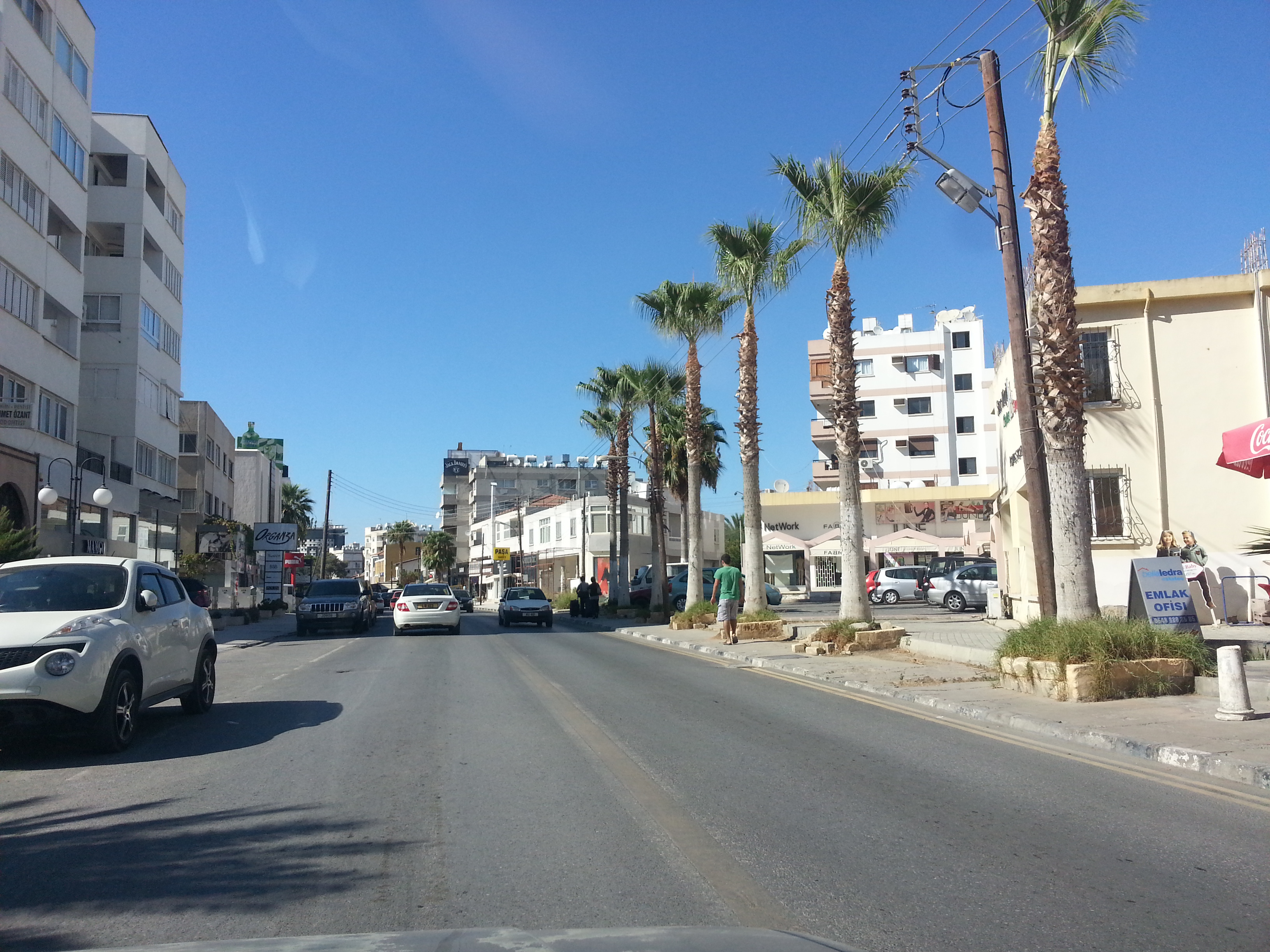
Dereboyu during daytime

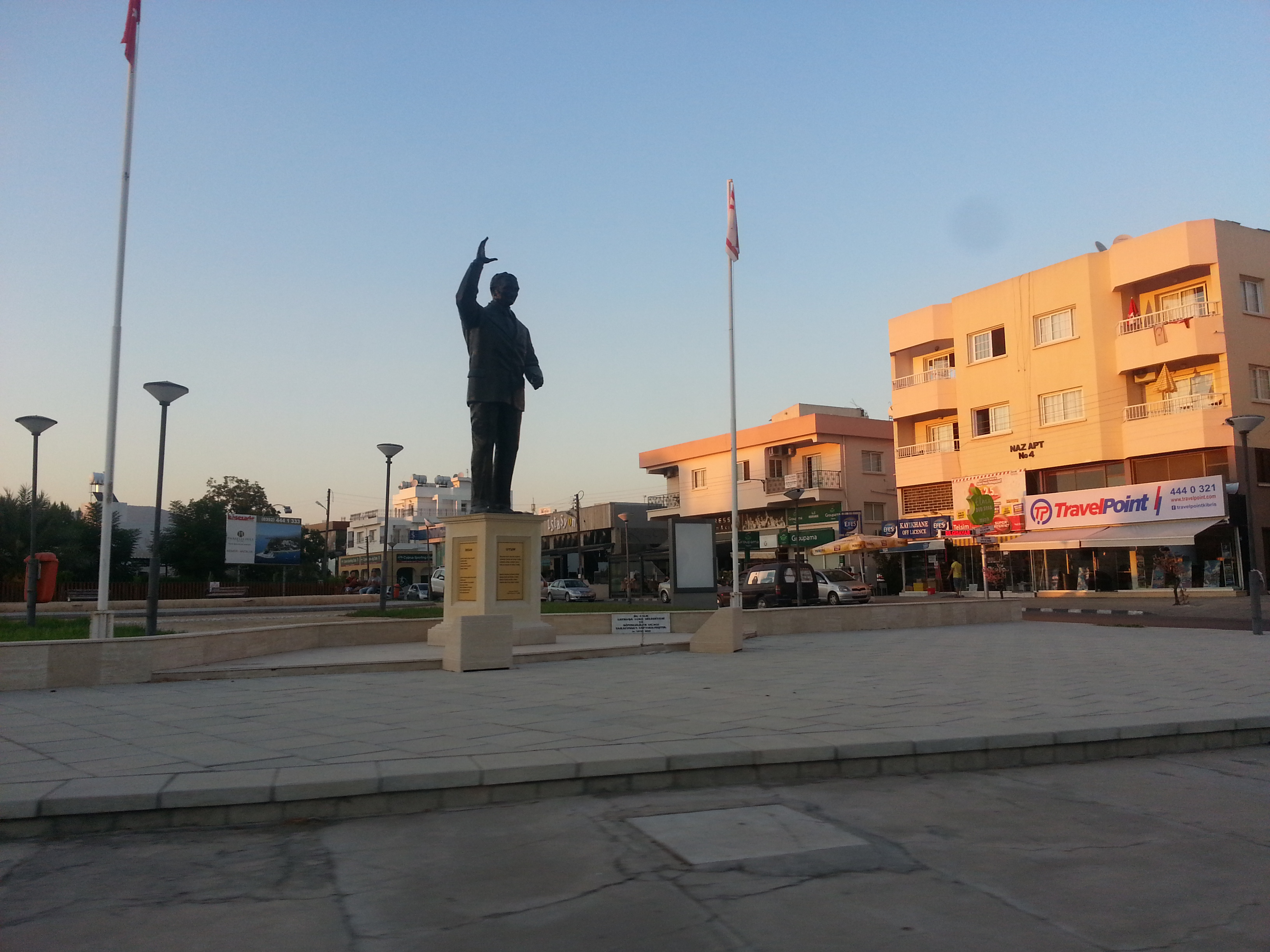
Bülent Ecevit Square in Taşkınköy/Göçmenköy

== See also ==
- List of divided cities
- United Nations Peacekeeping Force in Cyprus
