= List of mosques in Cyprus =

This is a list of mosques in Cyprus.

== List of mosques ==
Name	Images	City	Year (CE)	Group	Remarks
Selimiye Mosque		Nicosia (North)	1570	Su	Originally known as the 'Saint Sophia Cathedral', the French Lusignan dynasty constructed it between 1209 and 1228.
Haydar Pasha Mosque		Nicosia (North)	1570	Su	Built during the 14th century as St. Catherine's church, it was converted in to a mosque in 1570, during the Ottoman era.
Bayraktar Mosque		Nicosia (South)	1571	Su	The first mosque built by the Ottomans after the conquest of Nicosia
Arab Ahmet Mosque		Nicosia (North)	1571	Su	
New Mosque (Yeni Cami)		Nicosia (North)	1571		Originally a 14th-century church, it was converted into a mosque in 1571.
Lala Mustafa Pasha Mosque		Famagusta	1571		Originally known as the 'Saint Nicolas Cathedral', the French Lusignan dynasty constructed it between 1298 and 1312; converted to a mosque in 1571.
Ömeriye Mosque		Nicosia (South)	1571-1572		First site of prayer by Turks on island of Cyprus following its conquest in 1571.
Agha Cafer Pasha Mosque		Kyrenia	1580s		
Akkule Mosque		Famagusta	1618		
Kazaphana Mosque		Kyrenia	17th century		
Iplik Pazari Mosque		Nicosia (North)	18th century		
Dükkanlar Önü Mosque		Nicosia (North)	c. 18th century	Su	Converted in to a mosque during the Ottoman era
Hala Sultan Tekke		Larnaca	1816-1817	Su	Fourth holiest site in Islam; affiliated with Sufism
Sarayönü Mosque		Nicosia (North)	1820		
Cami-i Kebir, The Great Mosque		Limassol	1825		Built by Mestan Agha, beside an ancient graveyard containing the graves of two Turkish notables, Mehmet Efendi, who died in 1758, and the Admiral of the Fleet, Souleyman Pasha, who died in 1715. Currently closed by the Cypriot government for renovation and reopening in June 2020; although no changes have been made other than the total removal of all Islamic artefacts and books.
Turunçlu Mosque		Nicosia (North)	1825	Su	
Taht-el-kale Mosque		Nicosia (South)	1826		
Laleli Mosque		Nicosia (North)	1827	Su	
Ziya Pasha Mosque		Dali	1837		
Akkavuk Mosque		Nicosia (North)	1904	Su	Built on the site of a smaller mosque from 1895.
Araplar Mosque		Nicosia (South)			
Hamit Bey Sokagi		Larnaca			Located in a disrepaired / abandoned state at the corner of Athansiou Karydi and Andrea Strouthidi Street, as shown on some maps.
Kebir Mosque		Limassol			"The Grand Mosque"
Nöbethane Masjid		Nicosia			
Osman Fazil Polat Pasha Mosque		Famagusta			
Peristerona Mosque		Peristerona			Featured on the five-pound Cypriot banknote
Piri Osman Pasha Mosque		Lefka			
Tabakhane Masjid		Nicosia			
Tophane Masjid		Nicosia			A former mosque

== Legend ==
Group / Tradition	Abbreviation
Ahmadiyya	A
Non-denominational	ND
Shia Islam	SH
Sunni Islam	Su

== See also ==
- Islam in Cyprus
- List of mosques in Europe
