= New Mosque, Nicosia =

Mosque in Nicosia, Northern Cyprus

New Mosque
- Yeni Cami
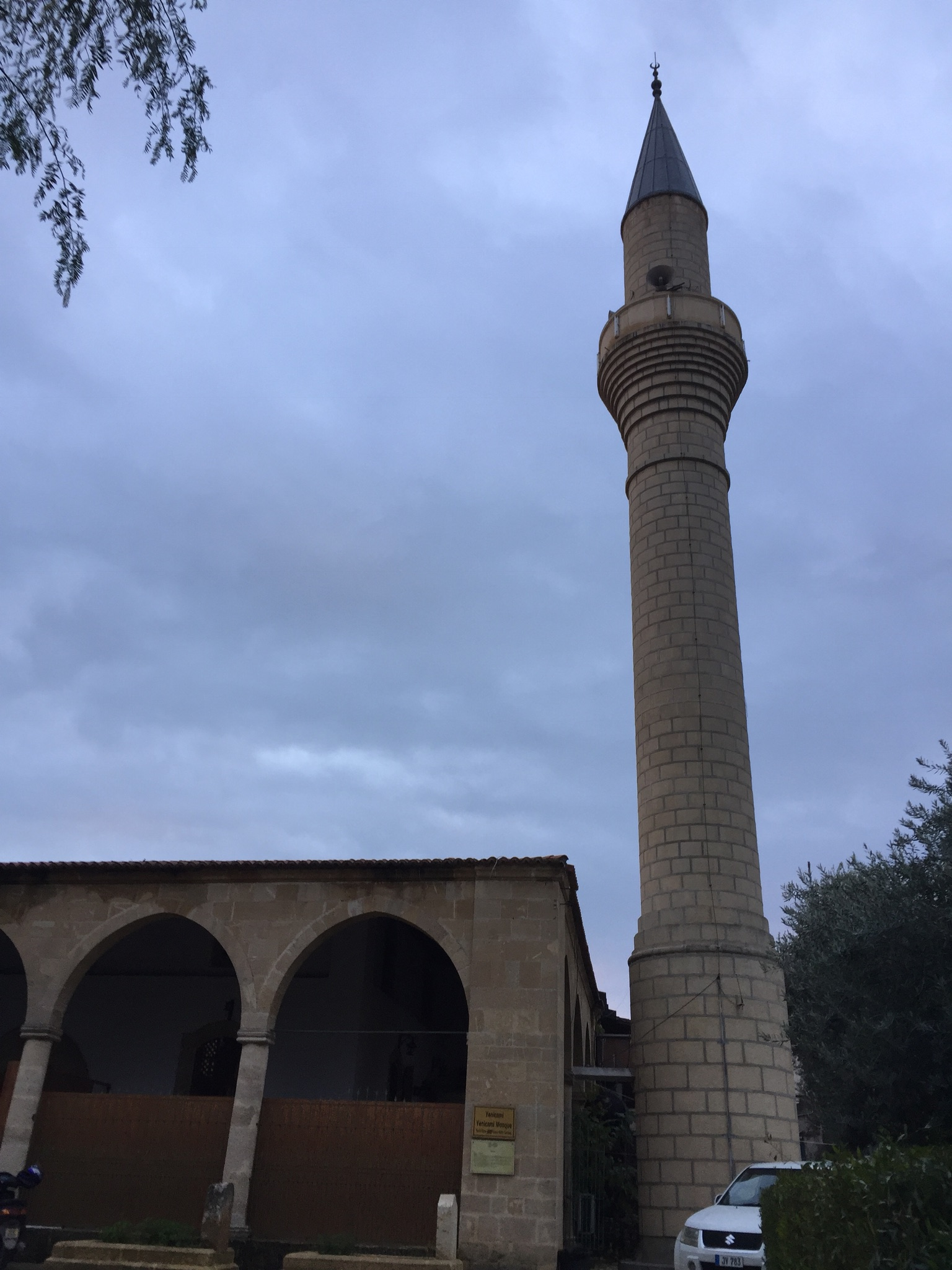

Religion
- Affiliation: Islam

Location
- Municipality: Nicosia
- Country: Cyprus
- Interactive map of New Mosque

Architecture
- Type: mosque

The New Mosque (Turkish: Yeni Cami) is a mosque in the northern part of Nicosia. The quarter of Yeni Jami, in which it is situated, is named after the mosque.

== History ==
The first building at the site of the current mosque was built as a church in the Gothic style in the 14th century and converted to a mosque in 1571, after the Ottoman conquest of Cyprus. Camille Enlart and George Jeffery, who undertook the first architectural examination of the remains of this building, wrote that this building could potentially be older than St. Catherine's Church, today known as the Haydar Pasha Mosque. However, following a re-examination of the architectural features, Michalis Olympios concluded that the architecture in the New Mosque must have been influenced by St Catherine's Church, not the other way around. As such, he argued that the New Mosque must have been built in the second half of the 14th century, after the construction of St Catherine's Church, which took place in the late 1350s or the early 1360s.

== See also ==
- Islam in Cyprus
