= Sarayönü Mosque =

Mosque in North Nicosia, Northern Cyprus

- Sarayönü Camii
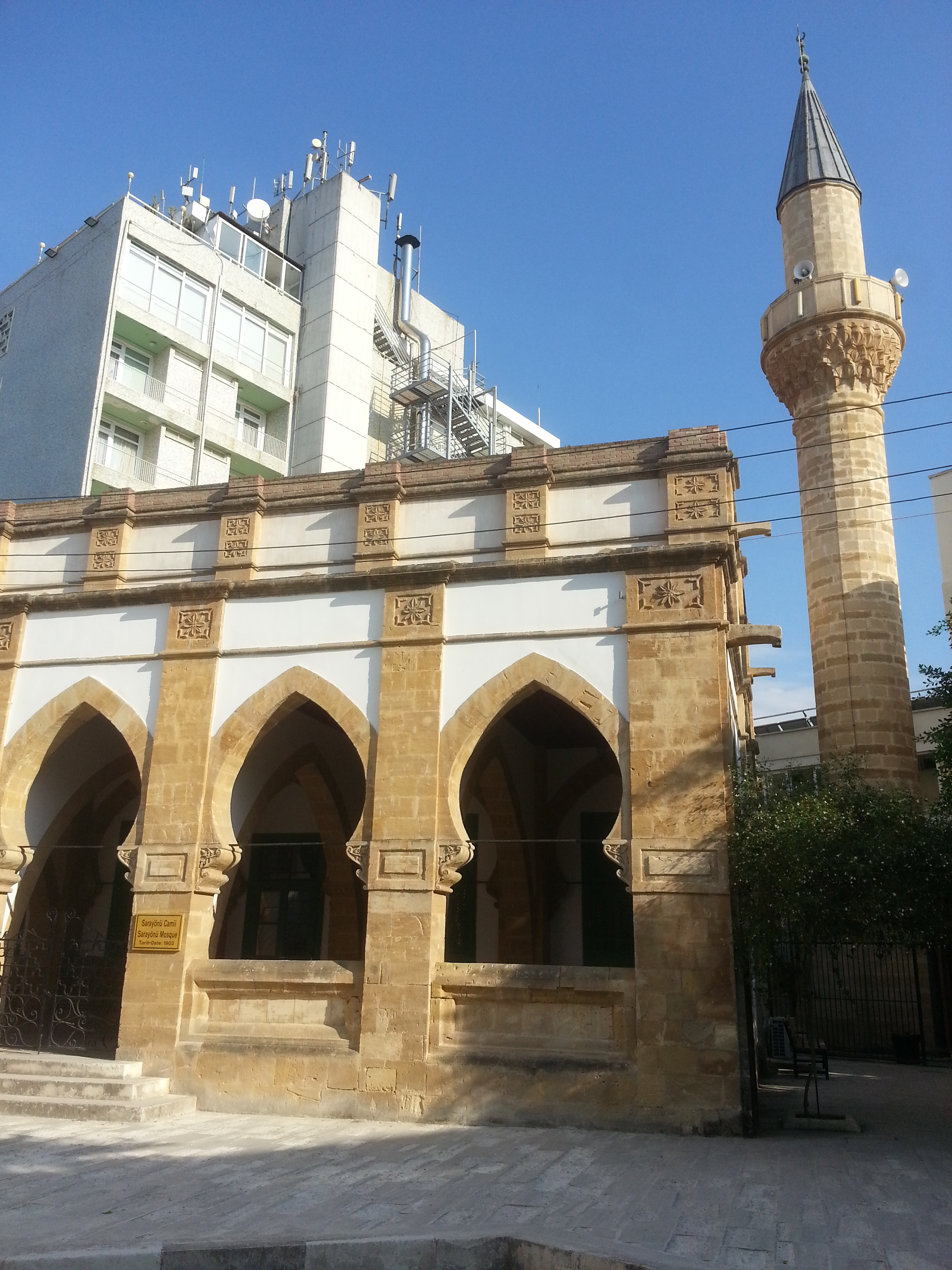

Location
- Location: North Nicosia, Cyprus
- Interactive map of Sarayönü Mosque
- Coordinates: 35.1776°N 33.3607°E

Architecture
- Type: Mosque
- Style: Moorish

Sarayönü Mosque (Turkish: Sarayönü Camii), also known as the Mosque of the Serai, is a mosque in the walled city of Nicosia, Cyprus, currently located in North Nicosia. It is very close to the Sarayönü Square and has historically been on the square.

== History ==
Camille Enlart has held that the 14th and 15th centuries, during the Lusignan and Venetian rules, the site of the mosque was home to a Carmelite church. It had one dome and was reportedly surrounded by a graveyard, which was the site of burial of a King of Jerusalem, a Duke of Normandy and other nobles. After the Ottoman conquest of Cyprus in 1571, an army encampment was placed at the Sarayönü Square and the Carmelite church was converted to a mosque to facilitate the worship of the soldiers. The exterior of the converted building exhibited Gothic architecture while the interior classical exhibited Ottoman architecture. It was named "Orduönü Mescidi" in Turkish, meaning "the masjid of the front of the army encampment".

Later during the Ottoman rule, a new mosque was built instead of the former Carmelite church. The construction date of this mosque varies: some sources put its construction at 1690–91, attributed to "Kıncı (Kılıç) Ali Pasha", while some place it at 1820–24, attributed to an "Ali Pasha". This mosque had traditional Ottoman architecture in the interior; it had a roof that was supported by two sharp arches and an undecorated minaret. In 1873, A.L. Salvator, who visited the mosque, wrote that a sarcophagus with Greek inscriptions was located in the yard of the mosque, and was used for ablutions before prayer. The sarcophagus would be moved to the yard of the Haydar Pasha Mosque in 1980.

In 1748, Ebubekir Pasha, the Ottoman Governor of Cyprus, founded the Sarayönü Medrese on the grounds of the mosque complex.

The mosque was destroyed in an earthquake in January 1900. Fenton Atkinson, a British architect, drew the plans for the current mosque in the same year. Atkinson was allegedly inspired by his recollection of Andalusia. The construction of the current mosque began on 26 November 1901 and probably ended in 1903.

After the intercommunal conflict known as the Bloody Christmas in 1963–64, Turkish Cypriots did not have a building available to conduct official marriage ceremonies. The mosque was thus converted into a marriage office. The carpets on the floor were allegedly removed and benches were allegedly placed in the mosque. In 2004, after pressure from conservative and moderate Islamist circles in Turkey, including the national newspaper Zaman, it was converted back into a mosque.

== Architecture ==
The mosque was designed in the Moorish architectural style, but also incorporates some Indian influence. Its layout, however, is rectangular and thus conforms to the traditional Cypriot style. Its front façade, showing foreign influences, is composed of five parts, with sharp horseshoe-shaped arches. The minaret, which is from the earlier Ottoman mosque, is made of stone and stands detached from the main body of the mosque.
