= Islam in Cyprus =

Islam is the second-largest religion in Cyprus, after Christianity, and is also the predominant faith of the Turkish Cypriot community which resides in Northern Cyprus. Before the Turkish invasion of Cyprus in 1974, the Turkish Cypriot community made up 18% of the island's population and lived throughout the island. Today, most of the estimated 264,172 Muslims are based in the north of the island.

Turkish Cypriot society is formally relatively secular; adherents to the faith subscribe mostly to the Sunni branch of Islam, with an influential stream of Sufism underlying their spiritual heritage and development. Nazim al-Qubrusi, the leader of the Naqshbandi-Haqqani Sufi order, hailed from Larnaca and lived in Lefka. Another branch among the Turkish Cypriot Muslims is Alevism. There are also a few Turkish Cypriots who are Ahmadi Muslims.

== History ==
It is rumored that an aunt of Muhammad, Umm Haram, had accompanied one of the early Arab expeditions to the island. She died during the expedition and was buried at the present Hala Sultan Tekke monument.

In the medieval period, Arabs controlled the island, before the Byzantine reconquest.

Since the Turkish invasion of Cyprus in 1974, the Muslim population in the north of the island has been bolstered by settlers from Turkey who are almost exclusively Sunni Muslims. The status of these settlers is disputed under international law and specifically the prohibition, under the Geneva Convention, on the cross-border transfer of populations by states aiming to engineer changes in the demographic make-up of other states.

The segregation of Cypriot Turks and Greeks has effected that most of the Muslims in the territory controlled by the Republic of Cyprus are Arab immigrants and refugees, unrelated to the Turks historically living in the area.

== Important landmarks ==
Several important Islamic shrines and landmarks exist on the island including:

- the Arab Ahmet Mosque in Nicosia (built in the 16th century)
- the Hala Sultan Tekke/Umm Haram Mosque in Larnaca (built in the 18th century)
- the Lala Mustafa Pasha Mosque, Selimiye Mosque and the Haydarpasha Mosque; former Catholic cathedrals left from the Crusader era, which were meant to cater exclusively to the Catholic minority which ruled the island and were converted to mosques after the Muslim conquest in the Middle Ages.

== Gallery ==
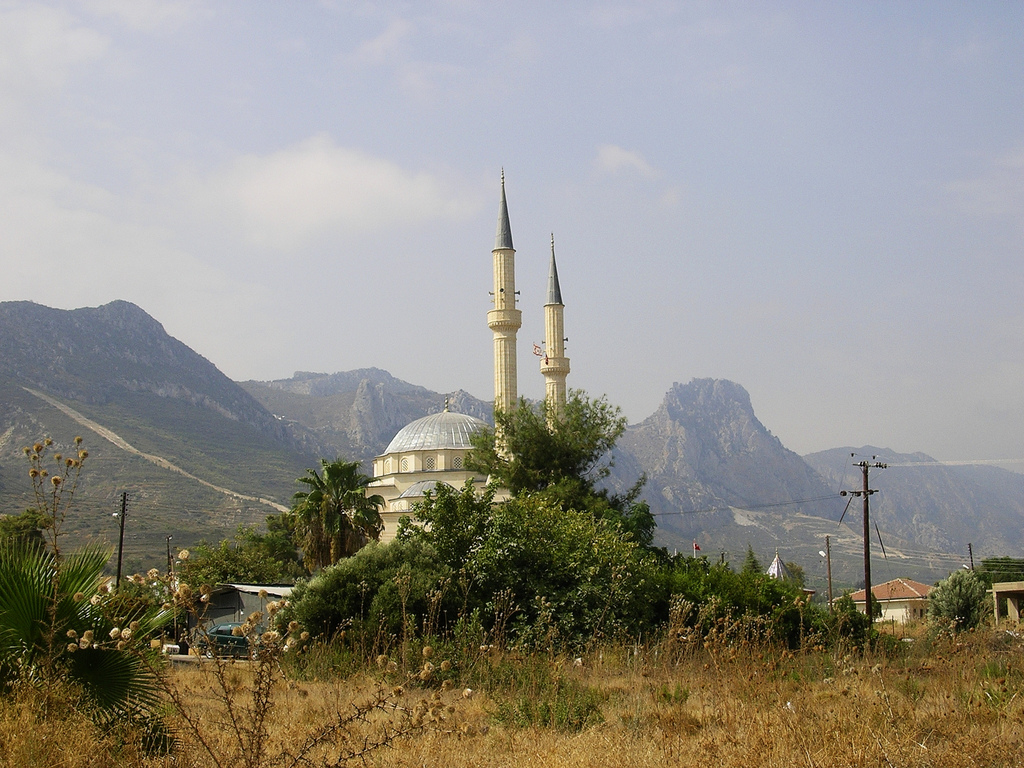
A mosque in Kyrenia

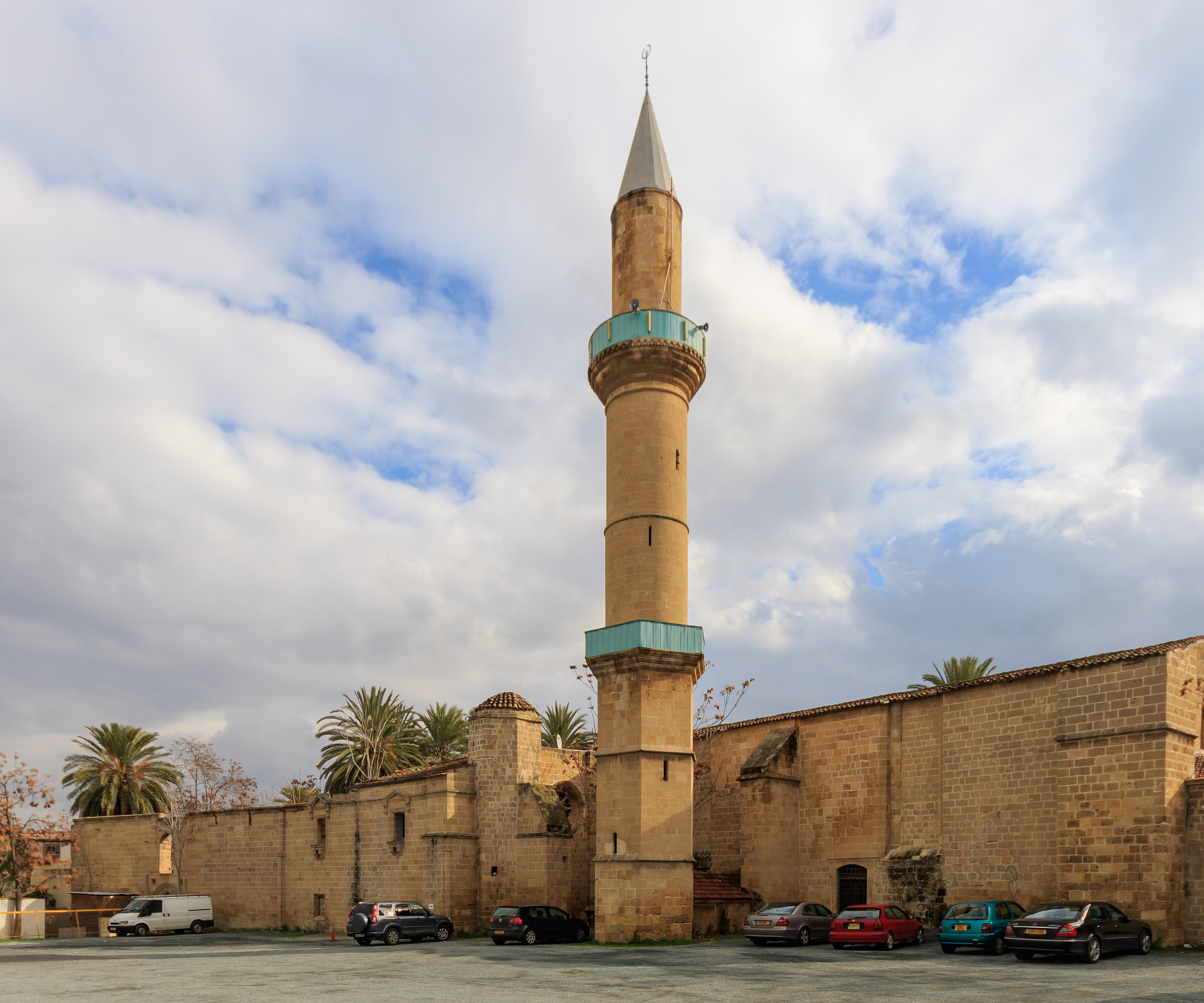
Ömeriye Mosque in Nicosia

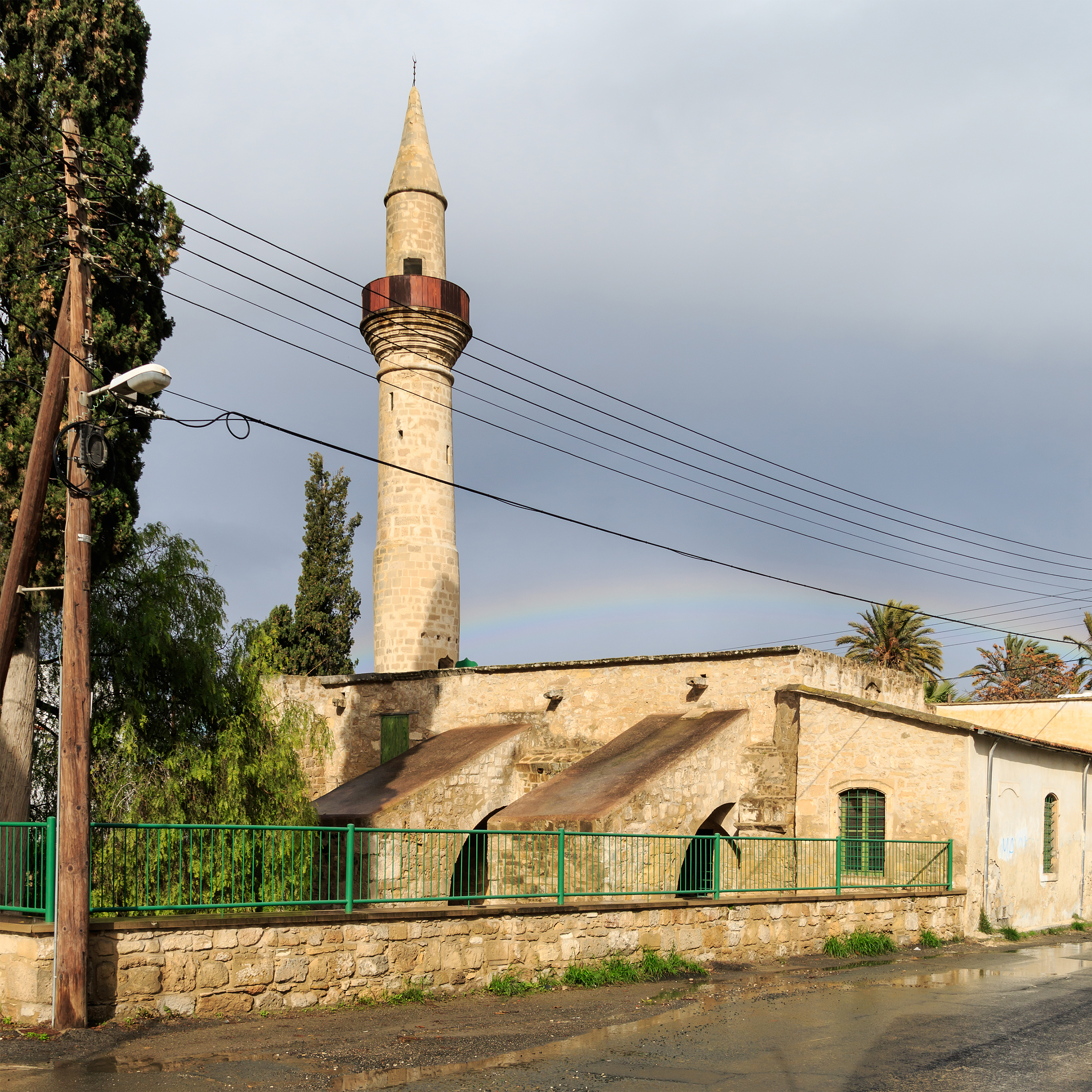
Tuzla Mosque in Larnaca

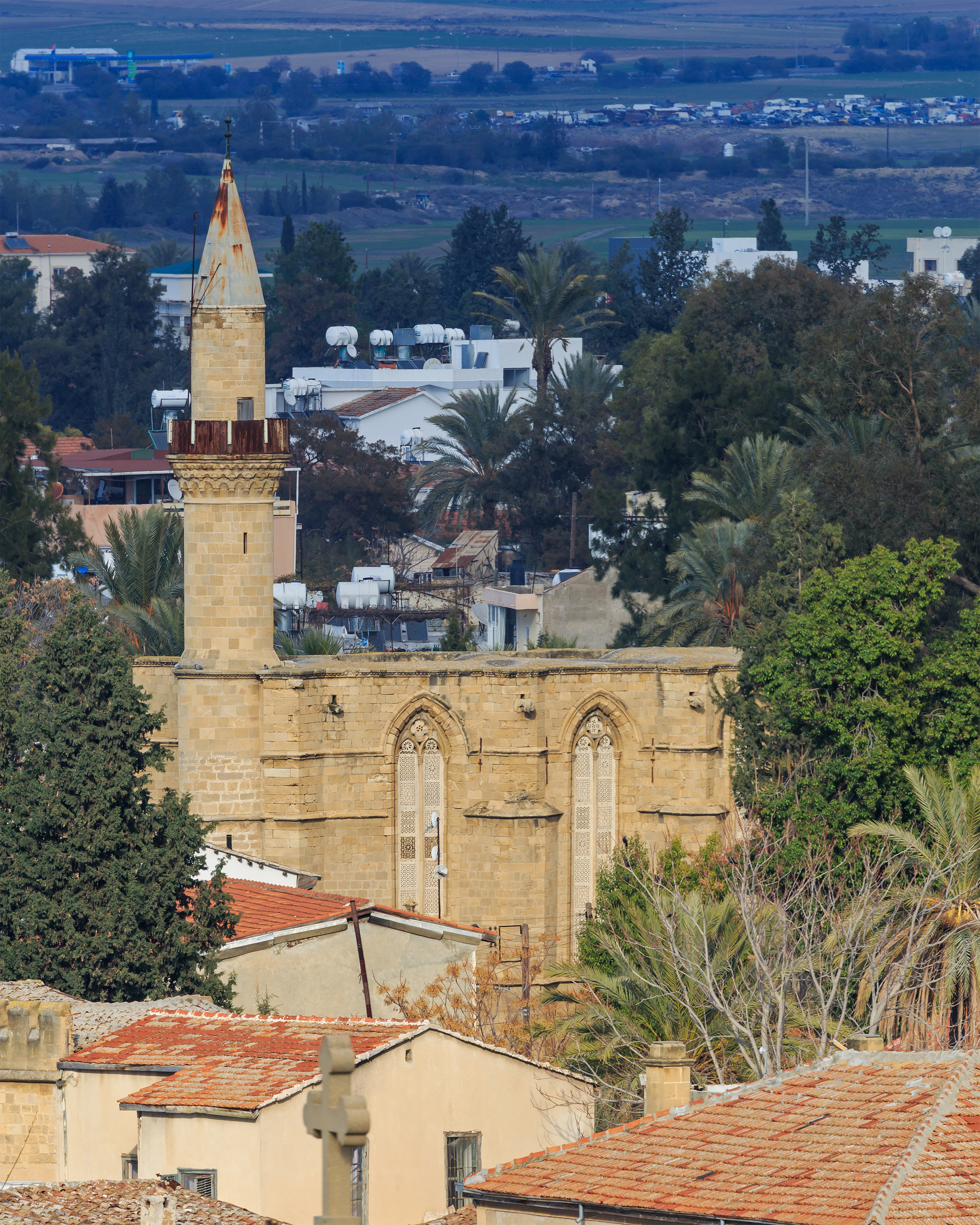
Haydar Pasha Mosque in Nicosia

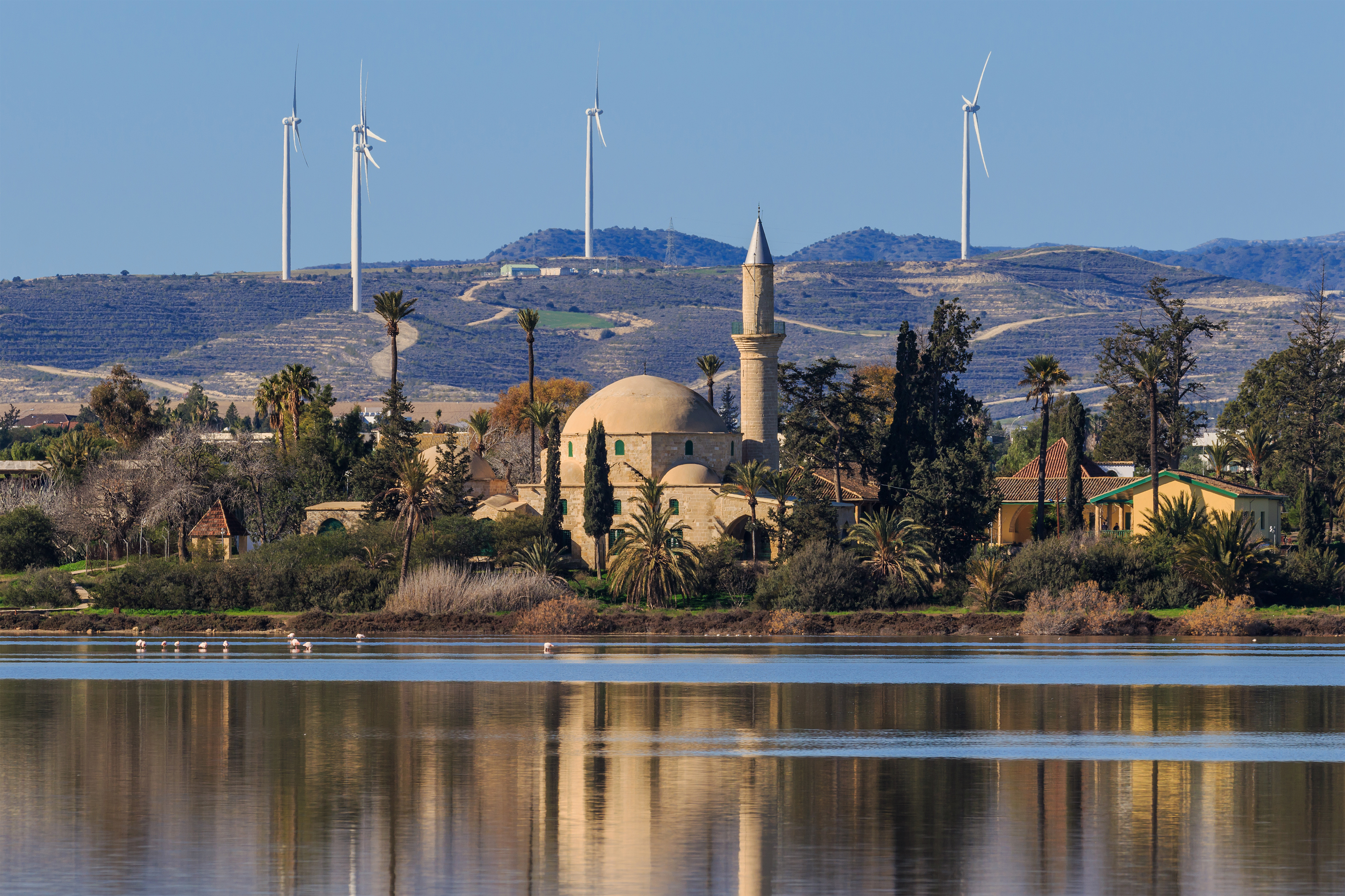
Hala Sultan Tekke with Larnaca Salt Lake in the foreground

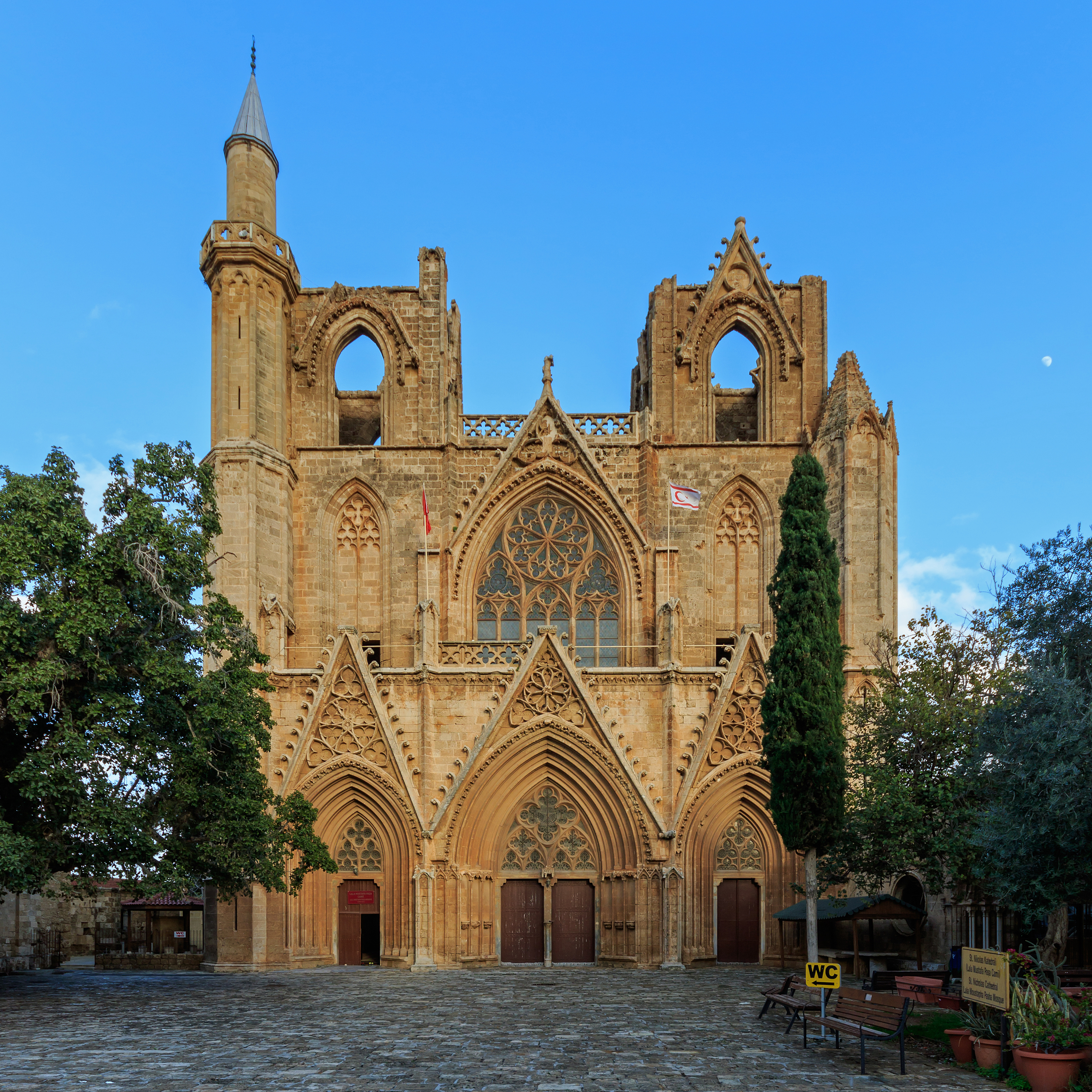
Entrance facade of the converted cathedral (Lala Mustafa Pasha Mosque)

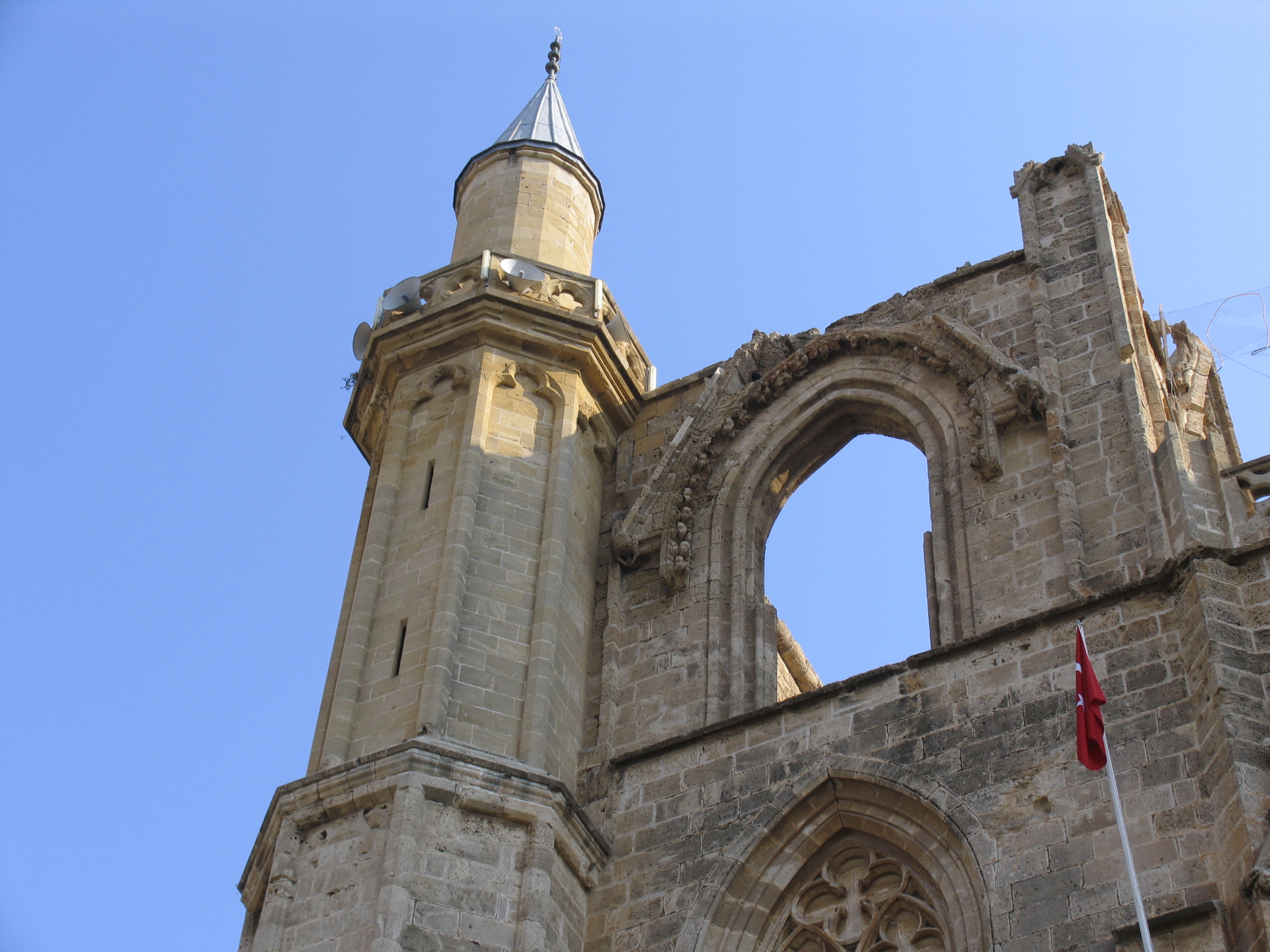
The Minaret of the Lala Mustafa Pasha Mosque

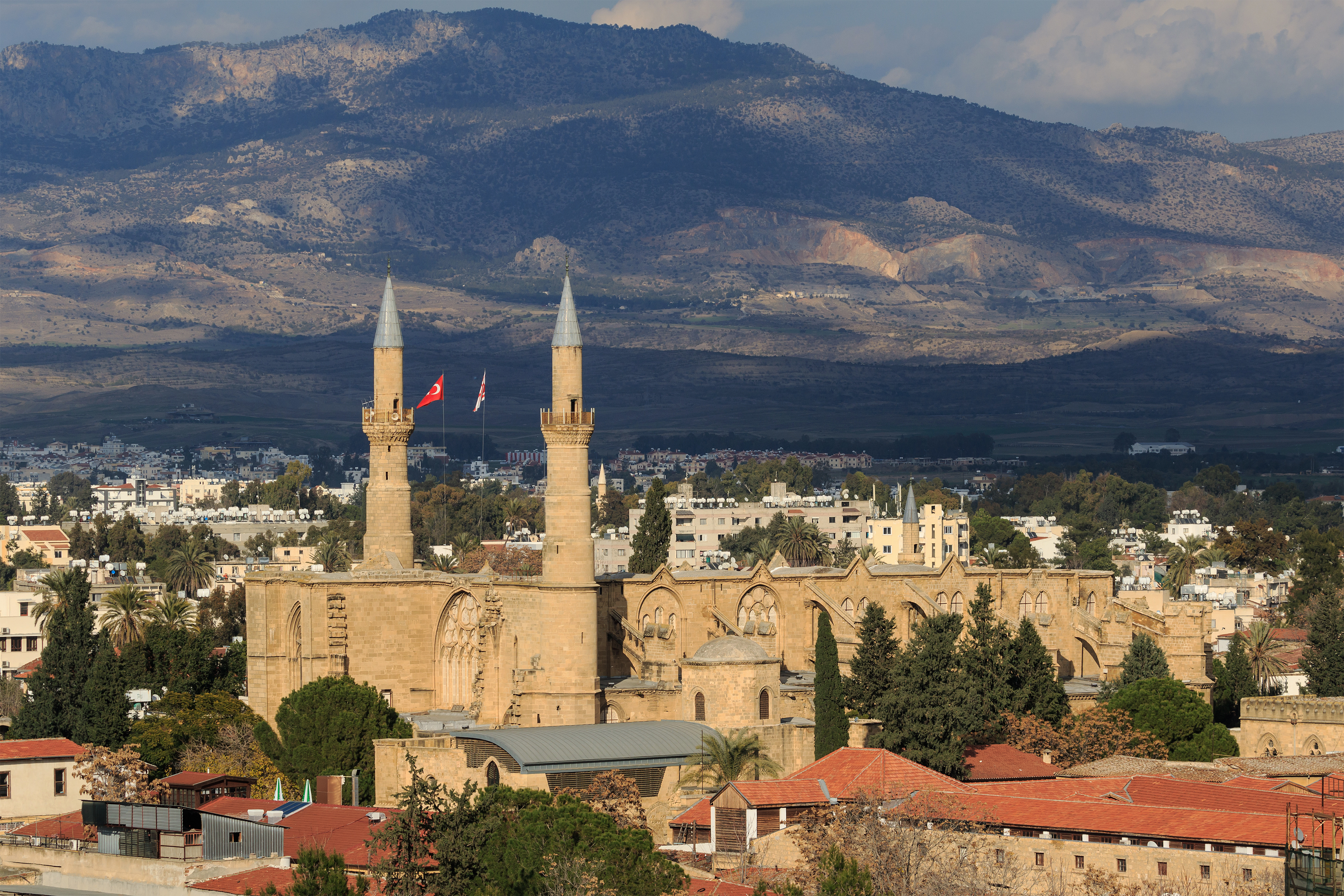
The Selimiye Mosque in Nicosia, general view

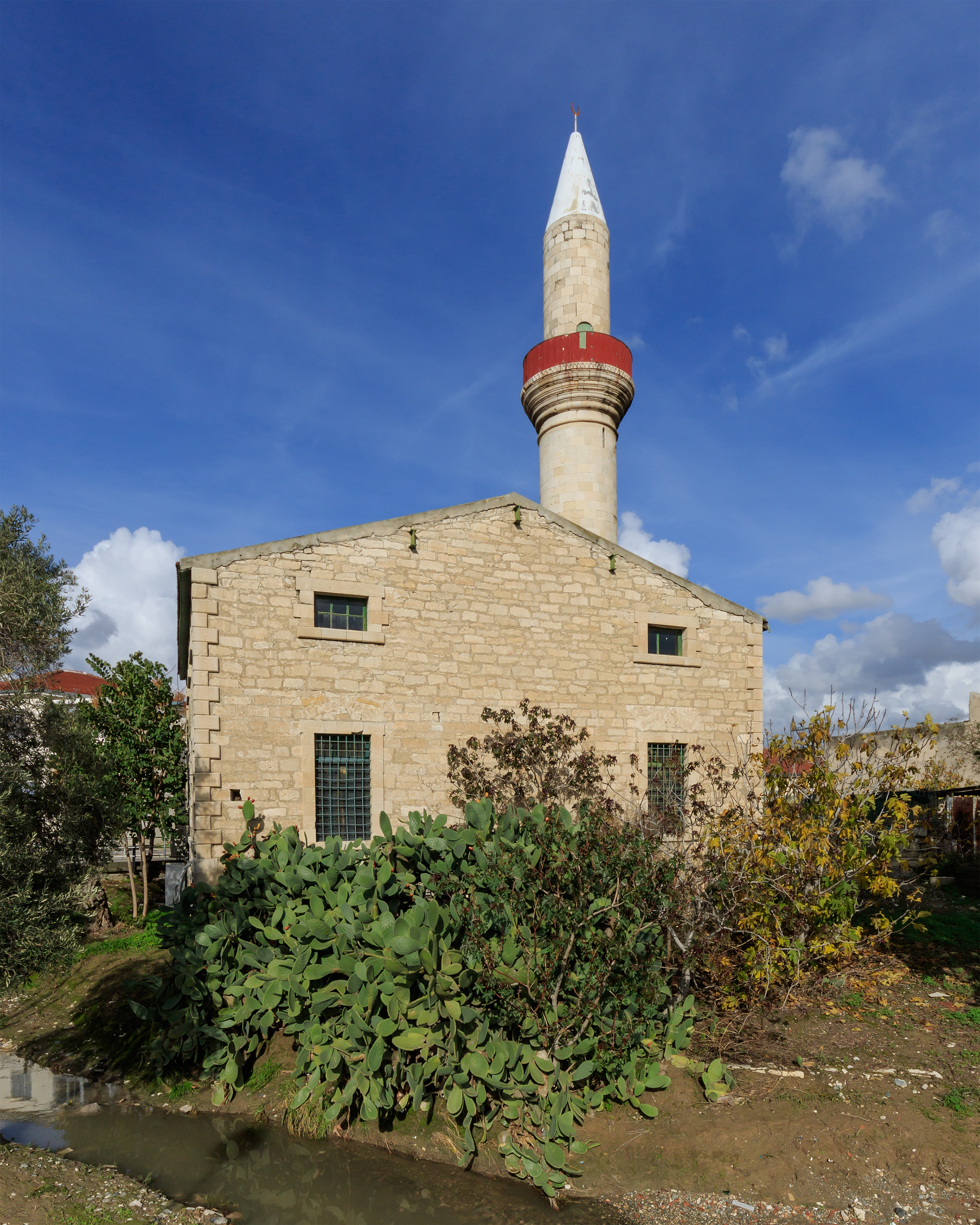
Turkish Mosque in Limassol

== See also ==
- Religion in Cyprus
  - Freedom of religion in Northern Cyprus
  - List of mosques in Cyprus
- Religion in Northern Cyprus
