= Karamanzade =

Neighbourhood of Nicosia, Cyprus

- Karamanzade, Καραμανζαντέ
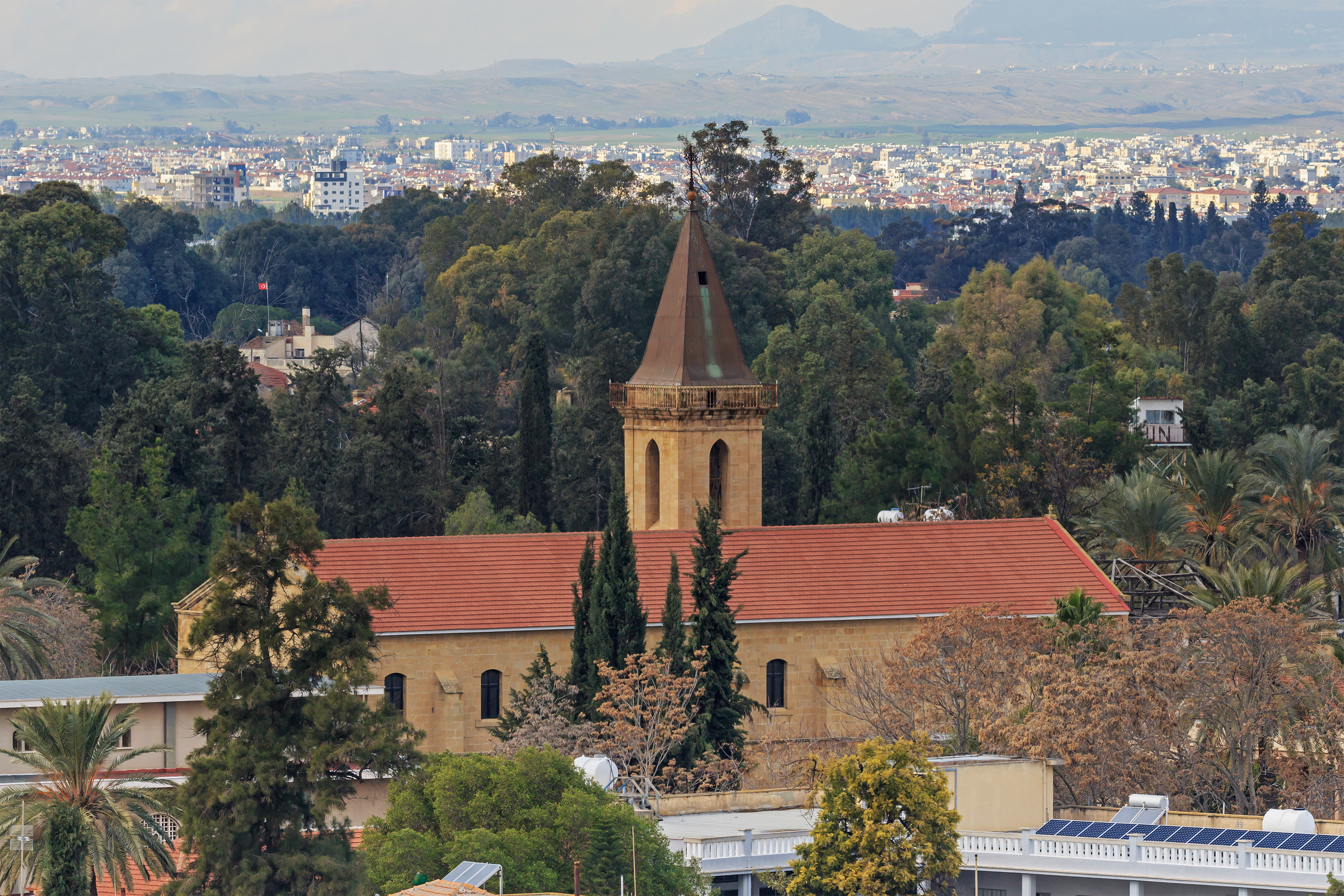
- Holy Cross Church

- Location in Cyprus
- Coordinates: 35°10′31.6″N 33°21′30.8″E
- Country: Cyprus
- District: Nicosia District
- Municipality: Nicosia

Population (2011)
  - Total: 351
- Time zone: UTC+2 (EET)
  - Summer (DST): UTC+3 (EEST)

Karamanzade (Armenian: Քարամանզադե; Greek: Καραμανζαντέ; Turkish: Karamanzade) is a quarter (mahalle) of Nicosia, Cyprus. It is named after Karamanzade, one of the generals in the Ottoman conquest of Cyprus in 1570. He was known as Karaman-zade meaning the son of an inhabitant of Karamania.

== Location ==
Karamanzade is in western Nicosia within the walls, next to Paphos Gate, straddling the Green Line.

It is bordered on the north by the Arab Ahmet quarter, to the east by Iplik Bazar–Korkut Effendi, and to the south by Nebethane and Ayios Andreas.

== Population ==
Population according to the yearly censuses in which where the quarter was reported separately.

Date	Houses	Turkish Cypriot	Greek Cypriot	Other ◊	Total
1572	18				
1612	23				
1672	14				
1831		42		114	156
1881	47				234
1891	83	80		334	414
1901	67	53		339	392
1911	68	35		298	333
1921	79	38		495	533
1931*	94	65		708	773
1946	188	61	124	412	597
2006		429			429
2011		351			351

◊ Principally Armenian and non-Muslims

* The 1831 Ottoman census only included males

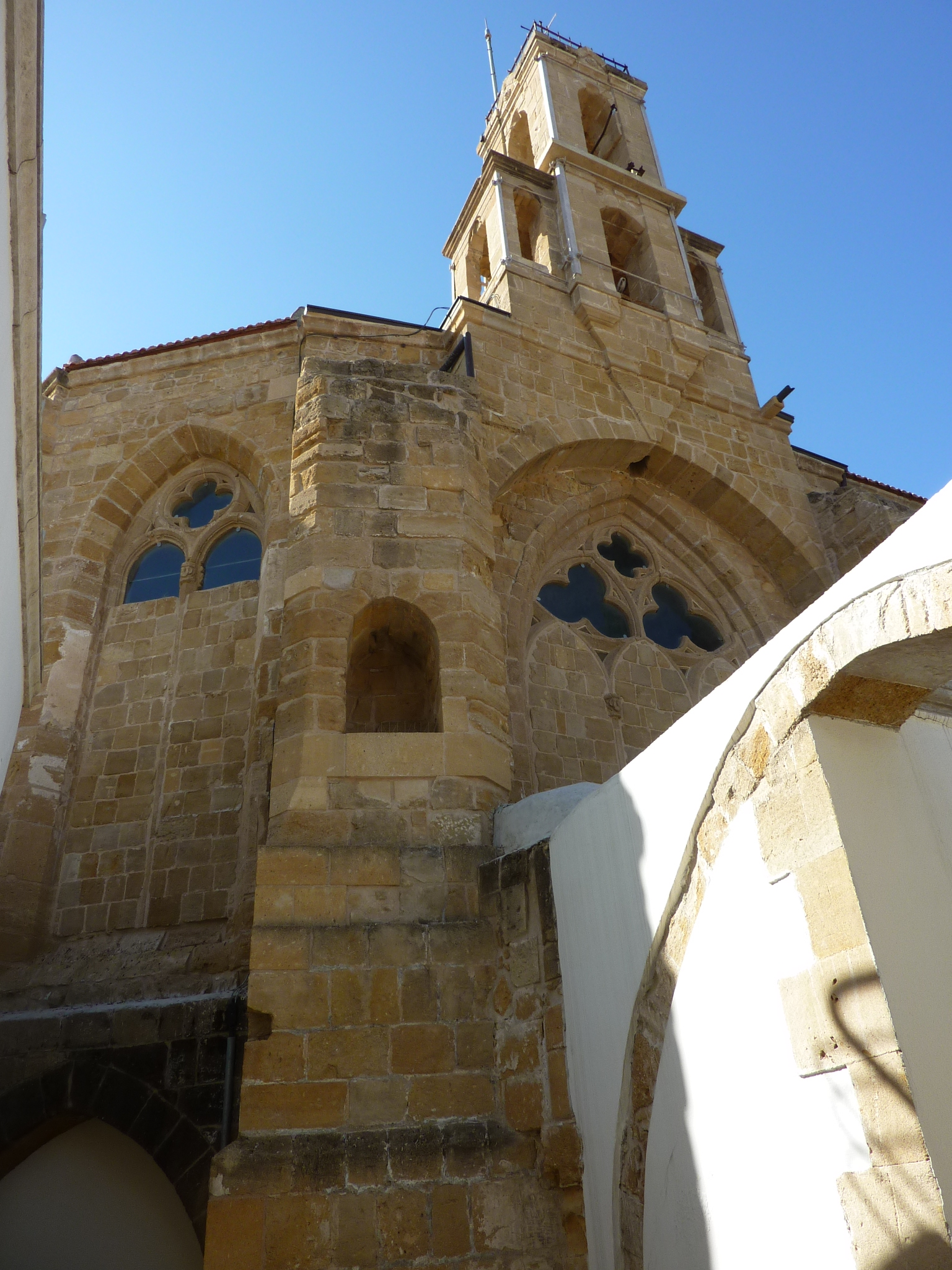
Armenian Church

== History ==
Karamanzade is one of the 24 historic quarters within the walls of Nicosia. During the Ottoman period it was counted as an Armenian quarter.

Leontios Machairas (1369–1458) and Georgios Boustronios (1430–1501) record that the Armenian Quarter of Nicosia was located near the gate of St. Dominic (now Paphos Gate) in the 15th century, during the Lusignan Kingdom of Cyprus. After the Ottoman conquest of Nicosia in 1570, an Ottoman decree issued on 15 May 1571, gave what is now the Armenian church to the Armenian community. During Ottoman rule, starting with the 1572 census, there was a quarter recorded as "Ermeniyan Mahalle" (in Turkish), i.e. Armenian Quarter, alongside Karamanzade and the 1831 census it is recorded that one was 100% Armenian and the other 100% Muslim. Nicosia was divided into Mahalles or quarters, each of which was concentrated around the population's place of worship. The Armenians had their own quarter, which was in the western-most part of the city, adjacent to Paphos Gate. Armenians and Turks lived together in Karamanzade - the area next to Paphos gate, each belonging to their own administrative quarter, but inhabiting the same part of the city. This geographical area was in 1831 around 70% Armenian. This is also reflected in the later British census figures for Karamanzade.

After the Cyprus crisis of 1963–1964 the Armenian community (most of the population) was expelled from the area.

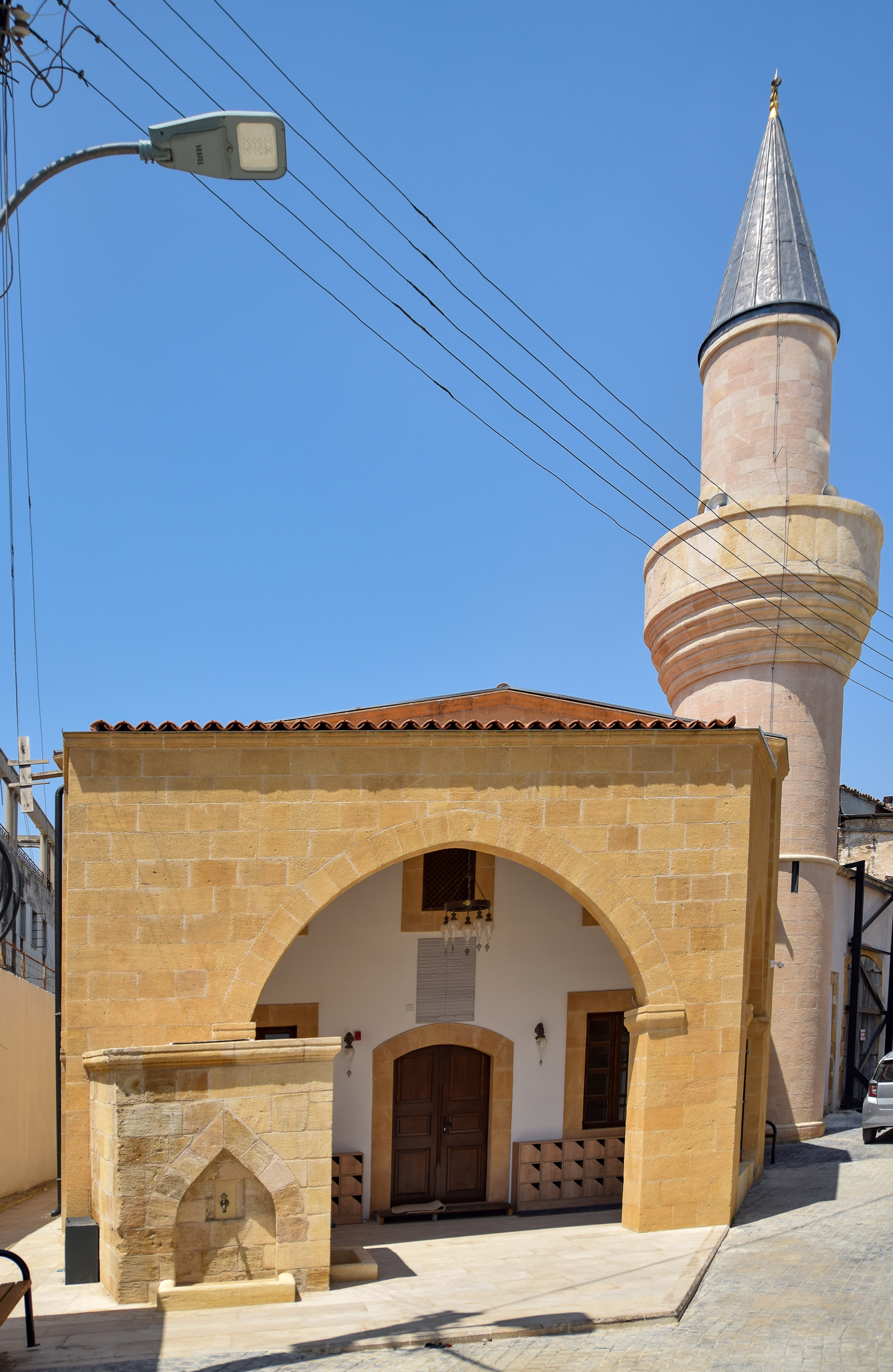
Dükkanlar Önü Mosque

== Landmarks ==
=== Armenian Church ===
The Armenian Church dates from the 14th century. Originally part of a Benedictine monastery, then a salt store, it was allocated to the Armenians after the Ottoman conquest. Conservation work on the church began in 2007 as part of the Nicosia Master Plan.

=== Dukkanlar Onou Mosque ===
The Dükkanlar Önü Mosque was the mosque of the Karamanzade quarter. Originally a Venetian secular building, after the Ottoman conquest of Cyprus, the building was converted to a mosque. The building was renovated by Said Mehmed Agha in 18th century. It had an outsized minaret, which was demolished in 1952 as it was in a dangerous condition. From 2011, the Evkaf Administration of Cyprus, began restoration of the mosque and a new shorter minaret has been built.

=== Church of the Holy Cross ===
The original Roman Catholic Church of the Holy Cross was built in 1642 but was replaced in April 1900, partly funded by the Spanish royal family and opened again in 1902. The western side of the chapel of 1642 remains, but the east end was removed to enable the construction of the larger building in 1900.

The Church of the Holy Cross was not abandoned during the Cyprus crisis of 1963–1964 and the Turkish invasion of 1974. However part of the access was blocked towards Victoria Street.

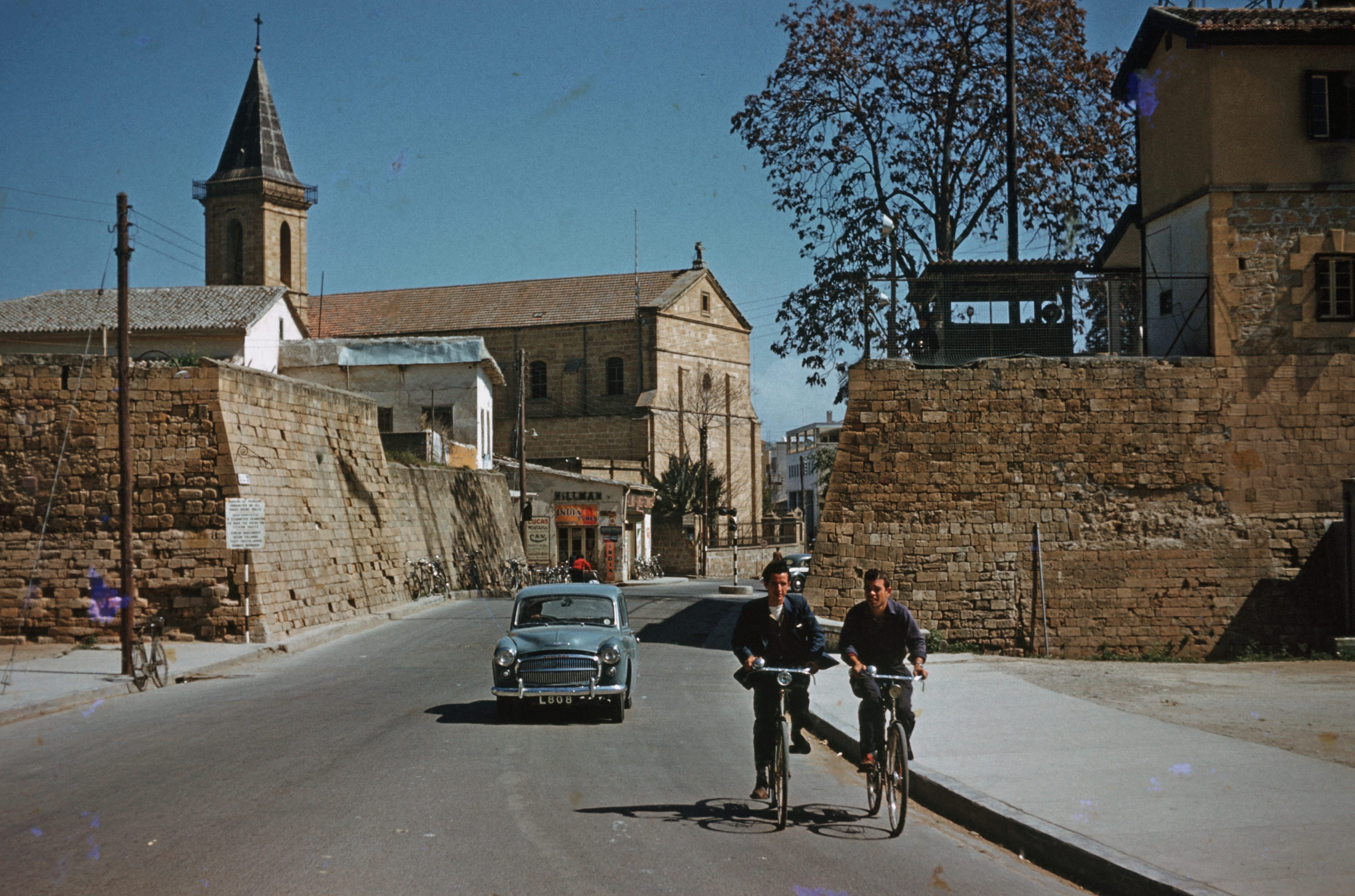
Paphos Gate opening and Holy Cross (1958)

=== Paphos Gate opening ===
The original Paphos Gate was closed by the British when they made the new opening at the side through the ramparts in 1879. This forms the entrance to the quarter from outside the walled city. The north side of the street is in Karamanzade and the south side in Ayios Andreas.
