= Ömeriye Hamam =

14th-century hammam in Cyprus

Coordinates: 35.1726°N 33.3654°E

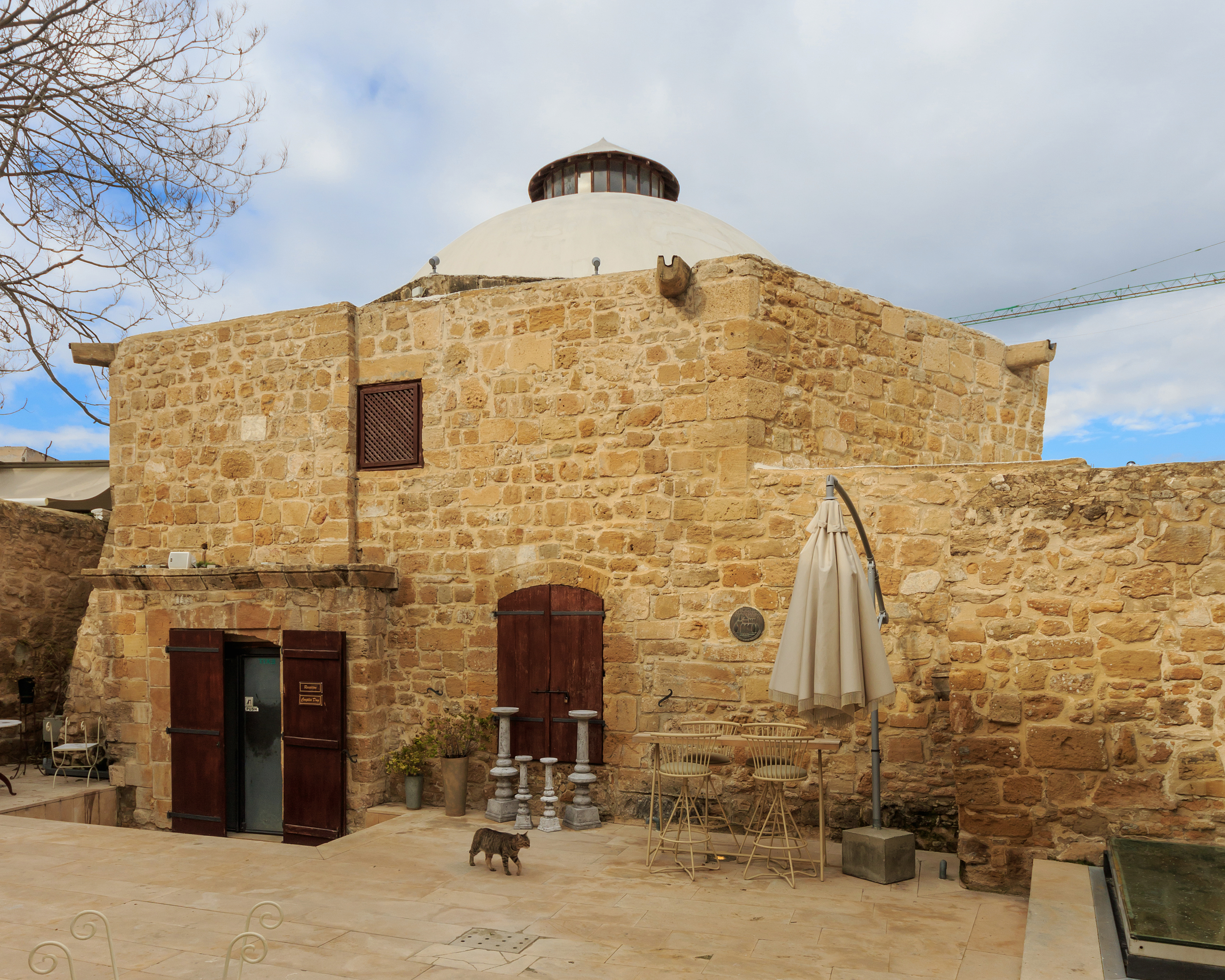
Ömeriye Hamam, Nicosia

Old Ömeriye Hamam, Nicosia

Ömeriye Hamam, Lying on the Hot Stone

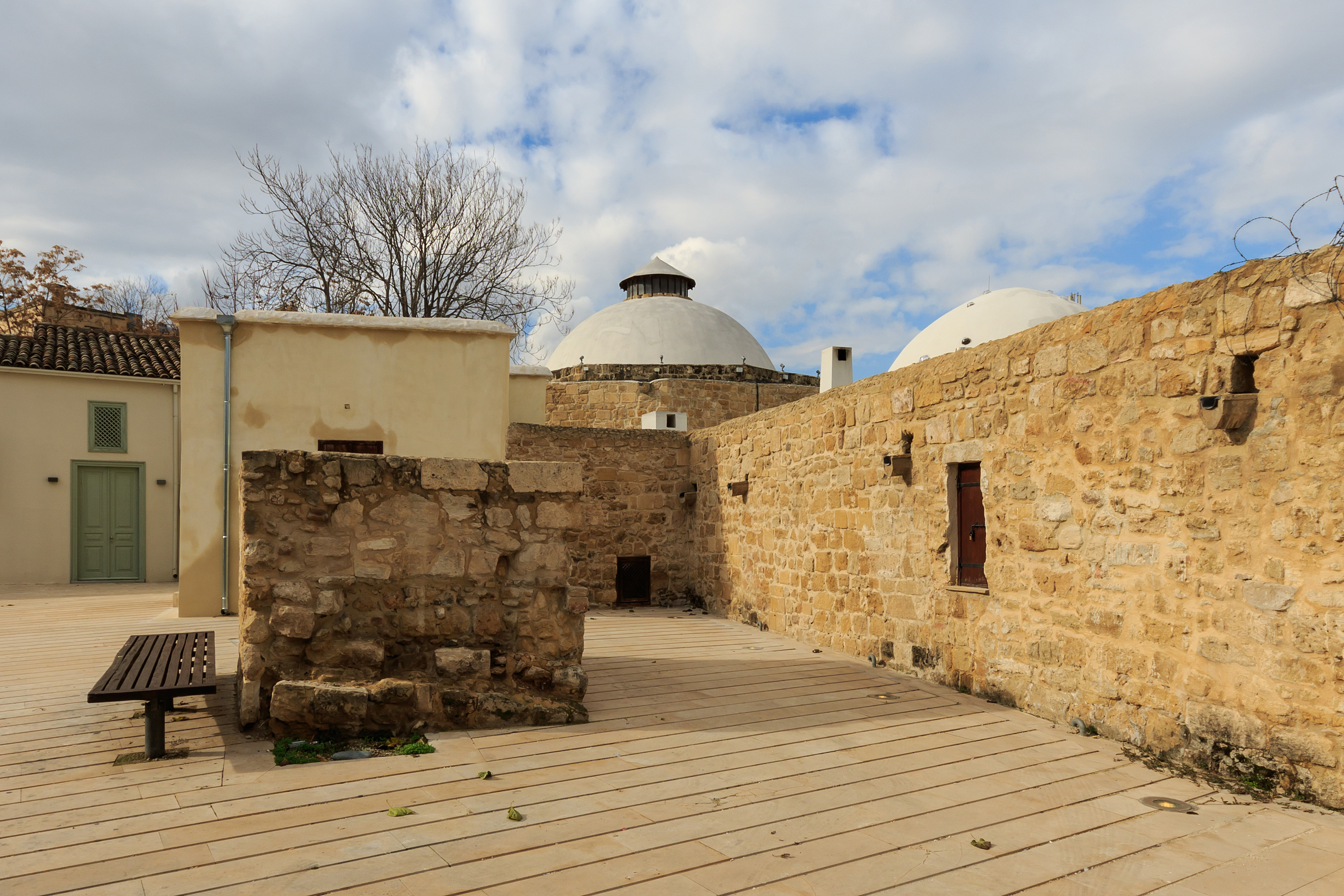
Ömeriye Hamam

Ömeriye Hamam (lit. 'Ömeriye Bath') in Nicosia, Cyprus is a historic Ottoman hammam (public bathhouse). It was created by Lala Mustafa Pasha in the 1570s, soon after the Ottoman conquest of Cyprus, and was part of the larger complex of the Ömeriye Mosque dedicated to the memory of the Caliph Omar. The complex reused the earlier 14th-century Augustinian church of St. Mary which was damaged in the Ottoman siege. The hammam was restored in 2002–2004 as part of the Lefkosia Master Plan and is still in use today as a bathhouse and spa.

== History of Ömeriye Hamam ==
The site's history dates back to the 14th century, when it stood as an Augustinian church of St. Mary. Stone-built, with small domes, it is chronologically placed at around the time of Frankish and Venetian rule, approximately the same time that the city acquired its Venetian Walls. In 1571, Mustapha Pasha converted the church into a mosque, believing that this particular spot is where the prophet Omer rested during his visit to Nicosia.

Most of the original building was destroyed by Ottoman artillery, although the door of the main entrance still belongs to the 14th century Lusignan building, whilst remains of a later Renaissance phase can be seen at the north-eastern side of the monument. In 2003, the [EU] funded a bi-communal UNDP/UNOPS project, "Partnership for the Future", in collaboration with Nicosia Municipality and Nicosia Master Plan, to restore the Omerye Bath.

== Spa and wellness ==
The hamam is still in use today and after its recent restoration project, it has become a favourite place for relaxation in Nicosia. In 2006 it received the Europa Nostra prize for the Conservation of Architectural Heritage.
