= Ömeriye Mosque =

Mosque in Nicosia, Cyprus

- Τέμενος Ομεριέ / Ömeriye Camii
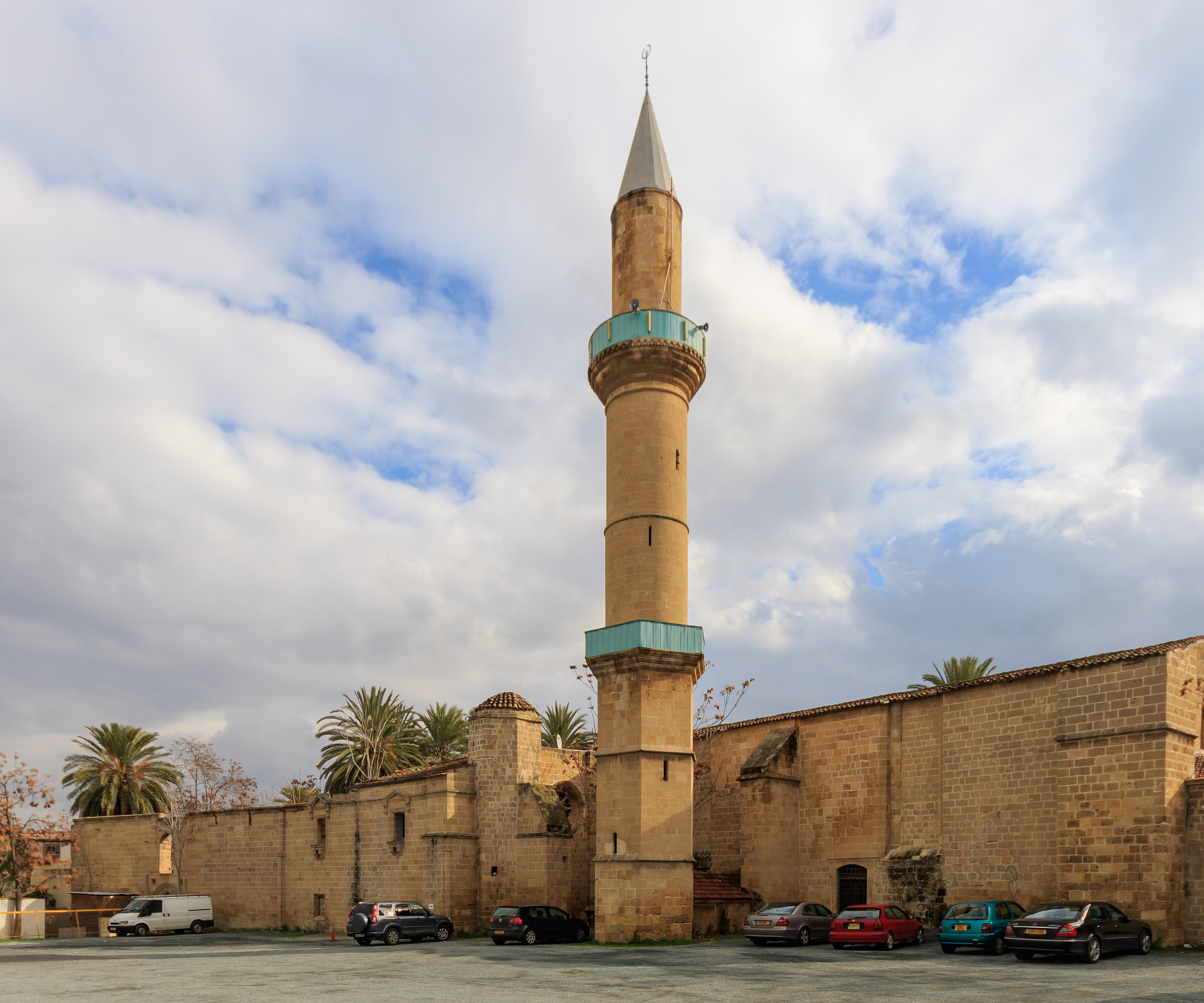
- View of Omeriye Mosque from the side of its minaret.

Religion
- Affiliation: Islam
- District: Nicosia District
- Status: Active

Location
- Location: Nicosia, Cyprus (South section)
- Interactive map of Ömeriye Mosque
- Coordinates: 35.1719°N 33.3654°E

Architecture
- Style: Ottoman-Turkish architecture
- Completed: 1571

Specifications
- Length: ~60m
- Width: ~20m
- Minaret: 1

Ömeriye Mosque (Greek: Τέμενος Ομεριέ Temenos Omerié, Turkish: Ömeriye Camii), is a mosque in the walled city of Nicosia on the island of Cyprus, located in the south section of Nicosia. Following the Turkish invasion of Cyprus, the mosque gained significance as one of the most important sites of Muslim worship in the non-Muslim section of the island and the city.

Currently the mosque is functioning and open for both worshippers and visitors.

== History ==
The site of the mosque was originally occupied by the Augustinian Church of Saint Mary, which dated back to the 14th century. During the Ottoman-Venetian War of 1570–73, the church was first heavily damaged during the siege of Nicosia in 1570, and was eventually levelled after the war.

After the Turkish conquest of Cyprus, Lala Mustafa Pasha, the Ottoman commander, ordered a mosque to be built on the site of the former church, based on a popular belief that Umar, second caliph of Islam, was buried at this site in 7th century.

According to Turkish Cypriot folklore, the Ömeriye Mosque is the first mosque where Turks prayed on the island following its conquest in 1571.

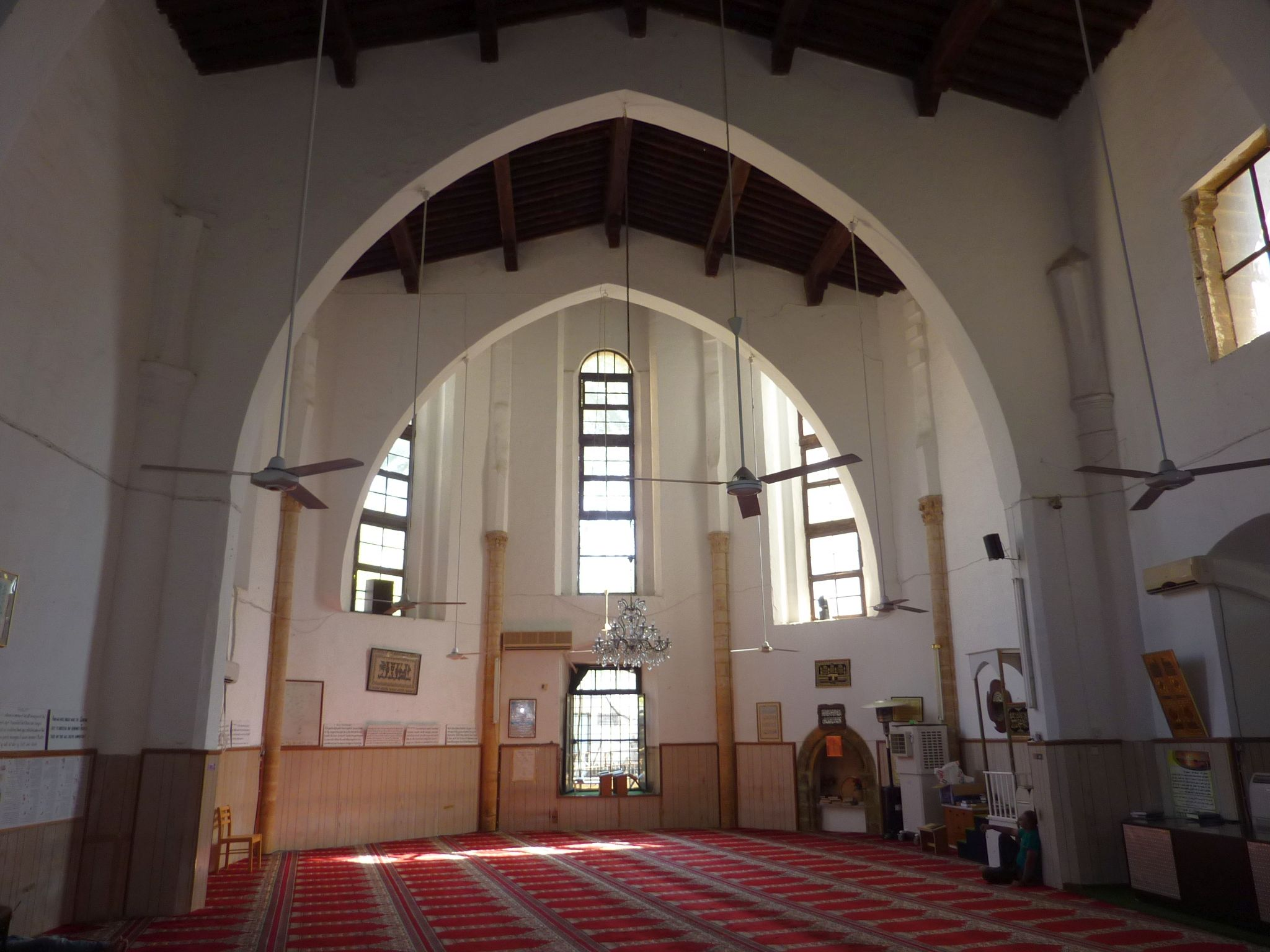
Western Asp

=== Current status ===
Currently, the mosque is active and open for both worshipers and tourists. Today, it is mostly used by the diverse Muslim community living in Nicosia's old town, including Arabs and Africans. Also, Turkish Cypriots who cross to the south section of Nicosia use the mosque during their daily trips.

On 3 June 2014, the Turkish Cypriot Director of Religious Affairs, Talip Atalay, visited the Ömeriye mosque while visiting several sacred Muslim spots located in the south section of Cyprus, following an invitation from Archbishop Chrysostomos II of Cyprus as part of the Religious Track of the Cyprus Peace Process, under the auspices of the Embassy of Sweden in Nicosia. Atalay was accompanied by the EVKAF Foundation's Chairperson Rauf Ersenal, a native of Tahtakale neighbourhood, whose family fled the area following the 1963 intercommunal violence, never to return.

== Architecture ==
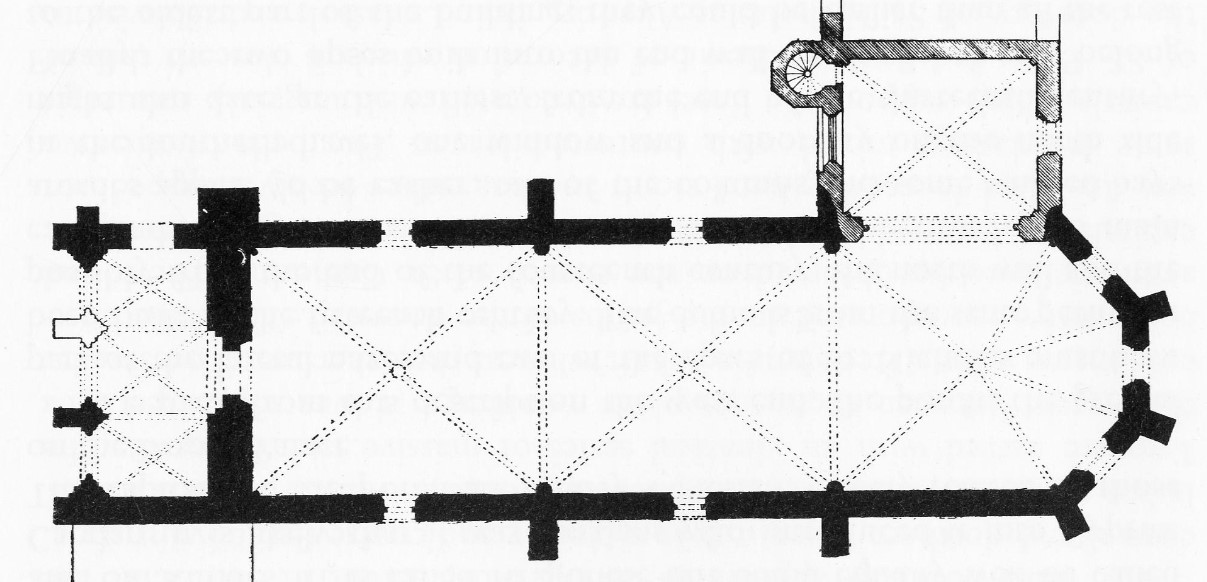
The plan of the mosque from above, drawn by French historian Camille Enlart in his work "L'art gothique et la renaissance en Chypre" (Gothic Renaissance Art in Cyprus) in year 1899.

The construction of the mosque followed a similar groundsplan to the former church, however building of the mosque was conducted in the Islamic style. It nicely exhibits the characteristics of the Ottoman-Turkish architecture with varying elements, such as arches, small domes and a tall Turkish-style minaret easily visible from a distance.

=== Ömeriye Hamam ===
Across the street, there is a hamam (bathhouse) named Ömeriye Hamam, whose construction was also ordered by Lala Mustafa Pasha.

The bath was in framework of the fundings provided by the EU and it functioned as a tourist attraction also open for bathing until 2012. The government of Cyprus stated the closure of the bath was for renovation.

== See also ==
- Ottoman Cyprus
- Islam in Cyprus
- List of mosques in Cyprus
- Turkish Republic of Northern Cyprus
- North Nicosia
