= Akkavuk Mosque =

Mosque in North Nicosia, Northern Cyprus

- Akkavuk Mescidi
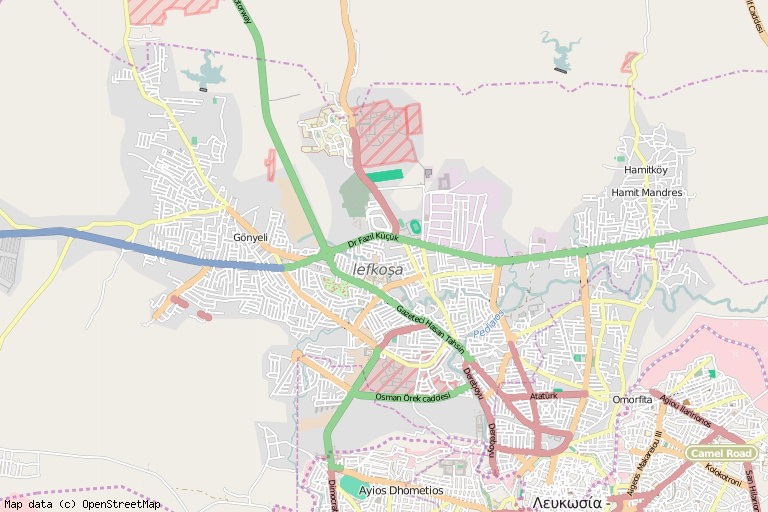
- Location within North Nicosia

Religion
- Affiliation: Islam
- Branch/tradition: Sunni

Location
- Location: North Nicosia, Cyprus
- Interactive map of Akkavuk Mosque
- Coordinates: 35°10′47.5″N 33°21′52.1″E

Architecture
- Type: mosque
- Established: 1902

Specifications
- Capacity: 188 worshipers
- Interior area: 132 m^{2}

Akkavuk Mosque (Turkish: Akkavuk Mescidi); Greek: Τζαμί Ακκαβούκ, romanized: Tzamí Akkavoúk) is a mosque without a minaret in the Akkavuk quarter of Nicosia, currently located in North Nicosia. The mosque was built in 1902, On the site of what appeared to be a small medieval chapel or church. A smaller mosque on the site had been built in 1895. The apse of the original building with a moulded arched window of 16th-century style survived, but all such traces have now been removed.

The mosque is made of cut stone (ashlar) and has a rectangular layout. It has three sharp arches in the front façade, and the space between the arches have been covered by glass in a renovation. On the southern wall at opposite of the entrance, there is a mihrab and a nearby wooden mimbar. The masjid also had a fountain during the British rule.

The mosque has an area of 132 m^{2} and can hold 188 worshipers.

== See also ==
- Islam in Cyprus
