= Turunçlu Mosque =

Mosque in North Nicosia, Northern Cyprus

- Turunçlu Camii
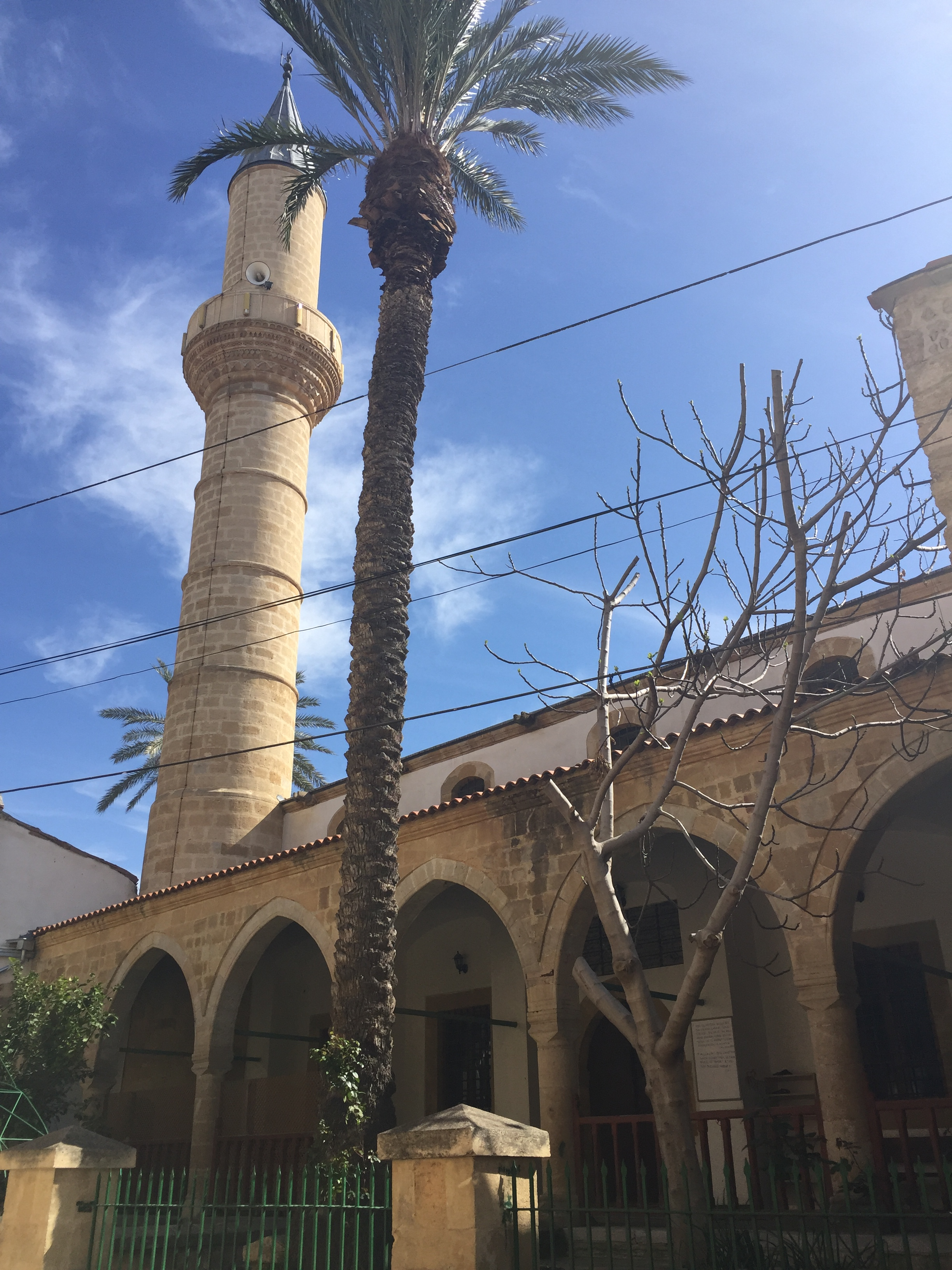

Religion
- Affiliation: Sunni Islam
- Ownership: Evkaf Administration
- Status: Active

Location
- Location: Iplik Bazar–Korkut Effendi, Nicosia, Cyprus
- Municipality: Nicosia Turkish Municipality
- Interactive map of Turunçlu Mosque
- Coordinates: 35°10′33″N 33°21′40″E

Architecture
- Style: Ottoman
- Founder: Seyyit Mehmed Agha
- Completed: 1825

Specifications
- Direction of façade: Northeast
- Capacity: 210 worshippers
- Minaret: One

Turunçlu Mosque (Turkish: Turunçlu Camii), also known as Turunçlu Fethiye Mosque, is a mosque in the Iplik Bazar–Korkut Effendi quarter in the walled city of Nicosia, currently located in North Nicosia. It dates to the Ottoman period. It is located on Beliğ Paşa Street.

The mosque has a capacity of 210 worshippers, with an interior area of 148 m^{2}. As of 2011, its congregation consisted of 32 people.

== History ==
Before the 19th century, a small masjid used to stand at the site. In 1825, Seyyit Mehmed Agha, the governor of Cyprus, had the mosque built in the place of the masjid. Historically, the mosque was known as Fethiye Mosque and was located at Mertek Market. A sıbyan school (a historical elementary school) was attached to this masjid, the school was also torn down by Mehmed Agha and replaced with a new school called "Mekteb-i İrfane" (School of Knowledge). By 1894, the school was recorded to be too small to accommodate all its students. Despite the repeated pleas of the school administration, the school was not renovated and by 1904, it had become ruinous. As a result, the school building was demolished in the 1900s and replaced by a new one.

In 1972, an external wall of the mosque collapsed; this wall was later reconstructed.

== Architecture ==
The mosque has a rectangular plan in the northeast-southwest orientation. The front northern façade is supported by six sharp arches, whereas the western façade is supported by four. The mihrab and minbar show baroque characteristics.

There is a wooden mezzanine in the northeast that serves as the women's section. This part is accessed via wooden stairs. The cylindrical minaret stands at the northeast and has one ornate balcony. The minaret is accessed through the prayer place of the mosque.

There is an inscription on the entrance date, dated to 1825, containing verse in Ottoman Turkish.
