= Arab Ahmet Mosque =

Mosque in North Nicosia, Northern Cyprus

Coordinates: 35.1771°N 33.3579°E

Arab Ahmet Mosque Arabahmet Camii
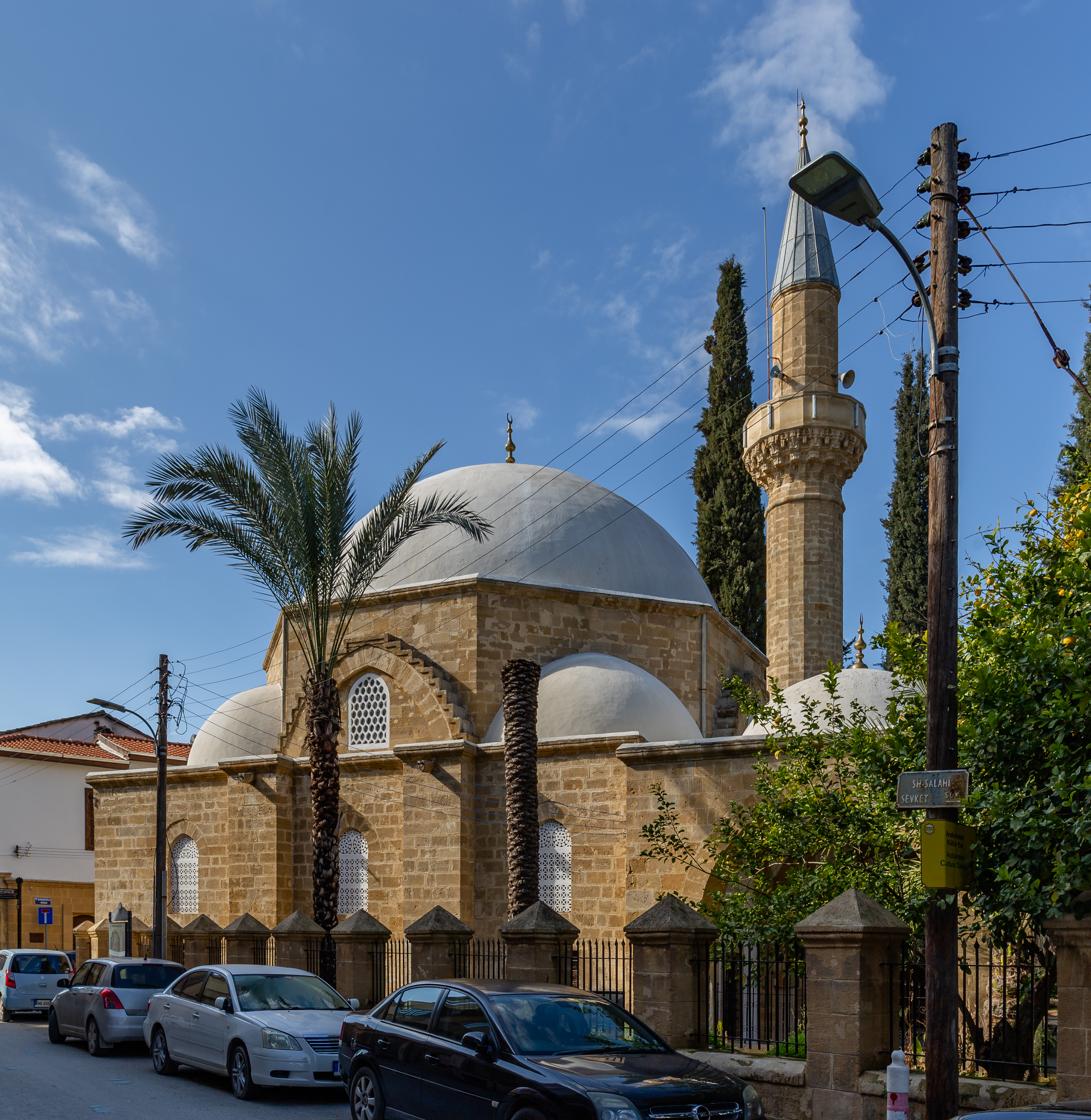

Religion
- Affiliation: Islam
- Branch/tradition: Sunni

Location
- Location: North Nicosia, Northern Cyprus
- Interactive map of Arab Ahmet Mosque; Arabahmet Camii

Architecture
- Type: Mosque
- Style: Ottoman
- Established: 16th century

Arab Ahmet Mosque (Turkish: Arabahmet Camii) is situated in the western Arab Ahmet Quarter of North Nicosia, Northern Cyprus. It was built in the late 16th century. The mosque is named after a commander of the 1571 Ottoman army. The mosque is the tombs of some important persons of the past in its garden.

It is an example of the classical Ottoman architecture. Due to the extensive renovation required, it was renovated in 1845. It is rectangular and the only mosque in Cyprus to exhibit a typical Turkish dome. A large central dome covers the main body of the mosque and three smaller ones cover its entrance. Four more cover its corners.

This mosque consists of a large hemispherical dome (about 6 metres diameter) carried on the usual Byzantine cruciform plan with pendentives. In front of the mosque is a porch covered with three smaller domes. No moulded or carved details relieve the severe simplicity of this characteristic Turkish monument. The current structure dates from 1845.

On the site of the Arab Ahmet Mosque stood a church of which a few mutilated fragments still survive scattered about the mosque enclosure, and in neighbouring houses. A lintel from a door on which a shield is carved with the bearing of two lions affronted, may be seen stuck in the ground. But the most singular survival from the ancient church consists of a small collection of 14th century gravestones.

A number of fragmentary inscribed stones amongst which the most interesting contain the names of Gaspar Mavroceni of the well-known Venetian family of that name, 1402, and Hugh de Mimars, 1324. Many of these fragments are in the usual type of medieval Greek script. There are also two tomb-slabs of the same design, in the low relief renaissance style of Italy of the 16th century which seem never to have been completed with inscriptions or the coats of arms for which shields have been provided. These two slabs are the only ones in the collection in the relief style.

== Gallery ==
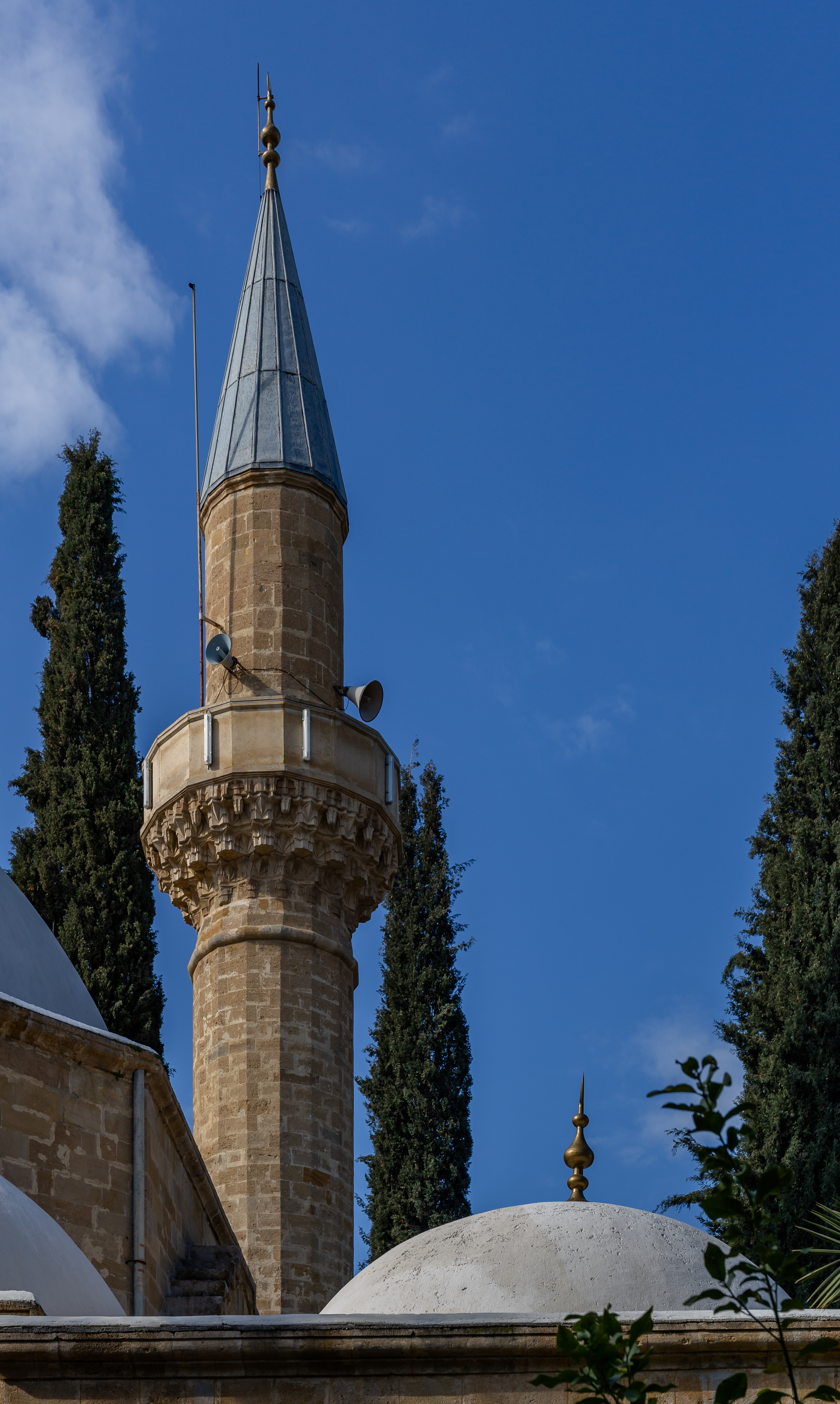

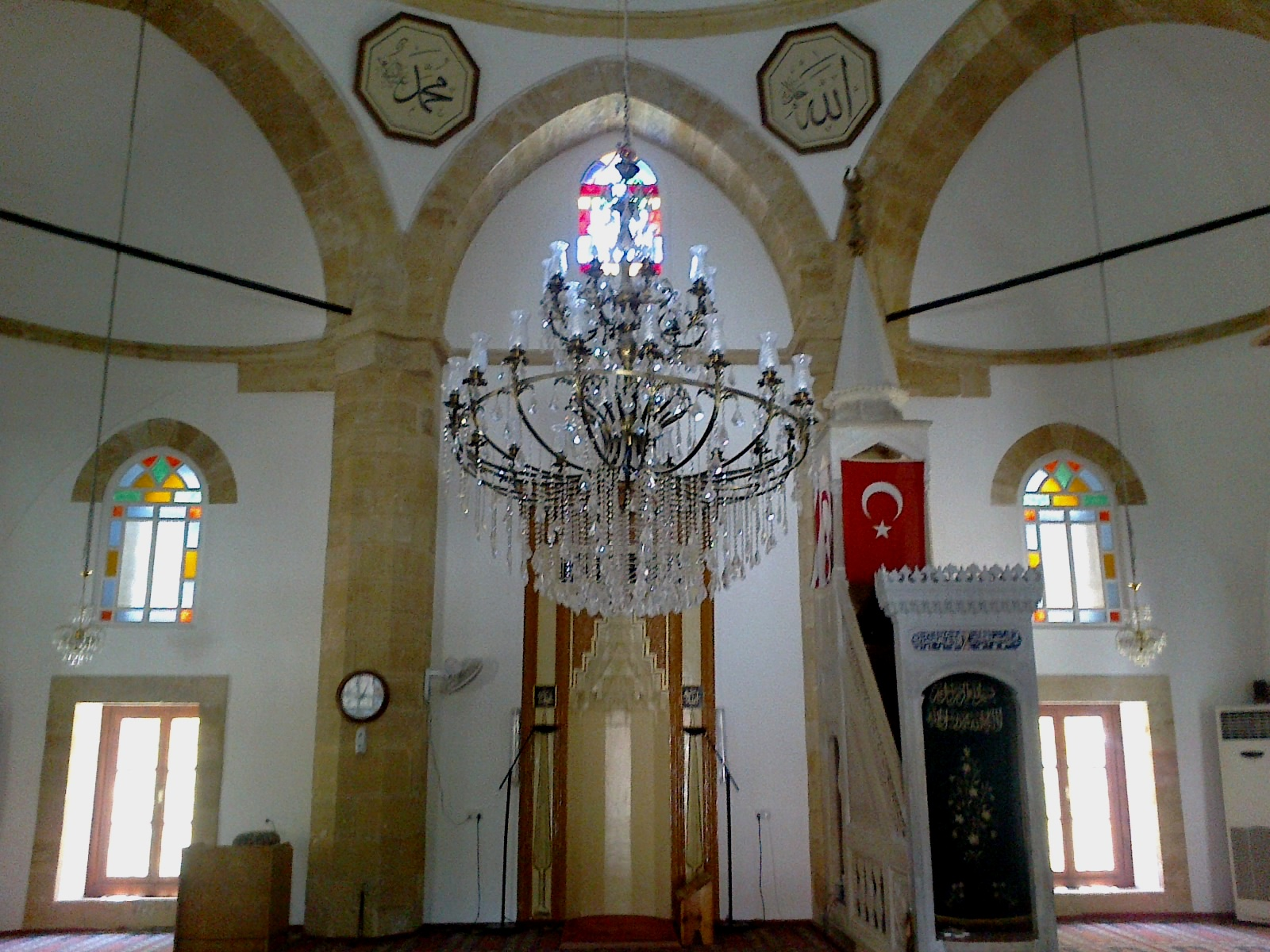

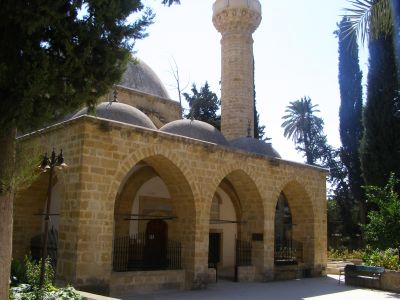

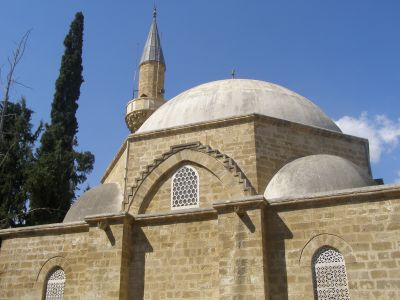

== See also ==
- List of mosques in Cyprus
- List of mosques
