= Dükkanlar Önü Mosque =

Mosque in North Nicosia, Cyprus

- Dükkanlar Önü Camii
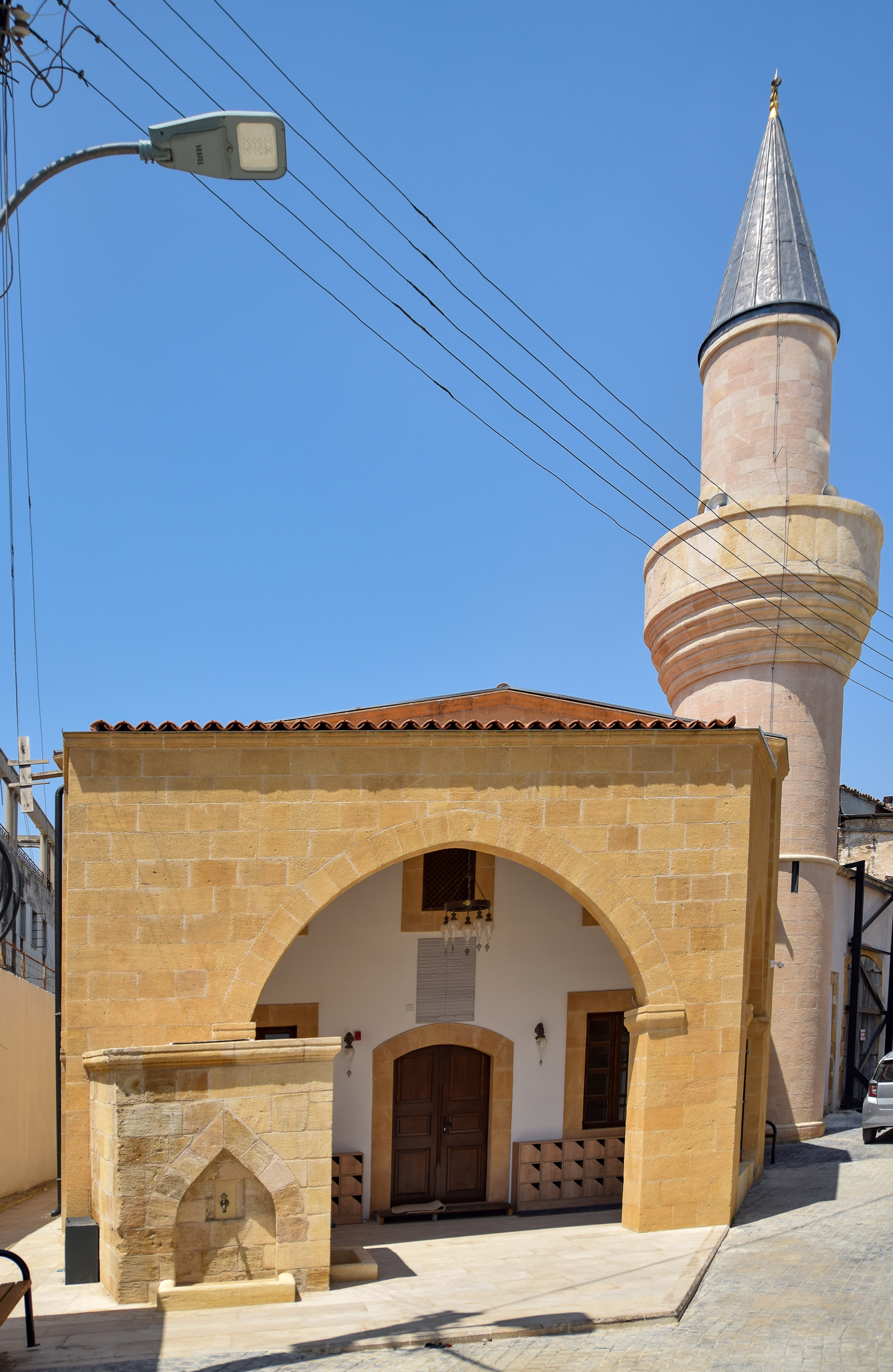

- Location within Cyprus

Religion
- Affiliation: Islam
- Branch/tradition: Sunni

Location
- Location: North Nicosia, Cyprus
- Interactive map of Dükkanlar Önü Mosque
- Coordinates: 35.17461°N 33.35872°E

Architecture
- Type: Mosque

Dükkanlar Önü Mosque (Turkish: Dükkanlar Önü Camii) is a mosque in the Karamanzade quarter of North Nicosia.

According to George Jeffery, who called it the "Tevfik Masjid", the mosque is originally a Venetian building, most probably built as an inn due its resemblance to the 16th century inns of Italy. The building had Gothic arches and engravings from the 14th century, which Muzaffer Haşmet Gürkan described as "ornate". After the Ottoman conquest of Cyprus, the building was converted into a mosque. In the beginning of the 18th century, the building was renovated by Said Mehmed Agha.

The minaret of the mosque was demolished in 1952 as it was considered dangerous. On 6 September 1962, a large part of the mosque collapsed, killing a Greek Cypriot woman passing by. The incident caused criticism of the newly founded Nicosia Turkish Municipality, whose response was deemed insufficient. The newspaper Bozkurt described the mosque at the time as "a building with no architectural or artistic significance, which rather served to meet the religious needs of a commercial neighborhood". The collapse destroyed the entrance arch and other architectural elements of the mosque.

In 2011, the Turkish Evkaf Department, in collaboration with the local Evkaf Administration, announced that the mosque would be restored.
