= Camille Enlart =

French archaeologist and art historian

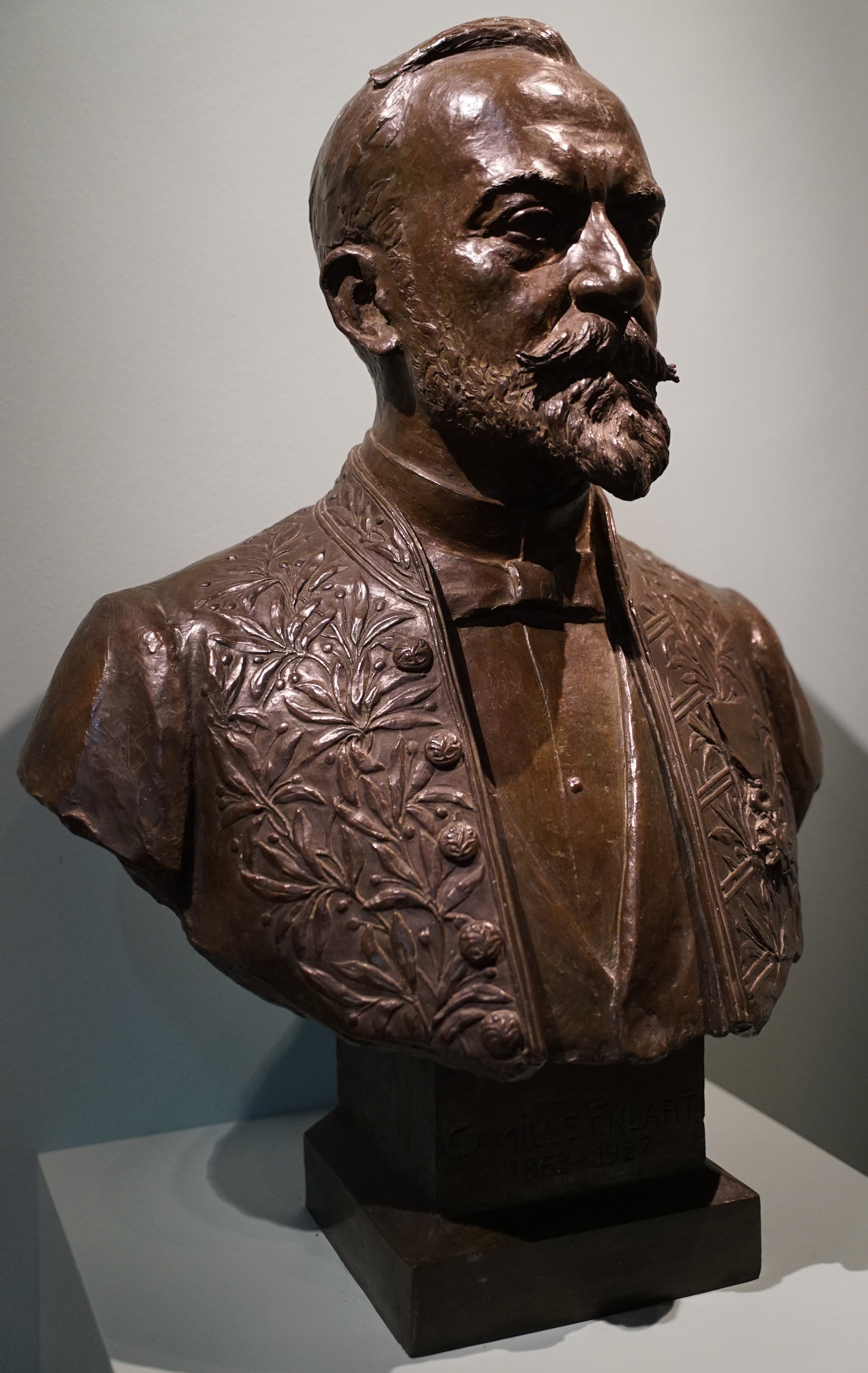
- Enlart bust at Le Vergeur Museum, by Paul Graf in 1928
- Born: 22 November 1862; Boulogne-sur-Mer, France
- Died: 14 February 1927 (aged 64); Paris, France
- Occupations: Art historian, archaeologist

Signature
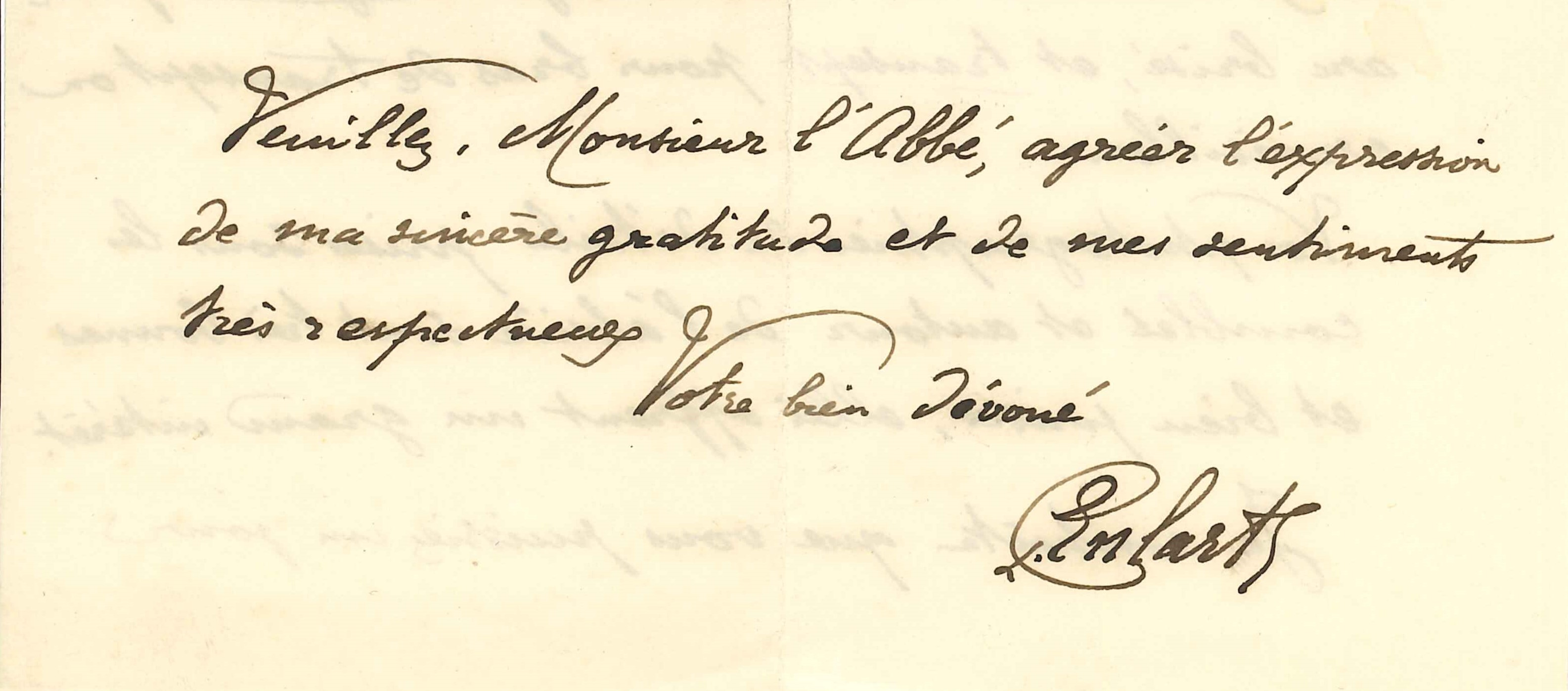

Camille Enlart (22 November 1862 – 14 February 1927) was a French archaeologist and art historian. His areas of special interest were the Middle Ages and photography.

== Biography ==
Enlart initially learned painting at the Beaux-Arts de Paris, then studied Law at the École Nationale des Chartes in 1885–1889. In 1893, he was appointed as assistant librarian at the École des Beaux-Arts after a two-year trip to Italy. Between 1894 and 1899, he was deputy to Robert de Lasteyrie at the École Nationale des Chartes. He taught medieval archeology at the École Spéciale d'Architecture and the École du Louvre. In 1903, he became director of the Musée national des Monuments Français; he held this position until his death.

== Publications ==
- Monuments religieux de l'architecture romane dans les diocèses d'Amiens, d'Arras et de Thérouanne. Positions de thèse. Paris : École des chartes, 1889.
- Origines de l'architecture gothique en Italie. Paris: Bibliothèque des Écoles françaises d'Athènes et de Rome, 1894.
- L'art gothique et la renaissance en Chypre : illustré de 34 planches et de 421 figures. Paris, 1899.
- Manuel d'archéologie française, depuis les temps reculés jusqu'à la Renaissance. T. I : Architecture religieuse. Paris : Picard, 1902, 816 p. 2^{e} éd. augm. : Paris, 1919–1920, 938 p.; t. II : Architecture civile et militaire. Paris: Picard, 1904, 856 p. 2^{e} éd. augm. : Architecture civile. Paris : Picard, 1929. Architecture militaire, Paris : Picard, 1932; t. III : Costumes. Paris : Picard, 1916, 856 p.
- La Renaissance en France, l'Architecture et la Décoration. Paris : Editions Albert Morancé, Series 1 - approx. 1913, Series 2 - 1921.
- Hôtel et beffrois du nord de la France : Moyen Âge et Renaissance. Paris : H. Laurens, 1919, 64 p.
- Villes mortes du Moyen Âge. Paris : É. de Boccard, 1920, 164 p.
- Les Monuments des Croisés dans le Royaume de Jérusalem; préf. de Paul Léon. Paris, 1925–1929, 2 vol.
- Deux inscriptions françaises trouvées à Chypre. Syria. 8(3),1927, 234-238.
- Manuel d'archéologie: la Renaissance en France, architecture et sculpture. Paris, ouvrage posthume, 1928.
- Histoire de l'art depuis les premiers temps chrétiens jusqu'à nos jours. Collab. de Camille Enlart et al., André Michel, dir., ouvrage posthume. Paris: A. Colin, 1929.

== Awards ==
- 1910: Knight of the Legion of Honor

== Photography ==
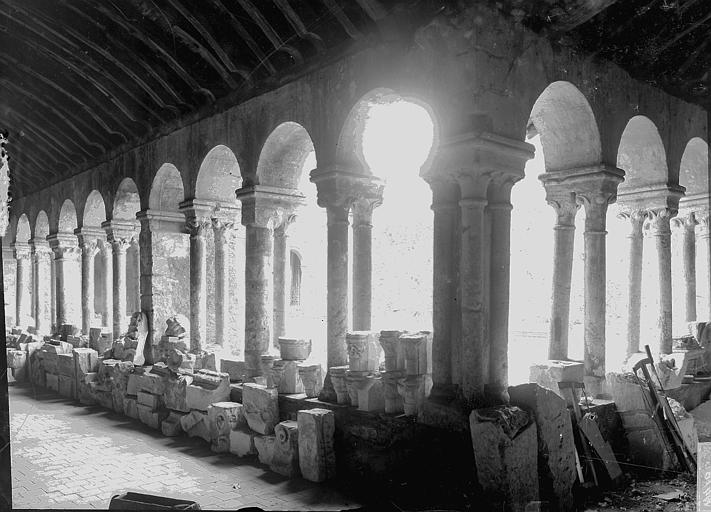
Hôpital Saint-Jean d'Angers

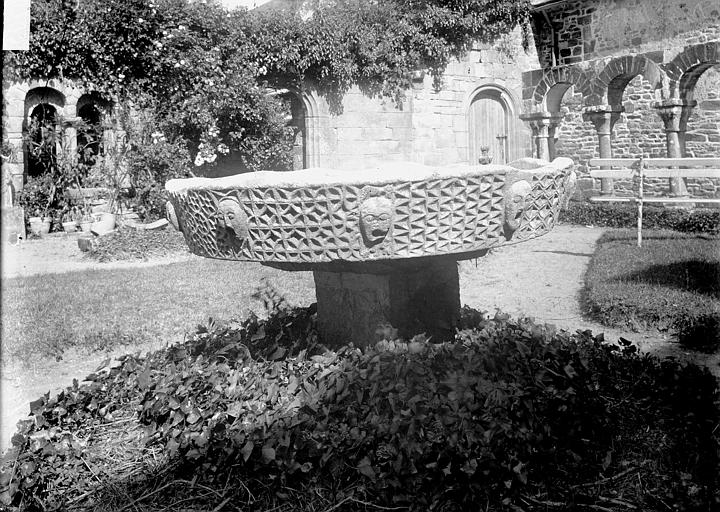
Daoulas at the start of the 20th century

== Bibliography ==
- Claude Seiller, Jacques Thiébaut, Collection Camille Enlart : Boulogne-sur-Mer, musée des Beaux-Arts et d'Archéologie, Exposition du 26 juin au 30 octobre 1977, Ed. Boulogne-sur-Mer, Musée des Beaux-Arts et d'Archéologie, 1977.
