= Haydar Pasha Mosque =

Mosque in North Nicosia, Northern Cyprus

- Χαϊντάρ-πασά τζαμί
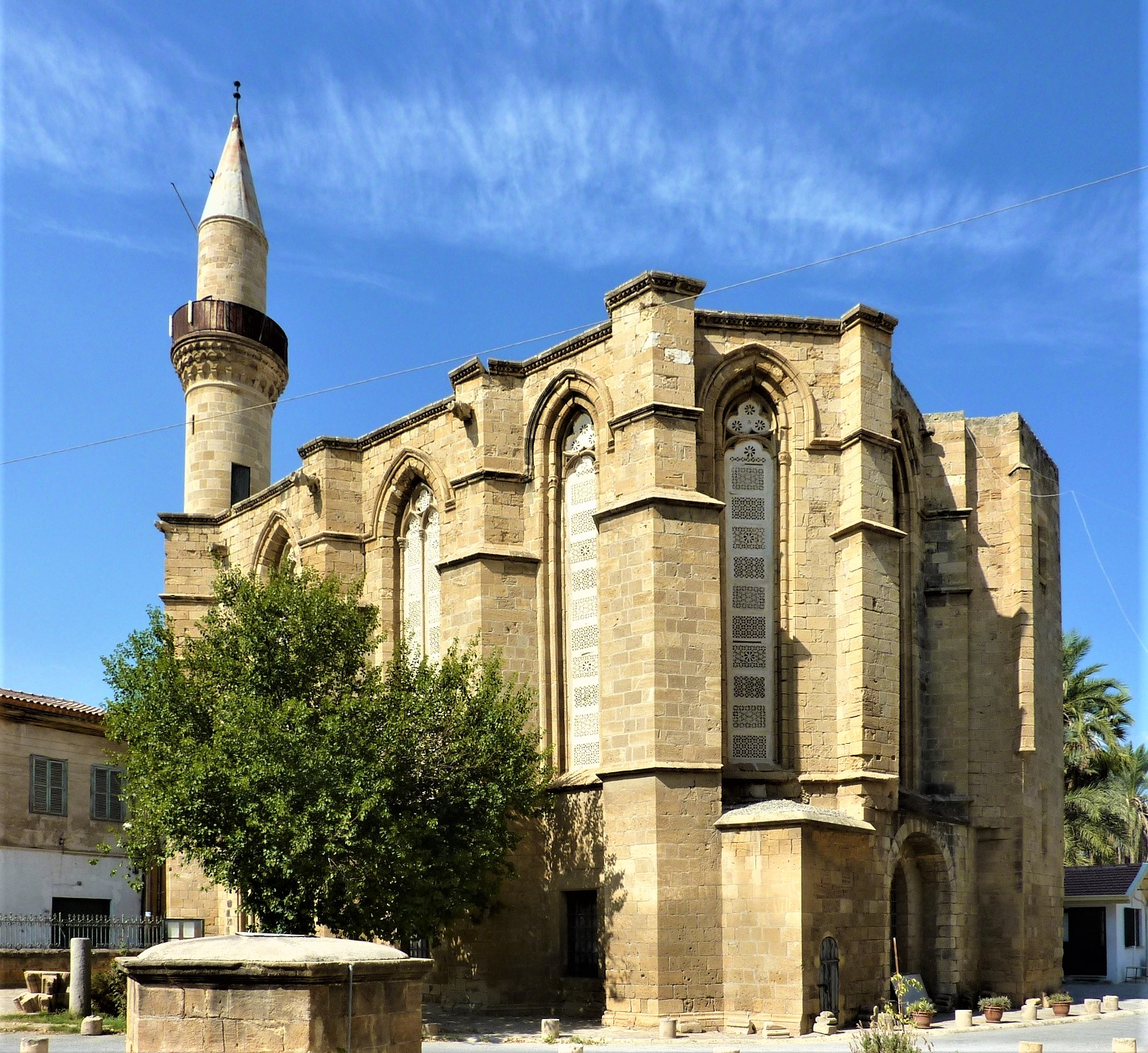

Religion
- Affiliation: Islam
- Branch/tradition: Sunni

Location
- Location: North Nicosia, Cyprus
- Interactive map of Haydar Pasha Mosque
- Coordinates: 35.1775°N 33.3661°E

Architecture
- Type: Mosque
- Established: 14th century

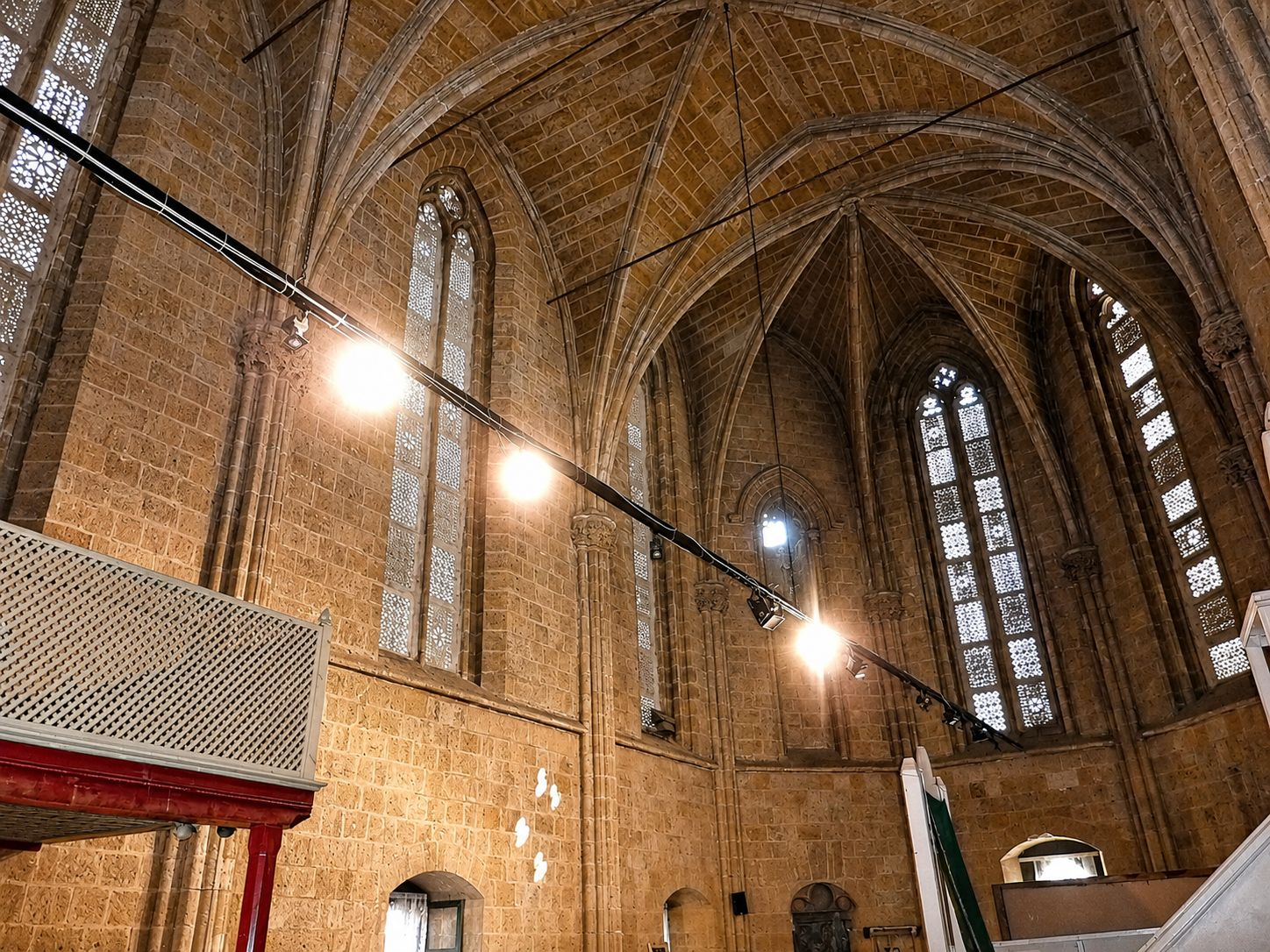
Interior

Haydar Pasha Mosque (Greek: Χαϊντάρ-πασά τζαμί Chaintár-pasa Tzamí, Turkish: Haydarpaşa Camii), formerly St. Catherine's Church, is a historic mosque in North Nicosia. It is the most important Gothic building in Nicosia after Ayia Sophia, formerly the Frankish (Latin) cathedral of Nicosia. It has been described by Harry Charles Luke as representing one of the finest examples of Gothic building on the island.

== History ==
The building was constructed in the 14th century, during the Frankish rule of the island, and named St. Catherine's Church. Upon the conquest of Nicosia by the Ottomans in 1570, it was converted to a mosque. It was also historically called "Ağalar Camisi", meaning "the Mosque of the Lords", as it was frequented by the Turkish local aristocracy, who lived in its vicinity. It is located on the Kirlizade Street.

== Structure ==
On the right-hand side of the building, the spot where the tomb of St. Catherine is said to have been was still shown in the 19th century and the Greek Cypriots often come and lit their oil lamps there. The front portal is in a fine Gothic style, the arched cornice of which ends in a poppy-head. There is also a Catherine wheel over it. On the right side there is a minaret, the highest one of the old city after those of Ayia Sophia. There are two fine doorways. The west door has a marble lintel with a rose between two dragons repeated three times. The other more heavily built door is on the south side.

Adjoining the mosque on the left is a half ruined building, of which only a few Gothic arches remain. There is also a portal with ornaments and finials on the right. Three Gothic windows, two of which are divided by slender columns, occupy the space between the buttresses, which have gargoyles on the top. On the left of the Mosque there are similar buttresses, and a sort of square turret.

The interior was whitewashed and much damaged, but the whitewash was removed in the early 20th century and traces of painting can be seen on the walls. Two Gothic arches support the vault, consisting of simply crossed ribs. In the apse six ribs, resting on a clustered column, spring forth from the keystone. North of the apse is a sacristy the vaulting of which is supported by corbels with finely carved human heads. Above the sacristy is a lofty chamber, whose lower window looks onto the main church

Both the mihrab (indicating the direction of Mecca) and minbar (pulpit) are on the right in this mosque.

It now functions as an art gallery and was previously a marriage registration office.

The Islamic Adhan, however, is still frequently recited from the mosque's minaret. The mosque also still retains a functioning minbar and a mihrab.
