= Arab Ahmet, Nicosia =

Arab Ahmet
- Άραπ Άχμετ, Arab Ahmet
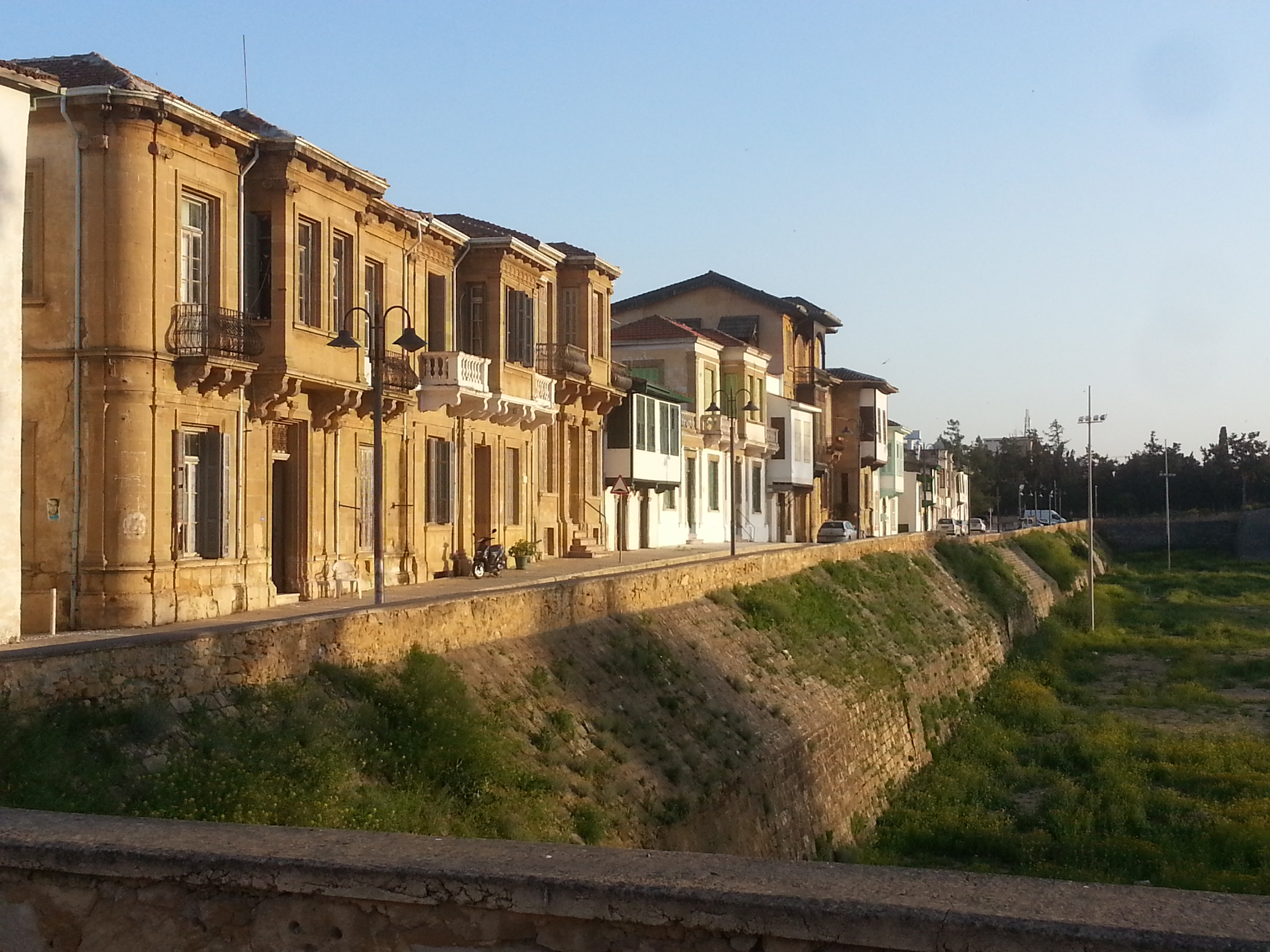
- Zahra Street along the city walls

- Location in Cyprus
- Coordinates: 35°10′38″N 33°21′28″E
- Country: Cyprus
  - District: Nicosia District Municipality

Population (2011)
  - Total: 3,550
- Time zone: UTC+2 (EET)
  - Summer (DST): UTC+3 (EEST)

Arab Ahmet is a neighbourhood, quarter, mahalla or parish of Nicosia, Cyprus and the mosque situated therein. Both the quarter and the mosque are named after Arab Ahmet Pasha, one of the Turkish commanders in the Ottoman conquest of Nicosia. It is spelled Arabahmet in Turkish and Άραπ Άχμετ in Greek.

At the last census (2011) it had a population of 3,550. It covers the historic Arab Ahmet neighbourhood in the west of Nicosia within the walls, plus an area west of that outside the walls up to the municipal boundary.

The population in 1946 was 2,617 (576 Greek, 846 Turkish, 1195 other - mostly Armenian, some Latin community). Together with the nearby Karamanzade Neighbourhood, it was part of the predominantly Armenian area of Nicosia.

The neighbourhood outside the walls, is now delimited by the Dept. of Lands and Surveys as follows: The boundary line passes from the point of the Quirini or Cephane (Jeb Khane) bastion to the roundabout just north of the bastion. Namely, the roundabout at the corner of the former site of the Turkish Cemetery, now the site of the Turkish Embassy in Cyprus. From there the boundary continues along Bedrettin Demirel Avenue (Hilarion Avenue) for about a mile to the old municipal boundary. The boundary is then coterminous with the municipal border in a south-westerly direction until the vicinity of the Central Prison. From here the boundary passes south of the prison due east, via Norman St., thence along Dereboyu Avenue and Markos Drakos Ave. until the point of the Roccas bastion. This area includes the Ledra Palace Hotel, British High Commission, Central Prison and the Turkish Cypriot Assembly of the Republic. Parts of the neighbourhood outside the walls in the north have been detached from the Arab Ahmet neighbourhood and are now considered parts of Köşklüçiftlik.

== History ==
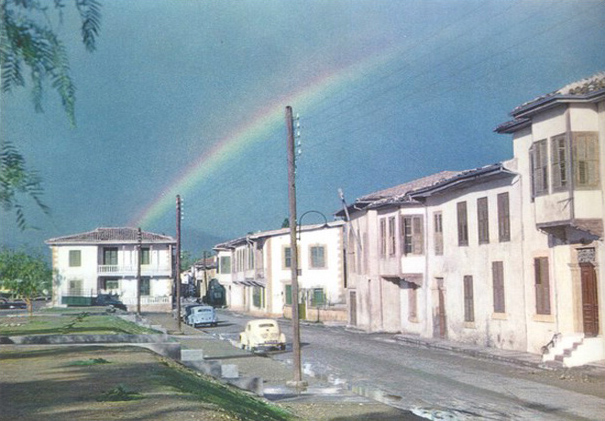
Tanzimat Street, which runs through the neighbourhood parallel with and inside the walls (c. 1950)

Arab Ahmet was one of the original 12 quarters as they existed shortly after the Ottoman conquest of Nicosia in 1570 and, like the others, was named after and put in charge of one of the commanders of the victorious army.

It is one of the later 24 historic quarters or neighbourhoods of Nicosia within the walls. In 1923 it was extended to encompass an extensive area outside the walls, linked by the road just to the north of the Mula (Zahra) bastion. According to the 1923 boundary extension beyond the walls, the northern boundary (with Ibrahim Pasha Quarter) was formed by a straight line from the salient of the Quirini/Cephane bastion, to the south-west comer of the Turkish Cemetery. The southern boundary (with Tophane Quarter - renamed Ayios Andreas in September 1945) ran west from the "new" entrance, Paphos Gate, along the Bridge Road, across the Pediaios Potamos Bridge and along the Central Prison Road until it meets the town boundary. (Subsequent adjustment placed the southern boundary slightly north of this.)

The eponymous mosque was founded in the early 18th century.

Arab Ahmet neighbourhood was the most prestigious residential area of Nicosia, where the high-ranking Turkish officials and the kadis and pashas had their homes. Due to its proximity to the old Ottoman Saray (previously Lusignan Palace), the commute for high-ranking officials to go was carried on foot. The neighbourhood was also cool in the evening during the summer because of the evening breeze coming from the west, from the direction of the Morphou Bay into the Mesaoria plain.

Armenian Cypriots had been concentrated in the area since the Ottoman conquest, though they were a minority in the area until the 1920s. Many other Armenians, who escaped from the massacres in Anatolia, settled in the Arab Ahmet neighbourhood and lived there until the inter-communal troubles of 1963, when they fled the quarter. Since most of the Armenians from Anatolia could speak Turkish, they preferred to live alongside Turkish Cypriots, using the same language. The Armenians were known as tradesmen and they were famous especially in the fields of jewellery, tailoring, photography and carpet selling.

At first, many Armenians leased Turkish properties. As they prospered in the area, they bought these properties from Turkish Cypriots, who preferred to either leave the island for Turkey or move to the new Köşklüçiftlik quarter outside the walls. By the 1950s, only 5-10 Turkish families living in ancestral mansions had remained in the area. The area was a vibrant part of the city in this period, Victoria Street (today known as Salahi Şevket Street) became a centre of culture and business. Haşmet Muzaffer Gürkan described the area in the 1940s as one where "sounds of piano could be heard any time of the day from the houses".

== Landmarks ==
=== Arab Ahmet Mosque ===
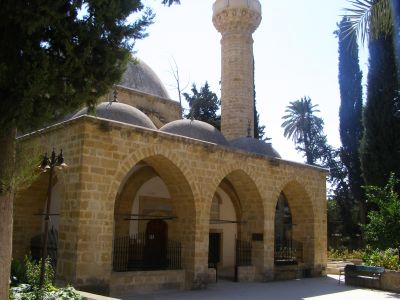
Arab Ahmet Mosque

Arab Ahmet Mosque is situated in the western Arab Ahmet Quarter of Nicosia, the capital of Cyprus. It was built in the late 16th century in classical Ottoman architectural style. It is famous both for its beautiful Turkish architectural style and for the graves of important people in its courtyard. It was built in the early 18th century in memory of Arab Ahmet Pasha, one of the Turkish commanders during the conquest of Cyprus. In 1845, it was renovated due to the great amount of renovations it needed. It is the only mosque in Cyprus to exhibit typical Turkish domes. It is rectangular and a large central dome covers its main body. Three smaller domes cover the entrance, and four more cover corners of the mosque.

=== Arab Ahmet aqueduct ===
This aqueduct, known as Arab Ahmet Su, was one of the two main sources of water supply in 19th-century Nicosia. It is named after Ahmed Pasha (not the neighbourhood), who seems to have rebuilt or repaired it as the principal water-conduit which supplied the town from the upper reaches of the river Pediaios. From there the aqueduct approached the city from the south-west bringing water into the city via Paphos Gate, near Arab Ahmet.

=== Ledra Palace Hotel ===
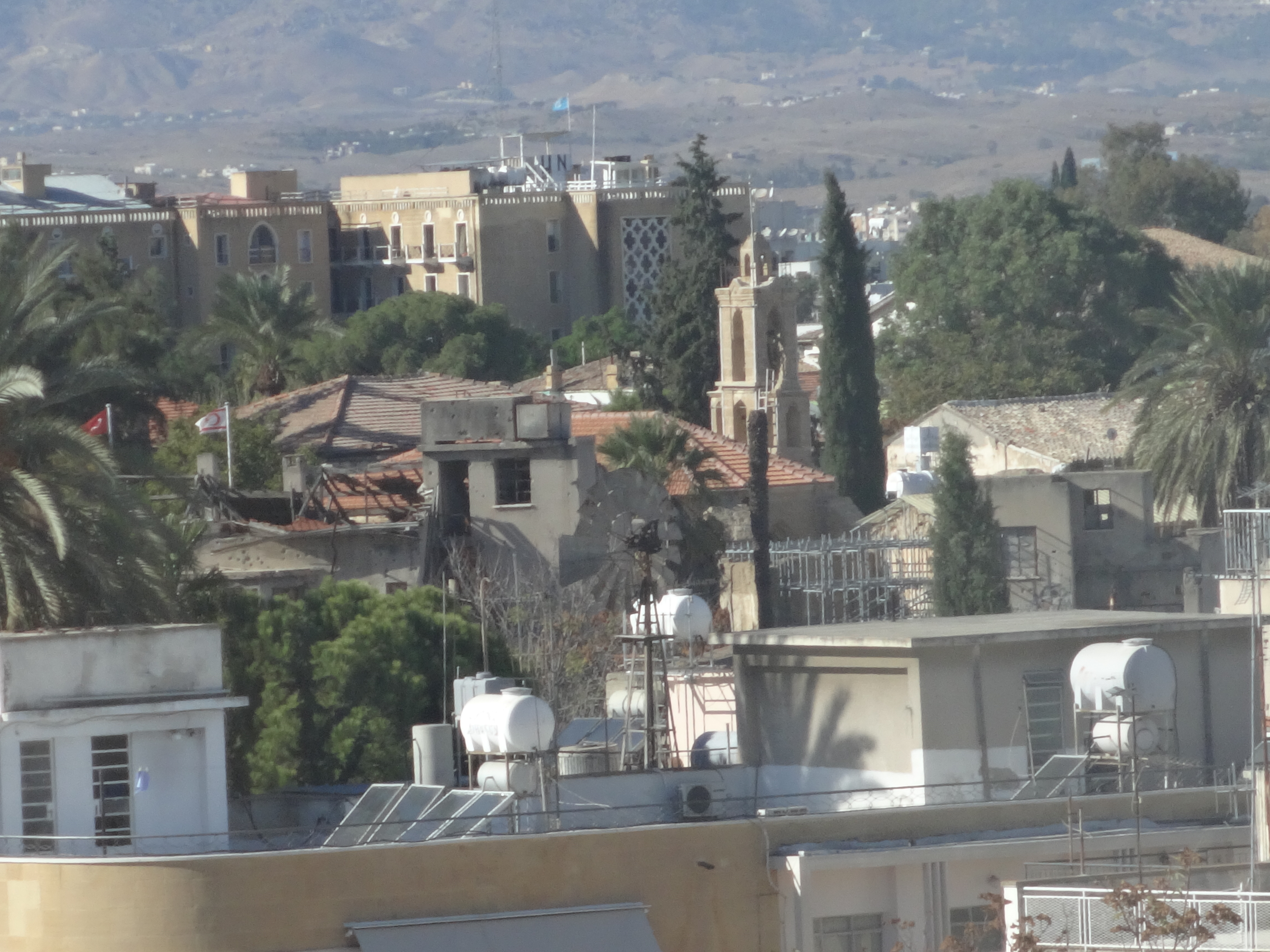
View of the neighbourhood of Arab Ahmet. Ledra Palace Hotel in background; Armenian Church (Karamanzade neighbourhood) in the foreground. Arab Ahmed Mosque located in wooded area right of the tower of that church.

The Ledra Palace Hotel was until 1974 one of the largest and most glamorous hotels of Nicosia. The hotel was designed by the German Jewish architect Benjamin Günsberg and was built between 1947 and 1949 on what was then called King Edward VII Street in the quarter (enoria) of Arab Ahmet. This part of the road is now named Markos Drakos Avenue (since 1960) and another part is named Selim II Avenue.

Following the Turkish invasion of Cyprus it fell within the boundaries of the UN Buffer Zone and now serves as the headquarters for Sector 2 United Nations Roulement Regiment (URR) part of UNFICYP. The Ledra Palace Hotel has played host to many high level meetings between Greek Cypriot and Turkish Cypriot leaders, as well as hundreds of structured conflict resolution workshops between Greek Cypriot and Turkish Cypriot peace builders.

=== Central Prison of Nicosia ===
The Central Prison of Nicosia is the only correctional facility in Cyprus. It is located in the west of the neighbourhood, south of the Green Line and was built by the British in 1894. It was used, until 1955, both as place of temporary detention of persons under judicial decree as well as a place of detention of those condemned by the courts to imprisonment.

== Current division ==
The southern fringe of the neighbourhood outside the walls, around the Ledra Palace Hotel, is under the control of the Cyprus government or the United Nations. The Arab Ahmet Neighbourhood of Nicosia Turkish Municipality only covers that part within the walls, while the area beyond the walls is organised as the separate Neighbourhood of Köşklüçiftlik (old name Keushk Chiftlik) This position is summarised below.

Area	Population 2011
Arab Ahmet within walls	561
Köşklüçiftlik	2,939
Arab Ahmet (Cyprus gov. sector)	50
Total	3,550

The neighbourhood in the north within the city walls is now mostly inhabited by Turkish settlers. Many buildings are in a state of disrepair due to the poor financial condition of the inhabitants.
