= Köşklüçiftlik =

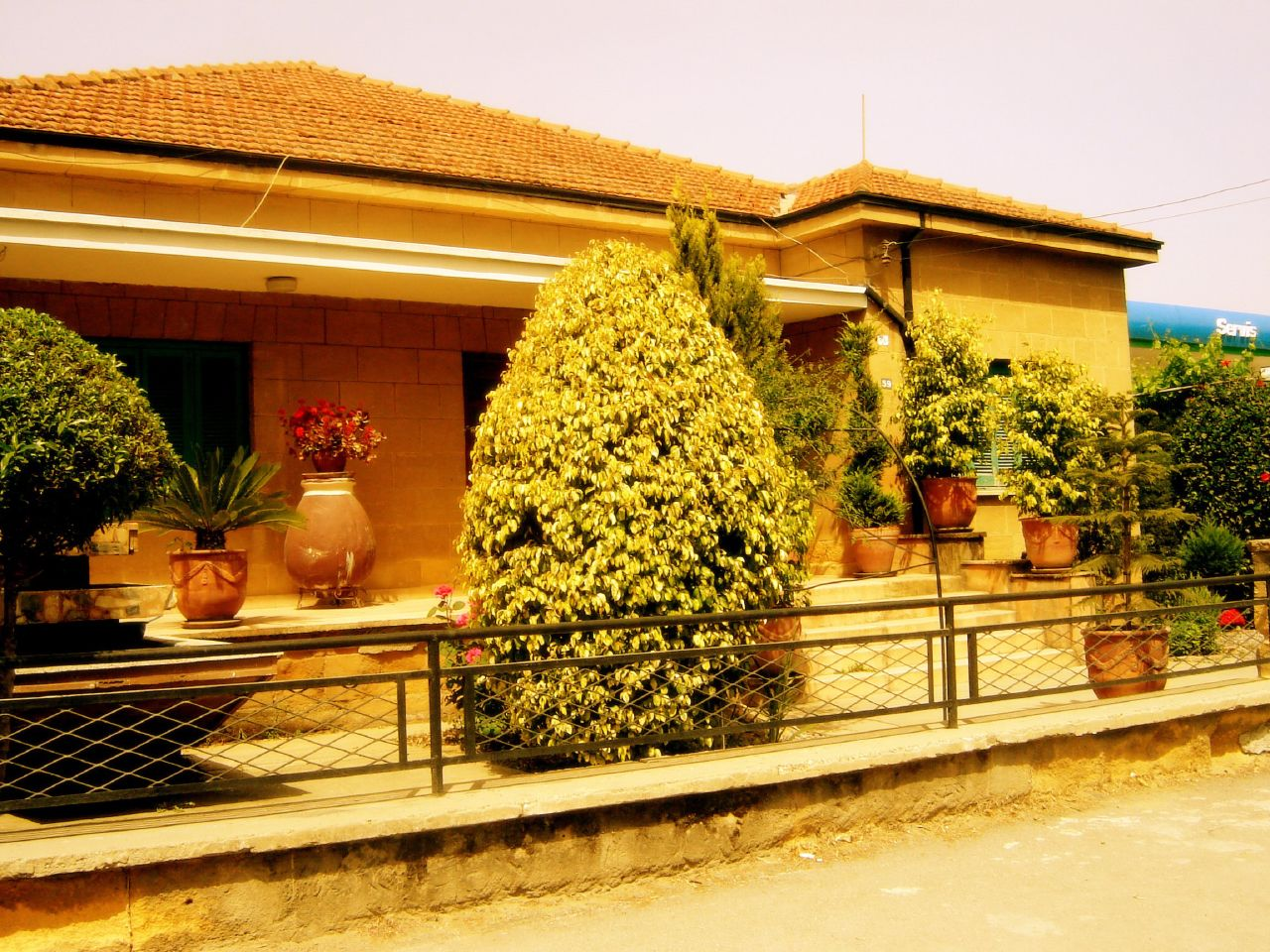
- View of a classical house in the neighbourhood

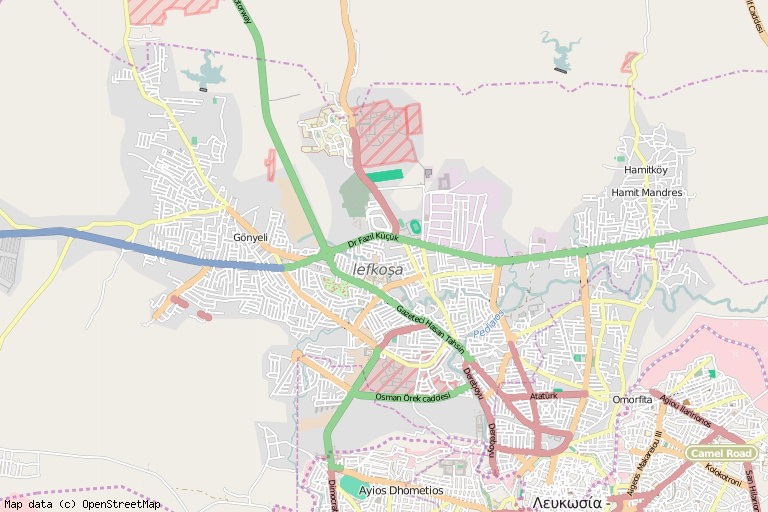
- A point from Köşklüçiftlik, location in North Nicosia
- Coordinates: 35°10′59″N 33°21′20″E
- Country: Cyprus
  - District: Nicosia District
- Country (controlled by): Northern Cyprus
  - District: Lefkoşa District
  - Municipality: Nicosia Turkish Municipality

Government
  - Muhtar: Hüseyin Ergök

Population (2011)
  - Total: 2,939

Köşklüçiftlik is a quarter of North Nicosia in Northern Cyprus. In 2011, it had a population of 2,939. The name of the neighbourhood comes from Turkish and means "the farm with a manor".

The neighbourhood, alongside Ayios Andreas, possesses one of the highest concentration of neoclassical and modernist historical mansions in Nicosia.

== Cityscape ==
It is bordered by the Pedieos River in the west, the Kumsal Park separating it from Kumsal in the north, the Green Line in the south, the city walls and the Bedrettin Demirel Avenue, separating it from Yenişehir in the east. It is home to a part of the Dereboyu region, the center of business and entertainment in North Nicosia, along with Kumsal, and is home to a number of cafes, restaurants, banks and shops. It hosts the Turkish Cypriot Assembly of the Republic, the legislative body of Northern Cyprus and the Central Bank of Northern Cyprus. The Ledra Palace checkpoint is also in the quarter. A new park was unveiled in the quarter in 2014 by the Nicosia Turkish Municipality.

== History ==
Its old name was Tabakhane or "Tabana", meaning "tannery", which originated from the relocation of the old traditional tannery to the area in the 1890s by the British administration. The tannery was located at the site of the current site of the plantation of the Department of Forestry.

The quarter was one of the first residential areas built around the walled city of Nicosia. Before residential development, it was a farm (hence the name "the farm with a manor"), and the manor was located near the present-day Ledra Palace checkpoint. The area reportedly belonged to the Turkish Cypriot merchant Mustafa Efendi in the 19th century, with his estate extending as far as Ortaköy and Omorfita. The first residential development occurred in the 1910s. From 1930 onwards, the area saw significant development and began to be populated by Turkish and Armenian Cypriots. The population of the Tabakhane quarter was recorded as 757 in 1946, but this figure is not the total population of Köşklüçiftlik at the time as some of it was incorporated in the Arabahmet neighborhood and some of Tabakhane was located within the walled city. Large and imposing houses were built in the area; these houses, mainly built of ashlar, still characterize the quarter and are present in every street. In the 1950s, the tannery was moved to another area by the colonial government as the quarter had grown by this time to incorporate this area. By the 1960s, it was considered a diverse neighborhood with coexisting Armenian, Greek and Turkish Cypriot populations, but the Armenian and Greek Cypriots fled following the beginnings of the Cypriot intercommunal violence in 1958. The houses were then purchased by Turkish Cypriots.

In early 1960s, Köşklüçiftlik, along with the neighboring Kumsal, were placed under the jurisdiction of the Nicosia Turkish Municipality. The quarter was the most rapidly developing area of Nicosia in the early 1960s, when other quarters such as Yenişehir were inhabited by Greek Cypriots and others such as Göçmenköy did not exist. According to municipal statistics, 46 houses were built in the 1962-63 period, with most of these having two floors. With its well-planned and elegant houses, the quarter was looked up to as a symbol of well-being and a center of the Turkish Cypriot bourgeoisie and upper classes. Due to Köşklüçiftlik having the highest levels of welfare at the time, the phrase "Köşklüçiftlik çocuğu" (Turkish for "Köşklüçiftlik kid") came to mean "spoilt" or "leading a life of luxury".

After the intercommunal conflict of 1963, Köşklüçiftlik remained under Turkish Cypriot administration. For some time, development in the quarter stopped, with no buildings being built between 1964 and 1967. This was followed by a period of intensive building, when the internally displaced Turkish Cypriots were resettled at the area in the 52 houses that were built between 1968 and 1972, providing accommodation to 154 households. With this development, Köşklüçiftlik merged with the quarter of Kumsal.

== Culture ==
The quarter is home to the Şehit Tuncer Primary School. It hosts cultural activities, along with the festivities in Dereboyu, and a cultural center.

== Economy ==
In 2013, an average plot of land without any further construction was reported to cost around 150,000 British pounds in the area, considered a high and unaffordable value for Northern Cyprus. In 1997, the quarter was reported to be the most expensive area in North Nicosia, with a meter square of land costing 120 US dollars, and an average plot of land costing $62,400. The prices had jumped to $720 per square meter in 2010, with an average plot of land costing $375,000.

== Gallery ==
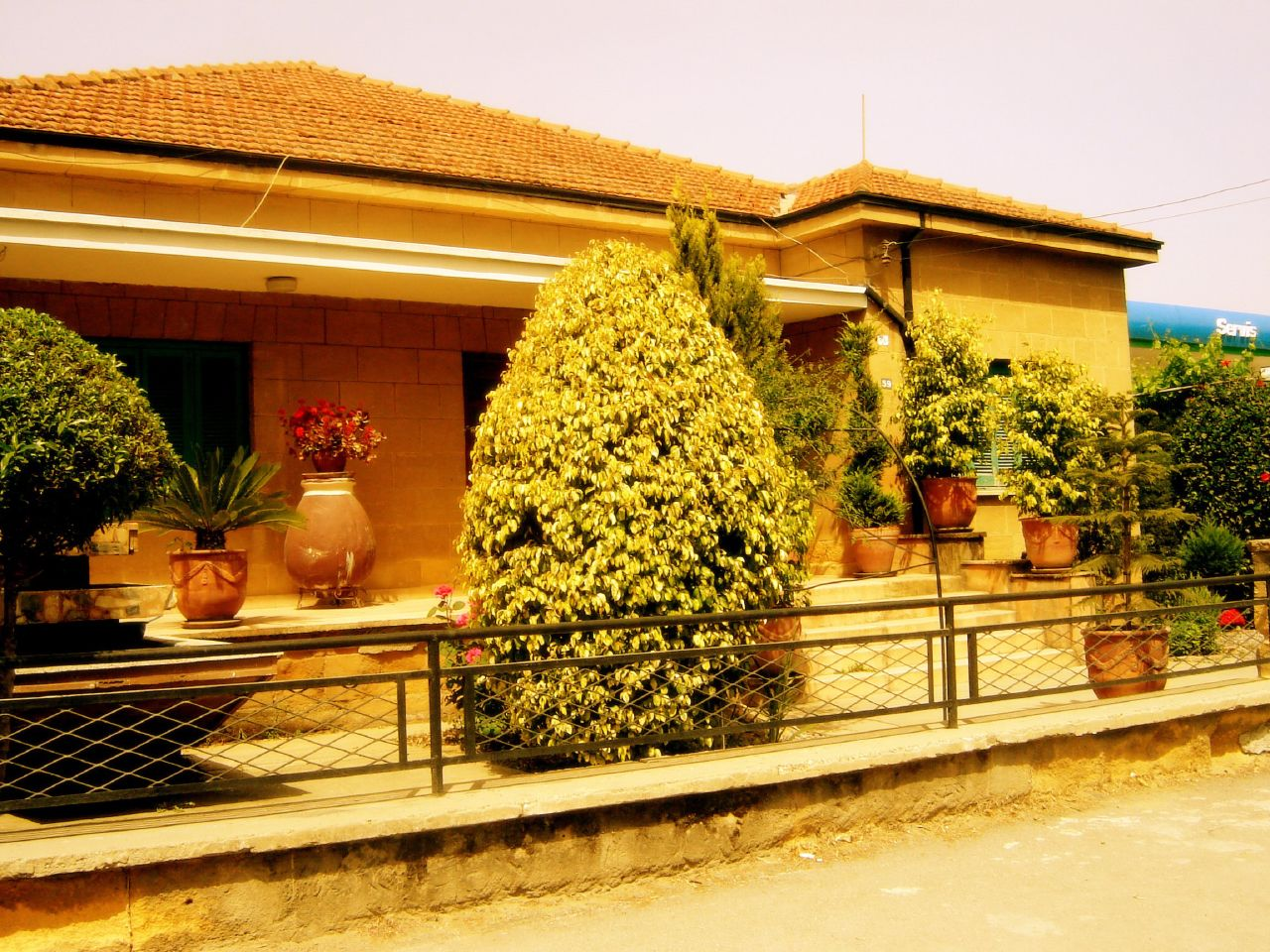
A classical house in Köşklüçiftlik

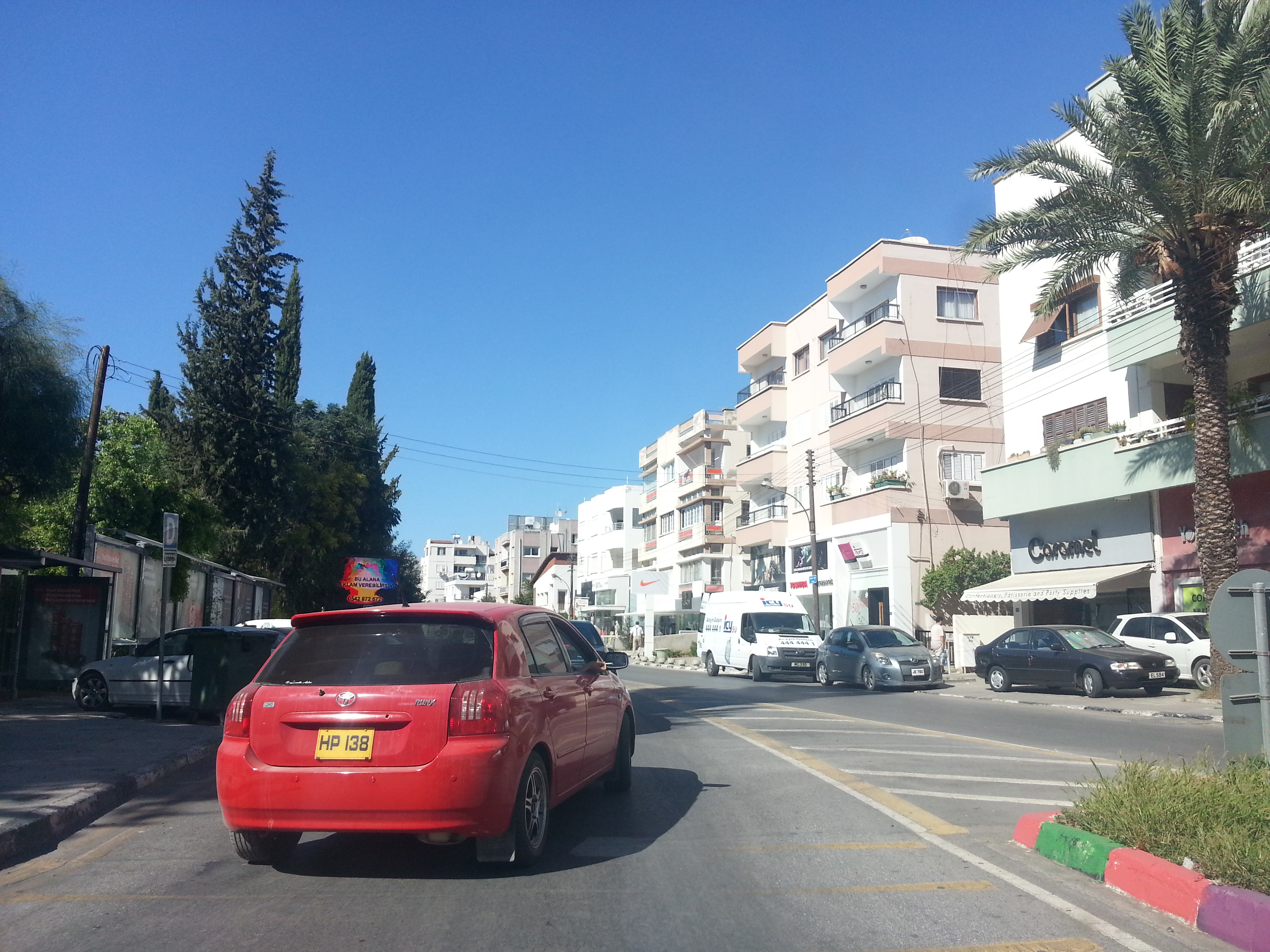
Dereboyu

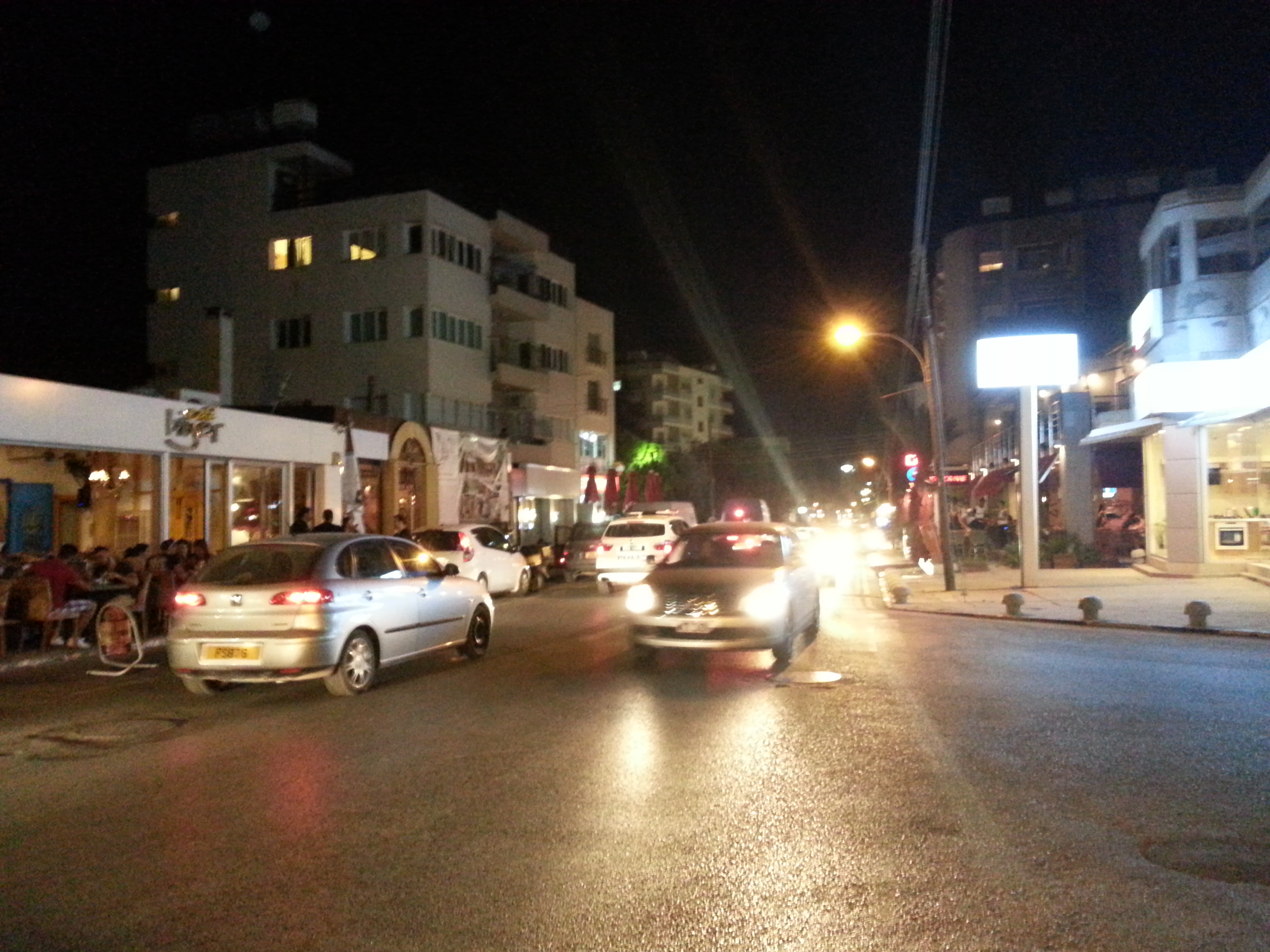
Dereboyu at night

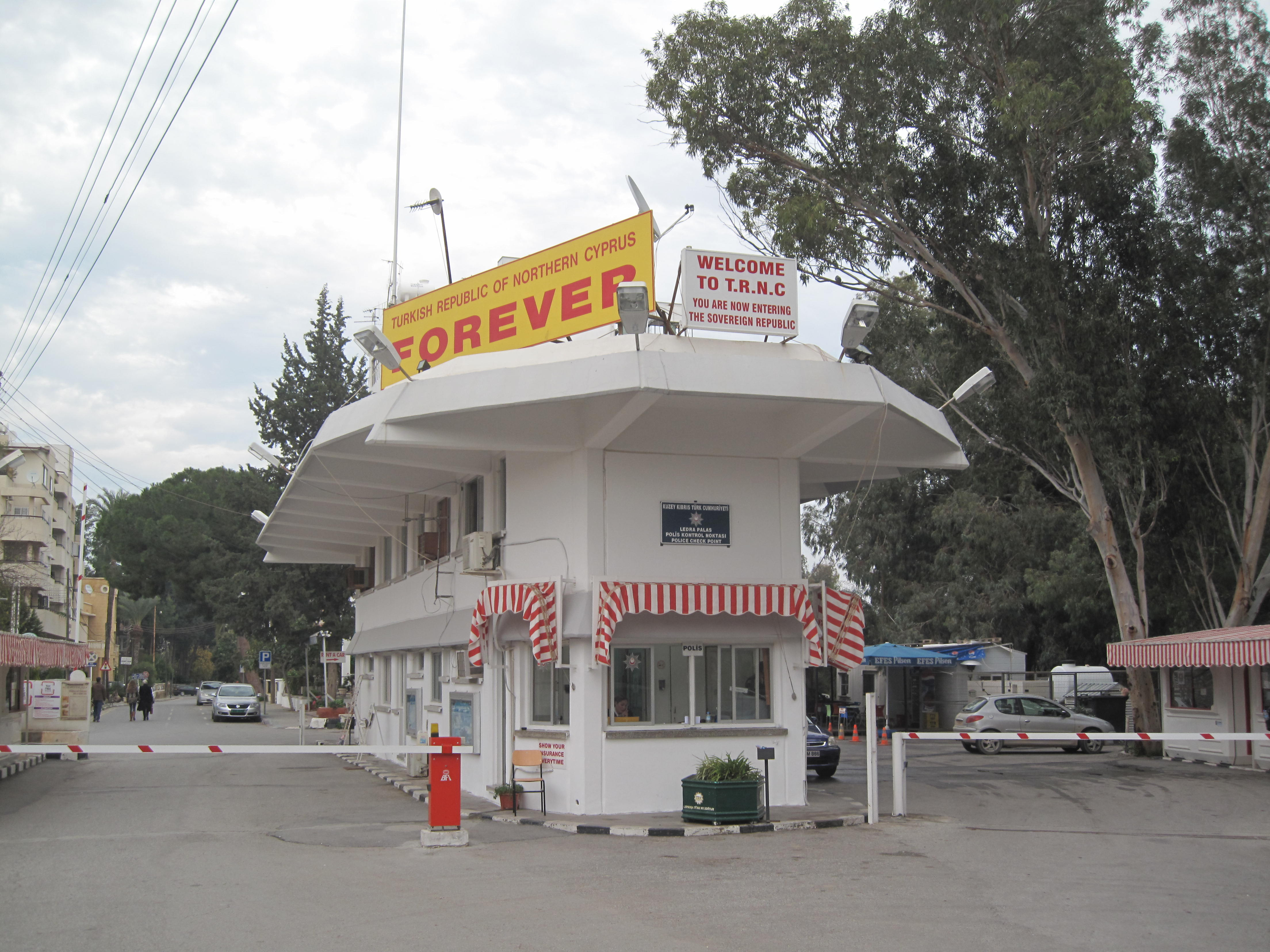
Ledra Palace checkpoint

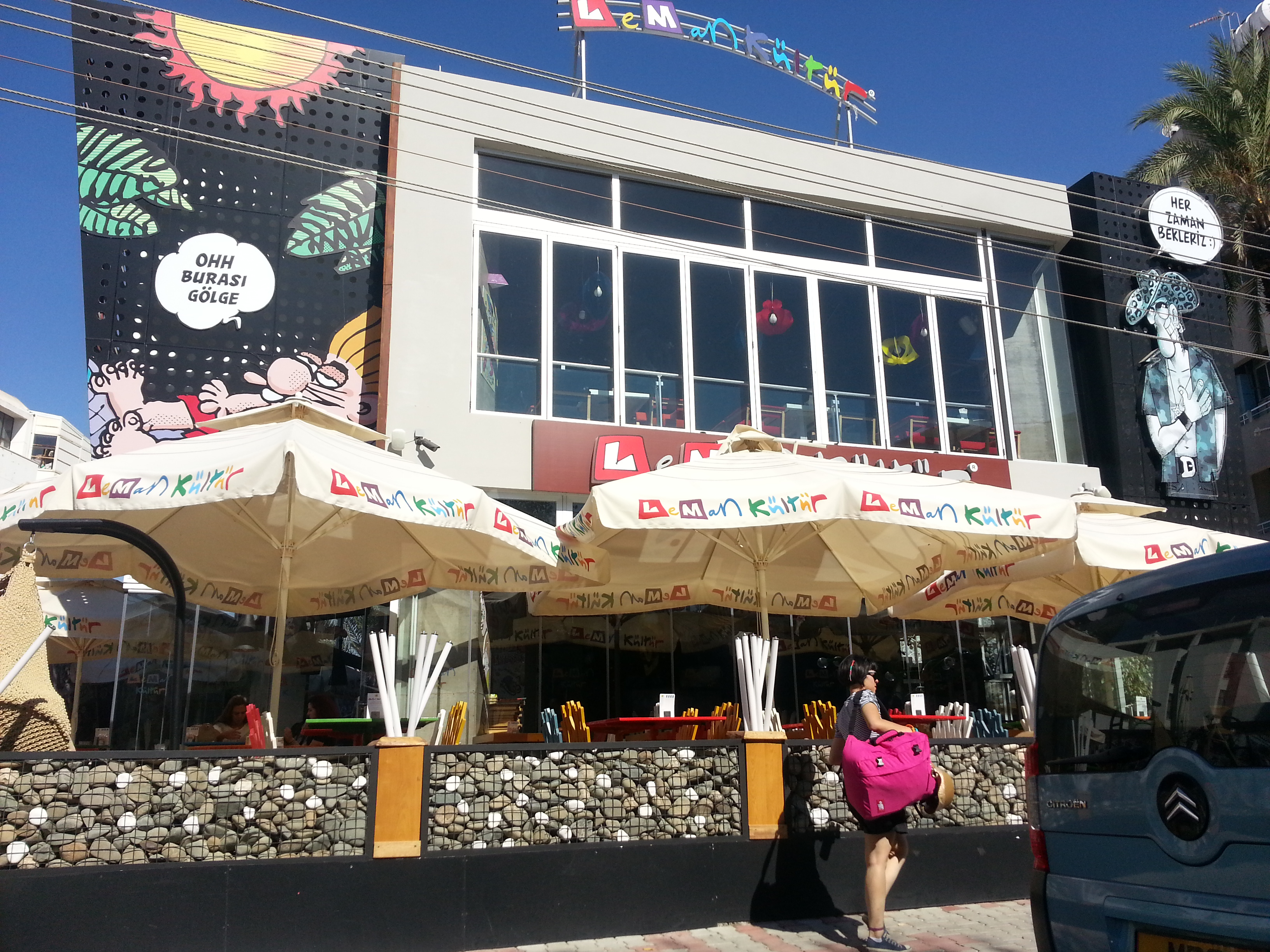
Restaurant in Dereboyu, Köşklüçiftlik

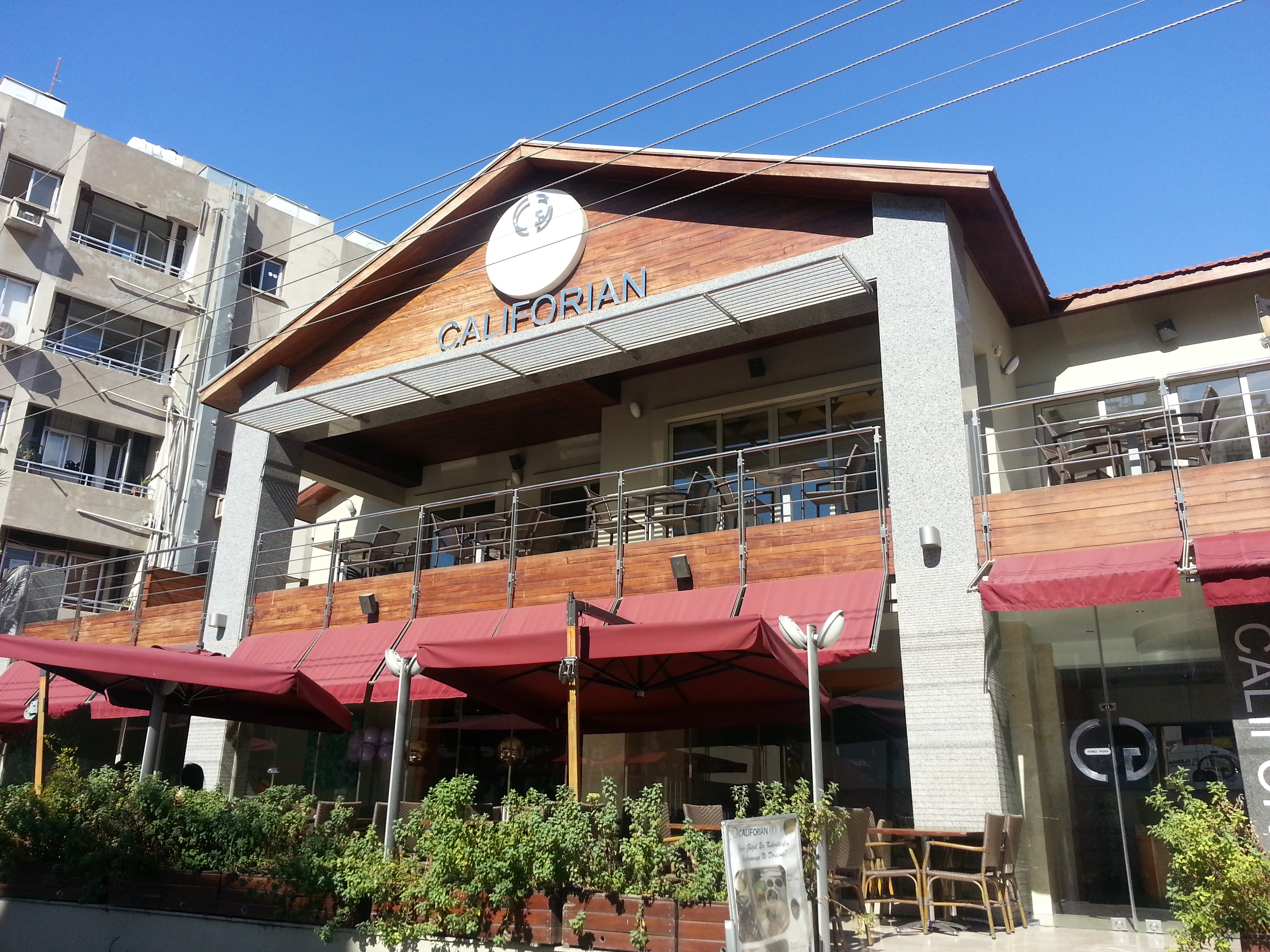
Restaurant in Dereboyu, Köşklüçiftlik

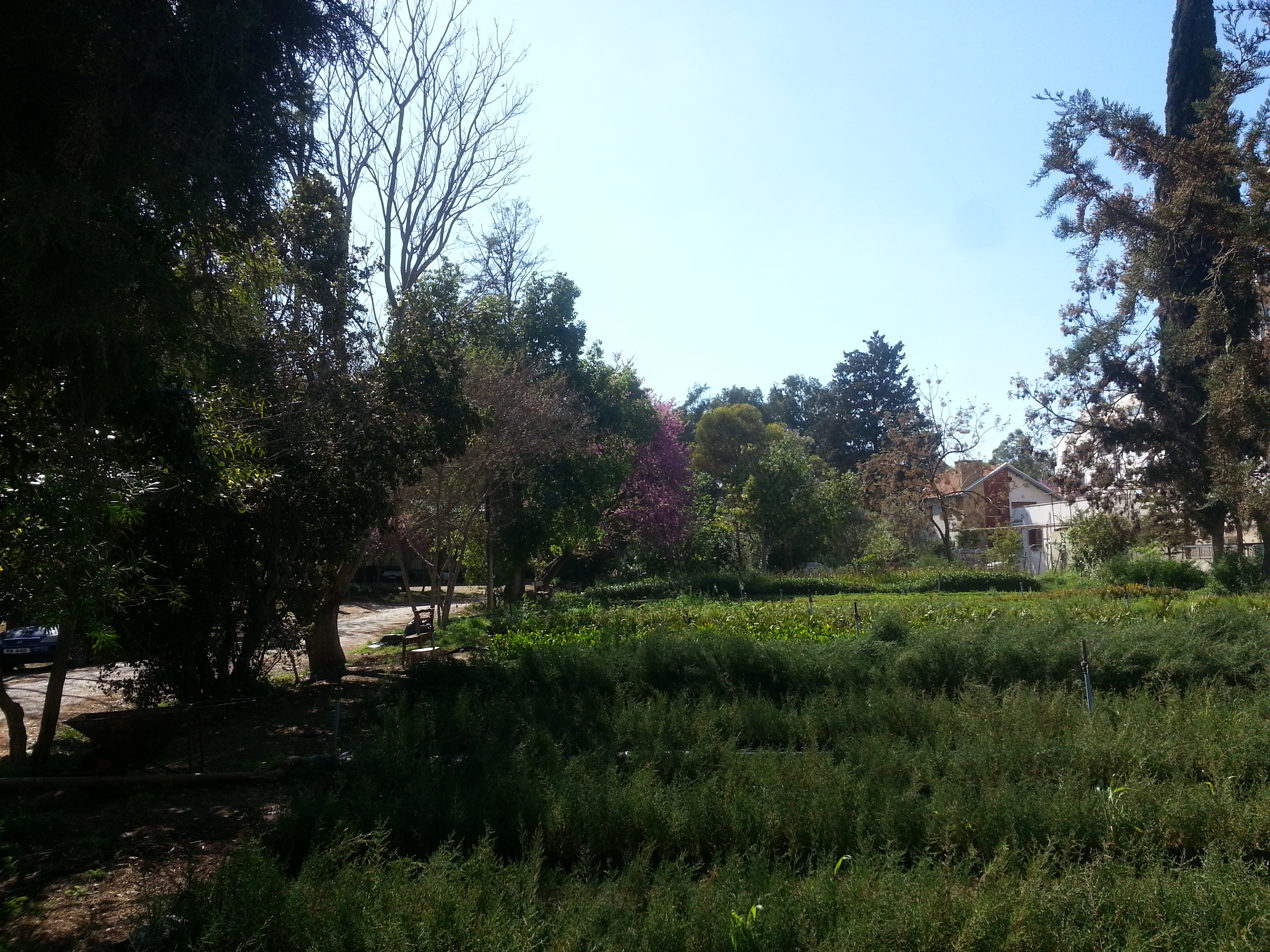
Plantation of the Department of Forestry in Dereboyu, Köşklüçiftlik
