= Charitable Association of the Turkish Women of Nicosia =

The Charitable Association of the Turkish Women of Nicosia (Turkish: Lefkoşa Türk Hanımları Cemiyet-i Hayriyesi), shortened in some sources as Nicosia Women's Association (Turkish: Lefkoşa Hanımlar Cemiyeti), was the first women's organisation in the Turkish Cypriot community. The association was founded in Nicosia in 1931 under the leadership of activist Ulviye Mithat.

== Background ==
Prior to the foundation of the association, the conservative nature of the Turkish Cypriot society and the social exclusion of women had been changing with the effects of the graduates of the Victoria School for Girls, opened in 1902, who were employed as teachers across the island. The social participation of Turkish Cypriot women were, however, still much more reserved than their Greek Cypriot counterparts, who had numerous women's associations that facilitated a public debate on the issues of Cypriot women. Atatürk's reforms in Turkey and their emphasis on the participation of women in public life also had an effect via the following of a new generation of progressive, Kemalist intellectuals, and women had started singing nationalist anthems at public gatherings. Furthermore, in 1929, the Association for the Protection of Children (Turkish: Himaye-i Etfal Cemiyeti), established with the efforts of the Turkish consul, became the first Turkish Cypriot association to grant women membership. It was during this period that Ulviye Mithat, an educated Kemalist woman from Turkey, married Turkish Cypriot lawyer Mithat Bey and moved to Cyprus.

== Establishment ==
The association was established on 25 December 1931 with the acceptance of its constitution in its first meeting in Ulviye Mithat's house in Köşklüçiftlik. The founding president was Ulviye Mithat and other founders were teachers in Nicosia. Şaziye Nevres, a pre-school teacher and the accountant of the association, stated later in an interview that Ulviye Mithat had become friends with Cypriot teachers after coming from Istanbul, and was struck by the abundance of poor children in the capital, which motivated her to organize other women to establish a charitable association.

The association aimed to help poor women in children, and to raise the socioeconomic standards of women in particular and society in general. As such, it aimed to organize donations and fundraisers, as well as educating women to enable them to be economically productive. The constitution was inspired by the constitution of the Turkish Philanthropists' Association (Turkish: Türkiye Yardım Sevenler Derneği), a women's association in Turkey.

== Activities ==
The association organised daily free lunches for children in a building they rented. They also organised donations of clothing to poor children. As the colonial administration had no social welfare system at the time, they organised for children of poor families to be taken care of by wealthier families. Two months after its foundation, the association established a "house of compassion" (Turkish: şefkat yurdu). The establishment aimed to provide education to women of lower social status, free of charge, that would allow them to develop economical valuable skills. As such, it encompassed a sewing workshop employing 20 women, where voluntary and paid instructors taught women how to sew. The cloth traders donated cloth and there was a demand by the public for the products. The products were sold at the Friday Market. In nationalist spirit, the association encouraged the consumption of Turkish Cypriot products by Turkish Cypriots. The house also provided accommodation for some of the women.

The association also organised several shows to raise funds for children. These shows incorporated plays by girls at primary schools, such as a 1932 show at Magic Palace that was supported by the Agia Sophia Girls' School. These shows introduced Turkish Cypriot women to public speaking.

The activities of the association were lauded in Turkish Cypriot newspapers by Kemalist male intellectuals and students studying in Turkey.

Due to the appointment of some of the members of the association outside Nicosia and due to some internal disagreements, the association was disbanded in 1935. Nevertheless, it had a lasting impact as the first institution where Turkish Cypriot women could exercise a right to vote, and the first institution that enabled women to play an active part in economic production and marketing. It also inspired the establishment of two other women's organisations in the 1930s. One was established in Lapithos in 1932. The other, the Institution of Helpful Mothers (Turkish: Yardımcı Analar Kurumu), was established in 1936 by former members of the Charitable Association of the Turkish Women of Nicosia to fill the void felt after the association's disbanding.
