= Zahra Street =

Street in Nicosia, Cyprus

- Zahra Sokak / Ζάχρα δρόμος
- Location: Nicosia, Cyprus
- Quarter: Arabahmet

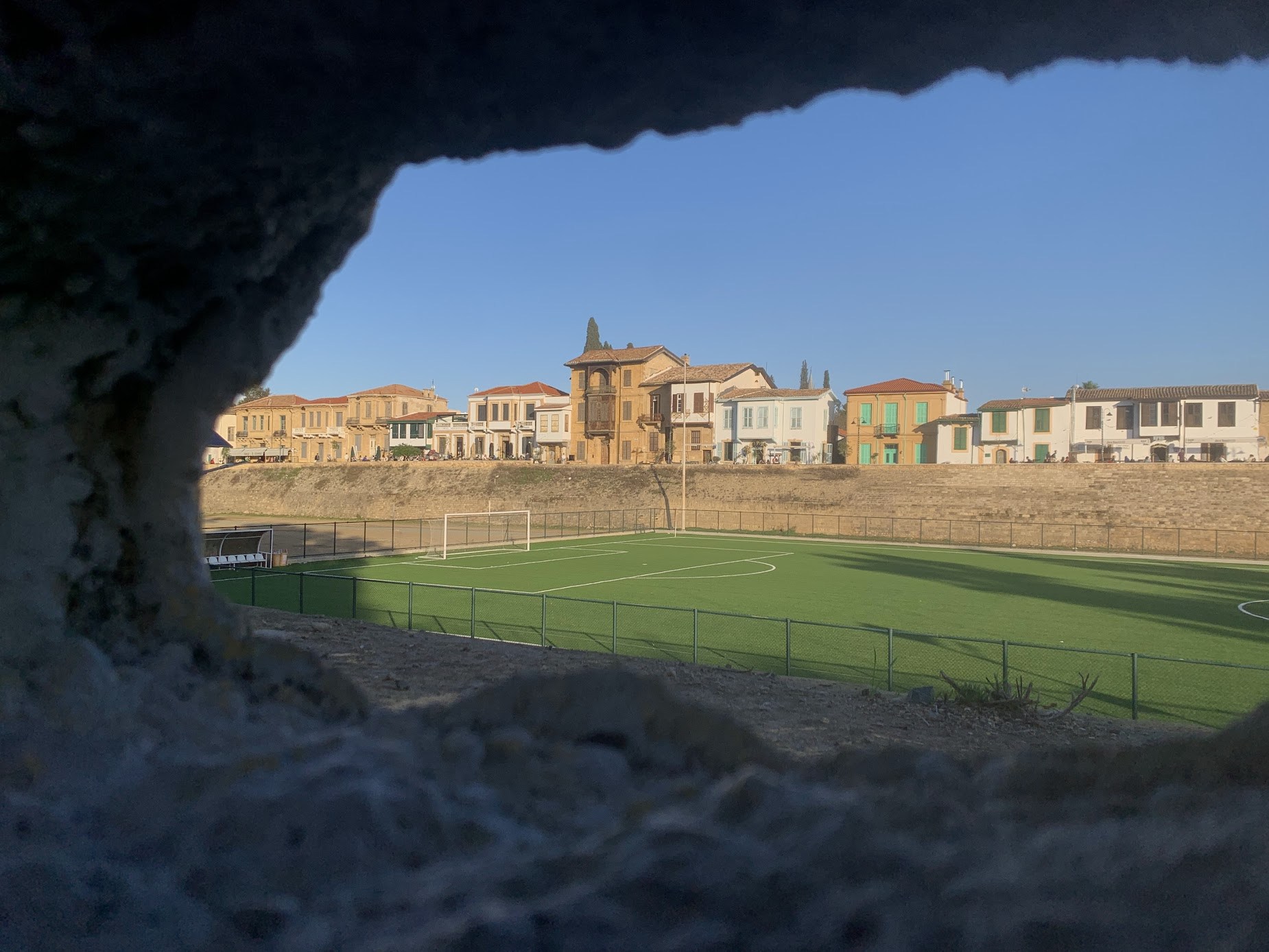
Zahra Street, Nicosia Walls and Çetinkaya football club training grounds as seen from inside the buffer zone

Zahra Street (Turkish: Zahra Sokak) (Greek: Οδός Ζάχρας) is a significant street in the Arabahmet neighbourhood in Nicosia, Cyprus. The street is located on the western edge of Nicosia’s walled city, adjacent to the United Nations Buffer Zone (Green Line) and overlooking the Ledra Palace Hotel. It runs between Mula (Zahra) bastion and Roccas Bastion (Yiğitler Burcu), latter of which forms one of the narrowest points between the two sides of the Green Line. The moat right underneath the street and subsequently the walls, lies inside the buffer zone, where currently a football pitch stands. The street is part of and de facto administered by Northern Cyprus. Zahra Street runs parallel to Tanzimat Street and Victoria Street.

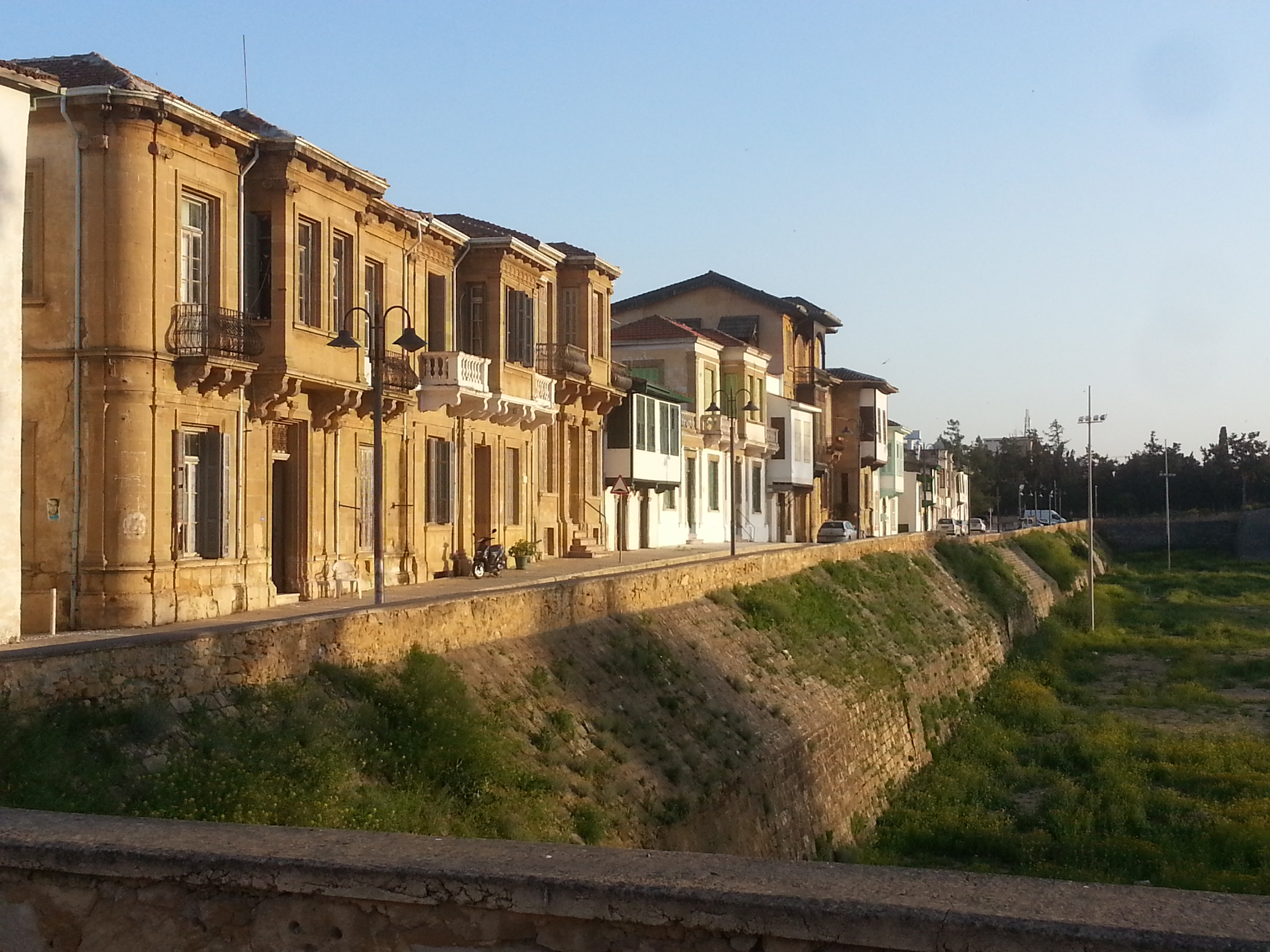
Zahra Street in 2015 before pedestrianisation

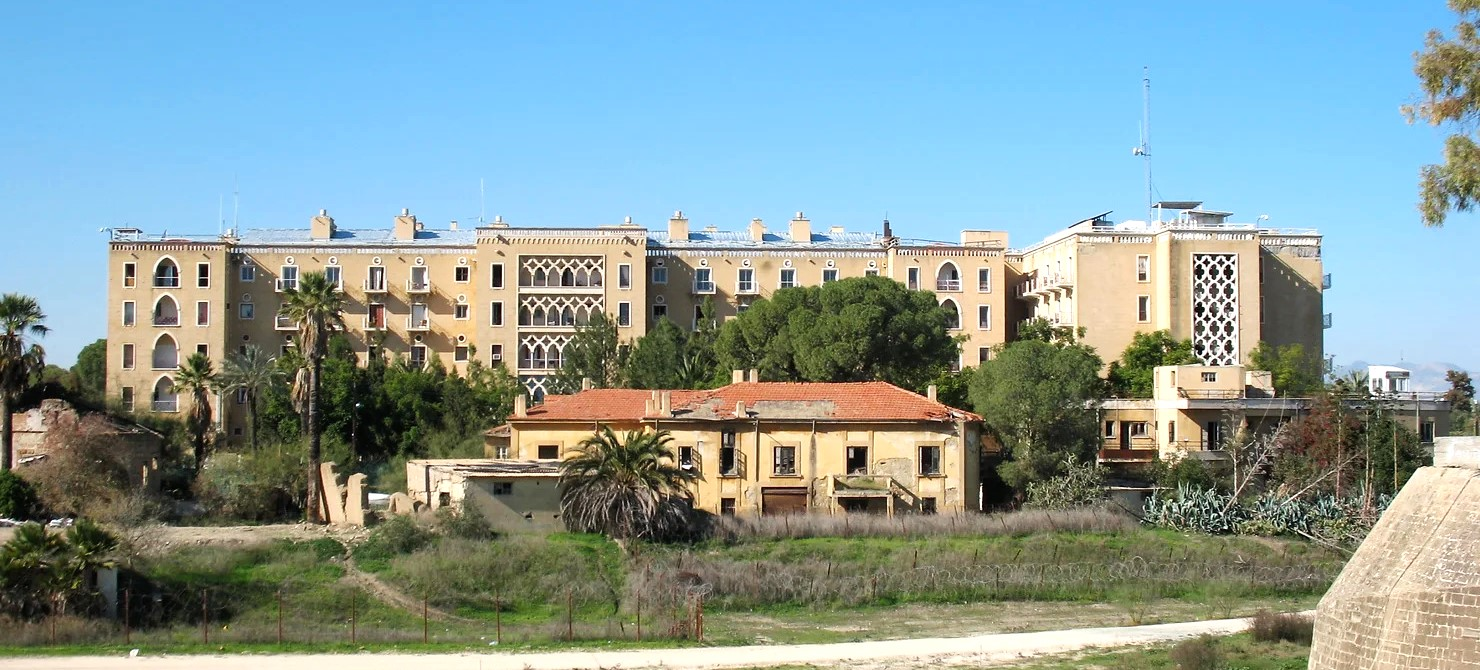
Ledra Palace Hotel as seen from Zahra Street

== History ==
The area developed during the Ottoman period as part of the Arabahmet neighbourhood, which was historically home to prominent Turkish Cypriot and Armenian Cypriot families. In the late 20th century, the street’s location beside the Green Line led to depopulation and decline.

It is characterised by having one of the highest clusters of historical houses in the old town. Like much of Arabahmet, Zahra Street is lined with predominantly two-storey buildings reflecting a blend of British and Ottoman-era residential designs. Many possess traditional elements such as timber framing, Ottoman bay windows (Cumba), and rear courtyards. These structures often blend local vernacular elements like eaves, arched doorways, and intimate building scales evoking a strong sense of historic ambiance.

The street overlooks the Ledra Palace Hotel and the training grounds of Çetinkaya Türk Football Club down by the moat, which lie inside the buffer zone. Historically the area of the moat was known as Taksim Square/Field (not be confused with Taksim Square in Istanbul), where military parades often took place during the British times. Taksim Square became one of the focal points of contact of Turkish Cypriots during intercommunal violence in late 1950s, where Turkish Cypriots were pursuing a policy of Taksim, the division of the island between Greece and Turkey, while Greek Cypriots were aiming for Enosis, union of Cyprus with Greece pursued by EOKA.

== Revitalisation ==
Zahra Street alongside the rest of the Arabahmet neighbourhood was one of the focal points of the Nicosia Master Plan’s rehabilitation efforts. Many heritage buildings were restored but conditions remained largely poor until the early 2010s. Along with the opening of the checkpoint at Ledra Street, the two sides of the walled city were reconnected once again. Nonetheless since the last decade, Nicosia walled city has seen a major increase in revitalisation efforts, where in Zahra Street most buildings were repurposed as cafes, bars and restaurants. A combination of factors such as the cluster of historical homes, and the concept of sitting right by the green line, has made Zahra Street a lively hotspot for the locals. As the economic vitality of the area increased, the street now frequently hosts many concerts and festivals.

The street was pedestrianised in September 2022.

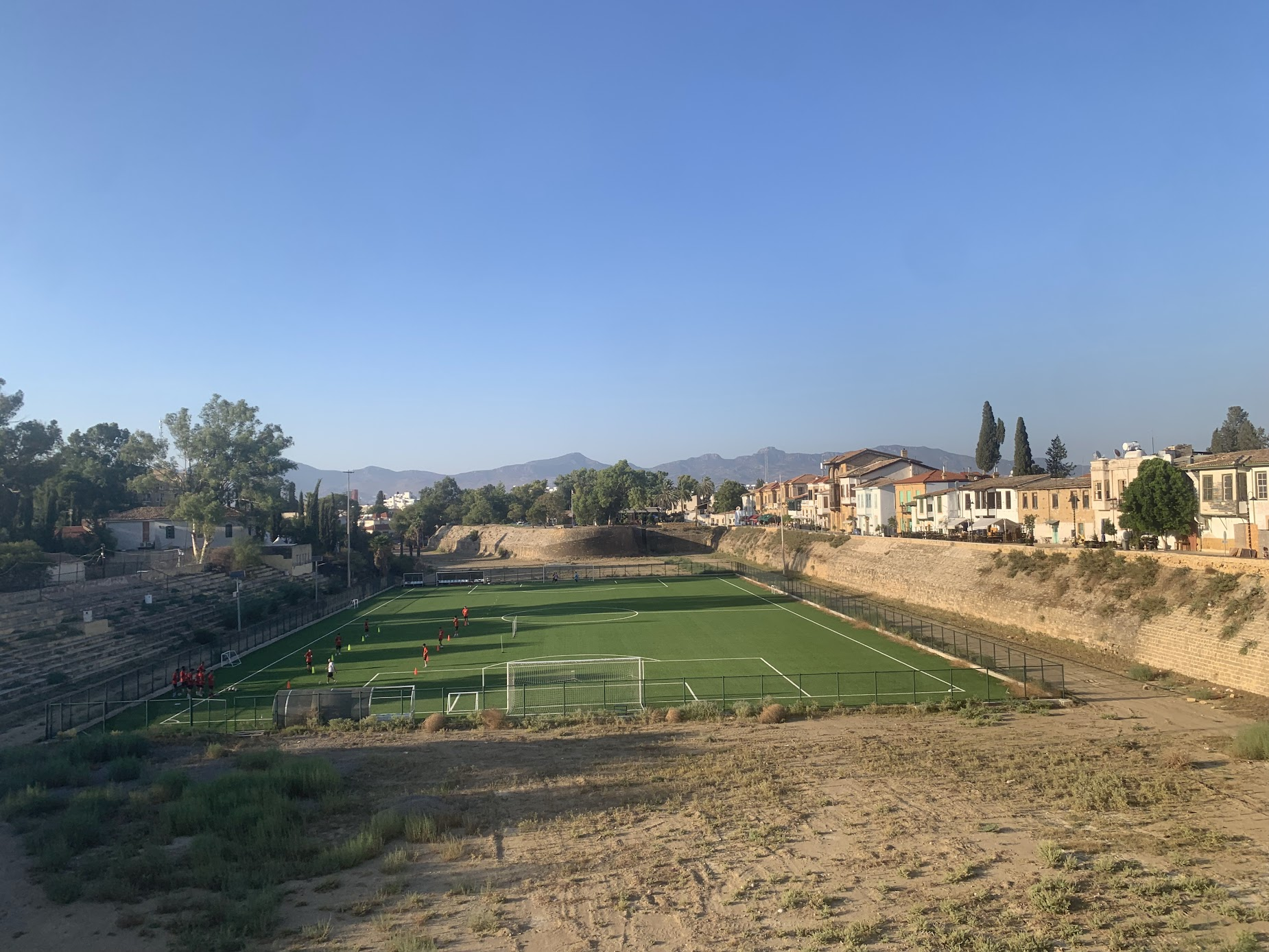
Çetinkaya Football field with the backdrop of Pentadaktylos/Beşparmak mountain range
