= Bedrettin Demirel Avenue =

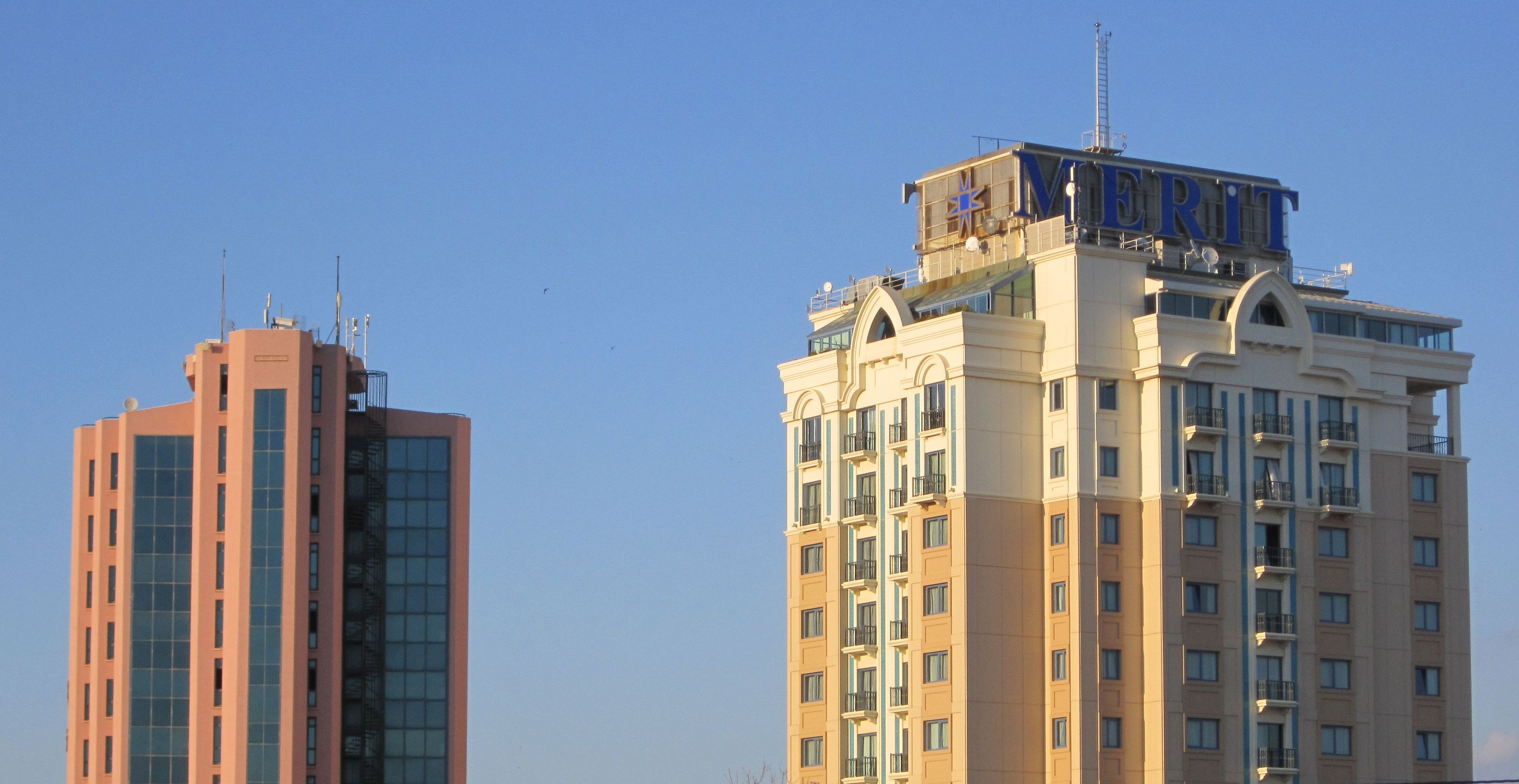
High-rises on the Bedrettin Demirel Avenue. On the left, the Yüksel Ahmet Raşit headquarters. On the right, the Merit Hotel, the tallest building in North Nicosia.

Bedrettin Demirel Avenue (Turkish: Bedrettin Demirel Caddesi) is an avenue in North Nicosia. It is one of the busiest avenues in the northern part of the city.

The avenue was known as "Hilarion Avenue" during the British rule. It was widened in time and several tall buildings ("tall" in local standards) were built alongside it. The headquarters of the Yüksel Ahmet Raşit Group, located on the avenue, was the tallest building in North Nicosia until it was surpassed by the Merit Hotel next to it in the early 2010s.

The Assembly of the Republic, TRNC Ministry of Health, Embassy of Turkey to the TRNC, Turkish Cypriot Electrical Corporation (KIB-TEK) headquarters, Turkish Cypriot Chamber of Commerce headquarters and many businesses are located on the avenue. It intersects with Mehmet Akif Avenue and Selçuklu Avenue at the Junction of the Prime Ministry.
