= Ayios Andreas (Tophane) =

- ΄Αγιος Ανδρέας, Ay Andrea
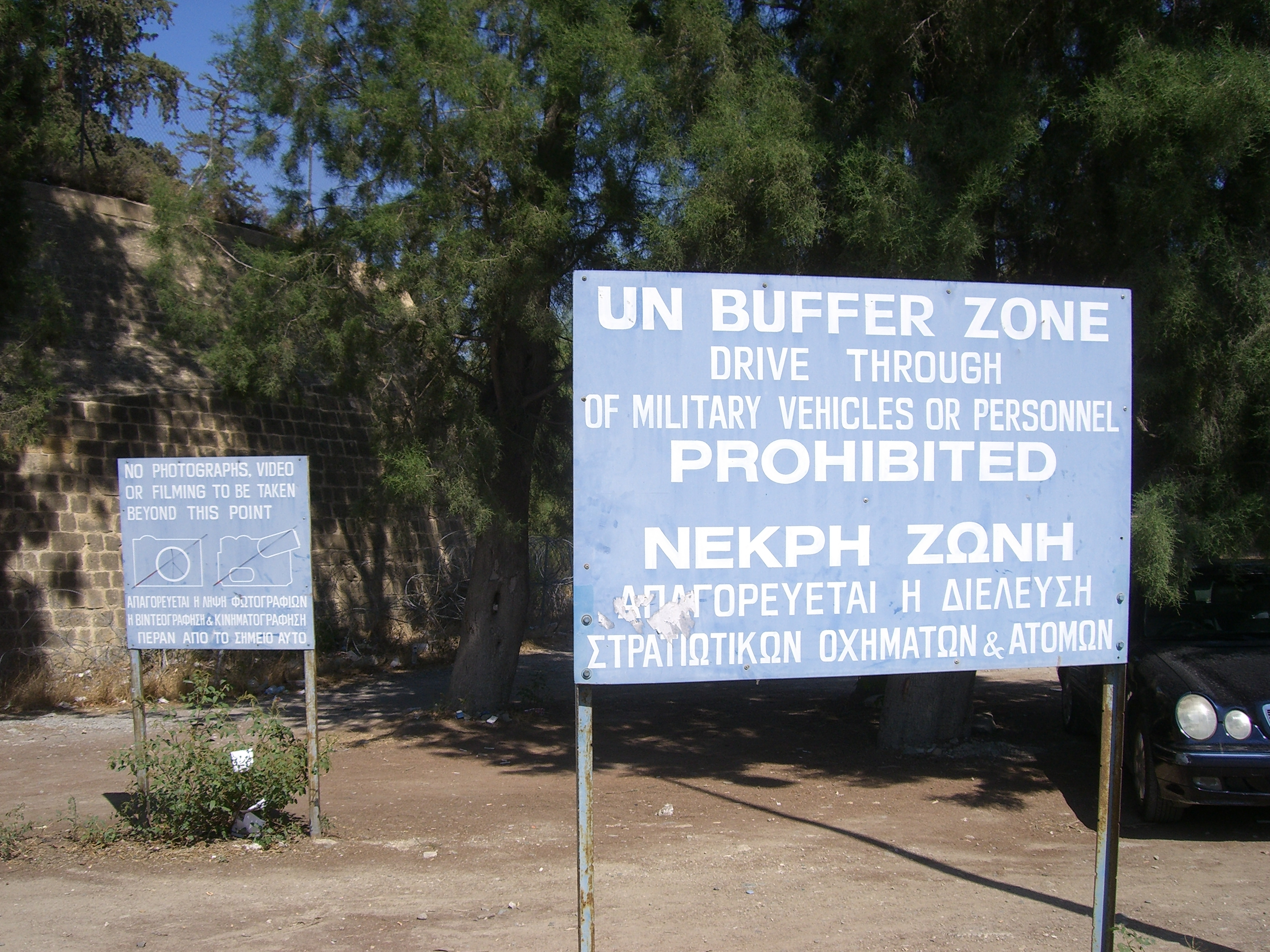
- Buffer zone in Nicosia

- Location in Cyprus
- Coordinates: 35°10′25″N 33°21′24″E
- Country: Cyprus
- District: Nicosia District
- Municipality: Nicosia

Population (2011)
  - Total: 5,767
- Time zone: UTC+2 (EET)
  - Summer (DST): UTC+3 (EEST)

Ayios Andreas or Tophane is a Neighbourhood, Quarter, Mahalla or Parish of Nicosia, Cyprus. In September 1945, the Ottoman name of Tophane (which means arsenal) was changed to Ayios Andreas, but there is no parish church of that name.

At the last Census (2011) it had a population of 5,767, an increase from a population of 5,185 in 2001. It covers an area in the south-western part of the municipal area of Nicosia, within and without the walls.

The population in 1946 was 3,012, consisting of 2,224 Greek Cypriots, 152 Turkish Cypriots and 636 others.

== History ==
Tophane/Ayios Andreas is one of the 24 historic Neighbourhoods of Nicosia within the walls. In 1923 it was extended to encompass an area outside the walls. The northern boundary (with Arab Ahmet Quarter) ran west from the opening in the walls by Paphos Gate, along the Bridge Road, across the Pediaios Potamos Bridge and along the Central Prison Road until it met the municipal boundary (Subsequent adjustment placed the northern boundary slightly north of this.). The southern boundary with Trypiotis Quarter, outside the walls, ran from salient of the Tripoli bastion to the circular road (Stassinou St.), thence north west to the square between the Cyprus Museum and the Nicosia General Hospital (Homer Ave./Byron St. junction), then followed the old Strovolos Road (now Gladstone St.) until it reached the river Pediaios and the municipal boundary. The present boundary is broadly similar (see recent Department of Lands and Surveys map of the Nicosia Quarters).

Tophane was a prestigious neighbourhood, where Turkish, Greek and Armenian Cypriots used to coexist together with the Latins. Tophane means literally in Turkish the cannon's house or the store for artillery ammunition, which is sited in the Neighbourhood. In September 1945, the Ottoman name of the Tophane Neighbourhood was changed into Ayios Andreas.

No Turkish Cypriot was living in this neighbourhood after 1960 and the last Turkish name, that of Tophane Mesdjidi Street, where mainly resided Turkish Cypriots, was changed into Granikou Street after 1963.

The Nicosia Old General Hospital was built in 1935 in Chilonos St. near the bridge over the Pediaios, but this was demolished in 2010. A new general hospital was built in the Strovolos industrial area.

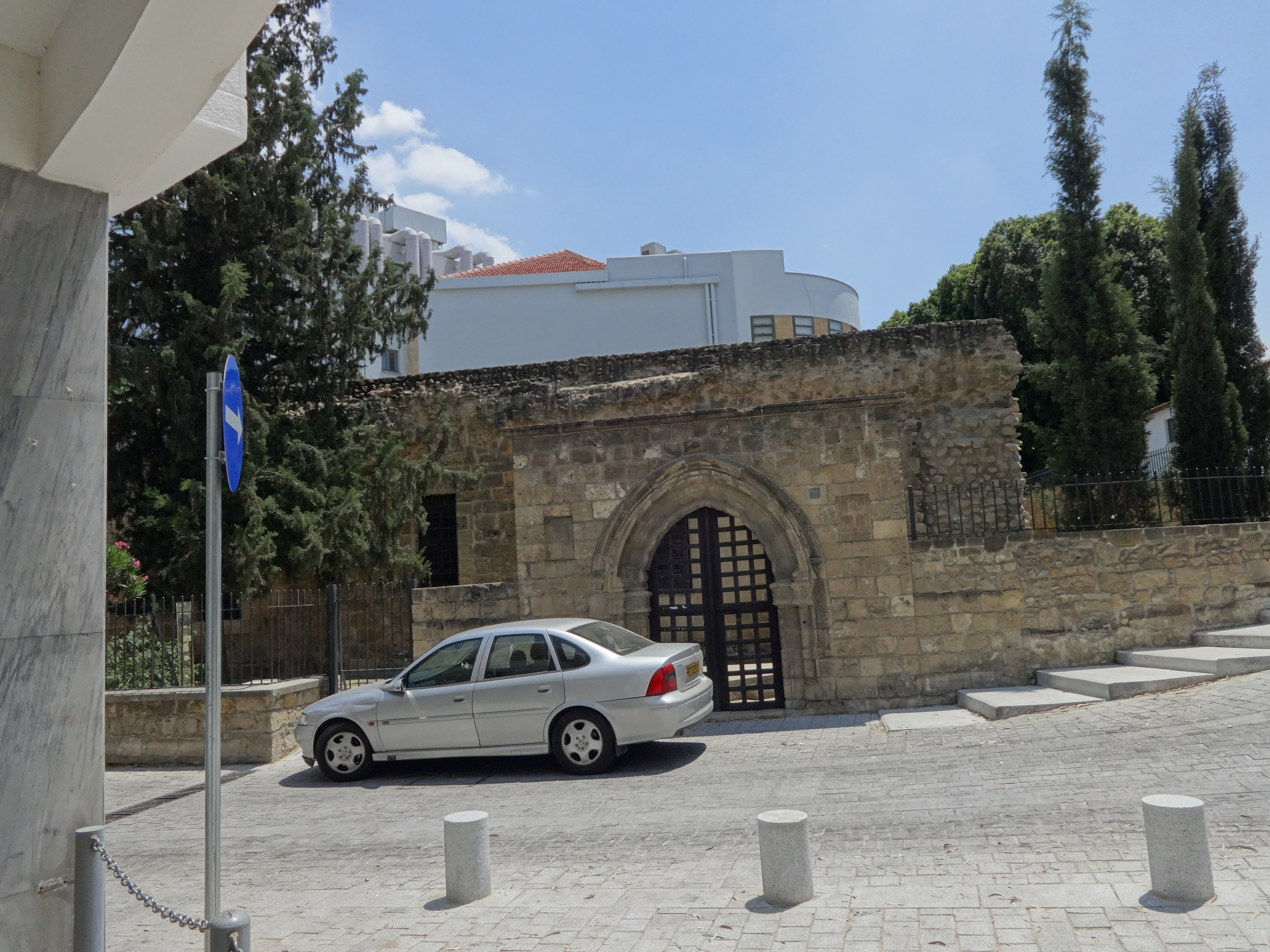
Tophane or Armaments Store House, near Paphos Gate, Nicosia

== Landmarks ==
=== Tophane or Castelliotissa ===
The medieval building now known as Castelliotissa, which is near Paphos Gate, was originally a part of the second Royal Palace of the Lusignan royal dynasty of Cyprus. It was later used as a munitions store by the Ottomans and received the name Tophane, which means literally in Turkish the cannon's house or the store for artillery ammunition. This establishment gave its name to the Neighbourhood. It continued as a store in the British period, including petrol storage.

=== Paphos Gate ===
On the west side of the city the gate of St. Domenico (now the Paphos Gate) probably occupies the position of the medieval gate of the same name. It formerly adjoined the famous monastery and royal chateau of St. Domenico, the creation of King James I of Cyprus at the end of the 14th century, of which not a vestige now remains. This gate was closed by the British when they made the new opening at the side through the ramparts in 1878.

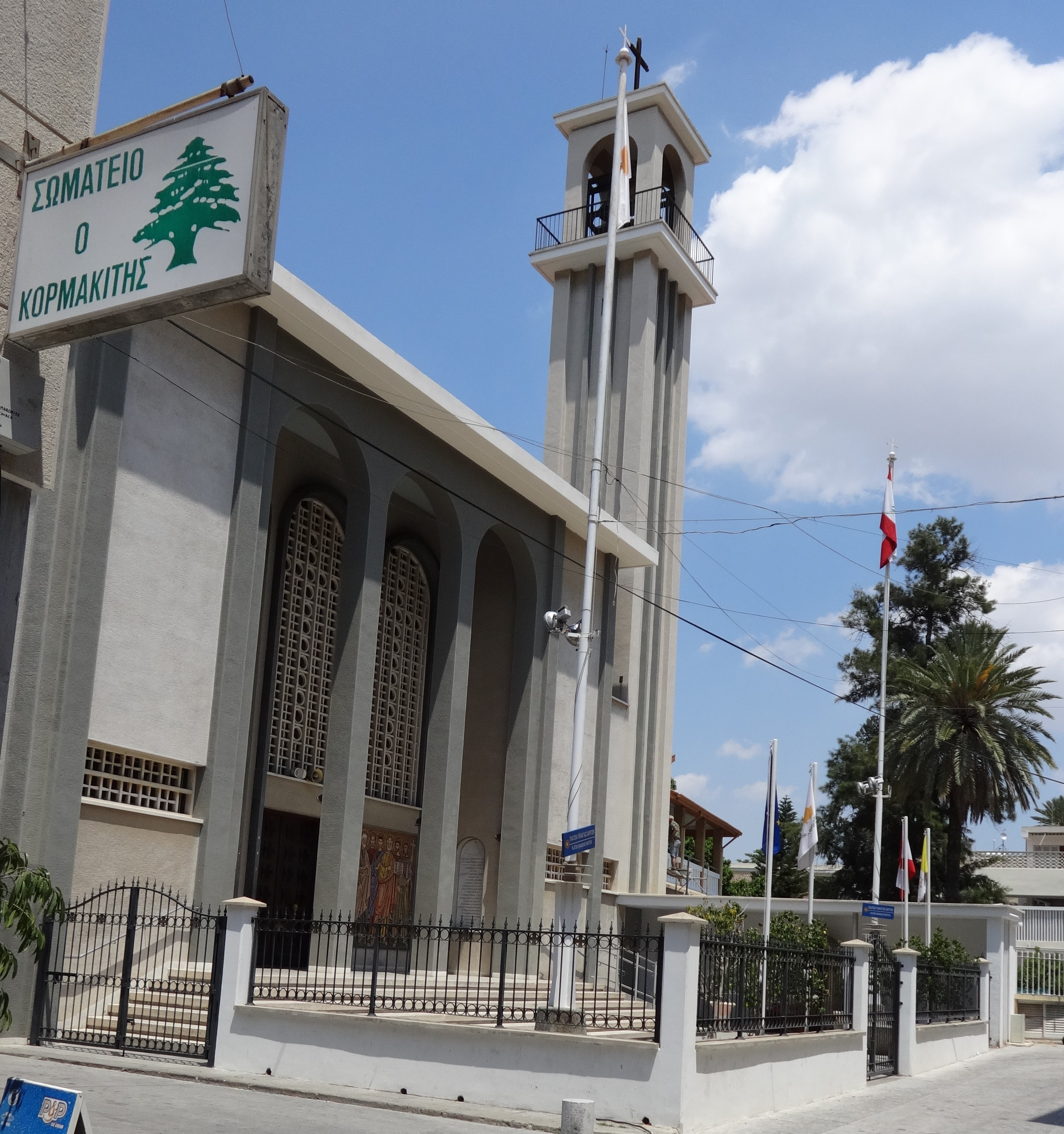
Maronite Church

=== Maronite church ===
The Chapel of the Maronite community in Nicosia was in the past a mere room in the house of the Maronite Vicar-General. The Vicar-General's house was in no sense a public building and dated from 1897. At the side of this house was a small convent of French "Sisters of St. Joseph" with a school attached. This was also considered as a private house and has but later adapted to the use of a community.

On 20 October 1959 the foundation stone of a new Maronite church was laid and services began on 1 November 1961. The church is sited in Favierou St., now renamed St. Maron St., near Paphos Gate. Its architectural style has been described as modern with some classical elements. It is near the Roman Catholic church of the Holy Cross, which is in Karamanzade Neighbourhood, near Paphos Gate.

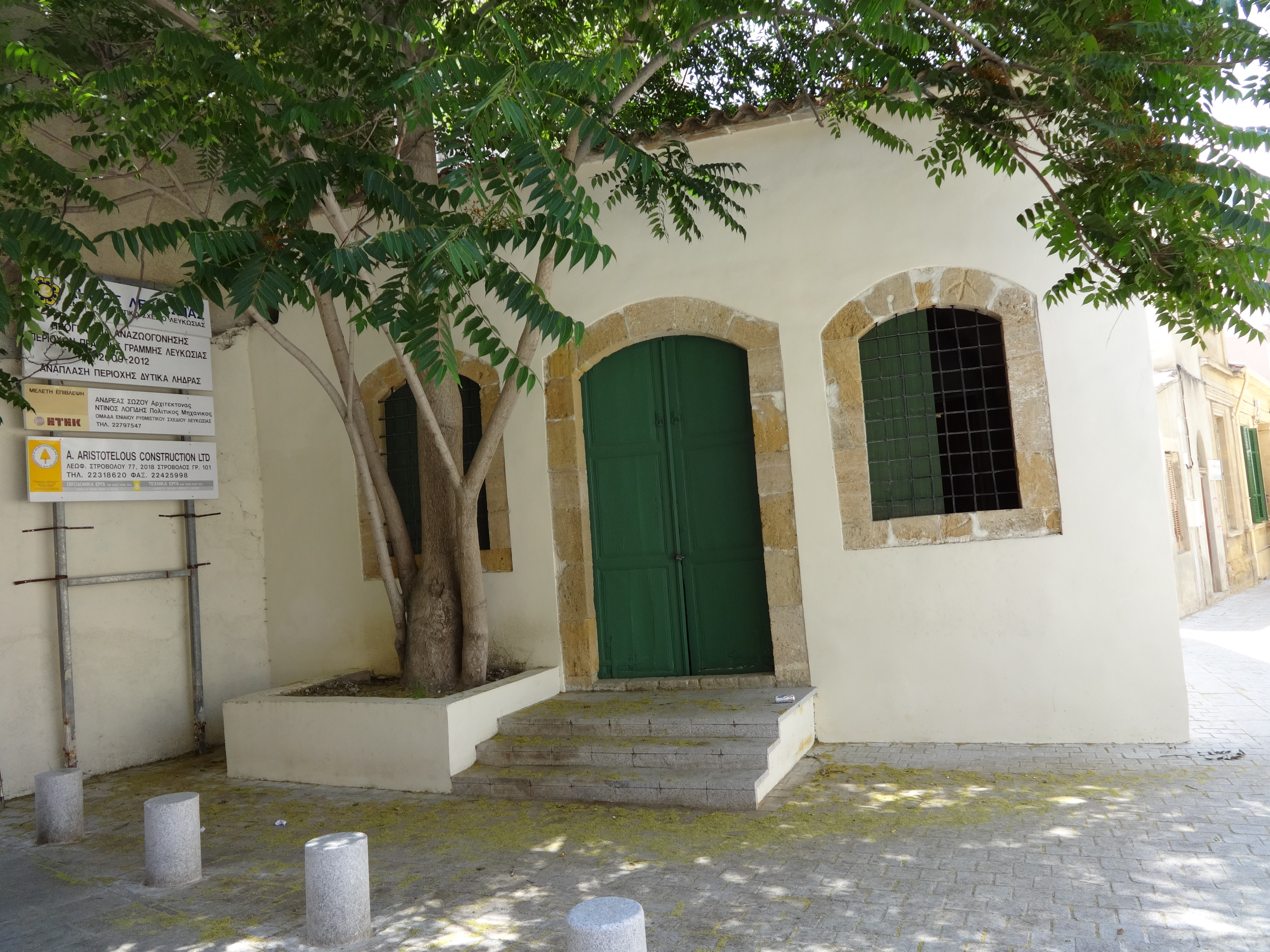
Tophane Mesjid

=== Tophane Mesjid ===
The mosque of Tophane Mesjid, now disused, is in Granikou St. (former Tophane Mesjid St) at the corner of St. Maron St.

=== CYTA headquarters ===
CYTA (Cyprus Telecommunications Authority) for many years had its headquarters at Electra House, a tall office block topped with a radio tower just outside Paphos Gate, in Egypt St.

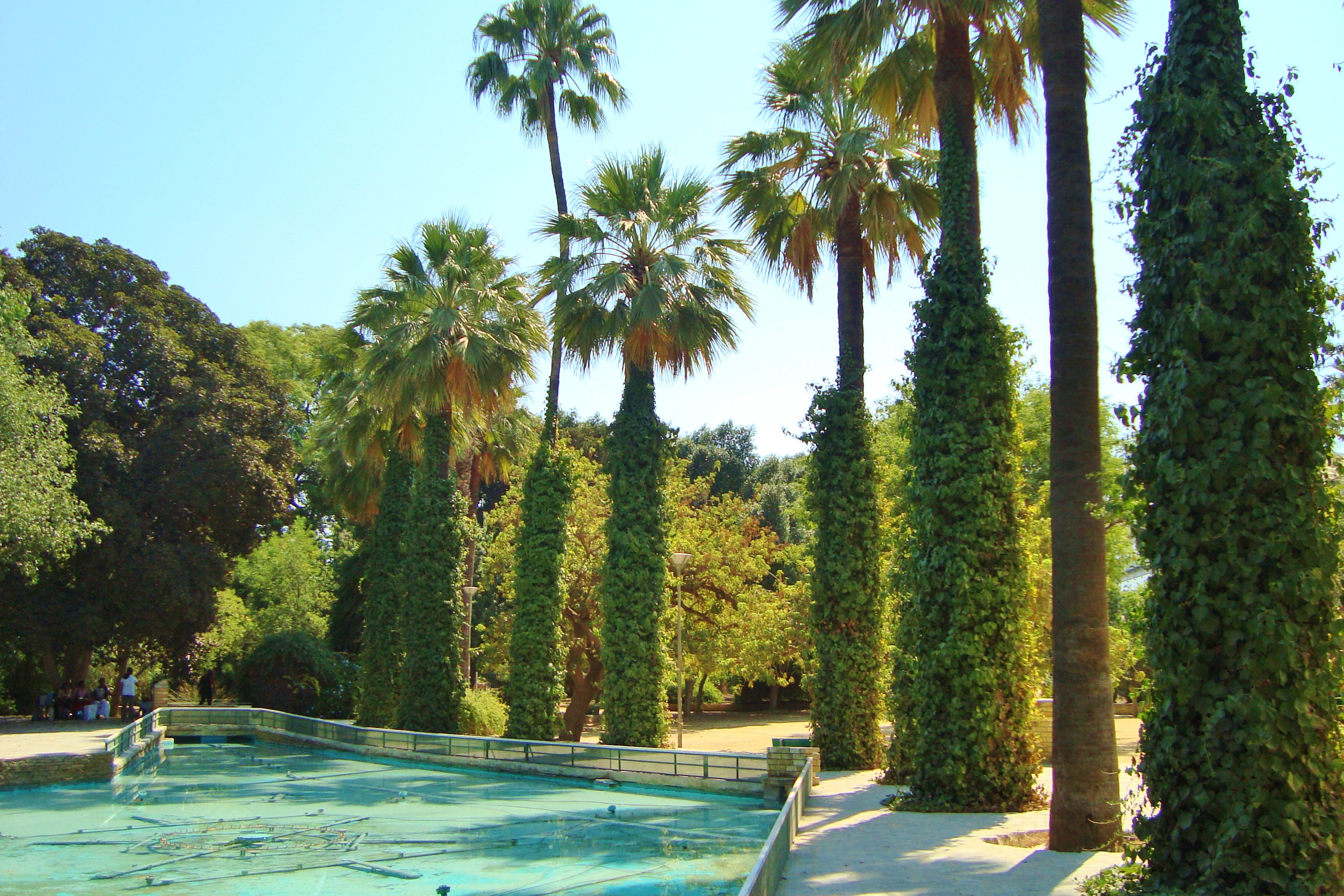
Nicosia Municipal Gardens

=== Municipal gardens ===
The Nicosia municipal gardens were established outside of Paphos Gate on the site of the former Tannery, which was relocated in the 1880s. The area was purchased by a decision of the City Council in 1901 and is the largest park in Nicosia. Located between Nehru Avenue and Kinyra St., it was reconstructed in 1968-1969 with designs by the A. Neoptolemos Michaelides.

=== House of Representatives ===
This is the unicameral parliament of Cyprus, established in 1960. Its building was constructed in the 1950s, originally as the government Press and Information Office, on the edge of the Municipal Gardens. Some important ceramic murals are on display in the foyer

=== Municipal theatre ===
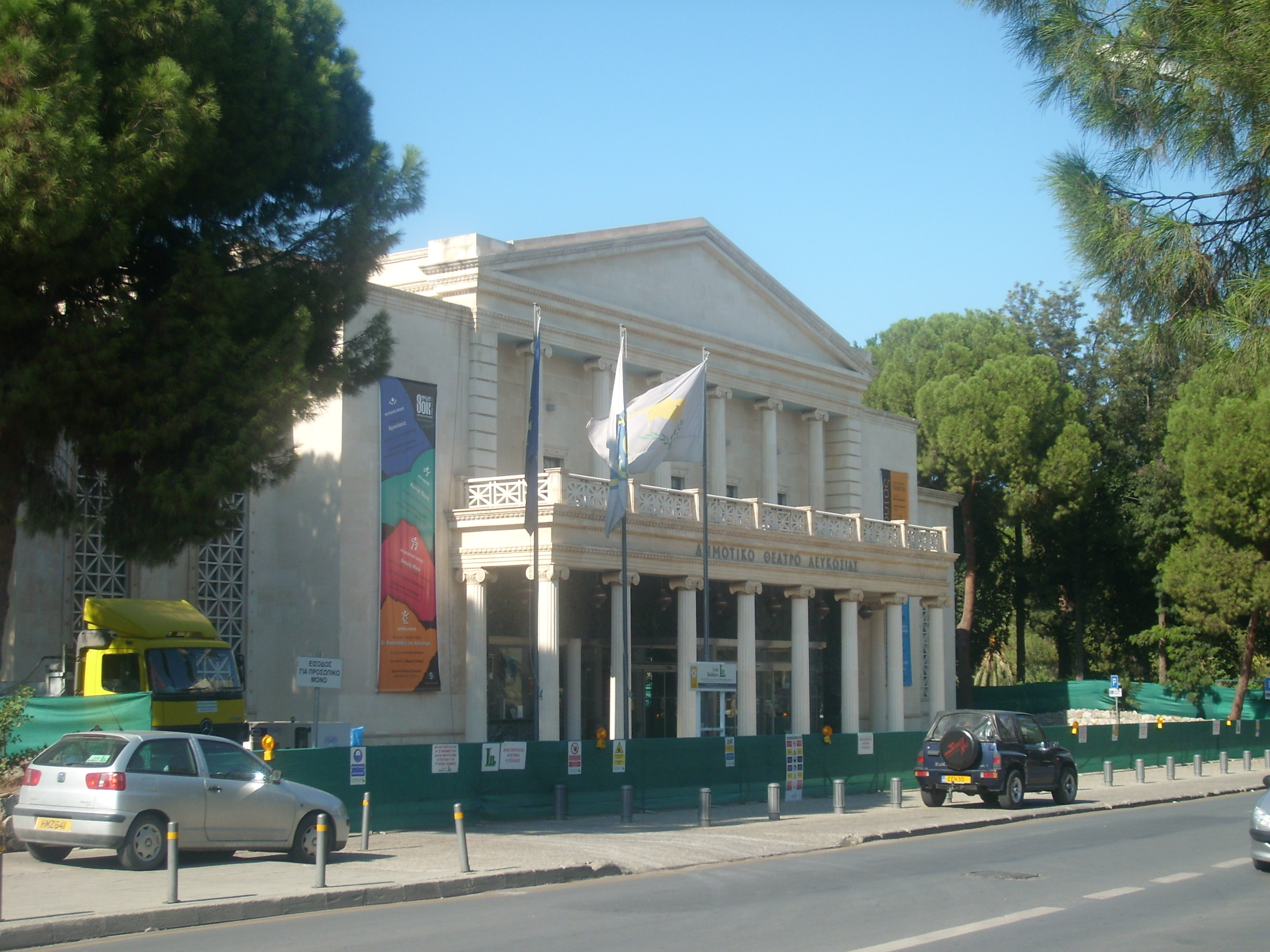
Municipal Theatre

This was built in the 1960s on the edge of the Municipal Gardens.

=== Cyprus Museum ===
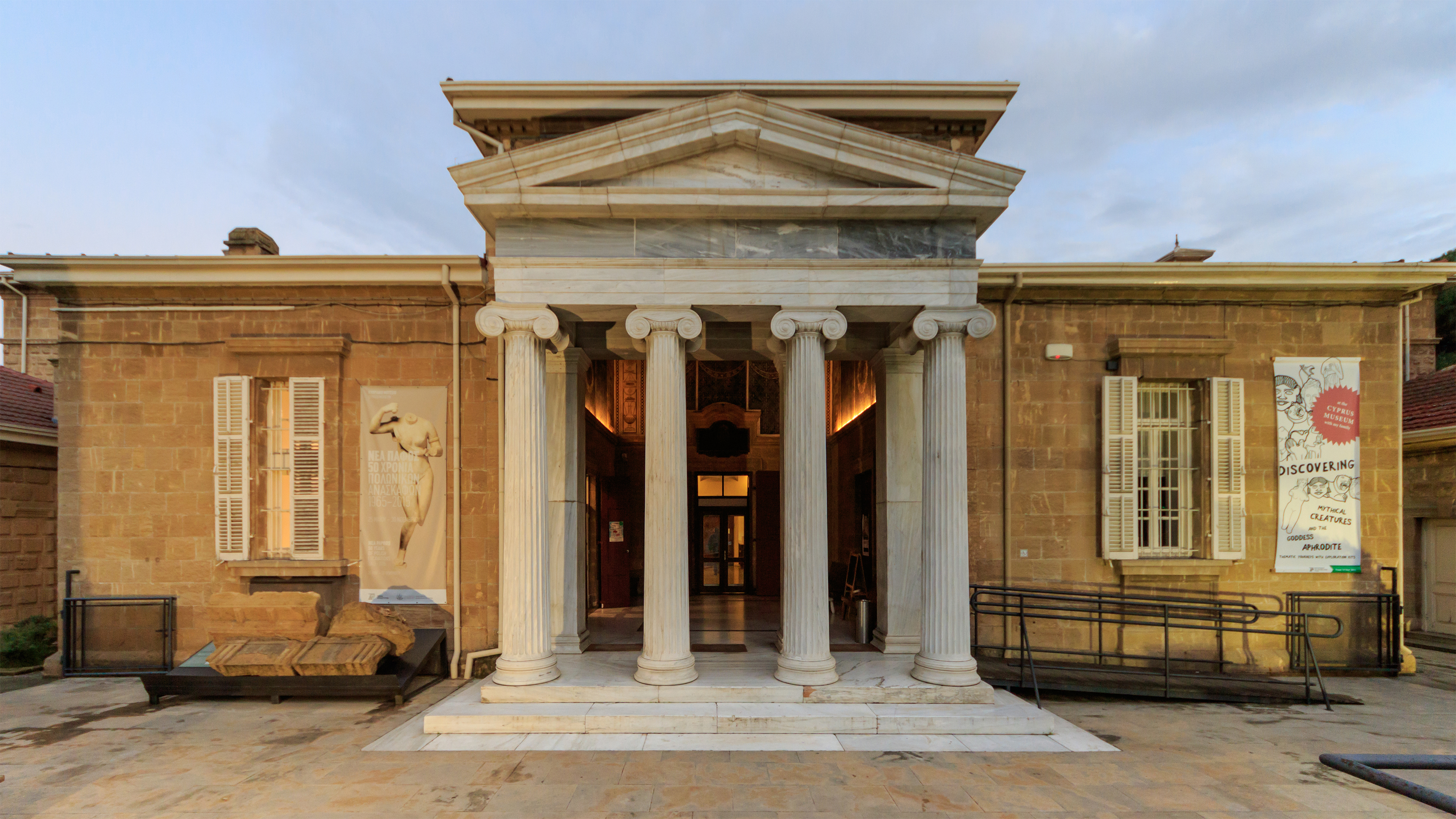
Cyprus Museum

The Cyprus Museum located south of Paphos Gate and the present building was erected in 1908 as a memorial to Queen Victoria to house antiquities previously house in various parts of Nicosia. It was designed by the architect N. Balanos of the Archaeological Society of Athens and construction was supervised by George H. Everett Jeffery then curator of the museum. The portico is unusually for that period built in a classical style

As an institution, the Cyprus Museum was founded in 1882, following a petition which was delivered to the British administration by a delegation headed by the religious leaders of both the Christian and Muslim populations. A major catalyst for this action were several illicit excavations and the smuggling of antiquities off the island. The most extensive of these had been carried out a few years earlier by the United States Consul, Luigi Palma di Cesnola, who had smuggled over 35,000 artefacts off the island, most of which were destroyed in transit. Many of the surviving items ended up in the newly formed Metropolitan Museum of Art in New York and are currently on display in their own galleries on the second floor. The initial museum was funded by private donations and was temporarily housed in existing governmental offices. It moved to its own premises in 1889 on Victoria Street within the medieval walls of the city and then to the current building shortly after 1908.

Soon after its inception, the museum started receiving items from the numerous excavations on the island, mainly run by British and European expeditions. Indicative are the annual excavation reports published in The Journal of Hellenic Studies from 1890 onwards. The first organised catalogue was soon compiled and published in 1899 by Sir John Myres and Max Ohnefalsch-Richter. The collections of the museum were greatly augmented by the first large scale systematic excavations carried out by the Swedish Cyprus Expedition between 1927 and 1931 under the direction of professor Einar Gjerstad.

In 1961 a second set of galleries, storerooms and offices was completed.

=== Law courts ===
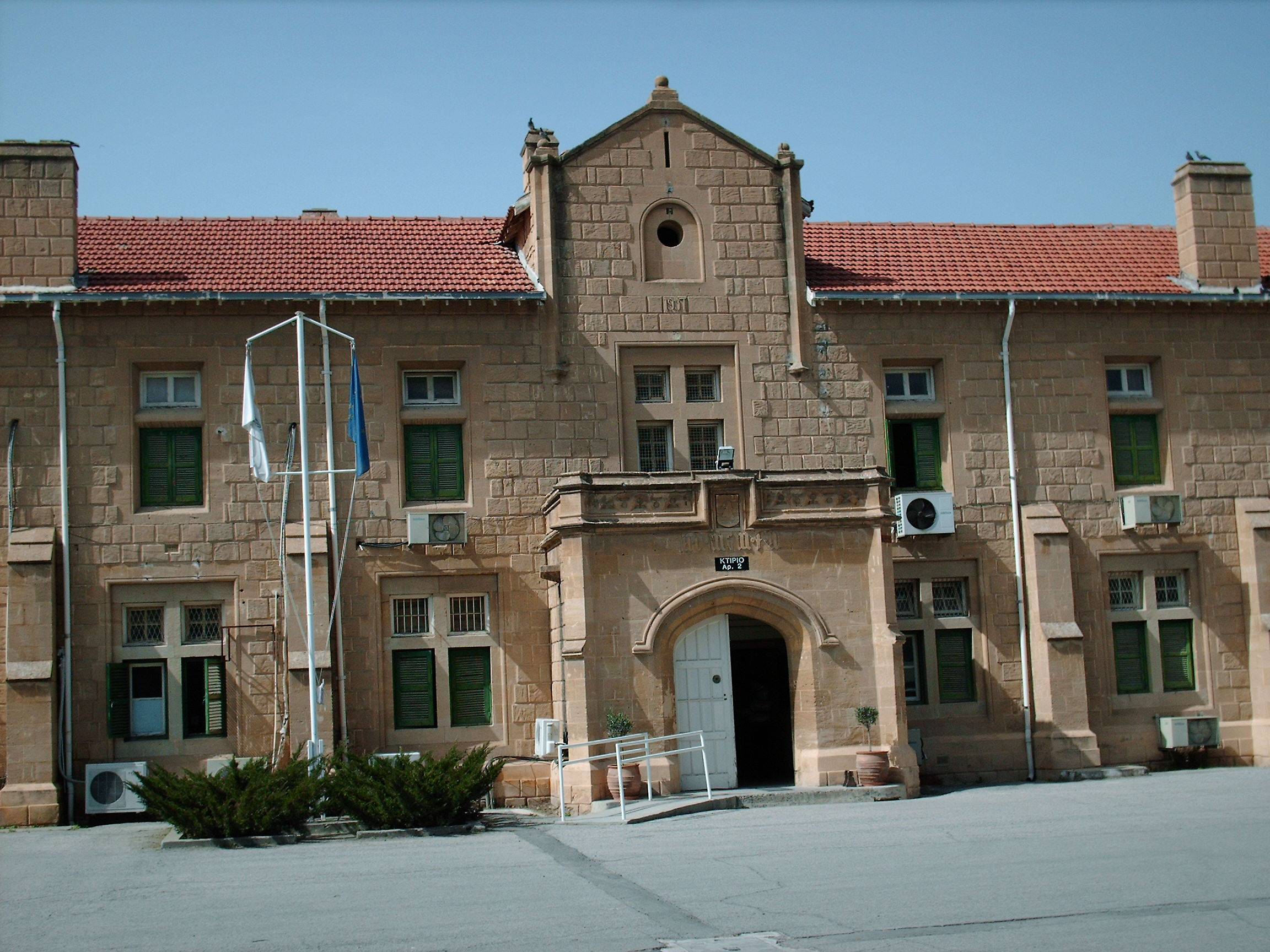
Nicosia Law Courts

The Nicosia District Court and Supreme Court of Cyprus have been established at the former Wolseley Barracks north of the Municipal Gardens. It was originally built as an English Girls School. Before independence the Law Courts were in the Law Courts building built in 1904 on the north side of Serai Square.

The Nicosia Courts buildings were originally built as an English School. The ownership of the school was eventually transferred to the War Office and the buildings were called Wolseley Barracks.

Rev. F.D. Newham founded the English School, under the control and support of the British administration in 1900. George Jeffery designed a building complex, which was later called the Wolseley Barracks. The general outline of the original design consisted of three blocks, arranged symmetrically, surrounding a courtyard where the entrance was provided by a small, but rusticated guardhouse. The wide arch of the entrance gate recalls the Girls' Schools' arcade. The lower, covered passageways gave access to the connection between the two-floor blocks. The central block with a pitched roof had a lantern above the entrance, strengthened by a projected gate, by a rusticated arch and a terrace surrounded by a balustrade over the entrance. Classrooms were arranged on the corridors, as to be oriented inwards, towards the inner courtyard. Jeffery's design followed a simplified Neo-Classical style amalgamated with colonial architecture. Pilasters with Doric capitals on the ground floor the wide arch, yellow sandstone, rustication at the ground floor, passageways enriched with pointed arches, the wooden Iattice girders peculiar to the Cypriot colonial architecture and quoin at comer were among the architectural details.

=== Ayios Andreas Elementary School ===
This is sited in that part of the neighbourhood west of the river Pediaios, in St. Paul Street. In the grounds there is the small chapel of Ayios Andreas.

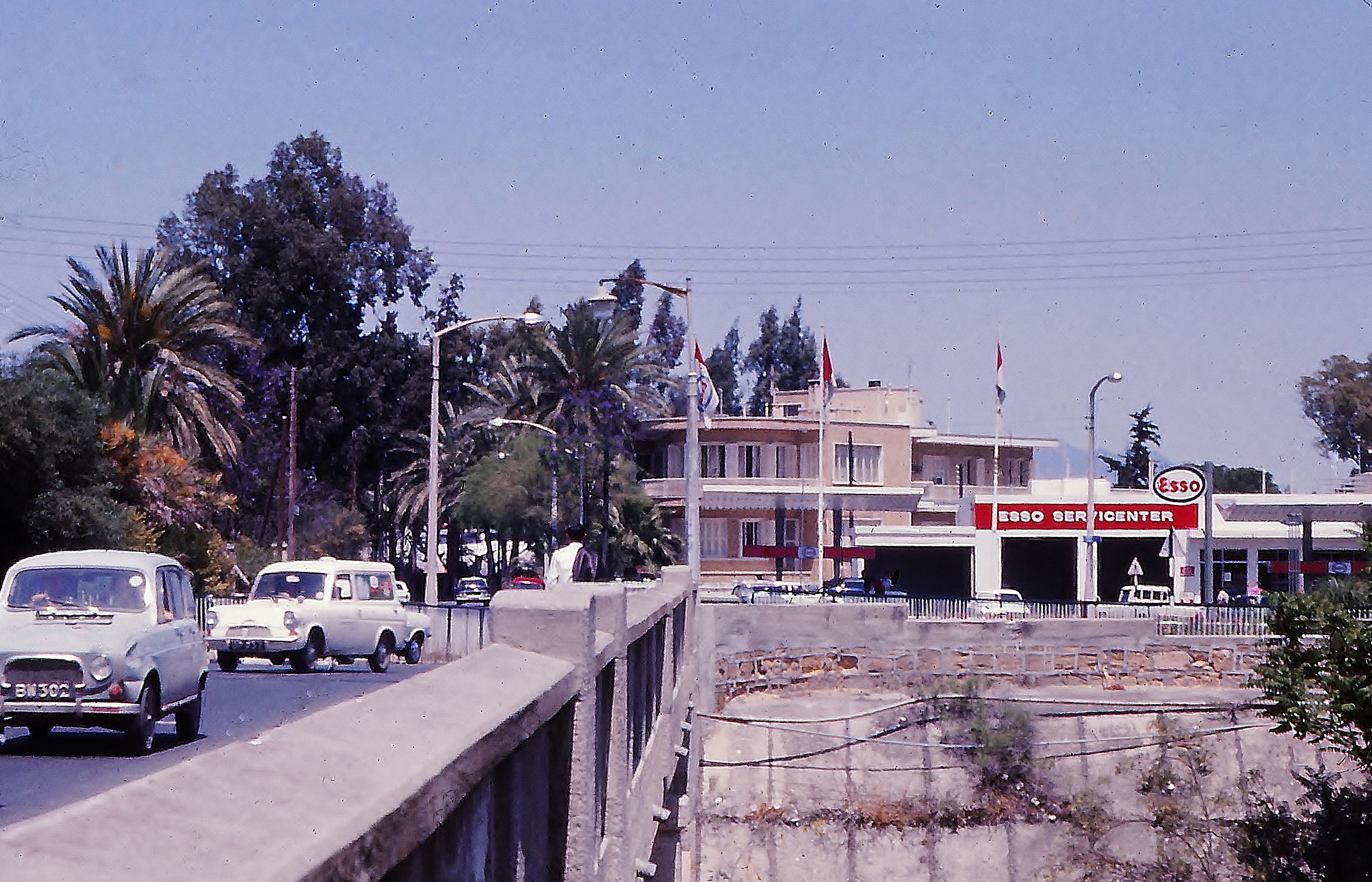
Bridge over River Pediaios in Ayios Andreas (Tophane) Neighbourhood
