= Yenişehir, Nicosia =

Suburb of North Nicosia, Cyprus

Yenişehir (Turkish pronunciation: ['jeniʃehiɾ]); Greek: Νεάπολη Neapoli; literally meaning "new city" both in Turkish and Greek) is a suburb of North Nicosia. Its population was 4156 in 2006, with 2135 males and 2021 females. The first settlement to the area was made between the years of 1930 and 1945. There is usually heavy traffic in the area, and some roads are double laned, but this does not lighten the traffic. Nicosia Bus Terminal, Nicosia Municipal Theatre, Nicosia Police Headquarters, Northern Cyprus State Theatre, the old railway station of Nicosia and Şehit Hüseyin Ruso Stadium, which is home to Küçük Kaymaklı Türk S.K. are located in the suburb.
