= Dereboyu Avenue =

Avenue in North Nicosia, Cyprus

Coordinates: 35.1905°N 33.3489°E

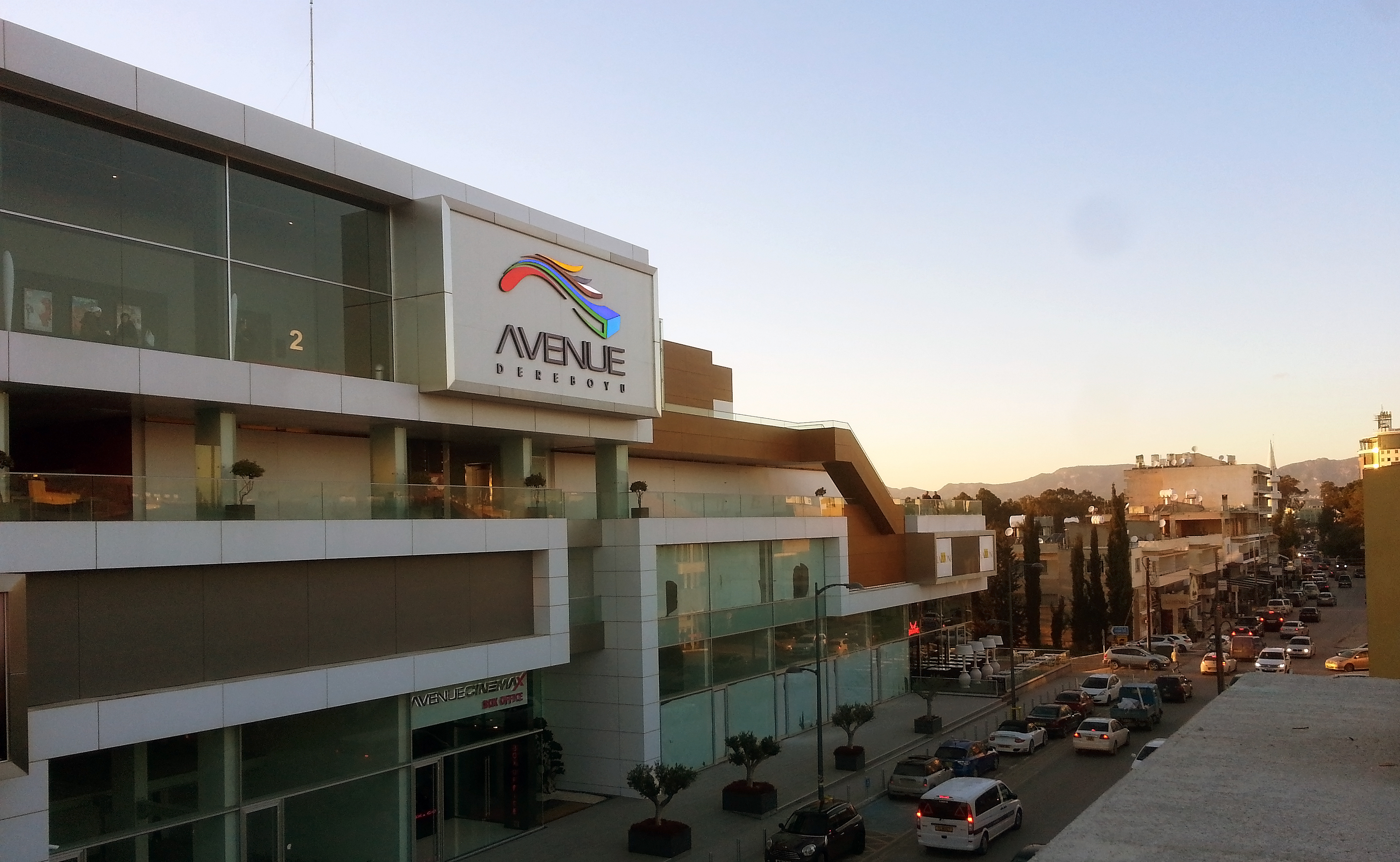
A mall, constructed in 2014, and a general view in Dereboyu, with the Golden Tulip Hotel on the right

Dereboyu Avenue (Turkish: Dereboyu Caddesi), also known simply as Dereboyu and officially as Mehmet Akif Avenue (Turkish: Mehmet Akif Caddesi), is the busiest avenue in North Nicosia, as well as its centre of entertainment. The term "Dereboyu" means "alongside the river", and although in the traditional sense this is only used for Mehmet Akif Avenue running alongside the Pedieos river, the term has expanded in meaning to denote a region extending to the neighbouring Osman Paşa Avenue.

The avenue extends into the Green Line along a northwest to south axis. The part of it under Turkish Cypriot control has a length of 1,500-1,600 metres.

== History ==
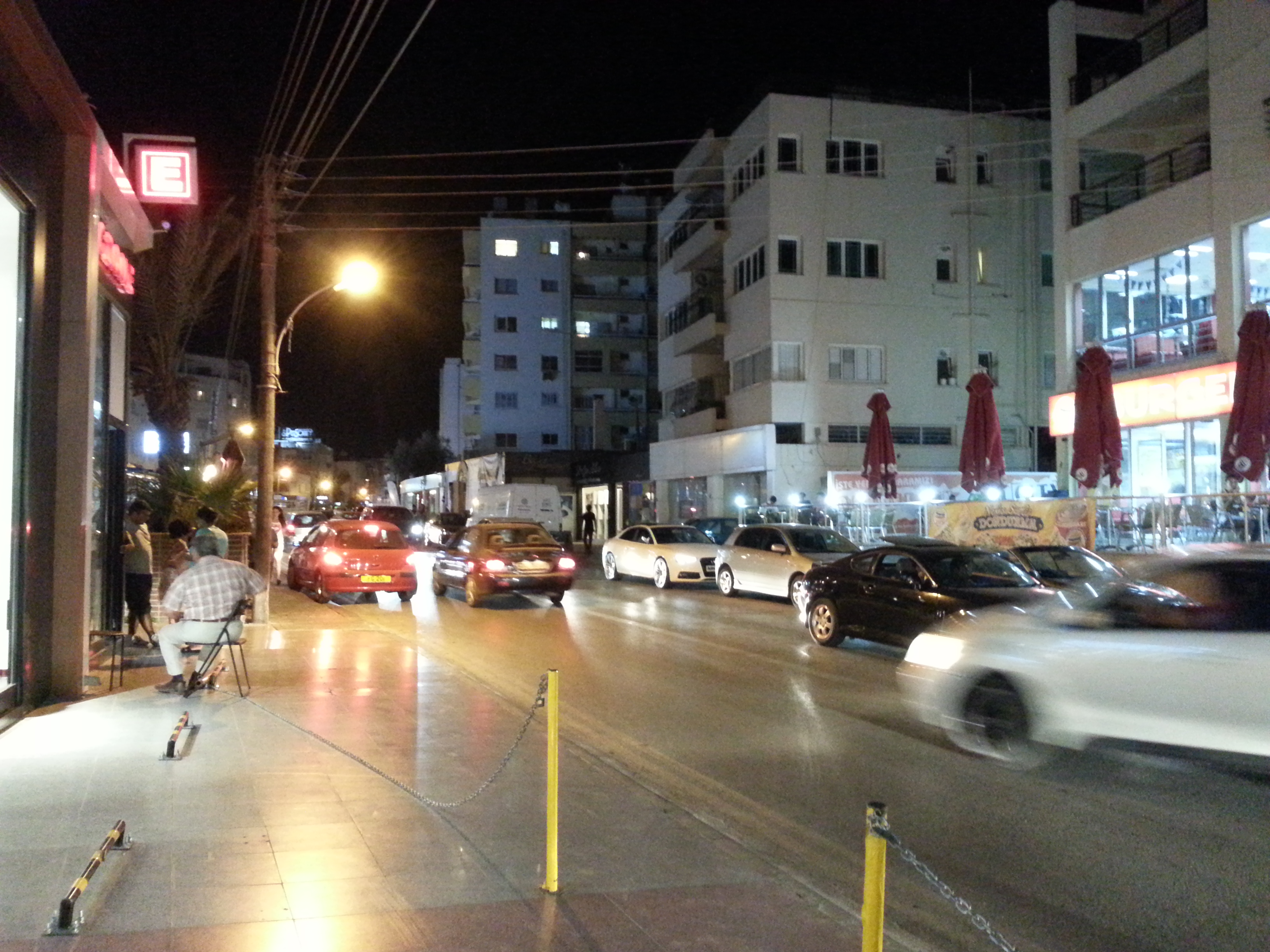
Dereboyu Avenue at night

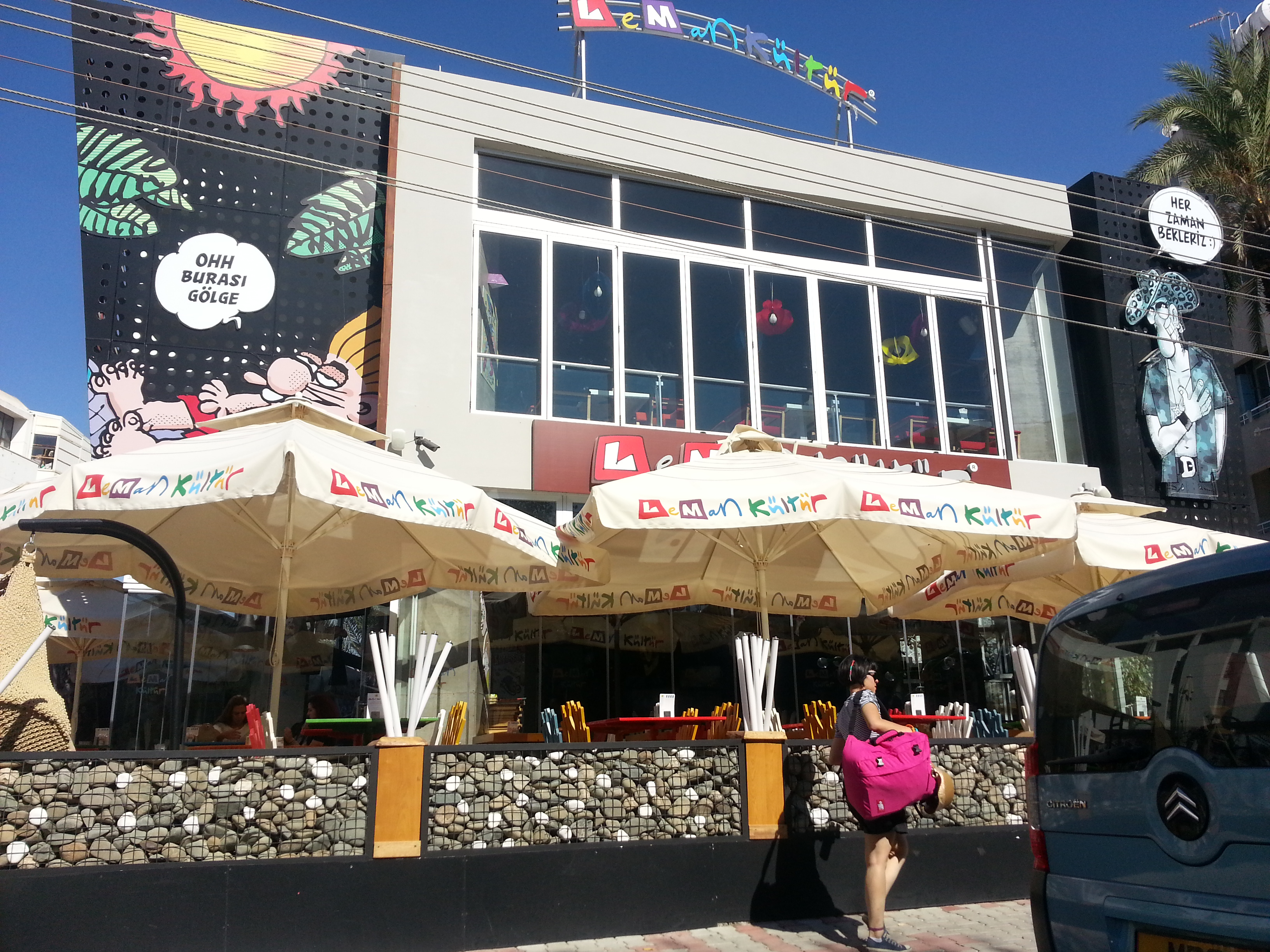
A restaurant in the avenue

=== British rule and independence ===
At the southern part of the avenue, near the Green Line today, lies a historical Armenian cemetery. Based on records, the use of this area for burial purposes is estimated to date back to the 15th century, but the graves in the area are thought to have been destroyed by the Venetian administration in the 1560s, as all that stood immediately outside the city walls was destroyed for security purposes against the imminent Ottoman attack. The first modern burials in this cemetery are thought to have taken place in around 1810. The burials continued until 1931 and the cemetery was maintained until 1963.

It was known as "Shakespeare Avenue" during British rule. Older generations referred to the avenue as "Mehmet Akif Avenue", but to describe it, the phrase "dere boyundaki cadde" ("the avenue along the river") was used as it lies along the Pedieos River. The British administration built an elevated road, named "Irish Bridge", from the avenue across the river, but the road was flooded during winter. The Cyprus Government Railway track from Morphou to Nicosia passed through the avenue. The area was known as "Tabakhane" ("tannery") or "Tabana" in the first half of the century as the tannery was located in the avenue, next to the river where a plantation now exists, having been moved there from the Tabakhane quarter of the walled city in the 19th century by the British administration. Haşmet Muzaffer Gürkan described a "pervading foul odor" in the avenue, where there were "no signs of life" apart from a few dairy farms and the tannery before the 1950s. In 1953, as the Köşklüçiftlik quarter expanded into the avenue and the first houses were built, the tannery was moved to a village. The railway track was also dismantled in 1952, leaving behind a steel bridge and a long strip of land that was then converted to a park.

In 1960, Public Instrument No. 162 of the British administration declared that the widening, realigning and development of the avenue was in public interest and would be undertaken. The northern part of the Armenian cemetery was demolished in the 1960s during widening works, particularly when Fazıl Küçük moved his practice to the area 1963, which needed to be accommodated for.

The name of the street was officially changed in the 1960s by the Nicosia Turkish Municipality into "Mehmet Akif Avenue" after Turkish poet Mehmet Akif Ersoy because it was "a remnant of the British colonial period". Considered to be an example of the Turkification of place names in Cyprus, the name change has provoked controversy within the context of Cypriotism.

=== Transformation into an entertainment centre ===
The avenue has become a centre of entertainment. Kutlay Erk wrote that this development had begun in the years preceding his tenure (which started in 2002). Before the development of the avenue, youths living in North Nicosia went to Kyrenia for similar entertainment. At first, the development of the avenue was hindered by a lack of space, as the restaurants could use the open space available in the summer but the space available winter was not sufficient. This led to the restaurants having to reduce their number of personnel in the winter. To solve the problem, a deal was struck by the Nicosia Turkish Municipality and the owners, according to which restaurants could set up portable partitions without building anything. However, in time, some businesses abused this permission.

When Kutlay Erk was the mayor of the Nicosia Turkish Municipality, the sculpture of a Medoş tulip, endemic to Cyprus, was unveiled in the avenue.

In 2011, there was a decrease in the interest of the public in the avenue, as the country was stricken by recession. However, shop owners claimed that issues such as traffic and safety due to drunk youths and occasional gangs also played a role in the decline in the business. In 2013, a roundabout at the junction with the Osman Örek Avenue was restructured.

== Infrastructure and development ==
In 2011, there were no minibus stops on the avenue. By 2016, bus stops had been installed, but their locations were criticised as "inappropriate". In 2014, Mehmet Harmancı, the mayor of North Nicosia, stated that out of 57 businesses in the area, 26 were actively violating the city planning policy. There were problems with waste management in the region, and there are plans of building underground waste disposal centres. The issue of parking is also an important one, according to Harmancı, there are 140 parking places along the road and a project to establish automated parking machines is under consideration. It has been proposed that the plantation of the Ministry of Agriculture could be used as a car park or a public green space, but there are bureaucratic roadblocks against these proposals. In 2015, the municipality announced that a new car park for 250 cars would be opened next to the river to solve the problem of parking.

In 2014, Kadri Fellahoğlu, then the mayor of North Nicosia, announced that the Turkish Cypriot military had granted the permission to build a parallel road through the military zone on the other bank of the river to ease the traffic in Dereboyu. It was then announced that after the building of the new road, the traffic in Dereboyu would become unidirectional, and new parking lots would be built across the river, as part of an extensive project of environmental restructuring. In 2015, the entrance to some of the roads branching from Dereboyu was banned to ease the traffic.

== Activities ==
The Nicosia Marathon's route passes through the avenue. The avenue hosts bars and restaurants, as well as occasional shopping festivals and concerts and the annual Nicosia Carnival. It is also used as a site for protests. The LGBT pride parade of North Nicosia starts in the avenue.

== See also ==
- Köşklüçiftlik
- Makarios Avenue
