= List of museums in Cyprus =

This is a list of museums located in Cyprus by district.

== Famagusta ==
- Thalassa-Municipal Museum of the Sea in Ayia Napa
- Tornaritis-Pierides Museum of Marine Life in Ayia Napa
- Namık Kemal Dungeon

== Larnaca ==
- Larnaka Castle
- Larnaka District Museum
- Municipal Art Gallery
- Museum of Traditional Embroidery and Silversmith-work, Lefkara
- Pieridis Museum

== Limassol ==
- Limassol District Archaeological Museum
- Cyprus Medieval Museum (Limassol Castle)
- Local Kourion Museum, Episkopi
- Folk Art Museum
- Cyprus Wine Museum
- Cyprus Historic and Classic Motor Museum (Classic Cars Museum)
- Medflora Museum Cyprus
- Cyprus Medical Museum
- Cyprus Theatre Museum
- Fassoula Agricultural Museum
- Limassol Municipal Art Gallery

== Nicosia ==
- Loukia and Michael Zampelas Art Museum
- Cyprus Classic Motorcycle Museum
- Cyprus Museum
- Cyprus Museum of Natural History
- Cyprus Police Museum
- Cyprus Postal Museum
- Folk Art Museum
- Fikardou Village and Rural Museum
- Ethnological Museum (The House of Hadjigeorgakis Kornesios)
- Leventio Museum
- Ledron Archaeological Local Museum
- Local Museum of Ancient Idalion
- Museum of the History of Cypriot Coinage
- NEU Museum of Classical and Sports Cars
- Ethnographic Museum of Cyprus

== Paphos ==
- Folk Art Museum, Geroskipou
- Local Museum of Marion-Arsinoe, Polis Chrysochous
- Pafos District Museum
- Pafos Ethnographical Museum
