= Timeline of Nicosia =

The following is a timeline of the history of the city of Nicosia, Cyprus.

== Prior to 14th century ==
- 7th C. BCE - City-kingdom called "Ledra."
- 280 BCE - Leucos, son of Ptolemy I Soter restored it and "changed its name to Leuteon, Leucotheon or Levcosia".
- 4th C. CE - Bishopric established.
- 10th C. CE - City becomes capital of island (approximate date); city called "Lefkosia."
- 1187 - Nicosia besieged by forces of Richard I of England.
- 1192
  - 11 April: Uprising against Knights Templar.
  - City becomes capital of the Kingdom of Cyprus under the French Lusignans.
- 1211 - Royal Palace of the Lusignans rebuilt.

== 14th–18th centuries ==
- 1308 - Notre Dame de Tyre rebuilt.
- 1326 - Agia Sofia Cathedral inaugurated.
- 1330 - 10 November: Flood.
- 1372 - City walls built.
- 1489 - Venetians in power.
- 1491 - Earthquake.
- 1567 - Area of city reduced; Venetian walls and Kyrenia Gate built.
- 1570
  - 9 September: City besieged; Turks in power.
  - 15 September: Selimiye Mosque established.
- 1572 - Büyük Han built.
- 1573 - Great Madrasah (school) built.
- 1665 - Saint John's Cathedral built.
- 1793 - Hadjigeorgakis Kornesios Mansion built.

== 19th century ==
- 1812
  - Ethnographic Museum of Cyprus founded.
  - Hellenic School of Nicosia founded.
- 1857 - Faneromeni School established.
- 1859 - 29 October: Flood.
- 1863 - Rüşdiye (school) opens.
- 1872 - Faneromeni Church built.
- 1878 - City becomes capital of British Cyprus per Cyprus Convention.
- 1882 - Christodoulos Severis becomes mayor of Nicosia Municipality.
- 1883 - Cyprus Museum established.
- 1885 - Population: 11,513.
- 1892 - Sourp Boghos (chapel) built.

== 20th century ==
- 1901 - Population: 14,752.
- 1912 - Population: 16,400.
- 1915 - Venetian Column installed in Sarayonu Square.
- 1926 - Football Club of Greeks of Nicosia formed.
- 1927 - Public Library of Nicosia established.
- 1931
  - Greek Cypriot Enosis unrest.
  - Olympiakos Nicosia football club formed.
- 1933 - Criminal Museum founded.
- 1937
  - Cyprus Folk Museum founded.
  - Government House rebuilt.
- 1939 - Nicosia General Hospital inaugurated.
- 1945 - Cyprus Mail English-language newspaper begins publication.
- 1946 - Population: 34,485.
- 1948 - Athletic Club Omonia Nicosia (football club) formed.
- 1949
  - Ledra Palace Hotel in business.
  - Neos dēmokratēs newspaper begins publication.
  - Nicosia Airport terminal building opens.
- 1955 - National Organisation of Cypriot Fighters attack British properties.
- 1956
  - Archbishop's Palace built.
  - Fence erected between Greek and Turkish communities.
- 1958 - Nicosia Turkish Municipality established.
- 1959 - Diomedes Skettos becomes mayor.

=== 1960s–1970s ===
- 1960
  - City becomes capital of Republic of Cyprus.
  - Makhi newspaper begins publication.
  - Hadjigeorgakis Kornesios Mansion (museum) opens.
- 1963
  - City divided by the Green Line.
  - Central Bank of Cyprus headquartered in city.
- 1967
  - Nicosia Municipal Theatre opens.
  - 20 April: Airplane crash.
- 1969
  - Nicosia municipal gardens laid out.
  - Cyprus Popular Bank branch opens.
- 1970 - Theatrical Organization of Cyprus established.
- 1971 - Lellos Demetriades becomes mayor.
- 1974
  - 15 July: 1974 Cypriot coup d'état at Presidential Palace.
  - 20 July: Turkish invasion.
  - Battle of Nicosia Airport
  - 14 August: Turks in power in northern quarter of Nicosia.
  - 16 August: Tank battle in northern quarter of Nicosia.
  - United Nations Buffer Zone established.
  - United Nations Peacekeeping Force in Cyprus headquartered in Lakatamia.
  - Christoforos Kithreotis becomes mayor, succeeded by Lellos Demetriades.
- 1975 - North Nicosia becomes capital of de facto Turkish Federated State of Cyprus.
- 1977
  - Nicosia International Airport commercial flights end.
  - Presidential Palace rebuilt.
- 1978 - Makario Stadium opens.

=== 1980s–1990s ===
- 1980
  - Lefkotheo sports arena and Pantheon Cineplex open.
  - University of Nicosia established.
- 1982 - Population: 180,000 (estimate).
- 1983 - North Nicosia becomes capital of Turkish Republic of Northern Cyprus.
- 1984 - Leventis Municipal Museum of Nicosia established.
- 1985 - State Library of Cyprus opens.
- 1989 - University of Cyprus established.
- 1994 - Nicosia Municipal Arts Centre inaugurated.
- 1995 - Museum of the History of Cypriot Coinage established.
- 1996
  - Cyprus Stock Exchange headquartered in city.
  - Cyprus Museum of Natural History inaugurated.
  - Shacolas Tower built.
- 1999 - GSP Stadium opens.

== 21st century ==
- 2001
  - Nicosia Master Plan enacted (urban planning).
  - Population: 254,032 (estimate: 206,200 Greek side; 47,832 Turkish side).
- 2002 - Kutlay Erk becomes mayor of North Nicosia.
- 2003 - 23 April: Green Line checkpoint at Ledra Palace established.
- 2004
  - Cyprus International Film Festival begins.
  - 1 May: Cyprus becomes part of the European Union.
- 2005 - Hamam Omerye Baths restored.
- 2006
  - Cemal Metin Bulutoğluları becomes mayor of North Nicosia.
  - Population: 398,293.
- 2008
  - 3 April: Ledra Street crossing reopens.
  - Intercultural Centre Nicosia established.
- 2011 - 15 October: Occupy Buffer Zone protest begins.
- 2012 - 2 January: Constantinos Yiorkadjis becomes mayor.

== See also ==
- History of Nicosia
- List of mayors of Nicosia
- List of mosques in Nicosia
- Timeline of Cypriot history

== Bibliography ==
Published in 19th century

- Jedidiah Morse; Richard C. Morse (1823), "Nicosia", A New Universal Gazetteer (4th ed.), New Haven: S. Converse
- Franz von Löher; Mrs. A. Batson Joyner (1878), "Nikosia", Cyprus, Historical and Descriptive, London: W.H. Allen, OCLC 156001455
- "Nicosia". Bradshaw's Monthly Continental Railway, Steam Transit, and General Guide, for Travellers Through Europe. London: Adams & Sons. 1887.

Published in 20th century

- "Nicosia (Cyprus)" . Encyclopædia Britannica. Vol. 19 (11th ed.). 1910. p. 665.
- "Nikosia", Palestine and Syria (5th ed.), Leipzig: Karl Baedeker, 1912
- A. O. Green (1914), "(Nicosia)", Cyprus: a Short Account of its History and Present State, Kilmacolm, Scotland: M. Graham Coltart
- A.L. Salvator (1983). Levkosia: The capital of Cyprus. London: Trigraph.
- R. Zetter (1985). "City profile: Nicosia". Cities. 2. doi:10.1016/0264-2751(85)90059-9.
- Kevor Krikor Keshishian (1990), Nicosia, Capital of Cyprus Then and Now (2nd ed.), Nicosia, Cyprus: Moufflon Book and Art Centre
- B. Mumtaz (1998). "Revitalising Nicosia: A community- based approach to urban renovation". Trialog. 58.

Published in 21st century

- G. Constantinides; G. Ozen (2004), Nicosia Master Plan - New Vision for the Core of Nicosia: Final Report, Nicosia: UNDP-UNOPS Programme Management Unit
- Yiannis Papadakis (2006). "Nicosia after 1960: A River, A Bridge and a Dead Zone". GMJ: Mediterranean Edition. 1.
- Derya Oktay (2007). "An Analysis and Review of the Divided City of Nicosia, Cyprus, and New Perspectives". Geography. 92. UK: Geographical Association.
- "Liminal Zones: the Nicosia Seminar". Republic of Cyprus, Council for Reconstruction and Resettlement. 2008.
- Bruce E. Stanley; Michael R.T. Dumper, eds. (2008), "Nicosia", Cities of the Middle East and North Africa, Santa Barbara, USA: ABC-CLIO, p. 275+, ISBN 9781576079195
- Gisela Welz (2013). "Lefkosia/Lefkosa: Europeanisation and the politics of culture in a divided city". In Kiran Klaus Patel (ed.). Cultural Politics of Europe: European Capitals of Culture and European Union Since the 1980s. Routledge. p. 198+. ISBN 9780203081082.
- Birtachas, Stathis, Κοινωνία, πολιτισμός και διακυβέρνηση στο βενετικό Κράτος της Θάλασσας: Το παράδειγμα της Κύπρου [Society, Culture and Government in the Venetian Maritime State: The case of Cyprus], Thessaloniki: Vanias, 2011. [in Greek]
- Birtachas, Stathis, Βενετική Κύπρος (1489–1571): Οι Εκθέσεις των αξιωματούχων του ανώτατου διοικητικού σχήματος της κτήσης / Venetian Cyprus: The Reports by the dominion’s supreme administrative officials, Thessaloniki: Epikentro, 2019. [bilingual edition]
