= List of museums in Northern Cyprus =

This is a list of museums within the cities of Northern Cyprus.

Name	City	Type	Summary
Dervish Pasha Mansion	Lefkosa	Mansion	It is known as one of the hidden treasures of Lefkosa, and holds some of the city's richest Ottoman artifacts.
Library and Lapidary Museum	Lefkosa	House	Located not far from St. Sophia, it is an ancient building, and was in one period thought of as being a Venetian house.
Lusignan House	Lefkosa	House	...known as one of the most beautifully restored houses in Lefkosa.
Mevlevi Tekke Museum	Lefkosa	Museum	...from the early 17th century, was once used by Muslims for religious purposes.
Museum of Barbarism	Lefkosa	House	House of Major Dr. Nihat, during the 1960s when he served in the Cyprus Turkish Contingent ... During those troubled times, his house was attacked, and his wife and three children murdered.
National Struggle Museum	Lefkosa	Museum	Displays some of the most memorable artifacts; its purpose is to remember and educate people of the city's struggles done by Turkish Cypriots in the late 19th century
Archaeological Site of Enkomi	Gazimagusa	Site	...dating from the 13th century Enkomi, it was once inhabited by Greeks.
Ayios Yuannis Church	Gazimagusa	Monastery	Featuring a timber roof, and built in the 12th century, it was originally a monastery, and later became known as the Latin chapel.
Canbulat Museum	Gazimagusa	Castle	Named after the provincial governor of Kilis, Canbulat Bastion, built in the late 16th century, his tomb is also housed in this museum.
Kantara Castle	Gazimagusa	Castle	This castle is located furthest east, and is known as one of the lowest in North Cyprus. The name Kantara translates as "bridge" or "arch"; the castle is also known for one of the best views. During certain times of the year (with clear skies) it is possible to see the mountains of Turkey, or the snows of the Lebanon
Othello Castle	Gazimagusa	Tower	Dating back to the medieval period, this tower was used to guard both the city of Famagusta and the harbour.
Ruins of Salamis	Gazimagusa	Site	Salamis became the capital of Cyprus back in 1100 B.C.; it is also known as an ancient Roman city, and spreads over a mile
Salamis Royal Tombs & Museum	Gazimagusa	Site	Up until several decades ago this site was practically a first-come-first-served for any treasure hunter. Becoming famous in the 1950s, scientists began exploration and evacuation of the site, and found tombs dated to the 7th and 8th centuries.
Sipahi Ay Trias Bascilica	Gazimagusa	Site	Originally built in the 6th century, it was soon destroyed a century later during an Arab raid. During the 9th century small buildings arose near this destructive site such as small churches, but these soon too became abandoned. In the mid-1950s archaeologists have re-discovered this abandoned site and have been working a great deal to uncover lost memories.
St. Barnabas Museum	Gazimagusa	Monastery	It can be easily recognized by its unique structure consisting of two fairly large domes. It is named after Joses who was a native of Salamis (an ancient Roman city), was given the name Barnabas meaning a son of Prophecy by Christian apostles.
Akkule Mosque	Gazimagusa	Mosque	Built in the early 17th century for guards of the city, it was used to help satisfy their religious needs
Dungeon and Museum of Namik Kernal	Gazimagusa	Palace	This Venetian Palace was used as a prison during the Ottoman period in the 16th century
Antiphonitis Monastery	Girne	Church	Dating between the 12th and 15th century this monastery was once used as a church, whereas now it is now a beautiful tourist attraction
Bellapais Abbey	Girne	Church	Also known as the Abbey of Peace was built in the 13th century by the Canons Regular. It is said to be the ruins of a monastery and it is now displayed as a museum including a restaurant and café
Girne Archangelos Icon Museum	Girne	Church	Built in the 1860s this Greek Orthodox church is one of the best known in the city of Girne
Kyrenia Shipwreck Museum	Girne	Museum	Said to have been sailed around 300 B.C. she sank just a mile off of the coast of Kyrenia
Monument and Museum of Freedom and Peace	Girne	Museum	Historical museum located where some of the first Turkish troops landed
St. Hilarion Castle	Girne	Castle	Located in the Kyrenia mountain range and was traditionally known as a monastery
Fine Arts Museum	Girne	Villa	Built in the 1930s it houses a vas collection of decorative arts
Girne Museum of Folk Art	Girne	House	Opening in 1974 and located on the Kyrenia harbor it was originally used as housing for Cypriots
Palace of Vouni	Guzelyurt	Palace	Thought to have been built during the Persian occupation around 330 B.C.
Ruins of Soli	Guzelyurt	Ruins/ Museum	Its history dates back to 6000 B.C. and has been called relatively small, but holds a vas amount of historical significance
Guzelyurt Museum of Archeology & Natural History	Guzelyurt	Museum	Historical museum where the flooring in the museum is dedicated to natural history
St. Mamas Church & Icon Museum	Guzelyurt	Church	Was once claimed to be a monastery and houses many artifacts that are on display
Aphendrika Castle	Iskele	Castle	Constructed in the 6th century the castle now is property of the city and used as a temple
Iskele Icon Museum	Iskele	Church	Built in the early 12th century and inaugurated as a museum in 1991, it now contains many of wall paintings
