= Lusignan House =

- Lüzinyan Evi
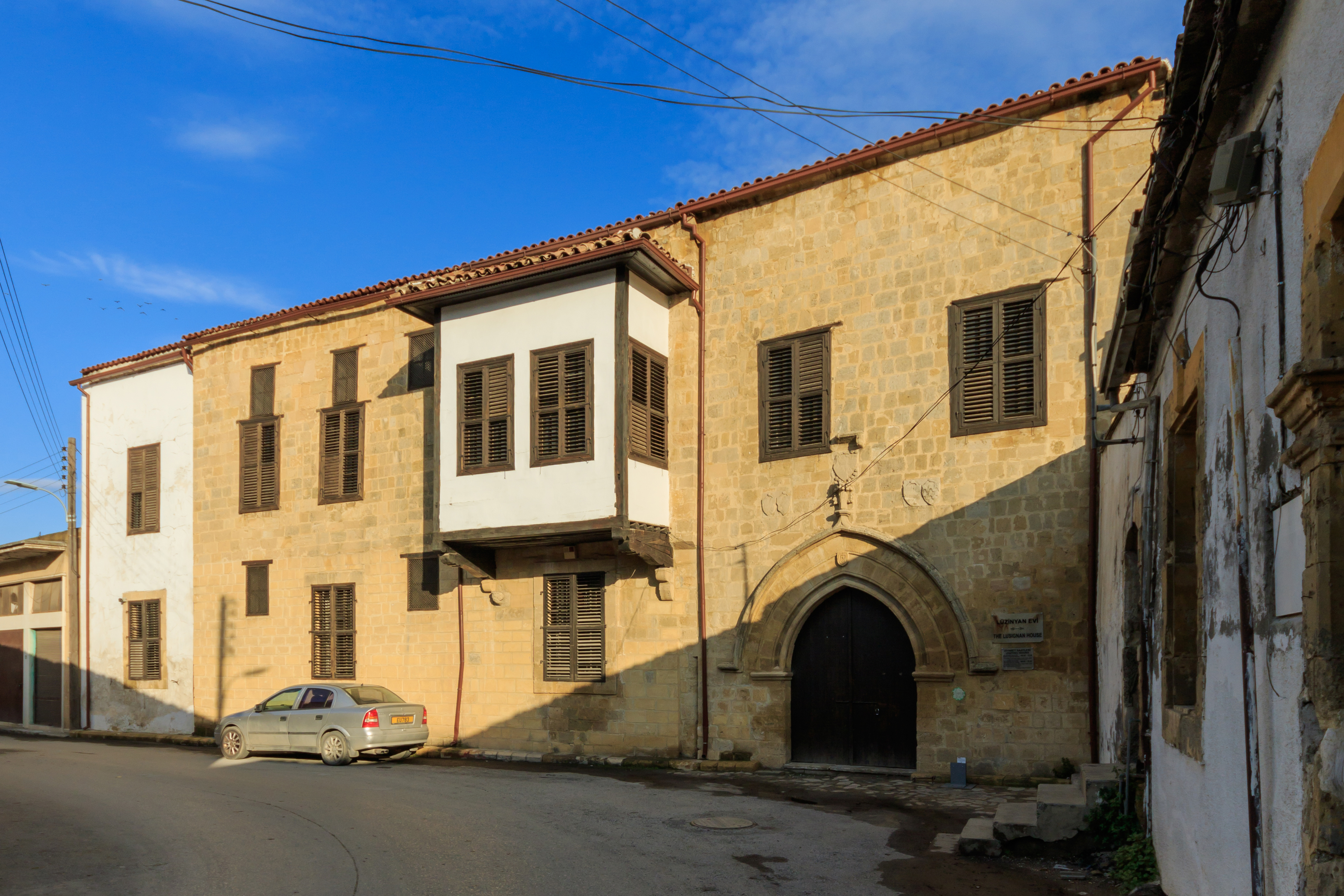
- The Lusignan House
- Interactive map of the Lusignan House area

General information
- Status: Open to public
- Type: Mansion, museum
- Architectural style: Gothic, Ottoman
- Location: Yeni Jami, 1 Yeni Cami Street, North Nicosia, Northern Cyprus
- Completed: 15th century
- Renovated: 1995-97, 2013
- Owner: Turkish Cypriot Department of Antiquities

Technical details
- Floor count: 2

Lusignan House (Turkish: Lüzinyan Evi) is a mansion in the Yeni Jami quarter of North Nicosia. It is located on the Yeni Cami Street.

== History ==
The house was built in the 15th century as a residential building for the Latin nobles during the Lusignan period. After the Ottoman conquest of Cyprus, the house was modified and a cumba (bay window in Ottoman and Turkish architecture) was added. By 1872, the house was in a dilapidated state and was inhabited by the Turkish family of "Kaloria Al Effendi". In 1958, the house was transferred to the possession of the Cypriot government by the Classen family, which then used it as their place of residence and a weaving workshop. Subsequently, the house was partitioned, and after the Cyprus crisis of 1963–64, used by refugees. In the 1980s, it was emptied by the Turkish authorities.

The renovation and repair of the house began in 1995 by the Turkish Cypriot Department of Antiquities and the building was opened in December 1997 as a museum and a cultural center. The activities in the house include those aimed at the survival of the traditional weaving art. In 2013, the building underwent another renovation, which enabled it to be used for formal social events. There is also a café on the premises that serves traditional Cypriot food.

== Architecture ==
The two-floor building is a combination of the Lusignan Gothic architecture and Ottoman architecture. The entrance is through a Gothic arched doorway with Lusignan coats of arms carved on top. Some of these coats of arms are not well-preserved. On the ground floor, there is a large living room. In 1872, Archduke Louis Salvator reported that the rooms had ornate windows and carvings, some reminiscent of the Maghrebi style, and doorways adorned with reliefs and carvings in the Turkish and Renaissance styles. He wrote in depth about richly carved shelves. In 1987, Haşmet Muzaffer Gürkan reported that much of these had not survived, but those that did survive included the ornately carved and painted ceiling in the upper floor.

In the yard, next to the staircase that leads to the upper floor, there is a pool. Within the yard there are also some ashlar walls and arches, which, according to Gürkan, are remnants from "very old times". The inner courtyard has a rectangular plan and these arches could have previously been a part of the extensions of the mansion.
