= Hadjigeorgakis Kornesios =

Hadjigeorgakis Kornesios (Greek: Χατζηγεωργάκης Κορνέσιος), from Kritou Terra in Paphos, was a dragoman (interpreter) in Cyprus between 1779 and 1809.

== Career and influence ==
Hadjigeorgakis Kornesios came from Kritou Terra in Paphos in western Cyprus. Early on he served as interpreter or dragoman. The dragoman was usually a Christian from the local community appointed by the Ottomans, and it was a significant office awarded to highly educated individuals with mastery of both the Greek and Turkish languages. As an interpreter, Hadjigeorgakis dealt mostly with matters of taxation and administration, which brought him into contact with the Ottoman administration of Cyprus, i.e. the muhassil (tax collector) and the Turkish aghas on the one hand, and the kodjabashis (the local prelates) on the other. Around 1796 he was appointed lifelong Dragoman of Cyprus issued by Sultan Selim III.

The people and the clergy held Hadjigeorgakis Kornesios in high esteem as a result this earned him increased power and influence, a result of his position and connections, the dragoman gained considerable wealth. However, he was not known to use his power and riches for his personal benefit. According to a poem by an unknown author composed after his decapitation.

Hadjigeorgakis contributed greatly to the protection of Christians and lepers, offered financial and moral support to the Church of Cyprus and promoted education. He and his wife Maroudia (who was also the Archbishop Chrysanthos of Cyprus's niece), displayed patriotic and charitable sentiments. Nevertheless, there were many that nursed negative feelings against the Dragoman. His own and the Archbishop's rise in the political and financial life of Cyprus caused the envy and anxiety of the aghas, who as conquerors had been accustomed to being the principal agents of authority and the privileged beneficiaries of such authority, but now saw themselves being supplanted. On the other hand, a part of the population resented the heavy taxes placed upon them – and consequently, resented Hadjigeorgakis, who was responsible for the collection of such taxes. It wasn't that he wanted to, but he was forced. The French consuls were also hostilely disposed towards him because they considered him a Russophile and, by consequence, an enemy of France. This resentment manifested itself in the 1804 revolt of the island's Ottomans caused by increased taxation and wheat shortage. The insurgents initially revolted against the imperial authorities, but the latter managed to turn their wrath against the Church and the Dragoman. The angry mob broke into and sacked Hadjigeorgakis Kornesios’ mansion. The Dragoman himself escaped with his family to Constantinople, where they stayed for three years.

Hadjigeorgakis appointed his assistant, a man named Nikolaos Nikolaides, as his commissary. Nikolaides was quick to take advantage of his position to become rich. He collaborated closely with the muhassil and resorted to tyrannical methods for the collection of taxes. When Hadjigeorgakis was cleared of all charges, he returned in 1807 to Cyprus to conduct an audit of the accounts. Nikolaides and Hasan Agha sent a slanderous report against him to the sultan in order to avoid being called to account for their actions. This caused an order to be issued for the Dragoman's arrest and for a full examination of his accounts for the past 20 years. Hadjigeorgakis was informed of this development and once again fled to Constantinople to prove his innocence. However, this time he was not successful. Despite the efforts of the ambassadors of England and Russia, the Grand Vizier Kör Yusuf Ziyaüddin Pasha, who resented Hadjigeorgakis, ordered his execution. By the time the Sultan's order for his release was secured, it was too late. Hadjigeorgakis Kornesios was beheaded in Constantinople on March 31, 1809.

== Descendants and the Hadjigeorgakis Kornesios Mansion ==
Hadgigeorgakis spent a portion of his wealth in building a mansion in the upper class Ayios Antonios area in Nicosia, close to the Archbishop's residence. After his execution his estate was confiscated and his family suffered several years of exile and imprisonment. Hatice Hanim, of the Turkish family of Magnisali, bought the mansion for 13,000 kuruş. In 1830, Yiangos Tselepi, the Dragoman's youngest son, returned from Constantinople and bought the mansion with a loan he received from the Archdiocese. Yiangos Tselepi settled there with his wife Iouliani, née Vondiziano. He died in 1874 and his wife remained at the mansion with the family of her niece Ourania Zachariadou Oikonomidi, whom she had adopted for she had no children of her own. The mansion was then inherited by Ourania's four daughters. The last tenant, Julia Piki, died in 1979.

The mansion was acquired by the Department of Antiquities, Cyprus and serves today as the Ethnological Museum, Lefkosia (Hadjigeorgakis Kornesios Mansion).
