= Antiphonitis =

- Location in Cyprus
- Coordinates: 35°19′38.57″N 33°37′9.24″E
- Country: Cyprus
  - District: Kyrenia District
- Country (controlled by): Northern Cyprus
  - District: Girne District

Population (2011)
  - Total: 868
- Time zone: UTC+2 (EET)
  - Summer (DST): UTC+3 (EEST)

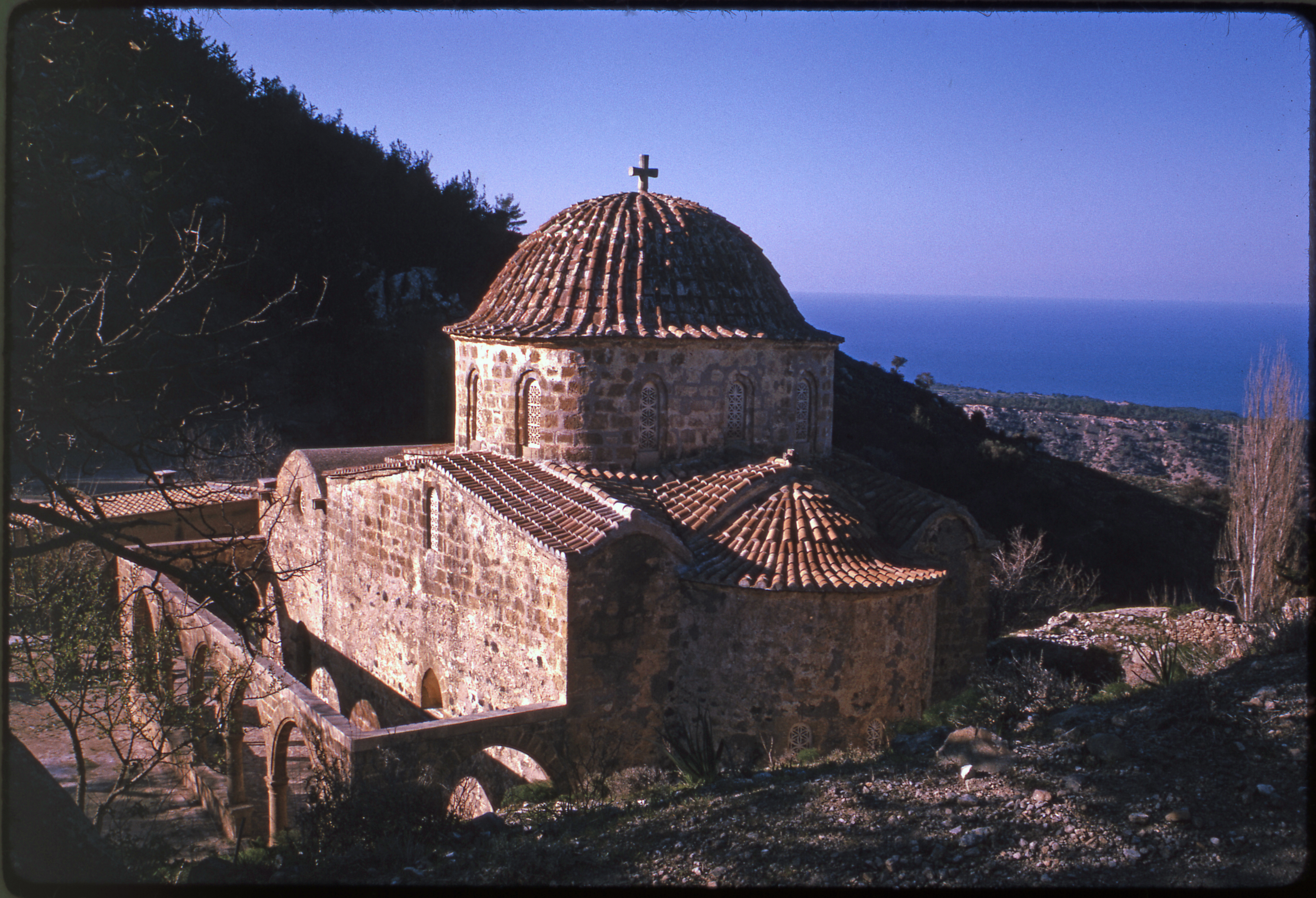
Church of Christ Antiphonitis, general view from the south east, as the monument stood in 1973.

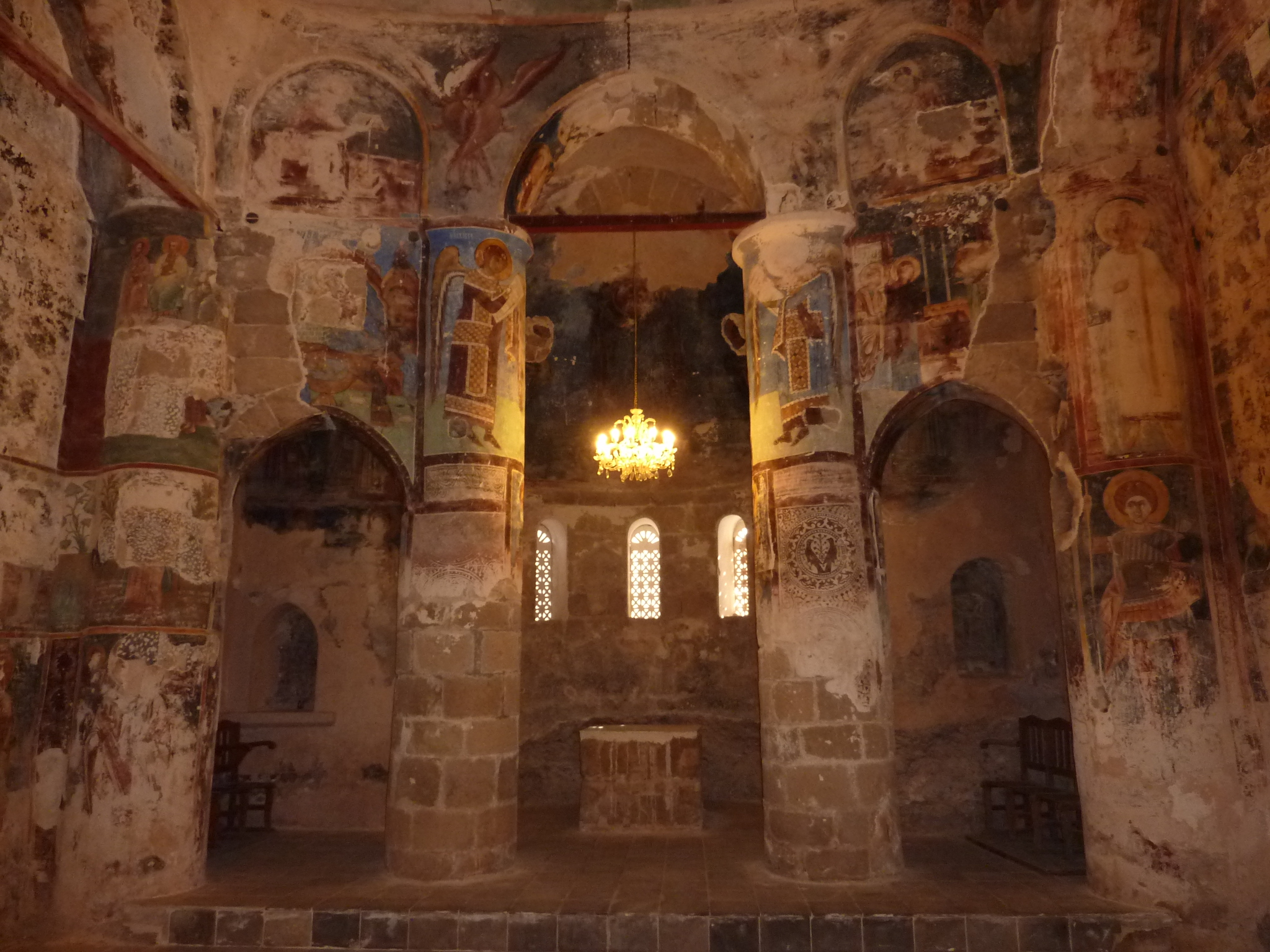
Church of Christ Antiphonitis, interior, frescoes on walls and pillars, looking east.

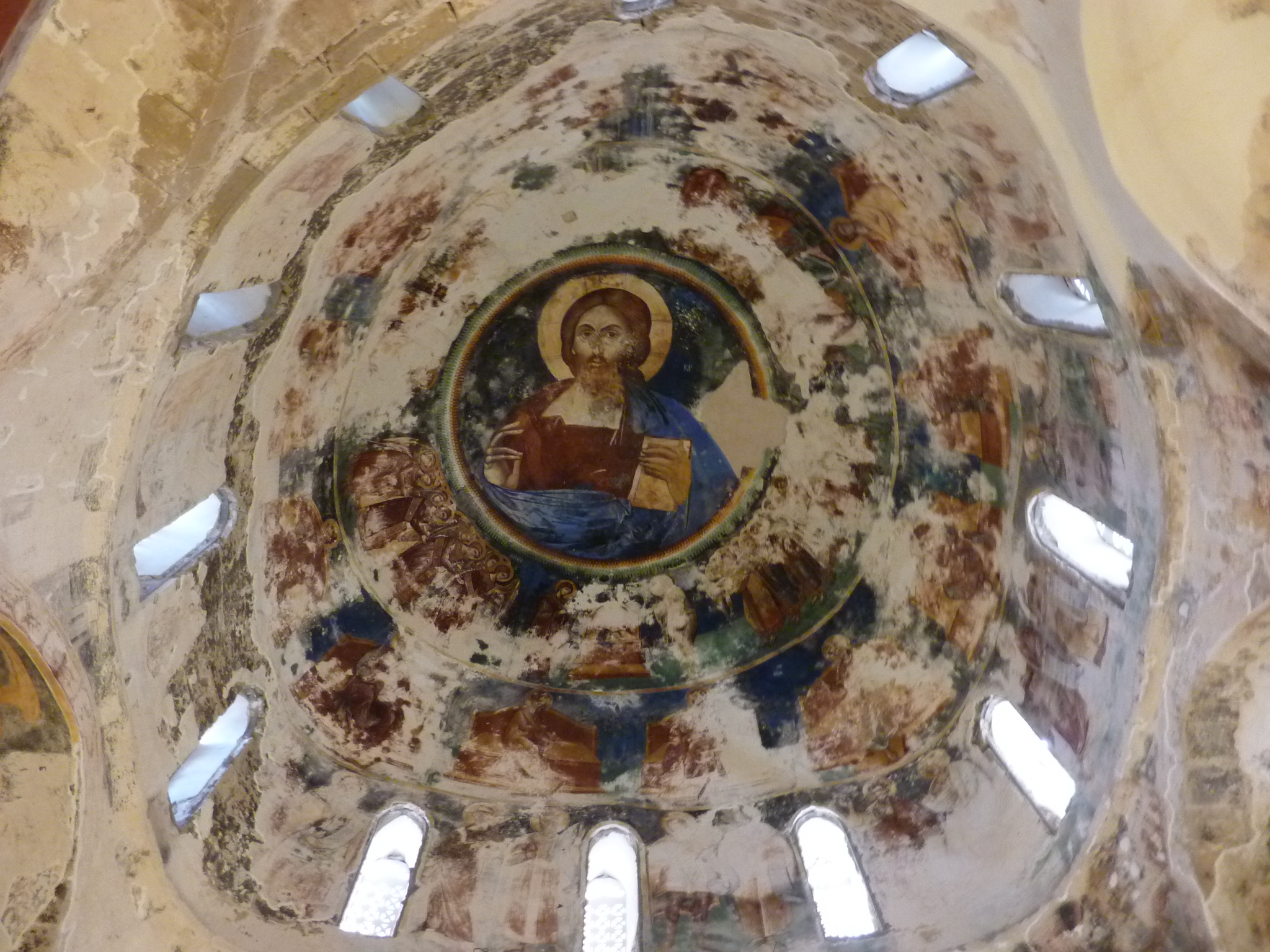
Church of Christ Antiphonitis, interior of the dome.

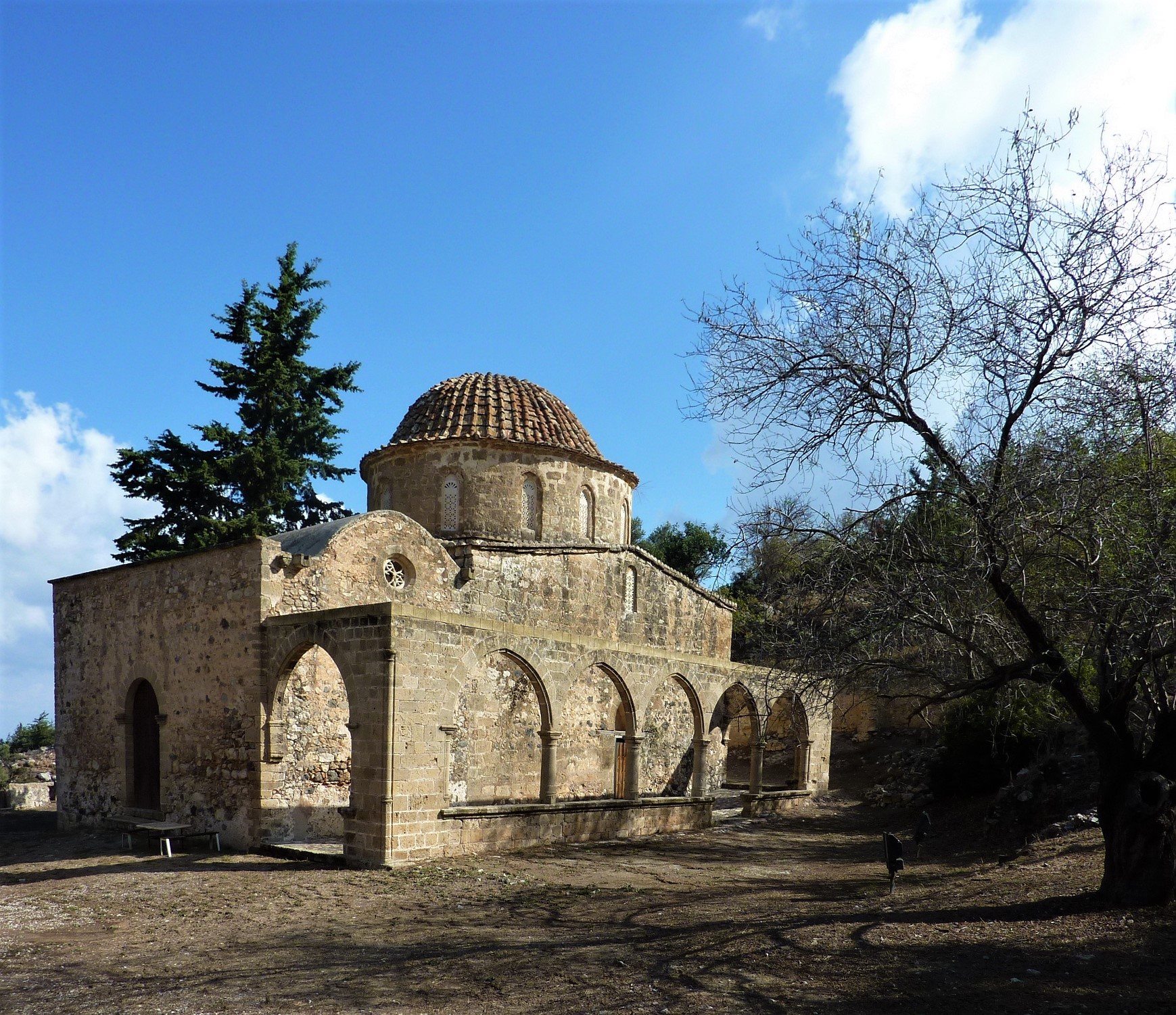
Church of Christ Antiphonitis, 2014.

Antiphonitis – more correctly the Church of Christ Antiphonitis (Χριστός Ἀντιφωνητής) – is a domed church in Cyprus, in Kyrenia District, located in the mountains near the village of Kalograia. It is reached from the network of tracks and small roads in the area of the Herbarium and Agios Amvrosios. It is under the de facto control of Northern Cyprus.

The name Christ Antiphonitis means "Christ who responds" and a number of Greek churches are so designated. The epithet appears to derive from a miraculous icon of some kind which responded to prayers, but no account of this icon in Cyprus is known. The name is testified in the late medieval period. Writing in the sixteenth century, Stefano Lusignan in his Description de toute l'isle de Cypre (Paris, 1580) recalls that Antifoniti was a fief belonging to his family, that his maternal grandmother Isabella Perez Fabricius founded the monastery of Antifonite and that his brother John (who had become a monk under the name Hilarion) died there.

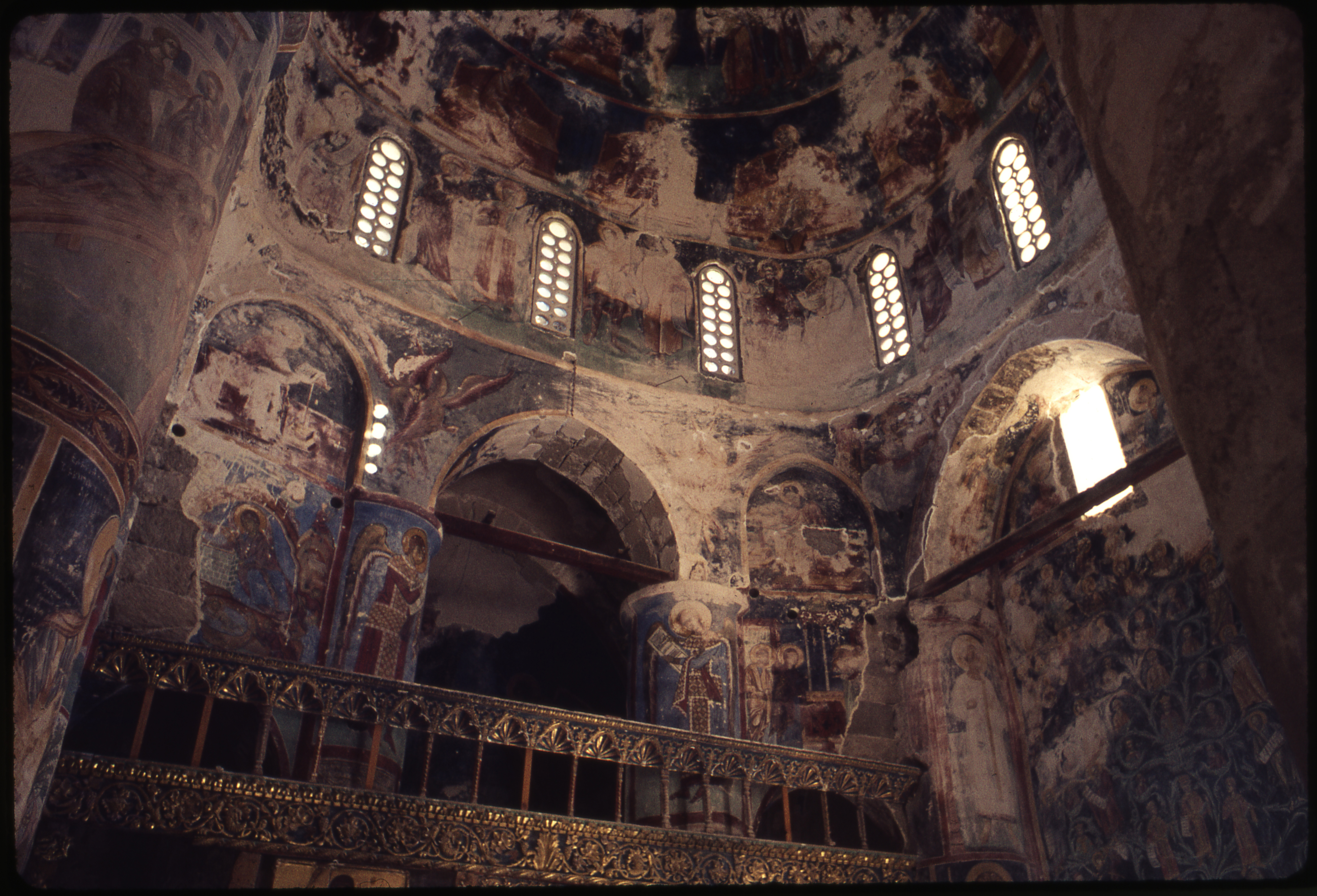
Church of Christ Antiphonitis, interior looking south east, as the monument stood in 1973

== Architecture ==
The church—built on the site of a natural spring at the head of a valley—was constructed in the twelfth century and belonged originally to a Greek Orthodox monastery. It consists of a single building with a spacious dome carried on eight pillars and is the only surviving example of this type in Cyprus. A ruined and partly restored example is in Saint Hilarion Castle and there was once a similar church at the centre of the Monastery of St. John Chrysostomos at Koutsovendis before the church there was rebuilt at the end of the nineteenth century. The narthex on the western side and the arcade on the south were added a later time, probably in the fifteenth century when the building was under the Latin church. The irregular shape of the dome is perhaps due to damaged sustained during the 1222 Cyprus earthquake.

== Paintings ==
The Church of Christ Antiphonitis is notable for the array of frescoes on the walls and on the pillars. The oldest paintings belong to the end of the twelfth century and are thought to be a local interpretation of the style of the late Comnenian period as it appears at Panagia tou Arakou at Lagoudera.

When first studied, the Virgin Mary and prelates in the apse were damaged, but the saints in the sanctuary were well preserved. Early painting also include decons, martyrs and stylites. There was a Baptism on the south-west pillar of the nave.

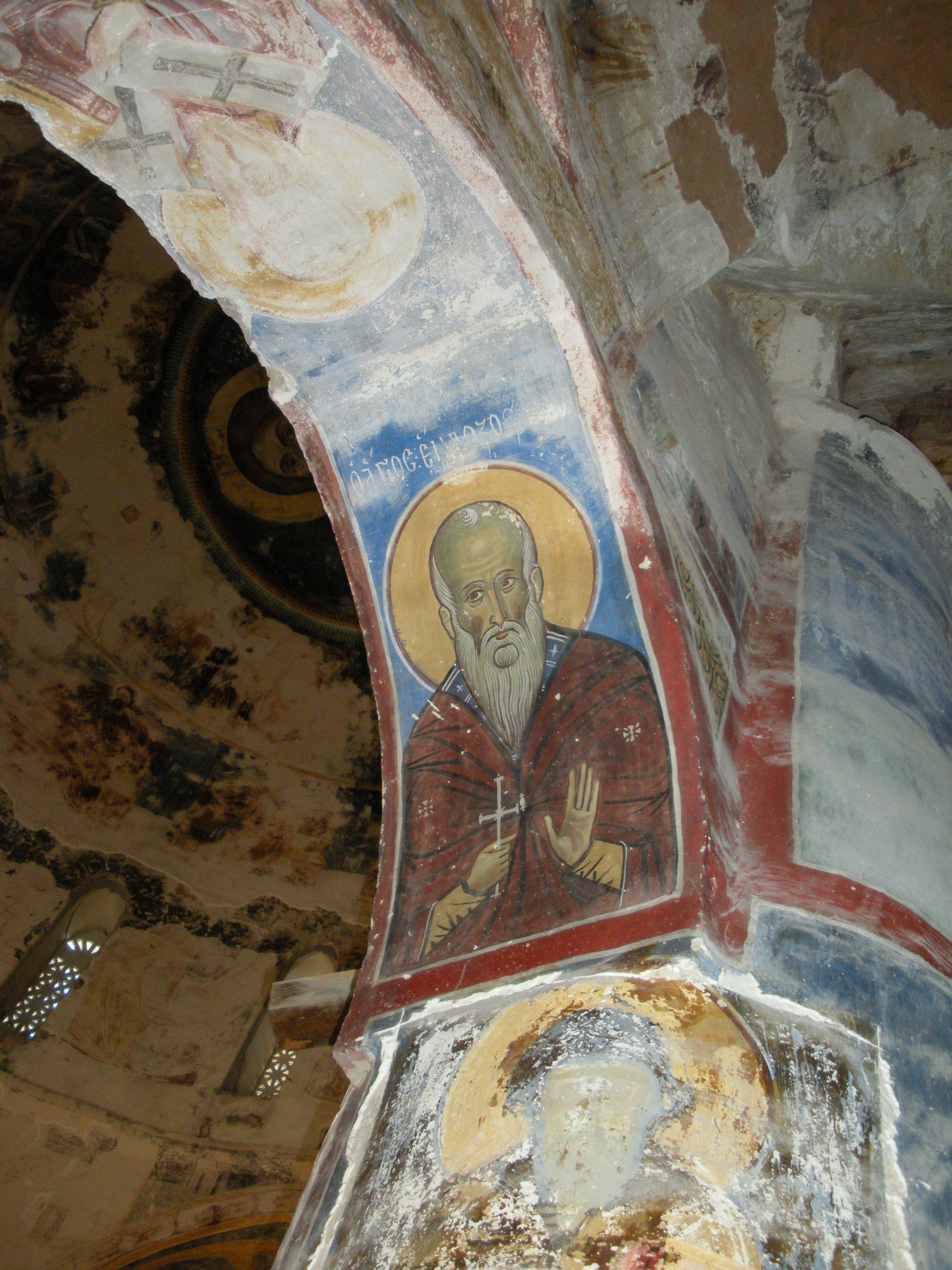
Church of Christ Antiphonitis, St. Endoxus in one the arches under the dome, twelfth century, as photographed in 2010.

The remaining paintings are later in date and belong to the 1400s. They are executed in a post-Byzantine local revival style. On the south wall was a Tree of Jesse, and on the north an elaborate Last Judgement or Μέλλουσα Κρίση. In the dome is Christ Pantocrator surround by angels. A. and J. Stylianou report that the paintings of the dome were already "badly damaged" at the time of their studies in the 1960s and 1970s.

The paintings in the narthex are faded due to sunlight, but include a notably large depiction of St. George.

Some time after 1975, some of the fresco paintings were stolen and sold on the international art market. The Last Judgement has been badly damaged, and the heads of the twelfth-century angels in the apse damaged and partly removed. The Tree of Jesse has also been removed.

== Iconostasis and icons ==
Writing in the 1930s, Rupert Gunnis noted the iconostasis painted in blue and gold, the doors of which are dated 1650, thus during the reign of Mehmed IV when the tax burden appears to have been lightened. The majority of the icons were of the seventeenth century with one of the Archangel Michael dated 1659.

The iconostasis was removed after 1975 and some individual icons panels from it were found with a private collector in the Netherlands. The Government of Cyprus engaged in legal action to secure their restitution. Four icons were repatriated in September, 2013. Separately, an icon from the church showing the Virgin Mary and dating to the fifteenth century was located in Athens and returned to Cyprus on 14 September 1998.

== Graffiti ==
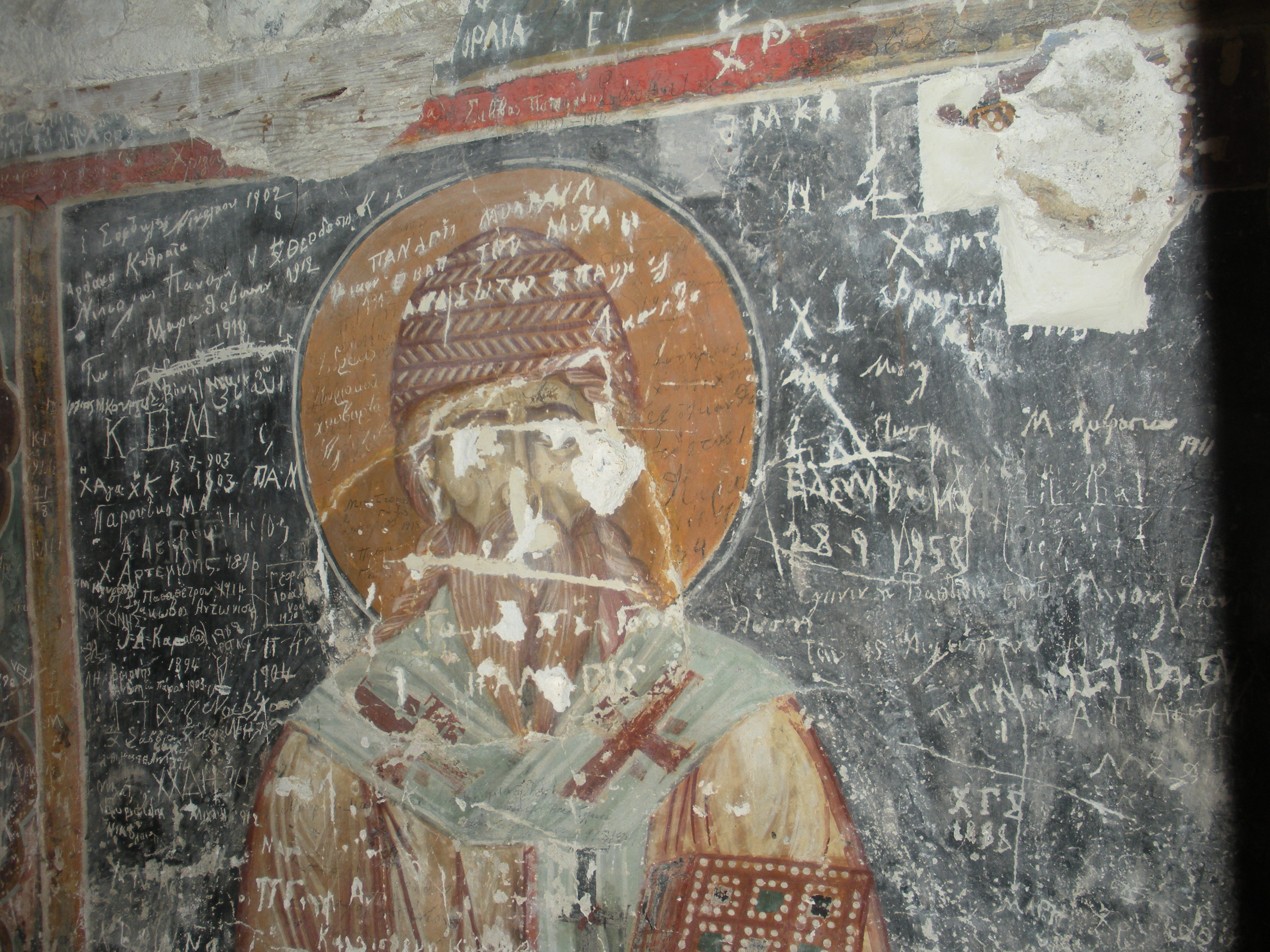
Church of Christ Antiphonitis, fresco of the twelfth century with later graffiti and pilgrim records, as photographed in 2010.

The church is notable for the graffiti and pilgrim records scratched into the lower frescoes during the eighteenth, nineteenth and twentieth centuries. They are predominantly in Greek but a few are also in the Ottoman Turkish alphabet. They are unique documents of popular history, telling us about the ordinary Cypriots who visited the building. Among the dates visible are 1803, 1888, 1891, 1896, 1902, 1903, 1904, 1910, 1911, 1919, 1930 and 1958.

== Jurisdiction ==
In the 1930s, the Church of Christ Antiphonitis was the property of Kykkos Monastery.

Presently it is classed as a museum and appears in the List of museums in Northern Cyprus.

Antiphonitis monastery (Ιερά Μονή Αρχαγγέλου Αντιφωνητού) is listed as monastery of Church of Cyprus on its official website.
