= Dervish Pasha Mansion =

Museum in Nicosia, Cyprus

Coordinates: 35.1764°N 33.3585°E

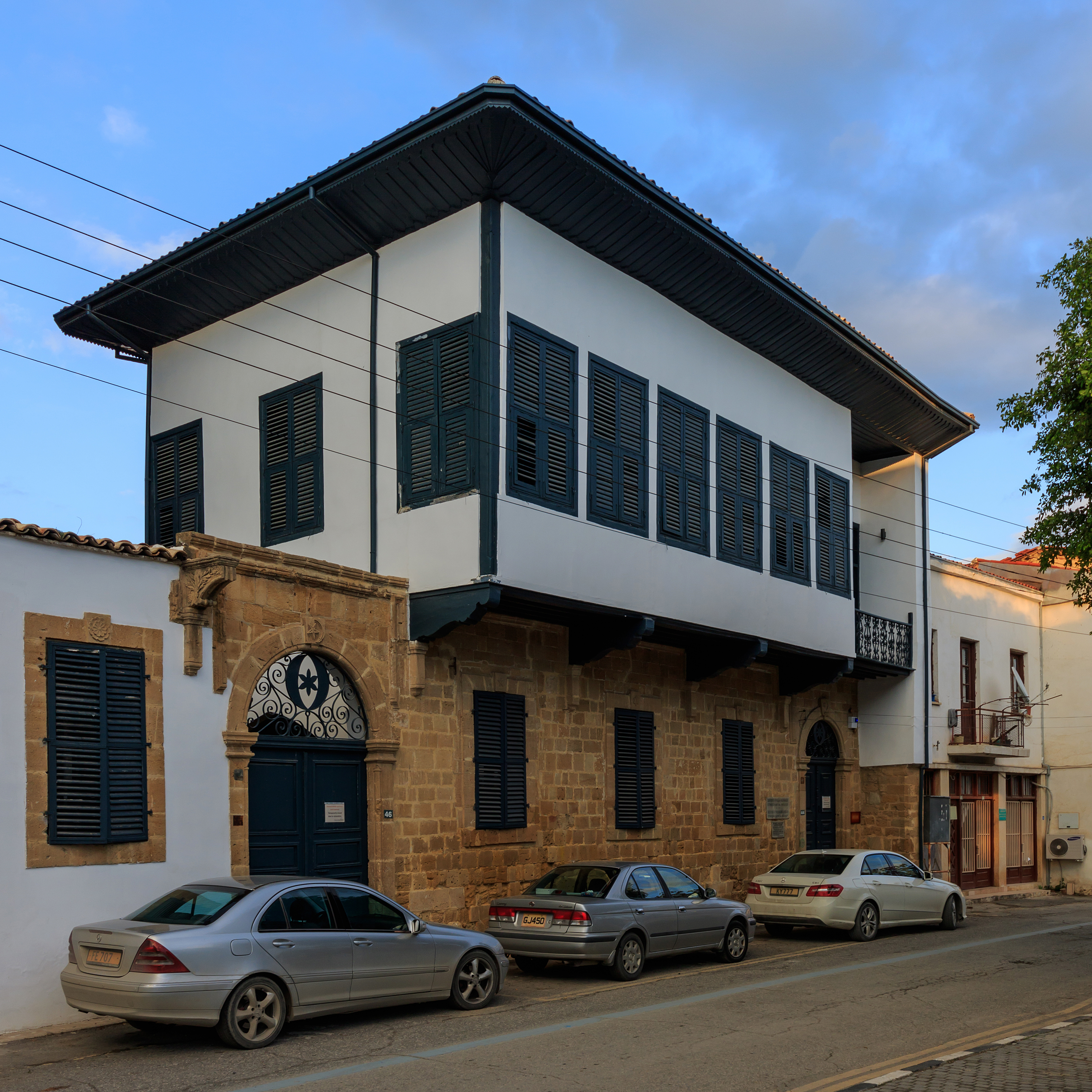
In 2017

Dervish Pasha Mansion (Turkish: Derviş Paşa Konağı) is a historical mansion and ethnographic museum in the Arab Ahmet quarter of Nicosia, currently located in North Nicosia. It lies on the Beliğ Paşa Street and has two floors. It is considered to be one of the finest examples of Ottoman architecture in Cyprus.

The current mansion was built on an earlier Gothic building on the same site. Its front door bears the date of 1801 inscribed on it, implying that this was the date of construction of the building. It was repaired in 1869, with the ornate wood carvings on the ceiling being dated to this year. It belonged at the end of the 19th century to Hacı Ahmet Derviş Efendi, a wealthy Turkish Cypriot who owned large swathes of land outside the walled city of Nicosia.

The lower floor is made of stone and the upper floor is made of adobe. Its architecture carries a heavy Ottoman character and reflects the Ottoman lifestyle of the time. It has two entrance doors, historically, one was for men (selamlik) and one was for women (harem). It has a large inner courtyard, which was used by the household members for relaxation without exposure to the outside. A bay window at the upper floor was built in the Baghdadi style.

In 1979, the mansion was in the danger of collapse. It was purchased by the Turkish Cypriot state in 1981 and following a renovation, opened to visitors as an ethnographic museum on 21 March 1988. It is notable as the first significant renovation project in Northern Cyprus. In the mansion, assets of traditional Cypriot lifestyle, such as kitchen utensils, instruments for needlework, as well as old swords and historical clothes are on display.

== Gallery ==
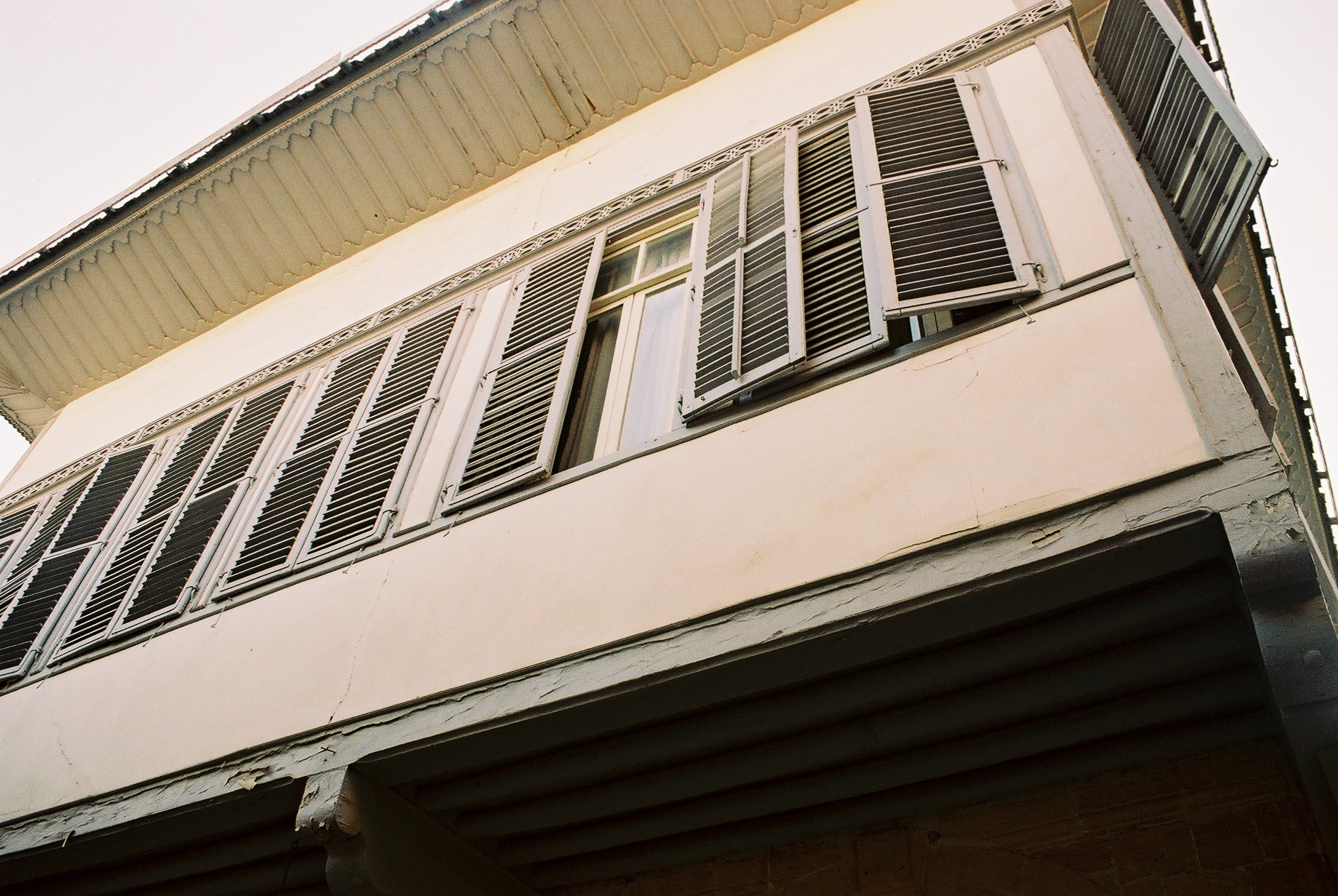

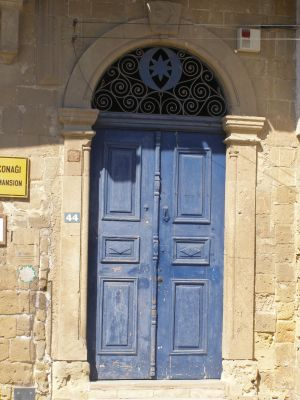

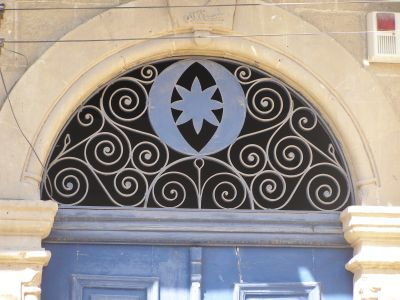

== See also ==
- Hadjigeorgakis Kornesios Mansion
