= Yeni Jami, Nicosia =

Yeni Jami
- Γενί Τζαμί (Greek) Yenicami (Turkish)
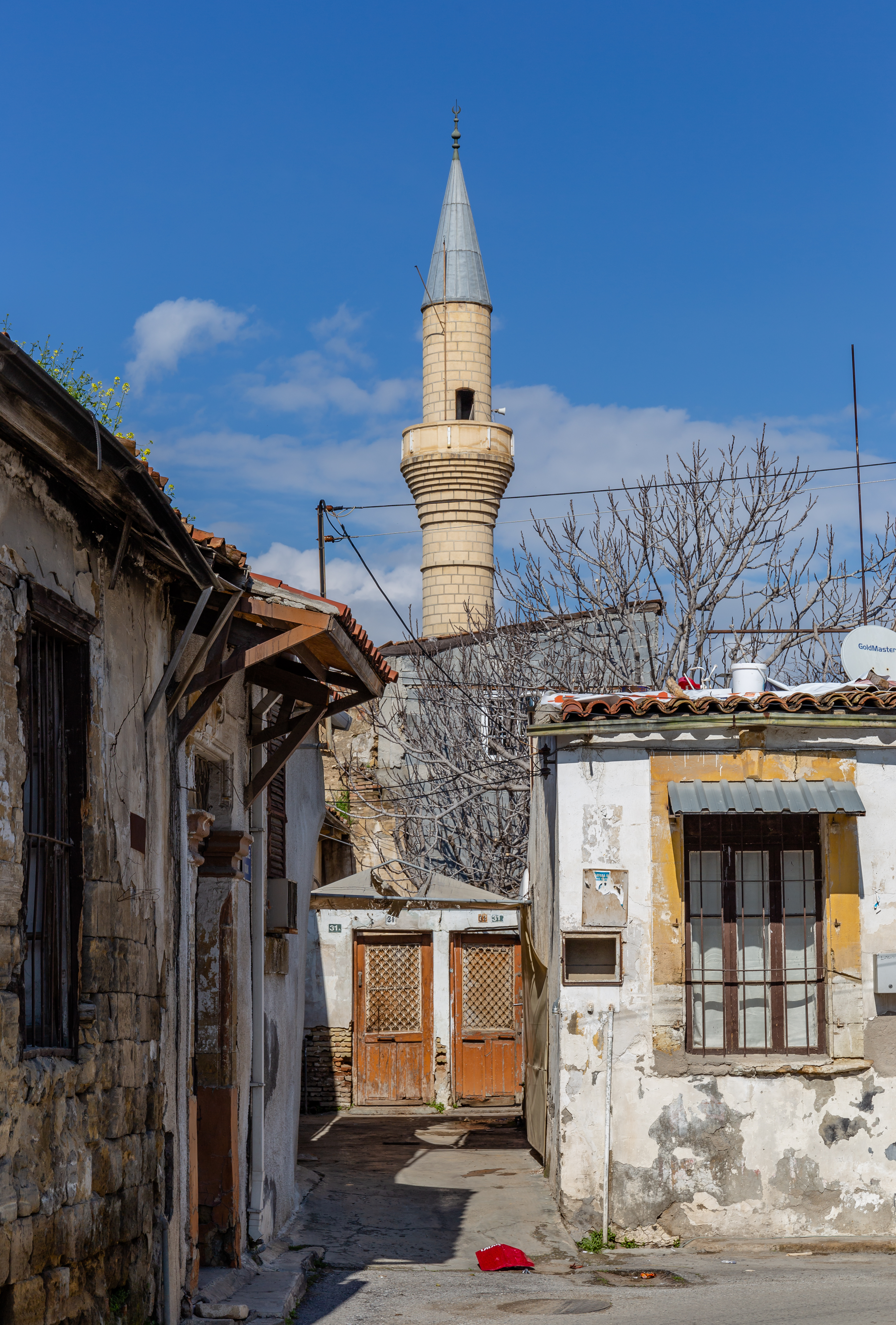
- Yeni Cami Mosque

- Location in Cyprus
- Coordinates: 35°10′43″N 33°21′58″E
- Country: Cyprus
- District: Nicosia District
- Municipality: Nicosia

Population (2011)
  - Total: 3,185
- Time zone: UTC+2 (EET)
  - Summer (DST): UTC+3 (EEST)

Yeni Jami is a Neighbourhood, Quarter, Mahalla or Parish of Nicosia, Cyprus and the mosque situated therein after which the Quarter is named. It is spelled Yenicami in Turkish and Γενί Τζαμί in Greek and means "new mosque" in Turkish.

At the last Census (2011) it had a population of 3,185,. It covers the historic Yeni Jami neighbourhood in the north-east part of Nicosia within the walls, an area known as Çağlayan (Chaglayan) outside the walls near the Loredano bastion and a group of 12 streets just 200 metres east of the Loredano bastion extending to Paul Karolides Street (near Pallouriotissa Gymnasium). Architecture is typically Ottoman of the era of the conquest of the island in 1571. Constructed of yellow sandstone, the residential houses have arched entrances, inner courtyards where there is usually a kitchen garden, fruit trees and a freshwater reservouar. Unfortunately the recent years have seen the demolishing of quite a number of these buildings within the historic walls, after becoming a danger of collapse, due to lack of maintenance and or neglect.

The population in 1946 was 2,345, consisting of 1,686 Turkish Cypriots, 656 Greek Cypriots and 3 others

== History ==
It is one of the 24 historic Neighbourhoods of Nicosia within the walls. In 1923 it was extended to encompass an area outside the walls beyond the Loredano bastion up to the north-south road running parallel with the walls in the vicinity of Pallouriotissa

The new area beyond the walls was linked by the "Kaimakli Opening" to the original area within the walls. The area just beyond the walls received the name Chaglayan from the restaurant of Huseyin Chaglayan, grandfather of Hussein Chalayan

The eponymous new mosque was founded in the mid 18th century.

== Landmarks ==
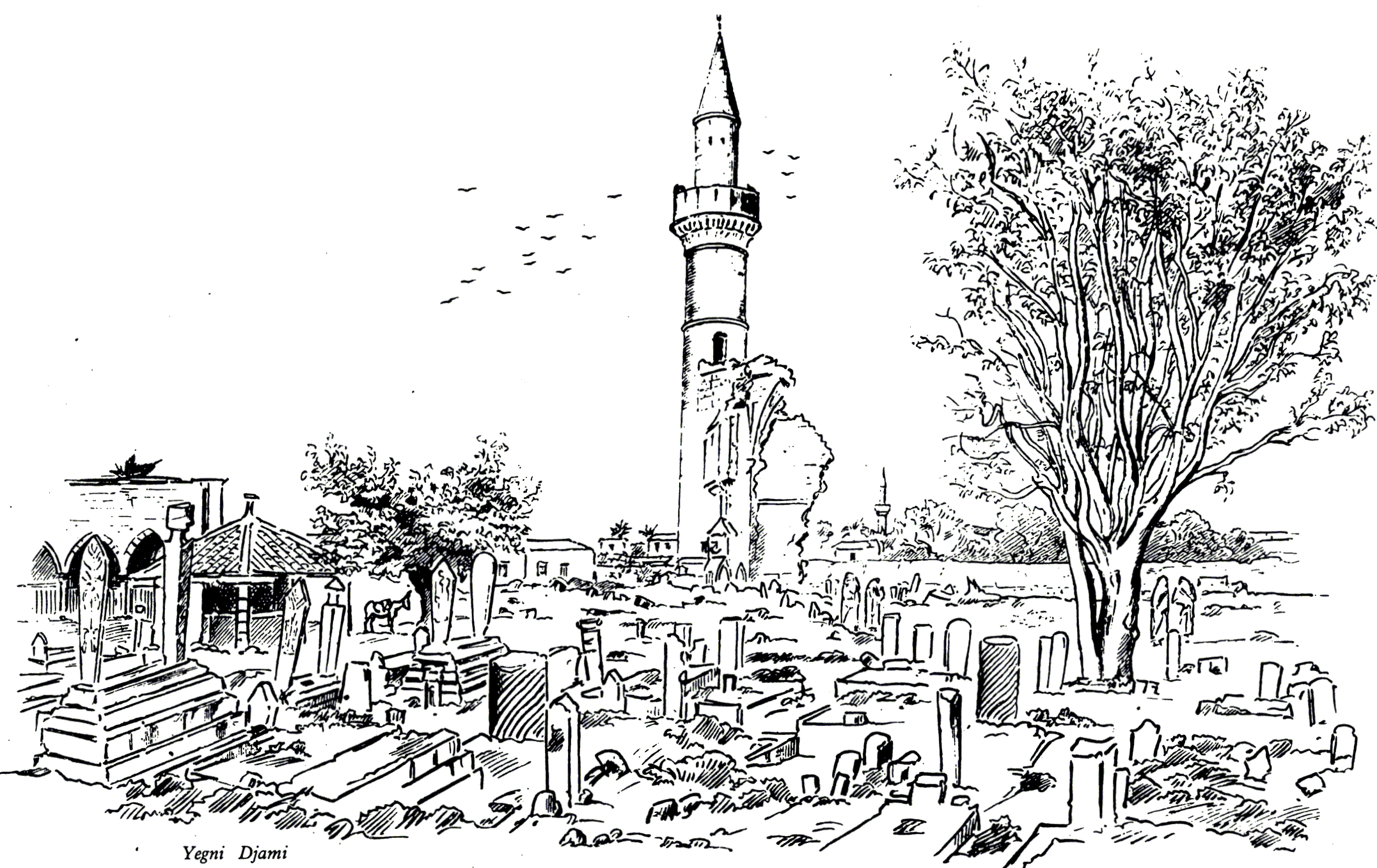
Yeni Jami ("new mosque") in the 1870s

This Neighbourhood takes its name from a new mosque built out of the ruins of a very beautiful and interesting medieval church. The mosque is a square building occupying the south east corner of an old Moslem burial ground. About in the centre of the cemetery stands a block of ruins consisting of the south-west angle of the medieval church of which the turret staircase has been carried up as the minaret of the mosque, hence the preservation of the fragment. The surrounding burial ground is covered with ancient fragments used as tombstones.

There formerly stood in the same place an old mosque, previously a church, and part of the Gothic vault and minaret are still visible. In 1740 this Mosque was destroyed by a rapacious Pasha (Menteszade Haci Ismail Agha), who dreamt that a hidden treasure was to be found underneath it. The Turkish residents complained about this to the government in Constantinople, and the Pasha was consequently ordered to be executed. The Koubba by the side of the new mosque is his tomb.

Yeni Jami has a simple entrance hall formed of four Gothic arches, which also runs along the right side of the building as an open corridor; in front of it is a covered spring.

The original building was a Latin church, built in the fourteenth century, which was converted to a mosque in 1571, immediately after the Turkish conquest. Today very little remains of either the Latin church or the old mosque. The New Mosque was built some twenty metres away from the old building. It was constructed in the middle of the eighteenth century, a few years after the old one was demolished.

The ceiling of the mosque is supported by three arches. There is an inscription over the arched entrance door. The old minaret was demolished in 1979 because of its dangerous condition and a new minaret was then built by Evkaf, the historic Turkish religious foundation.

The other principal landmarks are the Loredano bastion, on the north east of the Nicosia walls and also the park which lies underneath it.

== Current division ==
The Yeni Jami Neighbourhood currently under the control of the government of Cyprus extends only to an area of 12 streets just a few yards east of the Loredano bastion, although for historic, registration and other purposes the government still recognises the wider bounds of the Neighbourhood. The Yeni Jami Neighbourhood of Nicosia Turkish Municipality only covers that part within the walls, while the area beyond the walls is organised as the separate Neighbourhood of Çağlayan (Chaglayan). This position is summarised below.

| Area | Population 2011 | % of total |
|---|---|---|
| Yeni Jami within walls | 1663 | 52.2% |
| Çağlayan | 1307 | 41.0% |
| Yeni Jami (Cyprus government sector) | 215 | 6.8% |
| TOTAL | 3185 | 100% |
