= Cyprus Classic Motorcycle Museum =

Coordinates: 35.1728°N 33.3583°E

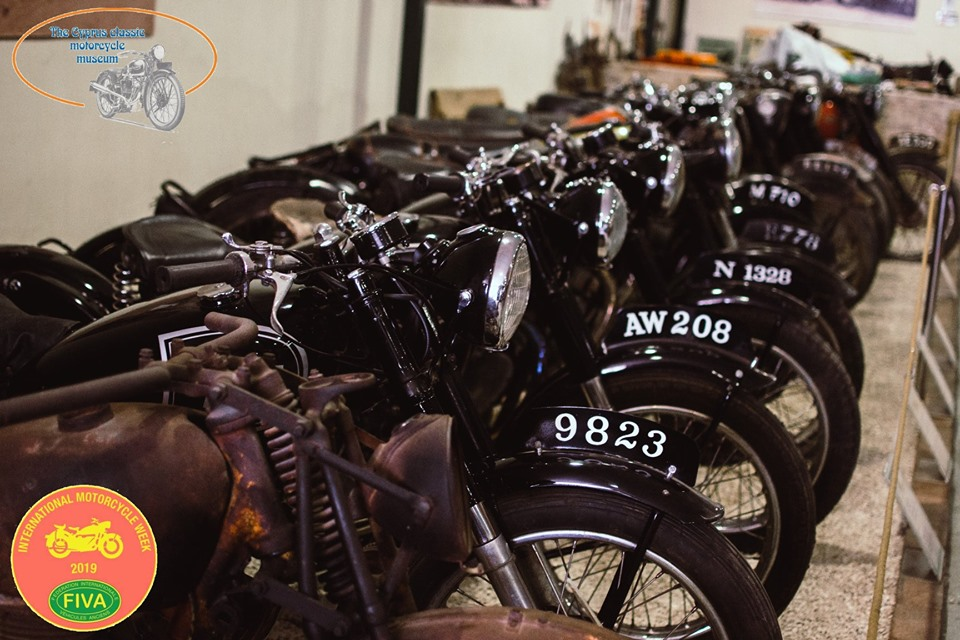

The Cyprus Classic Motorcycle Museum is a museum in Nicosia, the capital of Cyprus, dedicated to the history of motorcycles between 1914 and 1983. The collection consists of more than 400 motorcycles. Companies represented are AJS, MV Agusta, Matchless, Norton, BSA, Triumph, Ariel, BMW, James, Moto Guzzi, Royal Enfield and many more brands. The museum was created in 2000 by Andreas Nicolaou. It is the biggest motorcycle museum in the Middle East.

== Notable ownership and use of the motorcycles on display ==
UK - (BSA, Triumph, Ariel, Norton, Velocette, AJS, Matchless, Panther, Sunbeam, James, New Hudson, Royal Enfield) United States - (Harley Davidson, Indian) Japan - (Honda, Yamaha, Suzuki, Kawasaki) Germany - (BMW, NSU, MZ, Simson) Spain - (Derbi, Montesa, Bultaco, Gas Gas) Italy - (MV Agusta, Ducati, Negrini, Moto Morini, Benelli, Lambretta, Vespa) Russia - (Ural, Muravei, Minsk)

- Three Cyprus Police motorcycles which had been used by the Presidential Guard of Archbishop Makarios.
- The motorcycle of EOKA (Ethniki Organosis Kyprion Agoniston or in English National Organisation of Cypriot Fighters) fighter Stylianos Lenas which was used for carrying weaponry and ammunition.
- The motorcycle of the first champion in Cyprus (1970–1973) namely the Turkish Cypriot Zeki Isa.
- Military motorcycles used by the army during the Second World War.
