= Ethnographic Museum of Cyprus =

Cypriot museum

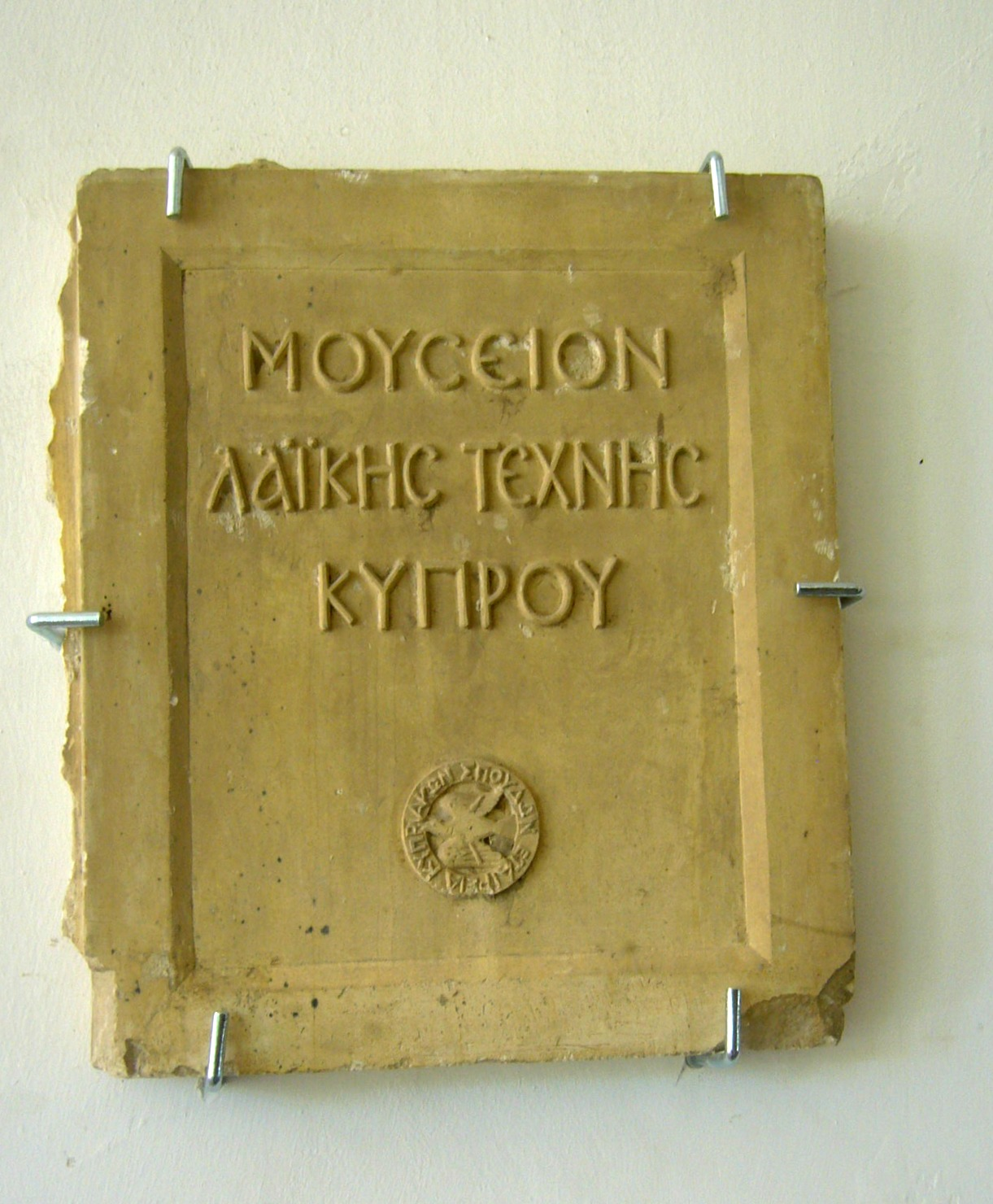
Nicosia, Cyprus Folk Art Museum, entrance plaque with the emblem of the Society of Cypriot Studies

The Cyprus Folk Art Museum (Greek: Μουσείο Λαικής Τέχνης Κύπρου, romanized: Mouseío Laikís Téchnis Kýprou) is a museum in Cyprus dedicated to the country's ethnographic history. The museum is located in Nicosia directly beside the Cathedral of Agios Ioannis Evangelistis, the Byzantine Museum of Cyprus, the National Struggle Museum, and the current Archbhishop's Palace. The square beside the cathedral and museum is named after Kyprianos of Cyprus who was executed by the Ottomans in 1821 for his support of the Greek Revolution. Facing the museum and cathedral is the Pancyprian Gymnasium, founded in 1812 by Kyprianos and is the oldest educational institution in Cyprus. During the 1990s the name of the museum was changed to the Ethnographic Museum for a short period. The museum is a non-profit cultural organisation and has depended on volunteers since it was founded in 1937.

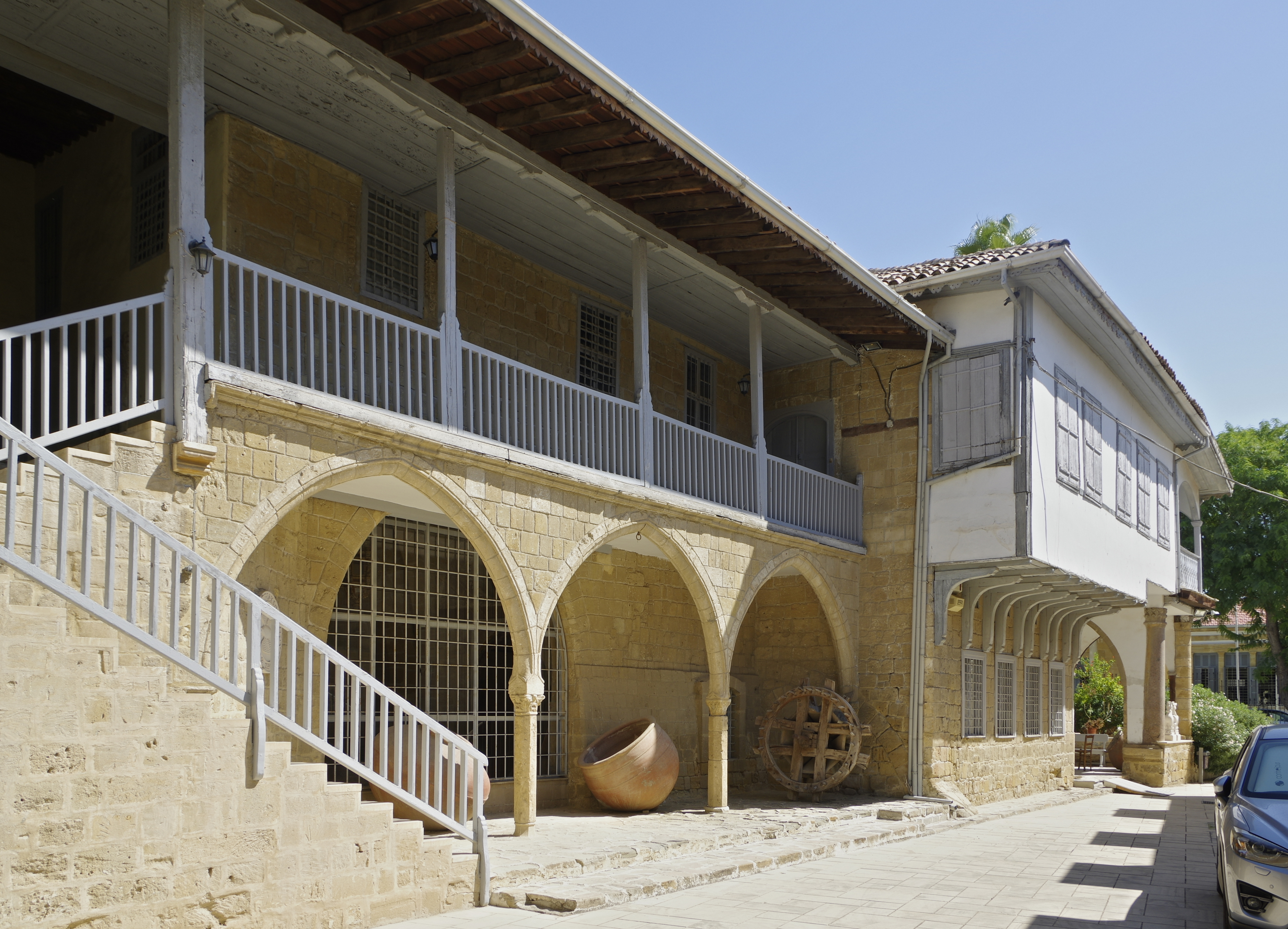
Nicosia, Cyprus Folk Art Museum

== Collections ==
The Collections, over 5000 items, include examples of Cypriot folk art from the 19th and 20th centuries, including woodcarvings, embroidery, pottery, and national costumes. The collection has grown through donation and purchase, is in some cases directly from the villagers who had the items at the time. Among the private collections in this museum are those of the late Maria Eleutheriou Gaffiero and the late G. Filis.

Important objects include the door of St. Mamas in Morphou, dating from the 19th century. This inspired the famous poet Giorgos Seferis who refers to the little owl on the door in his poem "Little things of Cyprus". The poem is dedicated to his friend and first director of the Museum, Adamantios Diamantis (1900–1994).

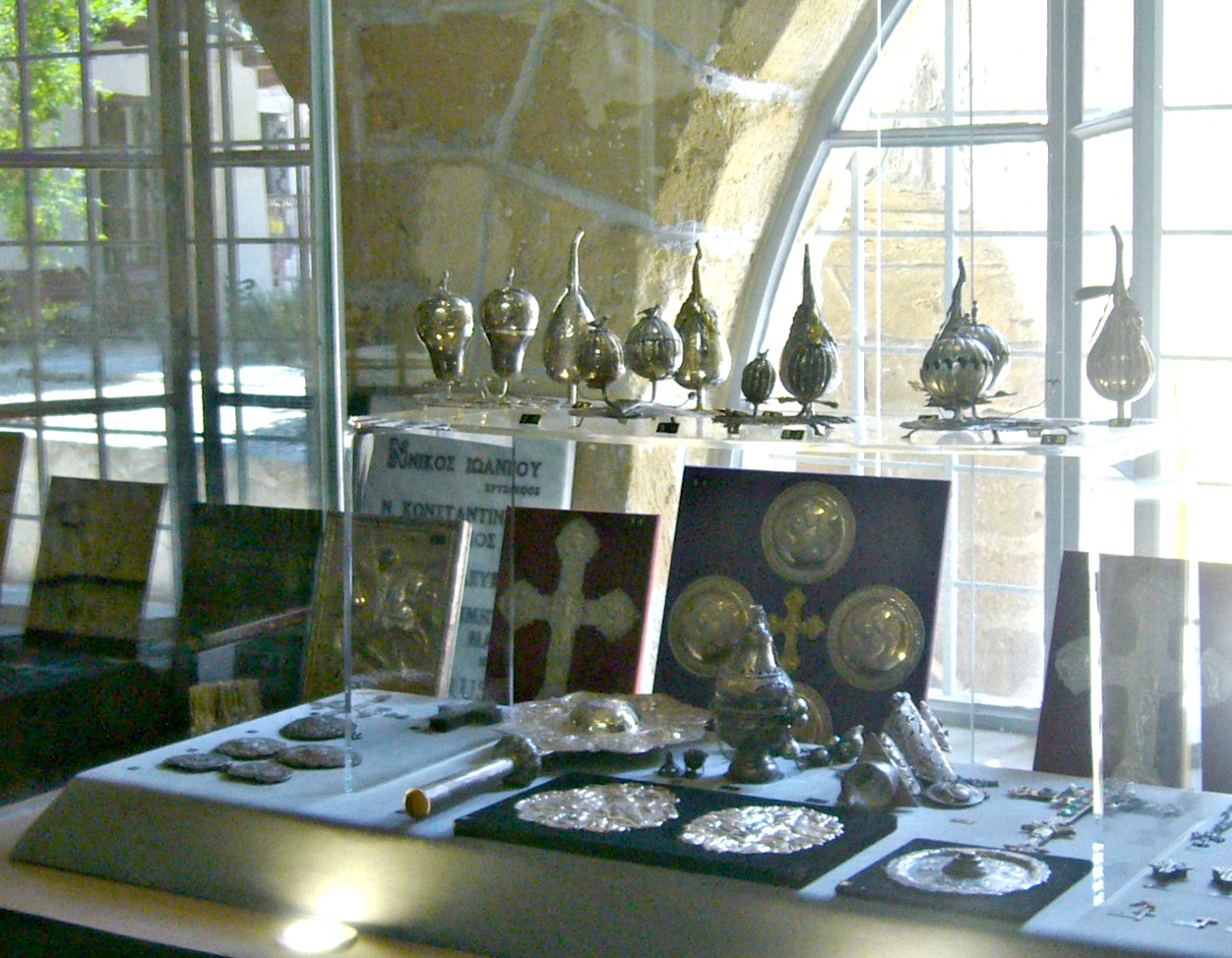
Nicosia, Cyprus Folk Art Museum, display of liturgical items.

Another important document of popular culture is a wall painting from the coffee shop in the village of Geri, Cyprus, 10 kilometres south-east of Nicosia. It depicts Athanasios Diakos, a well-known hero in the Greek War of Independence.

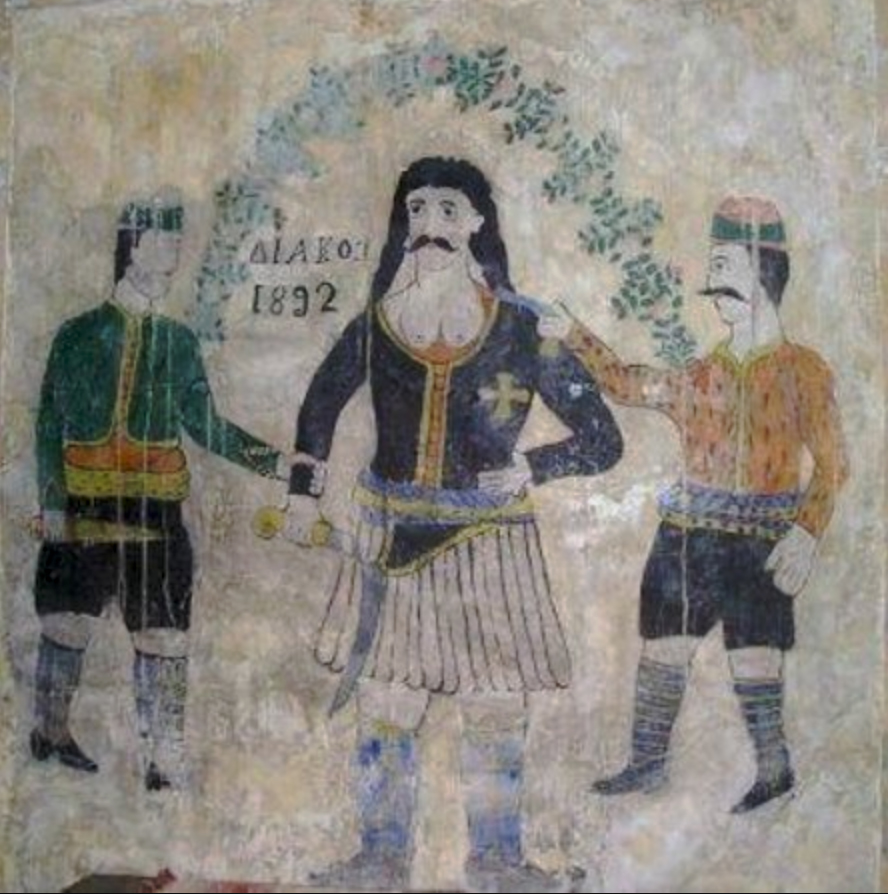
Nicosia, Cyprus Folk Art Museum, painting of Athanasios Diakos from the village of Geri.

== History of the museum ==
The Cyprus Folk Art Museum was founded by members of the Society of Cypriot Studies in 1937 and housed in the premises of the Archbishop's Palace. With the construction of a new seat for the Archbishop of Cyprus in 1961, the Society approached the Archbishop, who graciously handed over the whole of the Old Archbishopric to the Society for its activities. From 1962 to 1964 extensive reconstruction of the building was carried out at great expense to the Society with the help of Archbishop Makarios III. In its early days, the museum was forced to close on three occasion during the 1955–1959 troubles. In 1974, the museum closed again for over a year as a result of the invasion of the Turkish Army at which time collections were removed for safe keeping. Subsequently, the roof of the building was in urgent need of repair and work carried out from 1990 after Archbishop Chrysostomos offered to cover the expenses. New exhibitions opened to the public in April 1996 on completion of the renovations. In June 1999, the silk industry exhibitions were inaugurated in the first floor of the building.

== History of the building ==
The museum site has a long and important history. In the 13th century, the area was controlled by the Lusignan rulers and a monastery constructed to provide a home for the order of the Benedictines. Their church was dedicated by Saint John of Bibi (St John the Evangelist). The Benedictines left Cyprus after 1426 when Barsbay, the Mamluk sultan of Egypt, subjugated the island. The monastery then passed to the hands of the Greek Orthodox Church. The Greek church renovated the monastic buildings in a series of campaigns in the 15th and 16th centuries, a notable addition being a richly decorated arch with chevron mouldings. Above the inner Gothic-style door is a 16th-century fresco of the Annunciation, which bears the end of a Greek inscription. This was uncovered in 1950 and the fresco was conserved in 1995 by the Society and the Department of Antiquities. The building continued to be refurbished and developed in the 17th and 18th centuries, with earlier capitals and other architectural parts incorporated into the structure. Archbishop Kyprianos was actually taken from a room in the building to the place of his execution. On the first floor there is the room which was used by him and is known by his name.

== Hours of operation ==
The museum is open Tuesday to Friday 9.00 to 16.00 and Saturday from 9.00-13.00. The entrance charge is €2.00.
