= Cyprus Museum of Natural History =

Cyprus museum

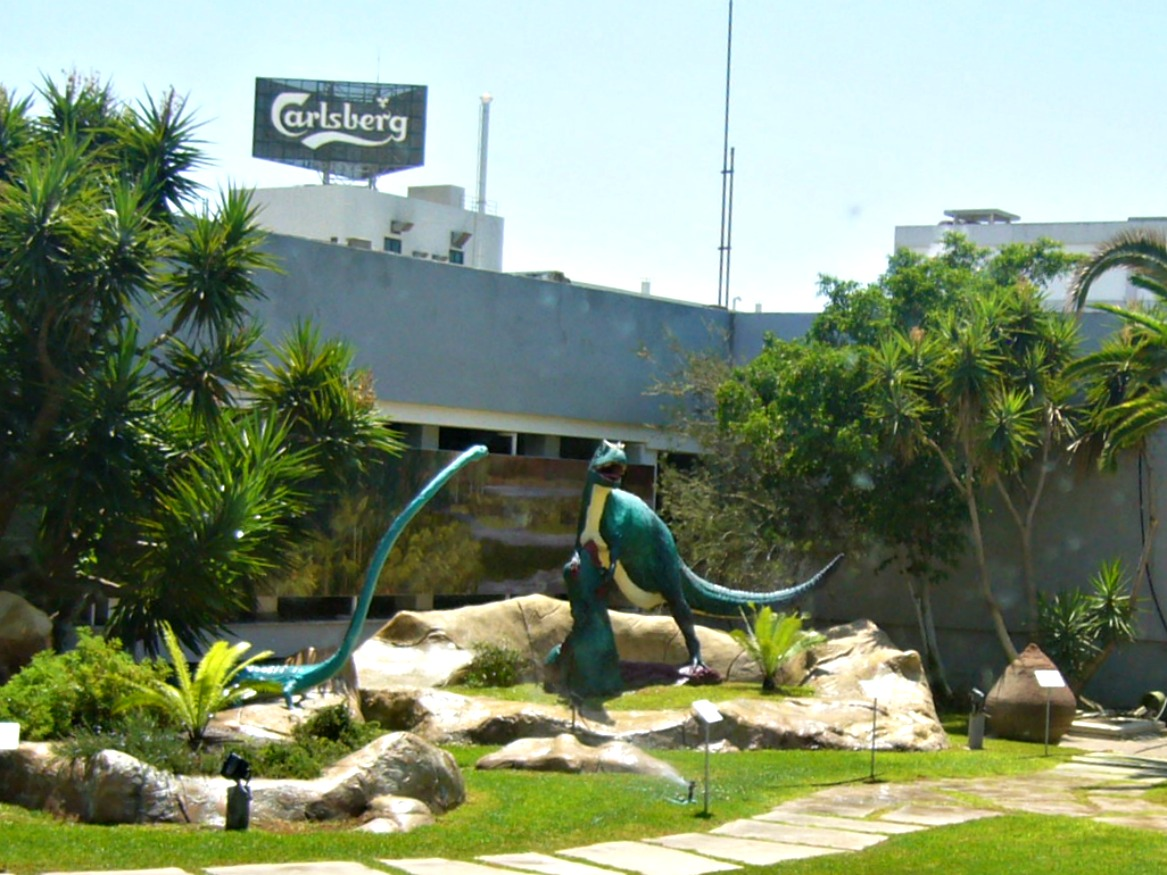
- Established: 1996
- Location: Nicosia, Cyprus
- Type: Natural history museum
- Website: natmuseum.org.cy/index-en.html

The Cyprus Museum of Natural History (Greek: Κυπριακό Μουσείο Φυσικής Ιστορίας, romanized: Kypriakó Mouseío Fysikís Istorías) is a natural history museum on the outskirts of Nicosia, Cyprus.

The museum was founded by the Photos Photiades Charity, Scientific and Cultural Foundation, and is the largest museum of its kind in Cyprus. Its approximately 2,500 exhibits include various embalmed animals including mammals, birds, fish, reptiles, and insects. It also includes rocks, minerals, semi-precious stones, shells, and fossils, showcasing the region's geological history and evolution over millions of years.
