= Hadjigeorgakis Kornesios Mansion =

Architecture of the last century of Ottoman rule, Nicosia, Cyprus (built 1793)

Coordinates: 35.171938°N 33.3669°E

Hadjigeorgakis Kornesios mansion
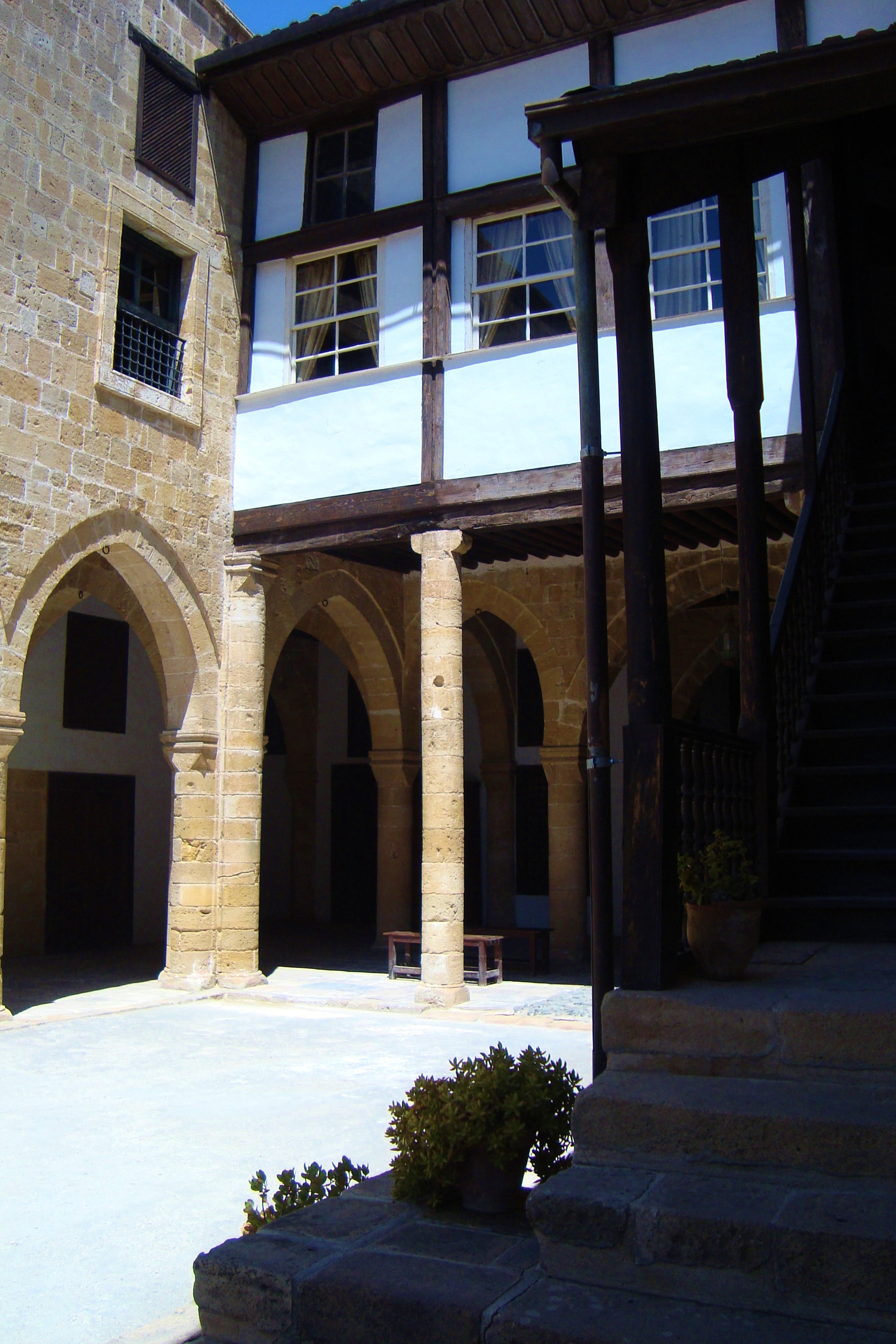
- Hadjigeorgakis Kornesios Mansion
- Established: 1793 (house); 1960 (museum)
- Location: 20 Patriarchou Grigoriou Street, Nicosia, Cyprus
- Owner: Department of Antiquities (Cyprus)
- Website: www.mcw.gov.cy

The Hadjigeorgakis Kornesios Mansion, also known as Konak, and today the Cyprus Ethnological Museum is an historic building in Nicosia (also known as Lefkosia), Cyprus.

== History ==
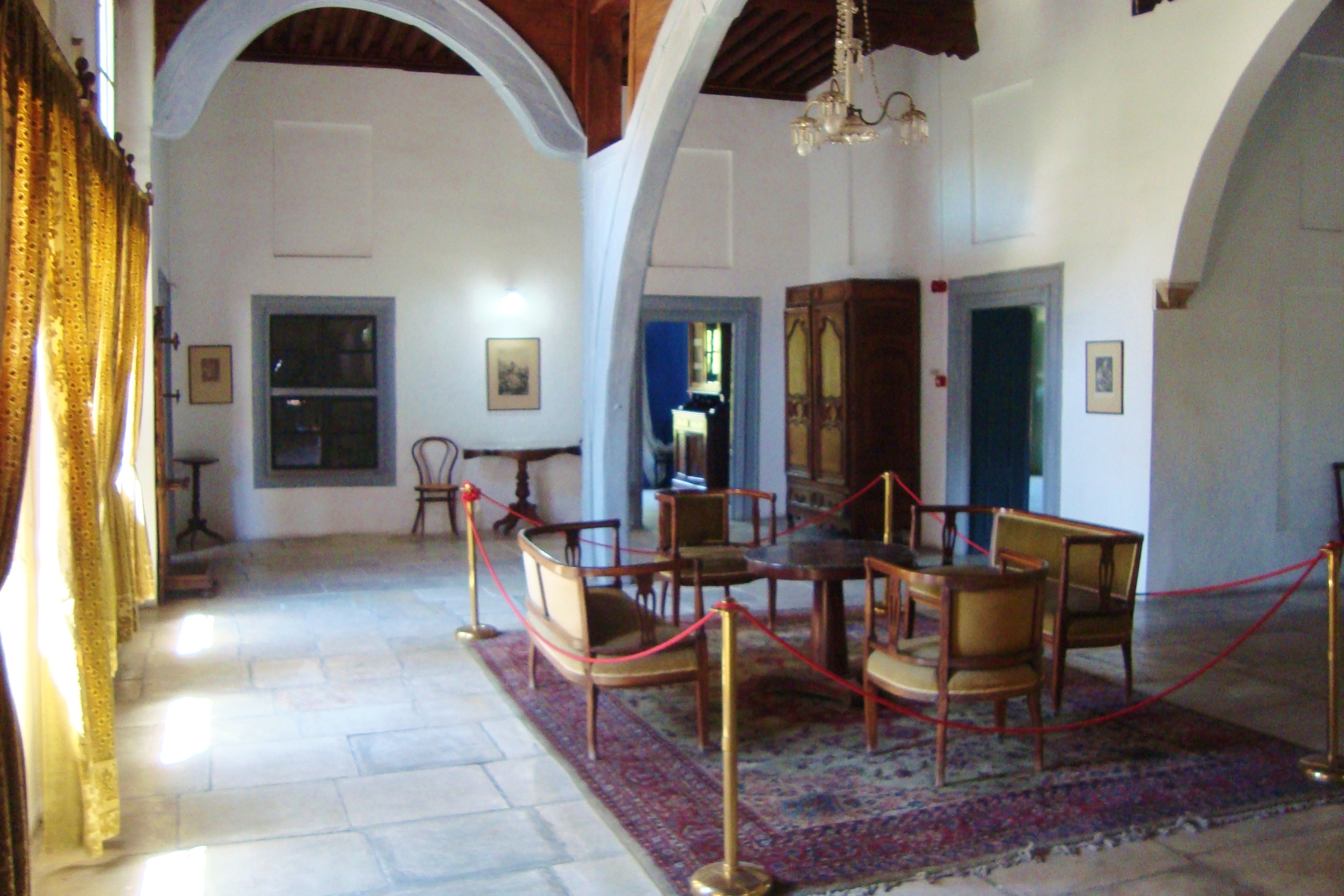
Living room of the house

The owner of the mansion, Hadjigeorgakis Kornesios, was a dragoman, the official interpreter for the Divan (Council) of the Sultan for thirty years from 1779. This title, which was one of the most prestigious titles given to the local Christians by the Ottoman authorities, gave the opportunity to Kornesios to accumulate huge wealth and power. His power brought jealousy to his enemies, who cunningly managed to have him beheaded on 31 March 1809 in Constantinople (modern day Istanbul).

The house was built in 1793.

After the house was extensively renovated, the work was awarded the Europa Nostra prize for cultural heritage in 1988.

It opened on 3 May 1960 with the aid of public subscription, three years after a foundation was established to protect the property from developers who wanted to demolish the block.

== Architecture ==
The mansion is the most important example of urban architecture of the last century of Ottoman rule that survives in old Nicosia. It was built in 1793 with local bloc-cut sandstone and is a two-storey building.

The monogram of the owner and the date of its erection can be seen on a marble tablet inside the entrance. The architectural plan of the building in the form of a Greek "Π" surrounds a central garden with a fountain and a private bathhouse (Hammam) which has three rooms. On the ground floor the servants’ quarters and the kitchen were situated. Roofed wooden stairs with a stone base lead to the entrance hall on the first floor from the courtyard. The official reception room and the living areas communicated with this reception hall. The official reception room (the onda), at the end of the east wing, differs from the other rooms with its exceptional carved wooden, gilded and painted decoration, which liken it to other official reception rooms in many mansions of the Ottoman Empire.

== Today ==
Today the mansion functions as the Ethnological Museum (House of Hadjigeorgakis Kornesios). The address is: 20 Patriarchou Grigoriou St, Nicosia.

== Gallery ==
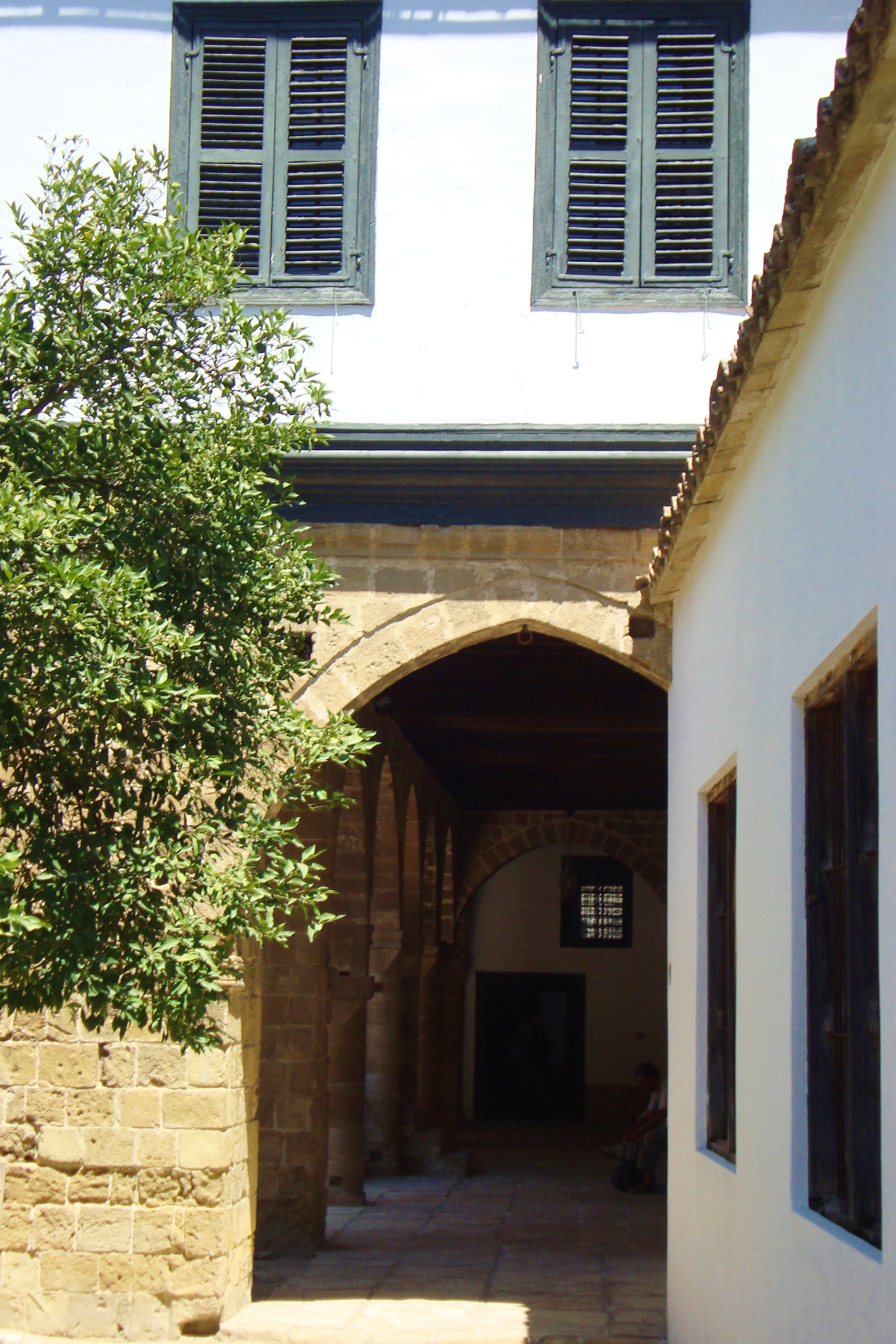
Gardens of the mansion

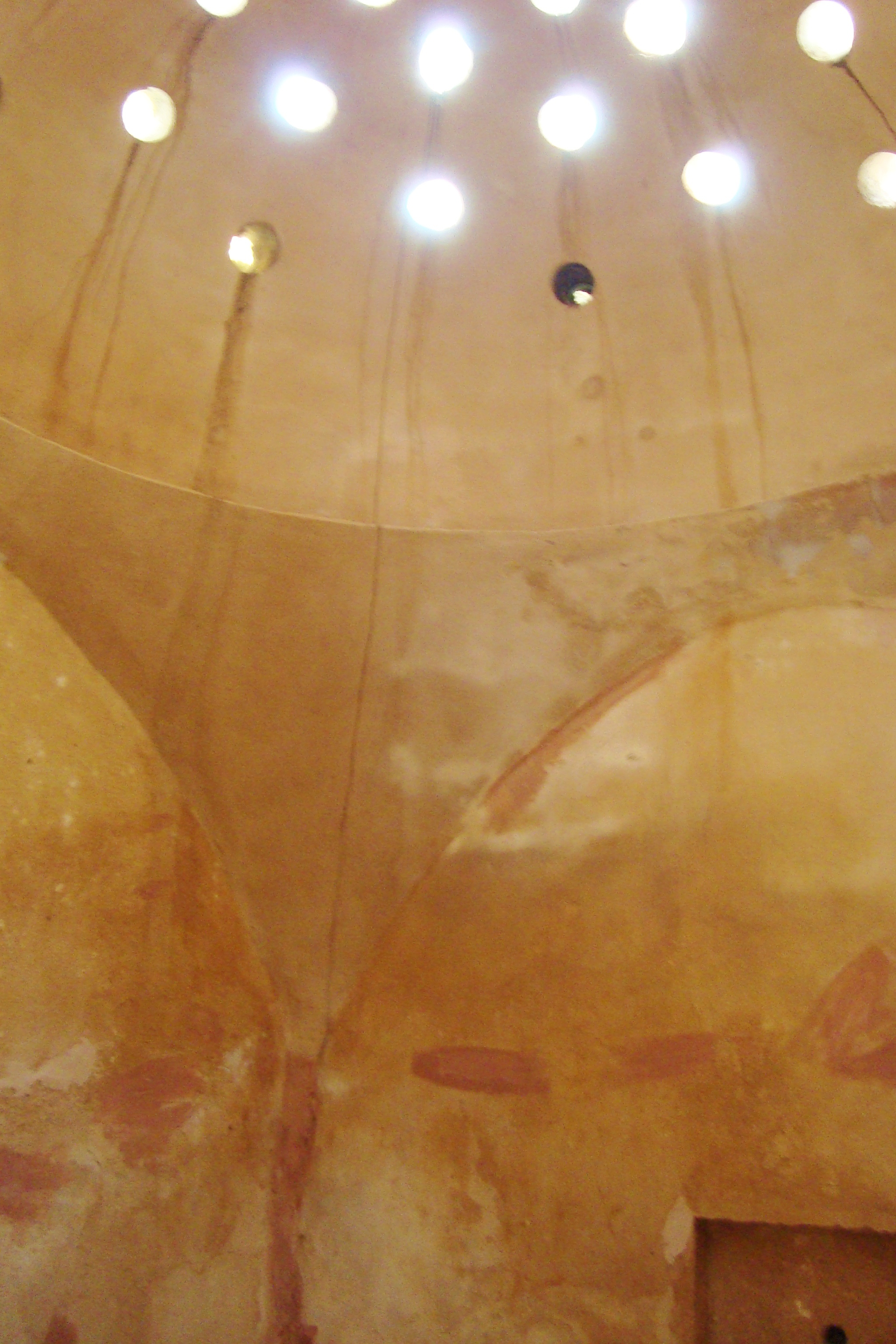
Old Hamam of the mansion

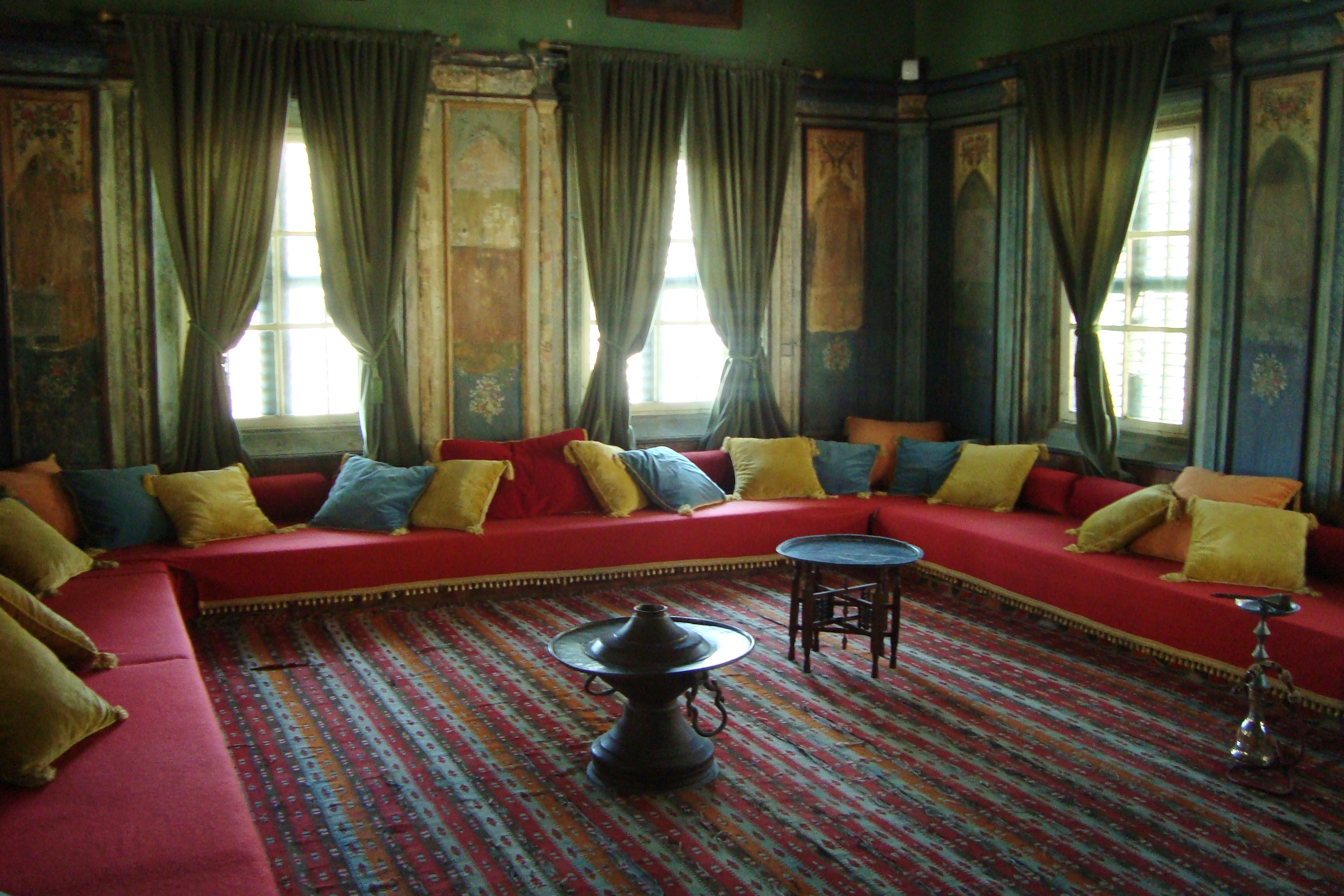
Sitting room of the Dragoman

== See also ==
- Dervish Pasha Mansion
- Tourism in Cyprus
- History of Cyprus
