= Administrative divisions of Nicosia =

Overview of Nicosia administrative divisions

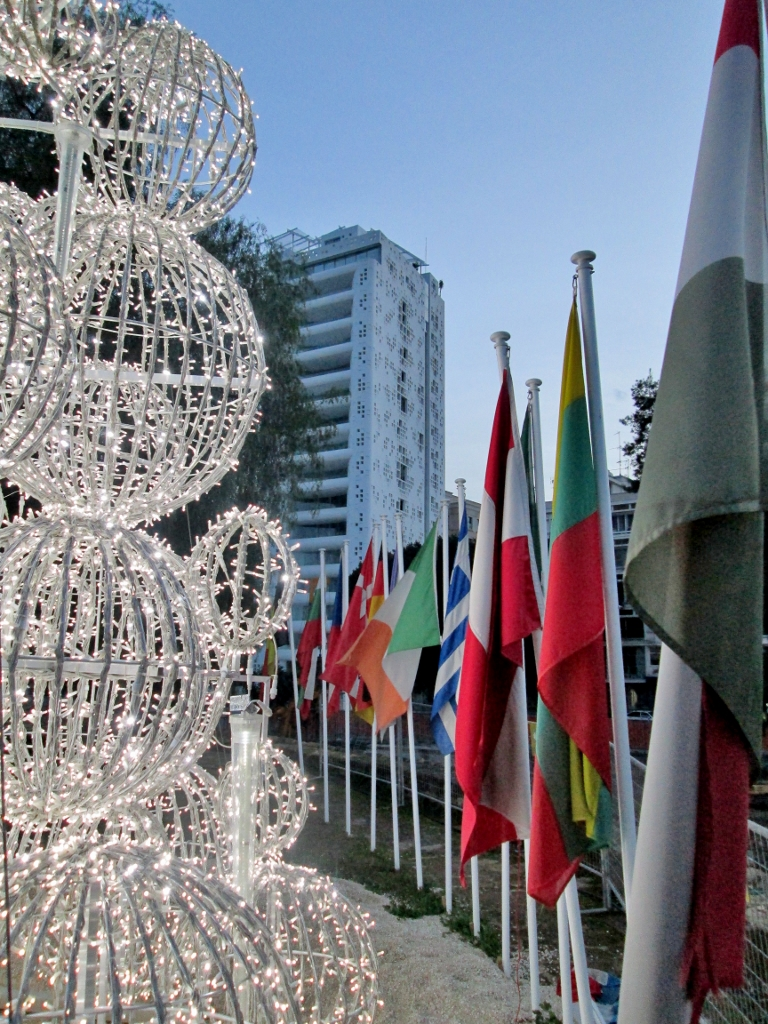
Tower 25 as seen from Nicosia city hall during the Cyprus presidency of the European Union

Nicosia within the city limits is divided into 29 administrative units, according to the latest census. This unit is termed in English as quarter, neighbourhood, parish, enoria or mahalla. These units are: Ayios Andreas (former name: Tophane), Trypiotis, Nebethane, Tabakhane, Phaneromeni, Ayios Savvas, Omerie, Ayios Antonios (St. Anthony), St. John, Taht-el-kale, Chrysaliniotissa, Ayios Kassianos (Kafesli), Kaïmakli, Panayia, St Constantine & Helen, Agioi Omologites, Arab Ahmet, Yeni Jami, Omorfita, Ibrahim Pasha, Mahmut Pasha, Abu Kavouk, St. Luke, Abdi Chavush, Iplik Pazar and Korkut Effendi, Ayia Sophia, Haydar Pasha, Karamanzade, and Yenişehir/Neapolis (separated from Ibrahim Pasha 25 January 2010). Some of these units were previously independent Communities (village authorities). Agioi Omologites was annexed in 1944, while Kaïmakli and Omorfita were annexed in 1968. Pallouriotissa, also annexed in 1968, was subsequently divided into the neighbourhoods of Panayia, and St Constantine & Helen.

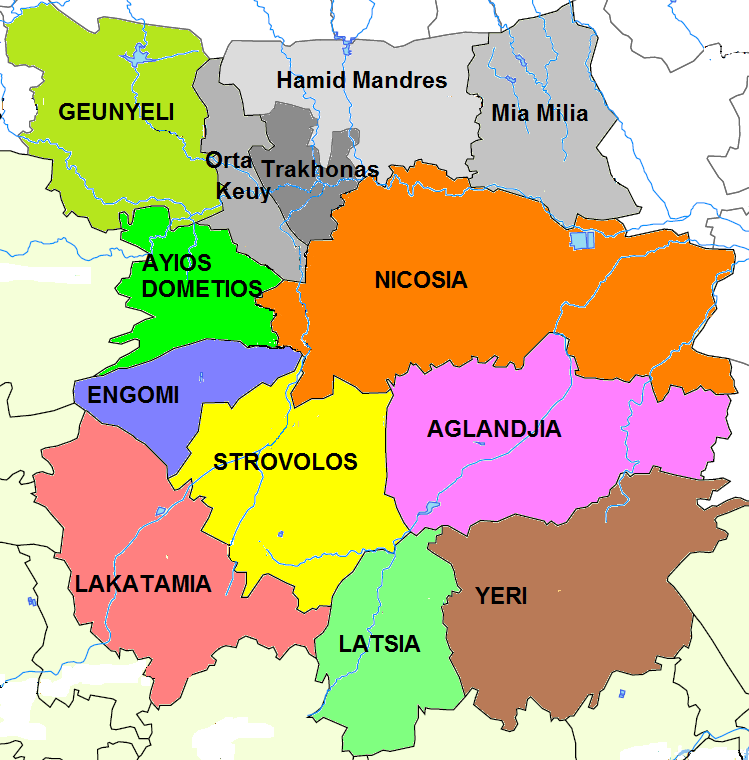

The municipality of Strovolos, established in 1986, is the second largest municipal authority in Cyprus in terms of population after Limassol and encompasses the southern suburbs of the capital immediately adjacent to Nicosia municipality. Strovolos is divided into six parishes: Chryseleousa, Ayios Demetrios, Apostle Barnabas and Ayios Makarios, Ayios Vasilios, Kyprianos and Stavros.

Beyond Strovolos on the south-western fringes of the metropolis lies the municipality of Lakatamia, created in 1986 out of the two Communities (village authorities) of Lower Lakatamia and Upper Lakatamia. After being declared a municipality Lakatamia was, for administrative purposes, divided into the following four parishes: Ayia Paraskevis, St. Nicholas, Ayios Mamas, Archangel-Anthoupolis. Contrary to other Municipalities, Lakatamia Municipality has its own water supply (Lakatamia Water Board). It has jurisdiction over the water supply and sees to the construction, maintenance and functioning of water supply systems within its boundaries.

South of Strovolos lies the municipality of Latsia, established in 1986. Latsia is divided into three parishes: St. George (covering most of the area of Latsia), Ayios Eleftherios (covering the Ayios Eleftherios refugee housing estate) and Archangel Michael (covering the refugee self-housing estate of that name).

East of Latsia lies Yeri, which became a municipality in 2011. The built up area of Yeri just touches Latsia near their mutual boundary and thus the new municipality is conurbated with Nicosia.

The municipality of Aglandjia, established in 1986, encompasses the south-eastern suburbs of the capital immediately adjacent to Nicosia municipality. The Nicosia-Limassol highway forms the boundary with Strovolos to the west. The name of the municipality has various spellings, but derives from the Turkish word 'Eğlence - Entertainment'. The older English spelling is Eylenja.

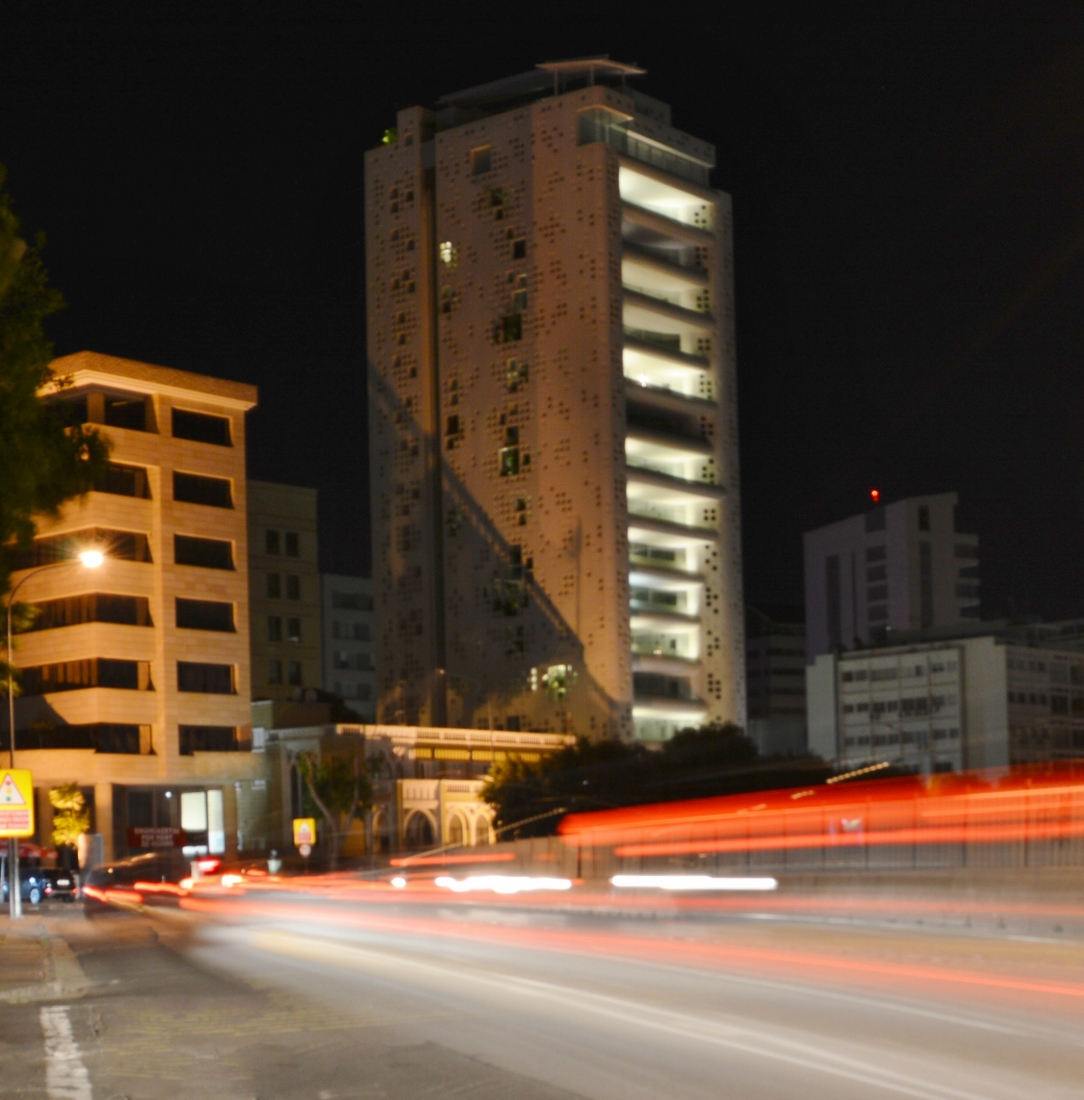
Stasinou Avenue within Nicosia Central Business District by night.

The western suburbs are encompassed in the municipalities of Ayios Dometios and Engomi, both established in 1986. The municipality of Ayios Dometios is divided into the parishes of St. George and St. Paul.

The town of Gönyeli is now conurbated with the northern suburbs. Previously a village authority, it now functions as a municipality within the same area Gönyeli is divided into the Neighbourhoods of Baraj (barrage), Çarşı, Baz and Yeni Kent (new town).

The suburbs immediately to the north of the city have not been erected into municipalities. The village authority of Hamitköy (also known as Hamid Mandres) was heavily urbanized and continued to exist until 1 September 2008, when it was included within the borders of Nicosia Turkish Municipality as a Nicosia neighbourhood headed by a muhtar.

Ortakeuy Village authority has similarly been redefined as a neighbourhood of Nicosia Turkish Municipality.

After the invasion the Greek Cypriot inhabitants of Mia Milia were displaced to other parts of Cyprus and the area was resettled by displaced Turkish Cypriots from other areas. The Mia Milia Village Council of the Republic of Cyprus continues to operate in exile, but the Nicosia Turkish Municipality considers it one of its neighbourhoods.

The ethnically mixed Village of Trakhonas has suffered several displacements of both its Greek and Turkish Cypriot inhabitants since the 1960s and since the invasion has been heavily urbanised. It does not currently function as a local government unit

The settlement of Anthoupolis is an enclave created within Lakatamia after the invasion of 1974 and is directly administered by the government and not the municipality within which it is situated.

Administrative Divisions of Nicosia
Code	Name	Loc. auth.	CY Pop. 2011	TC Pop. 2011	CY Ctrl.	TC Ctrl.	Pop. 1946	GC 1946	TC 1946	On map
1000	Nicosia	Mun	55,014	49,868	P	P	34,485	60%	30%	
1000-01	Ayios Andreas (Tophane)	Neigh	5,767		Y		3,012	74%	5%	AA/T
1000-02	Trypiotis	Neigh	2,158		Y		3,247	92%	1%	Try
1000-03	Nebethane	Neigh	189		Y		520	84%	4%	Ne
1000-04	Tabakhane	Neigh	299		Y		757	93%	3%	TH
1000-05	Phaneromeni	Neigh	512		Y		1,088	98%	1%	Ph
1000-06	Ayios Savvas	Neigh	581		Y		1,266	96%	3%	ASa
1000-07	Omerie	Neigh	206		Y		1,193	77%	21%	Om
1000-08	Ayios Antonios	Neigh	5,801		Y		2,090	98%	0%	AAn
1000-09	Ayios Ioannis	Neigh	221		Y		1,436	96%	4%	AI
1000-10	Taht-el-kale	Neigh	826		Y		1,433	63%	36%	TEK
1000-11	Chrysaliniotissa	Neigh	124		Y		901	96%	3%	Ch
1000-12	Ayios Kassianos (Kafesli)	Neigh	82		P	P	1,177	90%	10%	AKs
1000-13	Kaimakli	Neigh	11,564		P	Un	3,671	98%	2%	
1000-14	Panayia	Neigh	12,398		Y		2,368	98%	2%	
1000-15	St. Constantine & Helen	Neigh	3,209		Y					
1000-16	Agioi Omologites	Neigh	10,528		Y		1,810	93%	1%	
1000-17	Arab Ahmet	Neigh	50		P	S	2,617	22%	32%	AA
1000-18	Yeni Jami	Neigh	215		P	S	2,345	28%	72%	YJ
1000-19	Omorfita	Neigh	284		P	P	2,231	55%	45%	
1000-20	Ibrahim Pasha	Neigh				Y	2,334	28%	66%	IP
1000-21	Mahmut Pasha	Neigh		314		Y	875	7%	82%	MP
1000-22	Abu Kavouk	Neigh		793		Y	1,202	9%	91%	AK (North)
1000-23	St. Luke	Neigh		489		Y	806	33%	67%	AL
1000-24	Abdi Chavush	Neigh		568		Y	902	8%	89%	AC
1000-25	Iplik Bazar & Korkut Effendi	Neigh		229		Y	556	21%	42%	IPKE
1000-26	Ayia Sophia	Neigh		878	P	P	1,936	33%	64%	ASo
1000-27	Haydar Pasha	Neigh		155		Y	385	12%	87%	HP
1000-28	Karamanzade	Neigh			P	P	597	21%	10%	KZ
1000-29	Neapoli	Neigh				Y				IP
1010	Ayios Dometios	Mun	12,456		P	P	2,532	95%	5%	
1011	Engomi	Mun	18,010		Y		1,396	100%	0%	
1012	Strovolos	Mun	67,904		Y		3,214	98%	2%	
1013	Aglandjia	Mun	20,783		P	Un	2,008	93%	7%	
1014	Ortakeuy	Vill				Y	477	12%	88%	
1015	Trachonas	Vill				M	690	95%	5%	
1021	Lakatameia	Mun	38,345		Y		1,537	94%	6%	
1022	Anthoupolis	Set	1,756		Y					
1023	Latsia	Mun	16,774		Y		179	100%	0%	
1024	Yeri	Mun	8,235		P	Un	655	100%	0%	
1031	Mia Milia	Vill				Y	772	100%	0%	
1032	Hamitköy	Vill		2,823		Y	361	0%	100%	
1251	Gönyeli	Mun		11,964		Ind	814	0%	100%	
Code: census code. Loc. auth.: type of local authority (Mun: municipality, Vill: village, Neigh: neighbourhood, Set: settlement). CY Pop. 2011: population at last census of Republic of Cyprus in 2011 (detailed by neighborhood). TC Pop. 2011: population at last census of Turkish Republic of Cyprus in 2011 (not detailed per neighborhood). CY Ctrl.: de facto control of Cyprus Government (Y: yes, P: partly, blank: no). TC Ctrl.: Neighbourhood status in Nicosia Turkish Municipality (Y: yes, S: yes but split in two along Nicosia walls, M: yes but split in multiple neighbourhoods, Ind: Independent municipality, Un: Turkish sector not an administrative unit, P:yes but partial/incomplete control of area, blank: not under Turkish control). Pop. 1946: population at last census before communal troubles. GC 1946: % Greek Cypriot in 1946. TC 1946: % Turkish Cypriot in 1946. On map: abbreviation shown on historic map in this article section (not specified outside city walls).

== Local Government Reform ==
Following local government reform in 2024 there were a number of administrative changes.

The table below lists the new municipalities and the previous authorities from which they are composed, which now become municipal districts with deputy mayors.

District	New Municipality	Municipal District	Pop 2021	Pre	No.Cllrs(*)
Nicosia	LAKATAMEIA	TOTAL	53,273		30
Nicosia	Lakatameia	Anthoupolis	1,693	S	3
Nicosia	Lakatameia	Lakatameia	43,276	M	22
Nicosia	Lakatameia	Tseri	8,304	M	5
Nicosia	LATSIA-YERI	TOTAL	28,230		20
Nicosia	Latsia-Yeri	Latsia	18,579	M	13
Nicosia	Latsia-Yeri	Yeri	9,651	M	7
Nicosia	NICOSIA	TOTAL	111,797		30
Nicosia	Nicosia	Aglandjia	21,543	M	6
Nicosia	Nicosia	Ayios Dometios	12,904	M	5
Nicosia	Nicosia	Engomi	20,502	M	5
Nicosia	Nicosia	Nicosia	56,848	M	14
Nicosia	SOUTH NICOSIA-DALI	TOTAL	22,632		20
Nicosia	South Nicosia-Dali	Alambra	1,655	C	2
Nicosia	South Nicosia-Dali	Dali	12,350	M	8
Nicosia	South Nicosia-Dali	Lympia	2,911	C	3
Nicosia	South Nicosia-Dali	Nisou	2,132	C	2
Nicosia	South Nicosia-Dali	Pera Chorio	3,002	C	3
Nicosia	South Nicosia-Dali	Potamia	582	C	2
Nicosia	STROVOLOS	Strovolos	71,123	M	30

Note: Column "Pre" indicates previous status: M (municipality), C (community) or S (settlement)
