= Chrysaliniotissa =

Neighbourhood of Nicosia, Cyprus

- Chrysaliniotissa, Χρυσαλινιώτισσα, Hrisaliniotissa
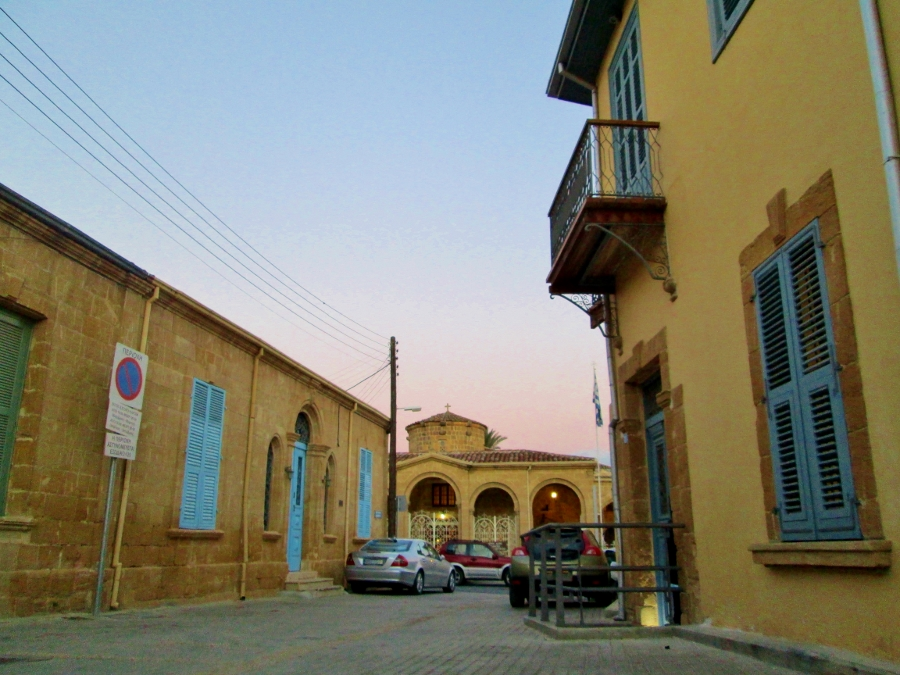
- Chrysaliniotissa

- Location in Cyprus
- Coordinates: 35°10′37″N 33°22′13″E
- Country: Cyprus
- District: Nicosia District
- Municipality: Nicosia

Population (2021)
  - Total: 113
- Time zone: UTC+2 (EET)
  - Summer (DST): UTC+3 (EEST)

Chrysaliniotissa (Turkish: Hrisaliniotissa; Greek: Χρυσαλινιώτισσα;) is a Neighbourhood, Quarter or Mahalle of Nicosia, Cyprus, named after the parish church Panayia Chrysaliniotissa.

== Location ==
Chrysaliniotissa is one of the "Lower Parishes" (together with Agios Kassianos (Kafesli)) located in the east of Nicosia within the walls.

Chrysaliniotissa quarter is bordered on the north by the quarter of Agios Kassianos (Kafesli), to the east and south by Taht-el-kale, and to the west by Ayia Sophia.

== Population ==
Population according to the Census taken in each year, where the quarter is separately reported.

Date	Turkish Cyp.	Greek Cyp.	Greek Cyp. %	Total
1891	8	443	98.2%	451
1901	3	514	99.4%	517
1911	4	543	99.3%	547
1921	12	612	98.1%	624
1931	14	693	98.0%	707
1946	29	865	96.0%	901
1982				269
1992				111
2001				114
2011				124
2021				113

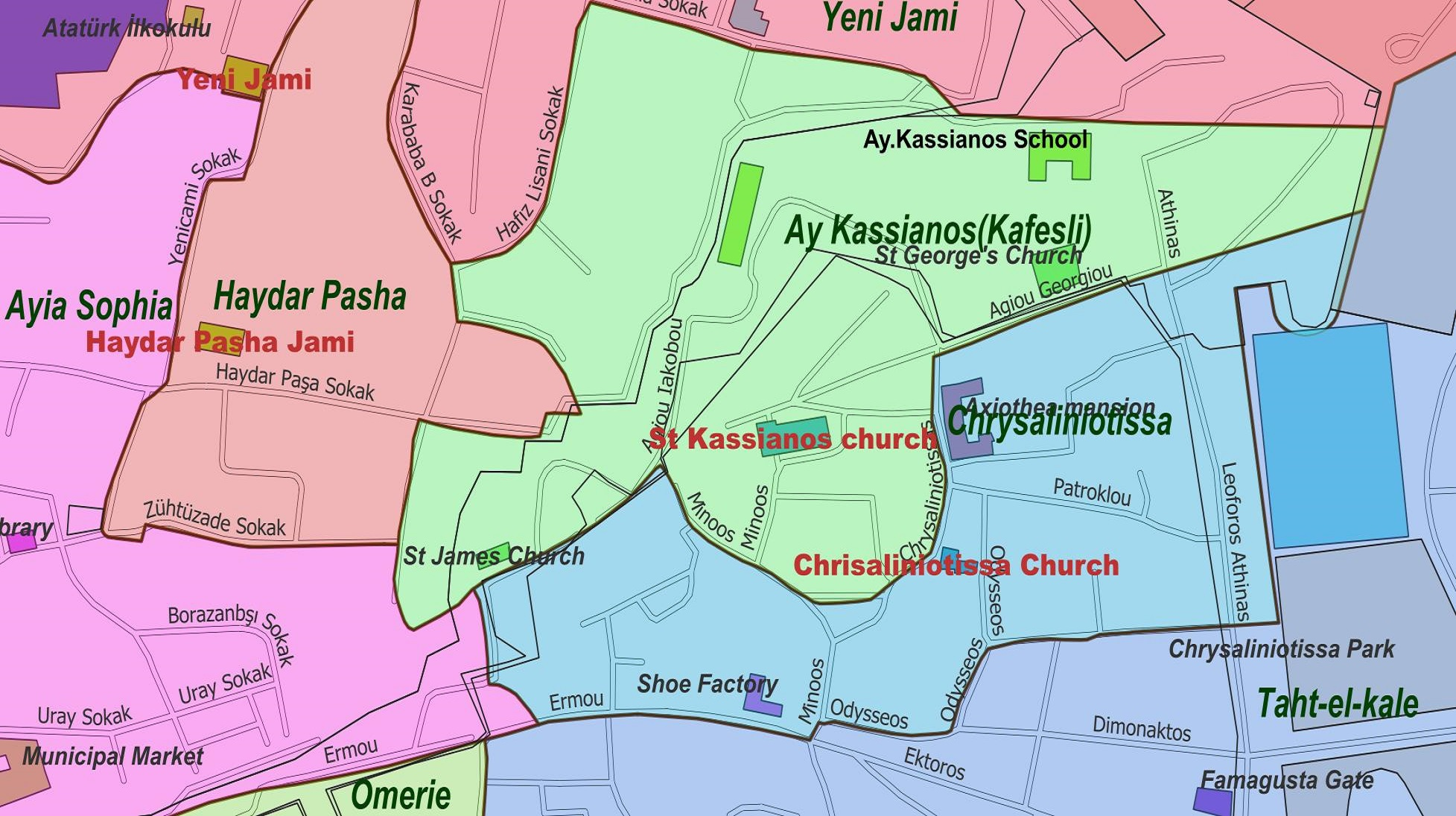
Chrysaliniotissa and adjacent quarters

== History ==
Chrysaliniotissa is one of the 24 historic quarters within the walls of Nicosia. During the Ottoman period it was counted as one of the christian quarters of Nicosia. The 1831 census reported the population of the quarter (Alatyodise) was 100% christian.

Until 1567 the River Pediaios flowed through the centre of Nicosia along the present location of Hermes Street, on the southernmost border of Chrysaliniotissa quarter. In that year the Venetians diverted the river to run outside the city, when they started constructing the walls that year. Chrysaliniotissa is sited on what was once the north branch of the Pediaios which split after it crossed south and east of Ayia Sophia

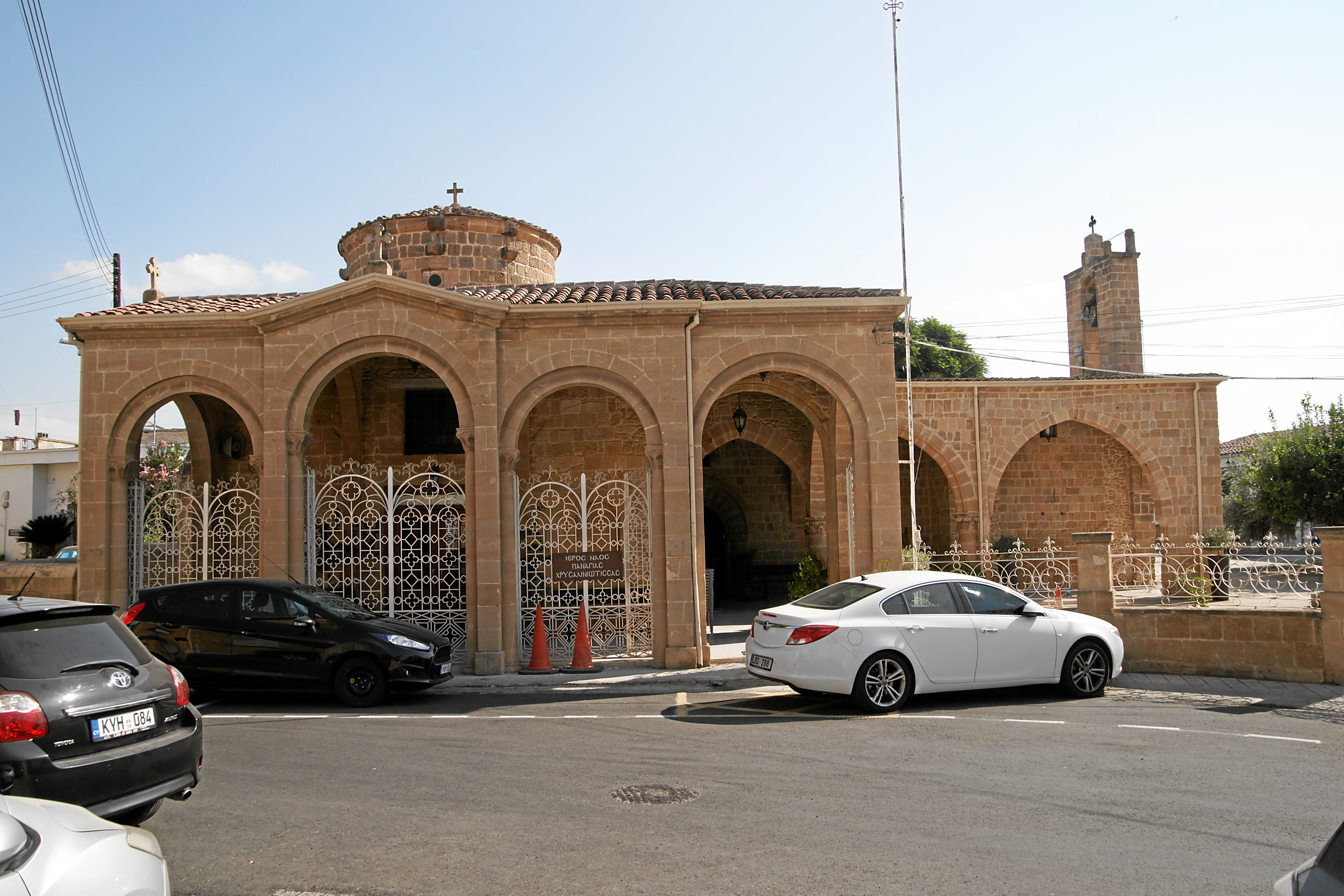
Panayia Chrysaliniotissa

== Landmarks ==
=== Panayia Chrysaliniotissa ===
The church, and consequently the quarter, derive their name from the Greek for golden flax - chryso linari (χρυσό λινάρι). This originates in a legend that an icon of the Panayia or Virgin Mary was found in a field of flax nearby. The church was constructed at various periods and appears to replace a medieval building. There is a monastic courtyard on the south side which has a Venetian style entrance door dated to the 16th century. There are inner arcades with pointed arches the columns of which are imbedded with ancient fragments.

Of the present day churches of Nicosia, Panayia Chrysaliniotissa has the distinction of preserving parts of the building apparently dating from the middle of the period of Byzantine (late Roman) rule.

=== Axiothea mansion ===
The 18th century Axiothea mansion derived its name from the nearby road. It is a two-storey mansion, whose entrance is on the east side, opening out into a courtyard. A row of arches separates the courtyard from adjoining the rooms. It is used by the University of Cyprus as a centre for cultural activities. There are three big halls and four smaller rooms rooms on the ground floor, plus more halls and other smaller rooms on the upper floor.

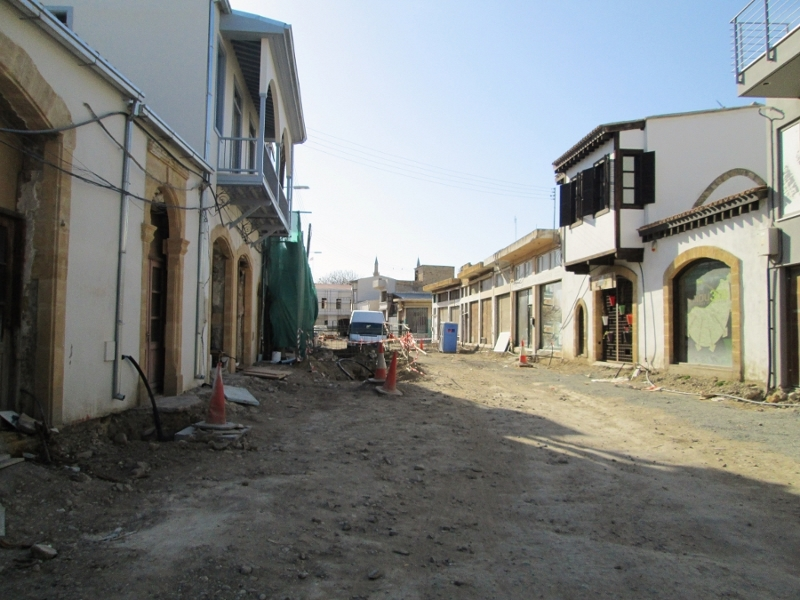
Hermes street being redeveoped in 2013. Chrysaliniotissa quarter on right side of street. Looking west with the minarets of Selimiye (Ayia Sophia) in the background.

=== Hermes Street ===
To the south is Hermes Street and the southern boundary of the quarter runs along the centre of the street. Hermes Street was formerly one of the main shopping streets of Nicosia and this part of it has recently been redeveloped.
