= Nebethane, Nicosia =

Nebethane
- Nebethane
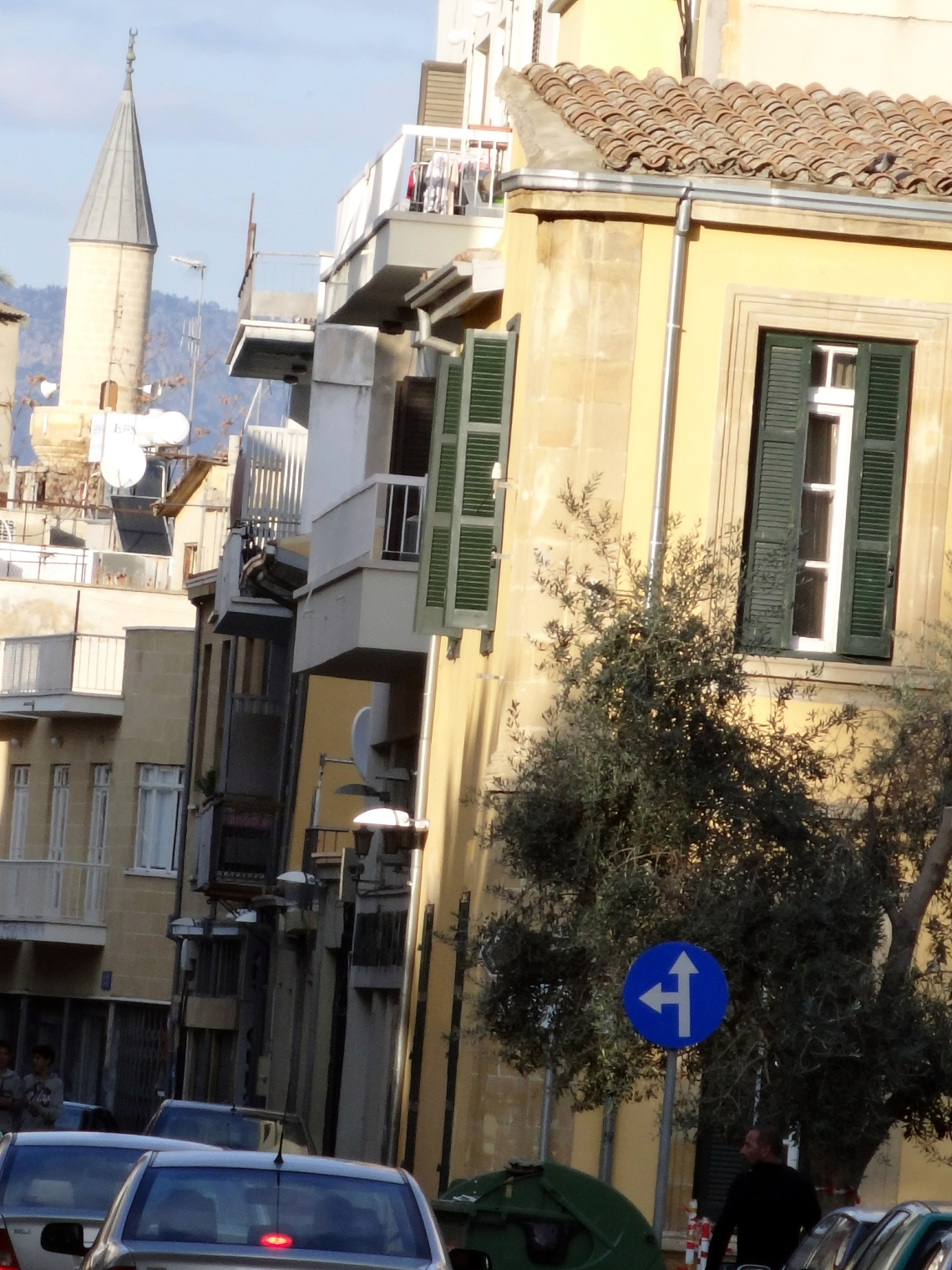
- Traditional houses in Nebethane neighbourhood

- Location in Cyprus
- Coordinates: 35°10′27″N 33°21′35″E
- Country: Cyprus
- District: Nicosia District
- Municipality: Nicosia

Population (2021)
  - Total: 155
- Time zone: UTC+2 (EET)
  - Summer (DST): UTC+3 (EEST)

Nebethane is an historic neighbourhood, quarter, Mahalla, or parish of central Nicosia, Cyprus. Its name inherited from the Ottoman period is Turkish for police station or the guard room of the Turkish patrol. Nebethane Mesjid (small mosque) in this quarter was the place where the police patrol of the city assembled for changing the guard each day, accompanied by drums and pipes.

The name is spelled Νεμπετχάνε in Greek, while the modern Turkish spelling is Nöbethane. The English spelling has varied. George Jeffery's survey referred to Neubetkhane Quarter. It was Nubetkhane in the 1881 census, Nebet Khane (1891-1931, and 1982), Nebethane (1992-2001) and more recently the Greek spelling (itself a transliteration from English) rendered in Latin characters.

== Location ==
The quarter is situated in the centre of the old city of Nicosia within the walls. It lies between Paphos Street and Alexander the Great Street. Its western border runs along Alexios Komnenos and Artemis Streets, and in the east along Pericles and Ledra Streets.

Nebethane quarter is bordered on the north by the quarters of Karamanzade and Iplik Bazar–Korkut Effendi, to the east by Phaneromeni, to the south by Tabakhane, to the west by Ayios Andreas (Tophane).

== Demographics ==
At the last census in 2021 Nebethane had a population of 155.

At the census in 2011 Nebethane had a population of 189, a slight increase from its population of 175 in 2001 and 139 in 1992. Before the communal troubles the population was much larger (see history).

== Nebethane Mesjid ==
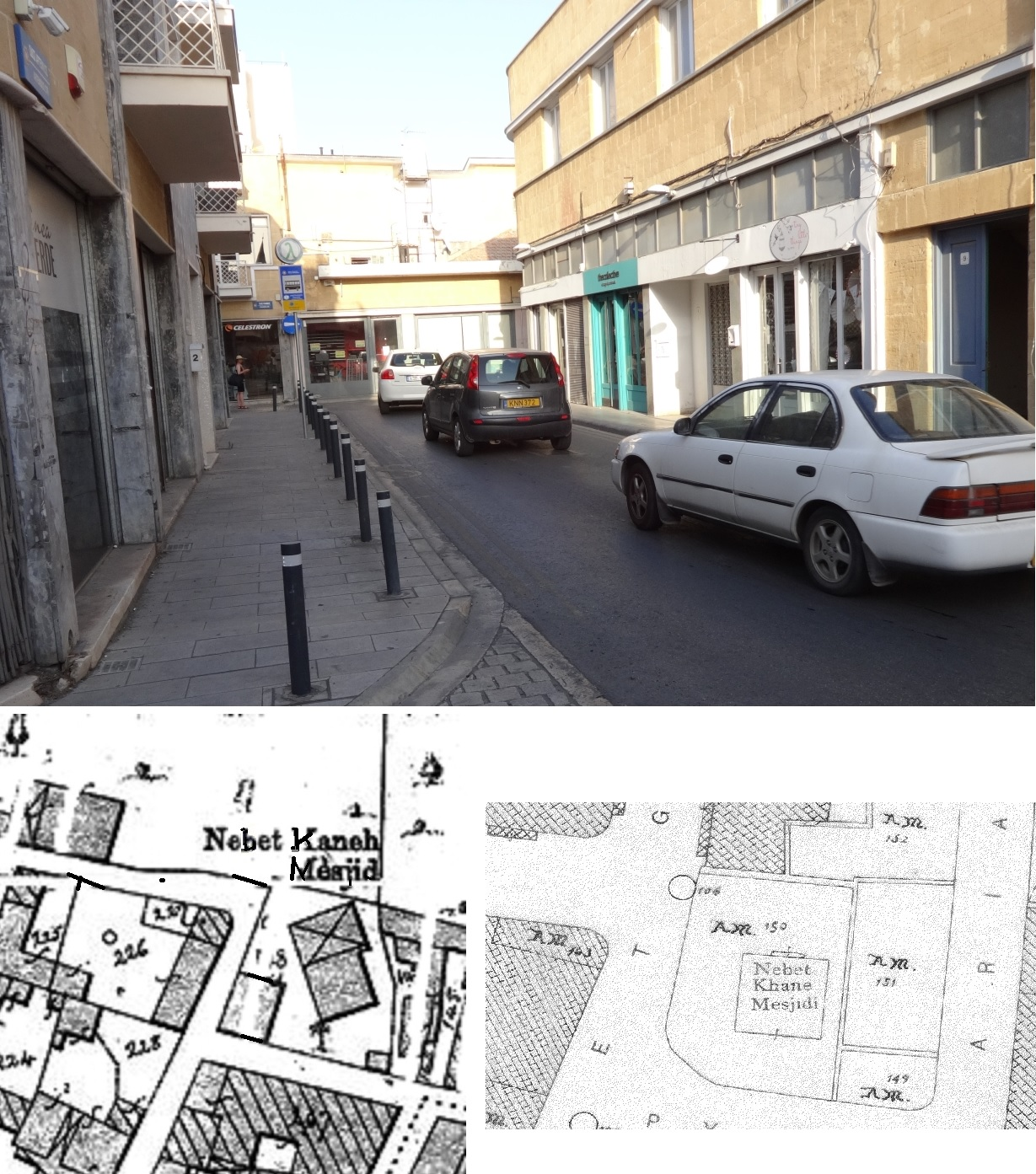
Site of Nebethane Mesjid - 2018 (looking east along Artemis St.), 1912 and 1927

Nebethane Mesjid, the mosque for the neighbourhood (currently closed), was at the junction of Artemis Street and Grammos Street. The mesjid, a one-room structure, was formerly in the middle of a large courtyard, with a fountain in the garden for ablution. The fountain is dated 1867/68, around the time the mosque was built. It was outside the mosque that the changing of the guard ceremonies took place.

At present the mesjid is hidden from the street by buildings.

In 2014 Mufti Talip Atalay accompanied by the EVKAF Foundation's Chairperson Rauf Ersenal visited the mosque, after a religious ceremony at nearby Taht el Kale mosque.

== Landmarks ==
In the early 20th century the north-east corner of the quarter was the location of the Copperware market of Nicosia (for cooking implements and vessels), in Iphaestos Street, formerly named after the market.

At present, this road and a swathe of land running east to west across the quarter is within the closed zone of the Green Line, currently the most prominent feature within the quarter. This zone includes the western part of Artemis Street and Kykkos Avenue.

In Alexander the Great Street stands the residence of Kostas Christodoulou, built between 1920 and 1921 on the site of three older houses, features of which have been preserved in the newer building, such as a medieval doorway. The Centre of Cultural Heritage has been housed in the building since March 1993.

== History ==
Nebethane is one of 24 historic neighborhoods within the walls of Nicosia.

During the Ottoman period it was counted as one of the Moslem quarters of Nicosia. Since then the Moslem character of the neighbourhood has waned, and in 1946, Nebethane had a population of 520, consisting of 438 Greek Cypriots, 19 Turkish Cypriots, and 63 others.

The population of Nebethane during British rule in Cyprus was as follows:

Date	Population	% Turkish Cyp.
1891	296	42%
1901	392	24%
1911	376	27%
1921	386	12%
1931	493	6%
1946	520	4%
