= Agioi Omologites, Nicosia =

Agioi Omologites Άγιοι Ομολογητές
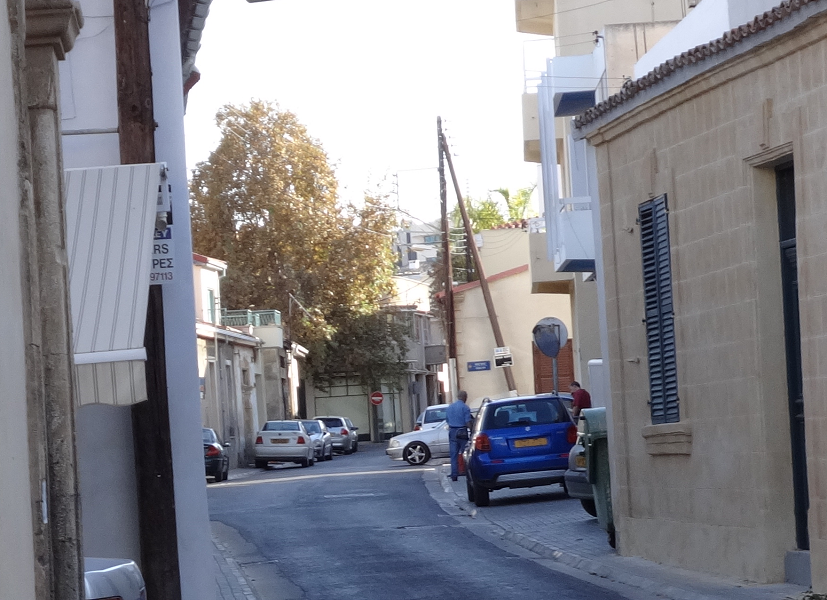
- Agioi Omologites Avenue, traditional thoroughfare of the old village. Note the narrowness of the street and traditional design of the houses

- Location in Cyprus
- Coordinates: 35°9′39″N 33°21′6″E
- Country: Cyprus
- District: Nicosia District
- Municipality: Nicosia

Population (2011)
  - Total: 10,528
- Time zone: UTC+2 (EET)
  - Summer (DST): UTC+3 (EEST)

Agioi Omologites is a Neighbourhood, Quarter, Mahalla or Parish of Nicosia, Cyprus and the parish church thereof. Its name in Greek is Άγιοι Ομολογητές, which means Holy Confessors (a group of saints defined by the church) and also has the name Ayii Omoloyitades (sometimes with "dh" instead of "d") used in older English language works and Turkish.

At the last Census (2011) it had a population of 10,528, an increase from a population of 9,630 in 2001. It covers 153 streets in the south of the municipal area of Nicosia, including Agion Omologiton Avenue, Kyriakou Matsi Avenue and parts of Griva Diyeni Avenue and Arch.Makarios III Avenue.

== History ==
Map of Ayii Omoliyites village before it was absorbed in the city of Nicosia

It is now one of the Neighbourhoods of Nicosia outside the walls. It was annexed to the municipality of Nicosia in 1944, but was previously an independent village. The village was centred on the church of the same name.

In 1946 it had a population of 1,810, including 1,678 Greek Cypriots, 9 Turkish Cypriots and 123 others.

The church was built in 1674, but was much repaired and altered in 1894. It is built over a pagan tomb converted to a Christian church

== Landmarks ==
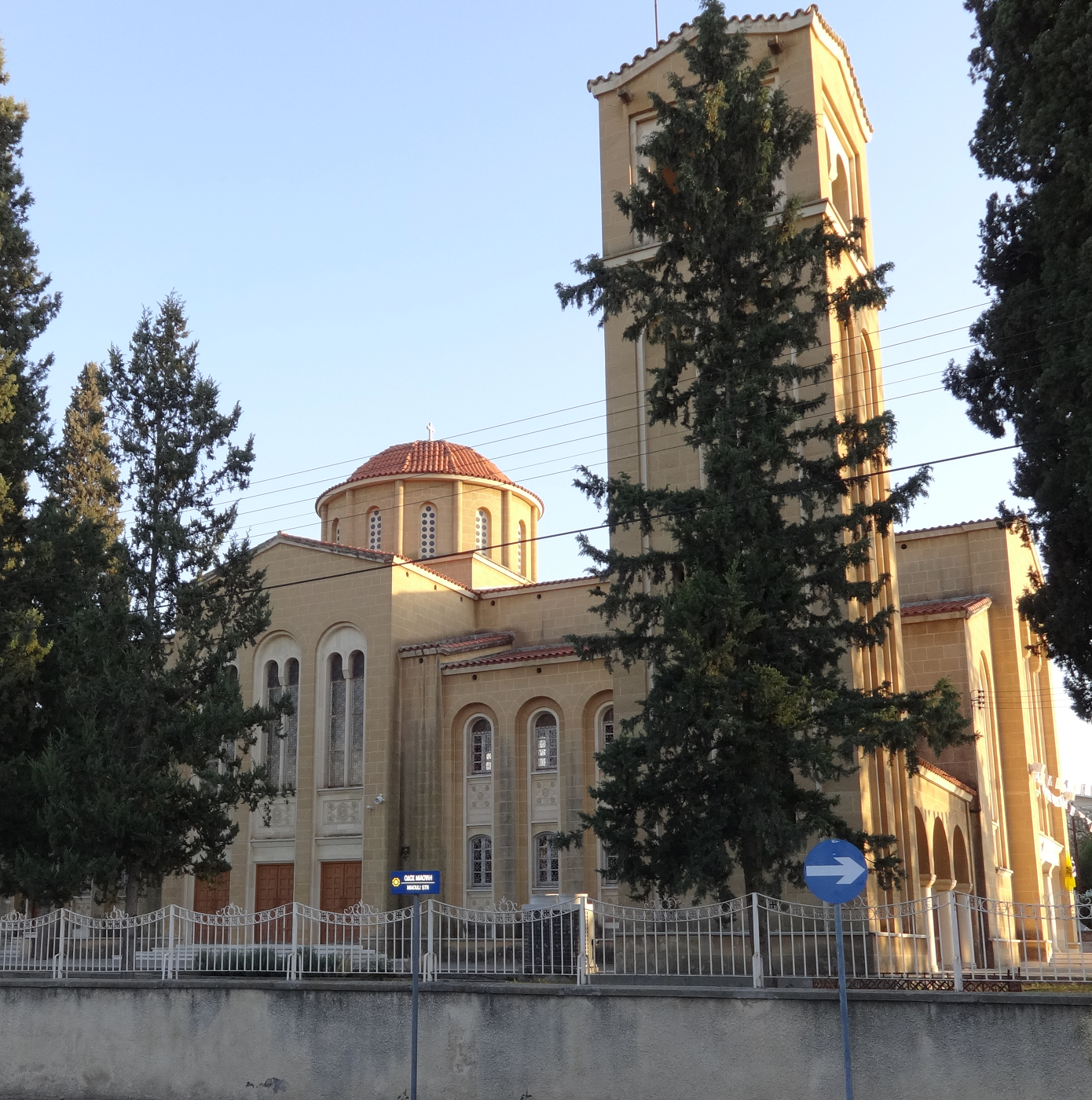
Ayioi Omoloyites Church

The church is located on Agioi Omologites Avenue in the centre of the old village. It has an icon of the Holy Confessors dated 1663. Beneath the church is a shrine cut from the rock, formerly a Roman tomb.

On the south-west side of the village are the grounds of the Presidential Palace, formerly Government House, which is included in the Neighbourhood. On the west side is the river Pediaios the main river, although not permanently flowing, of Cyprus, on its approach to Nicosia.

The English Cemetery of Nicosia is situated by the road leading from Pallouriotissa to the former Government House (see map), which is now named Kyriakos Matsis Avenue.
