= Haydar Pasha, Nicosia =

Haydar Pasha
- Haydarpaşa, Χαϊδάρ Πασά
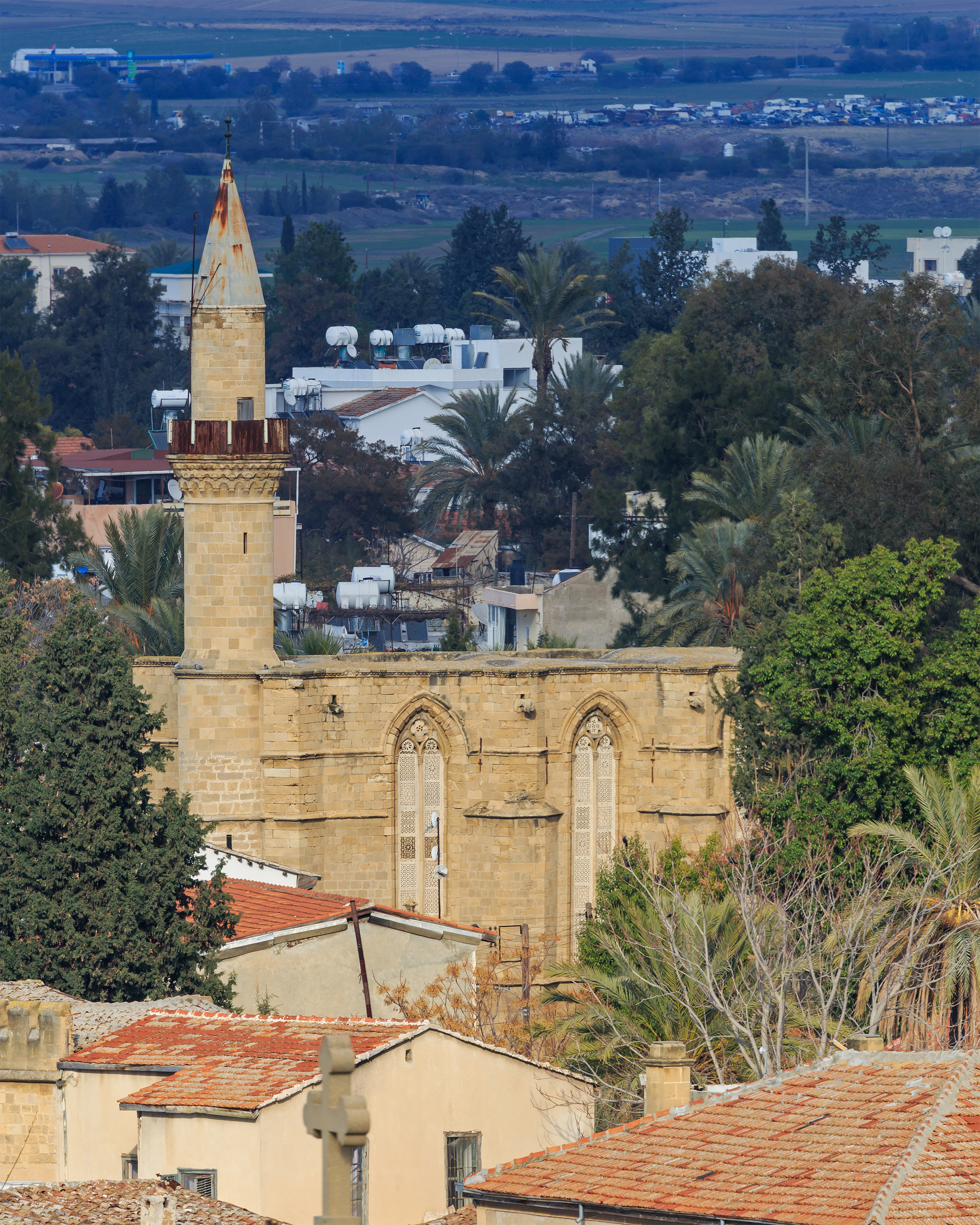
- Panorama of Haydar Pasha Neighbourhood, looking in a north-easterly direction

- Location in Cyprus
- Coordinates: 35°10′39″N 33°21′58″E
- Country: Cyprus
- District: Nicosia District
- Municipality: Nicosia

Population (2011)
  - Total: 155
- Time zone: UTC+2 (EET)
  - Summer (DST): UTC+3 (EEST)

Haydar Pasha (Turkish: Haydarpaşa, Greek: Χαϊδάρ Πασά) is a Neighbourhood, Quarter or Mahalle of Nicosia, Cyprus and the mosque situated therein. Both are named after Haydar Pasha, said to be one of the 12 generals in command of divisions of the Ottoman army at the time of the Ottoman conquest of Nicosia. Each general being posted to a quarter, that quarter was known by his name.

At the last Census (2011) it had a population of 155. In 1946 it had a population of 385 (Turkish 334, Greek 45).

Mukhtari: Muhittin Güven.

== History ==
Haydar Pasha is one of the 24 historic Neighbourhoods of Nicosia within the walls. It was one of the 12 Neighbourhoods into which Nicosia was divided at the Ottoman conquest in 1570

Before 1570 Haydar Pasha mosque was a church of the Latin community dedicated to St. Catherine. It was built towards the end of the 14th Century. Except for the low windows pierced at floor level in the walls and the minaret erected by the Turks, it is changed little from the day it was built.

== Haydar Pasha Mosque ==
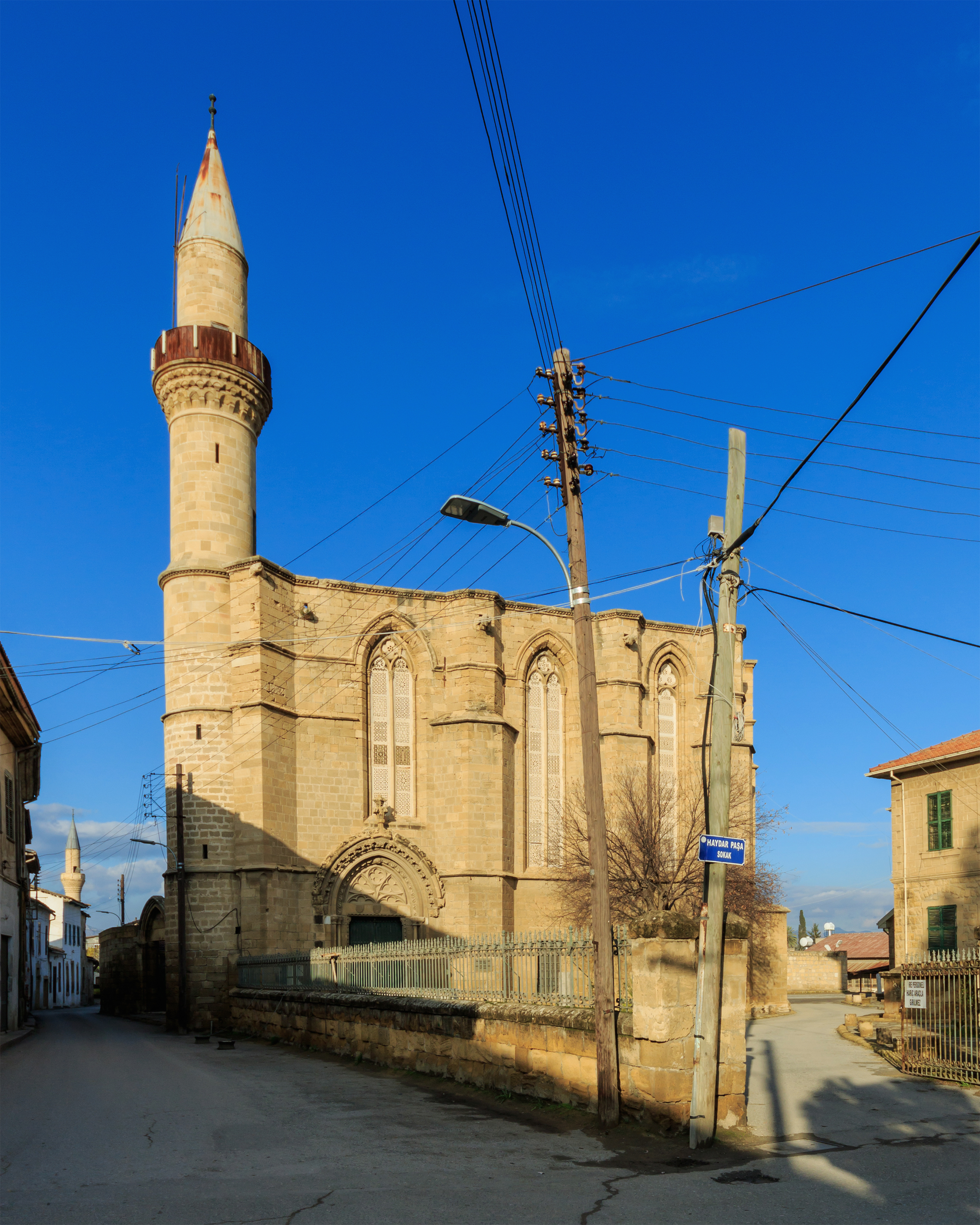
Haydar Pasha Mosque, formerly St. Catherine's Church

Haydar Pasha is the most important Gothic building in Nicosia after Ayia Sophia, formerly the Frankish (Latin) cathedral of Nicosia. It has been described by Harry Charles Luke as representing one of the finest examples of Gothic building on the island.

== Other landmarks ==
=== Lapidary Museum ===
Just south of Haydar Pasha mosque is the Lapidary Museum housed in a 15th Century house. The first floor is lighted with square windows, which have balconies supported on carved corbels, each decorated with a device. This house now contains medieval and Gothic fragments from vanished palaces and churches of Nicosia. The great window in the north wall is from the Lusignan royal palace that stood in Sarayonu Square, until 1904. This arched window is all that remains of the royal palace. Here too is preserved the tomb of Adam of Antioch, Marshall of Cyprus, which was found when the Church of Pallouriotissa was being rebuilt.

The building is in the style of the early Venetian Renaissance and thus may pre-date the Venetian occupation of Cyprus. It is an almost unique example of this style in the island.

=== Lusignan House ===
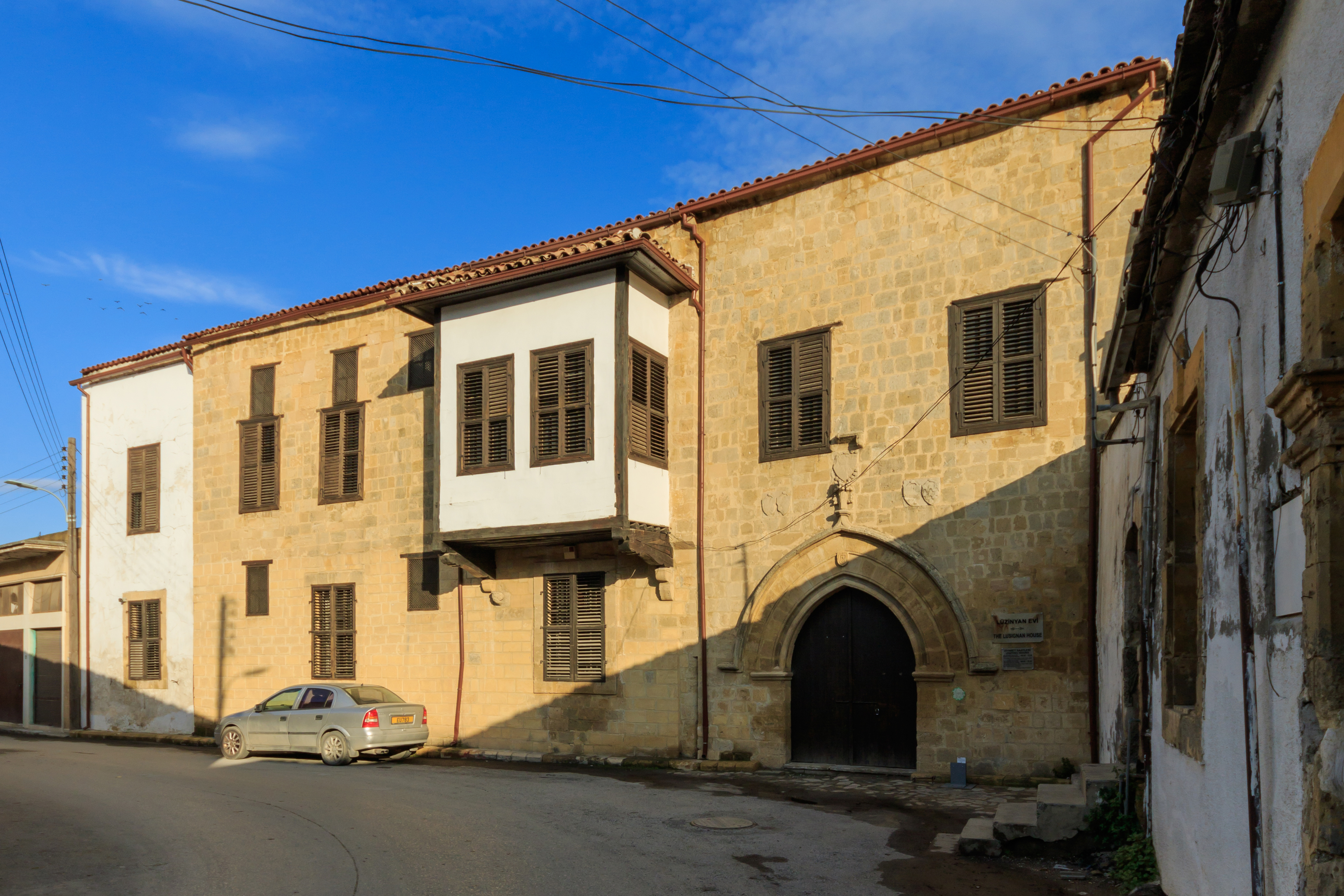
Lusignan House, in Yeni Jami Street

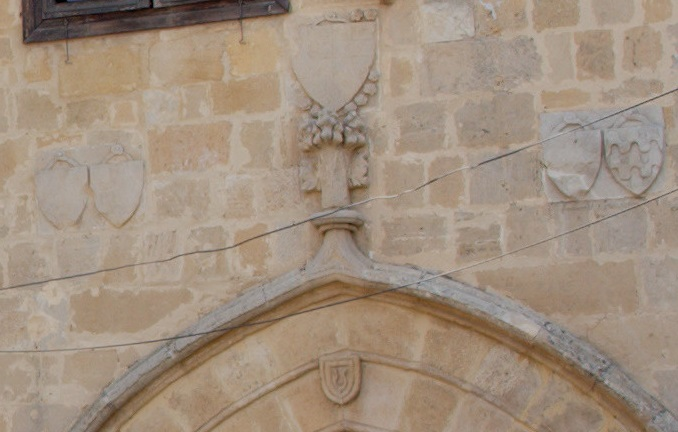
Shield with two pairs of smaller shields, each pair bracketed together

Just to the north of Haydar Pasha mosque is the Lusignan House Museum. Situated in Yeni Jami Street, this 15th century house has an impressive Gothic arch above which are several coats of arms In 1958, the mansion, which had been used by the Russian Classen family as residence and a weaving workshop, was bequeathed by them to the Cyprus Government. However it was not opened to the public until 1997.

The oldest part of the house is the exterior as the interior was repeatedly rebuilt in Ottomans times. The doorway is a pointed arch with moulded voussures under an elaborate hood mould, which terminates in a well-preserved crocketed finial supporting the shield of the Royal Arms of Cyprus (namely of the Lusignan kings), although this shield is defaced or damaged. On either side of this shield are two pairs of smaller shields, each pair bracketed together. The right-most of these is in better condition and bears the common Italian design "Ondato" (i.e. waves). Within the apex of the arch is a smaller shield, probably of the house of Dampierre.

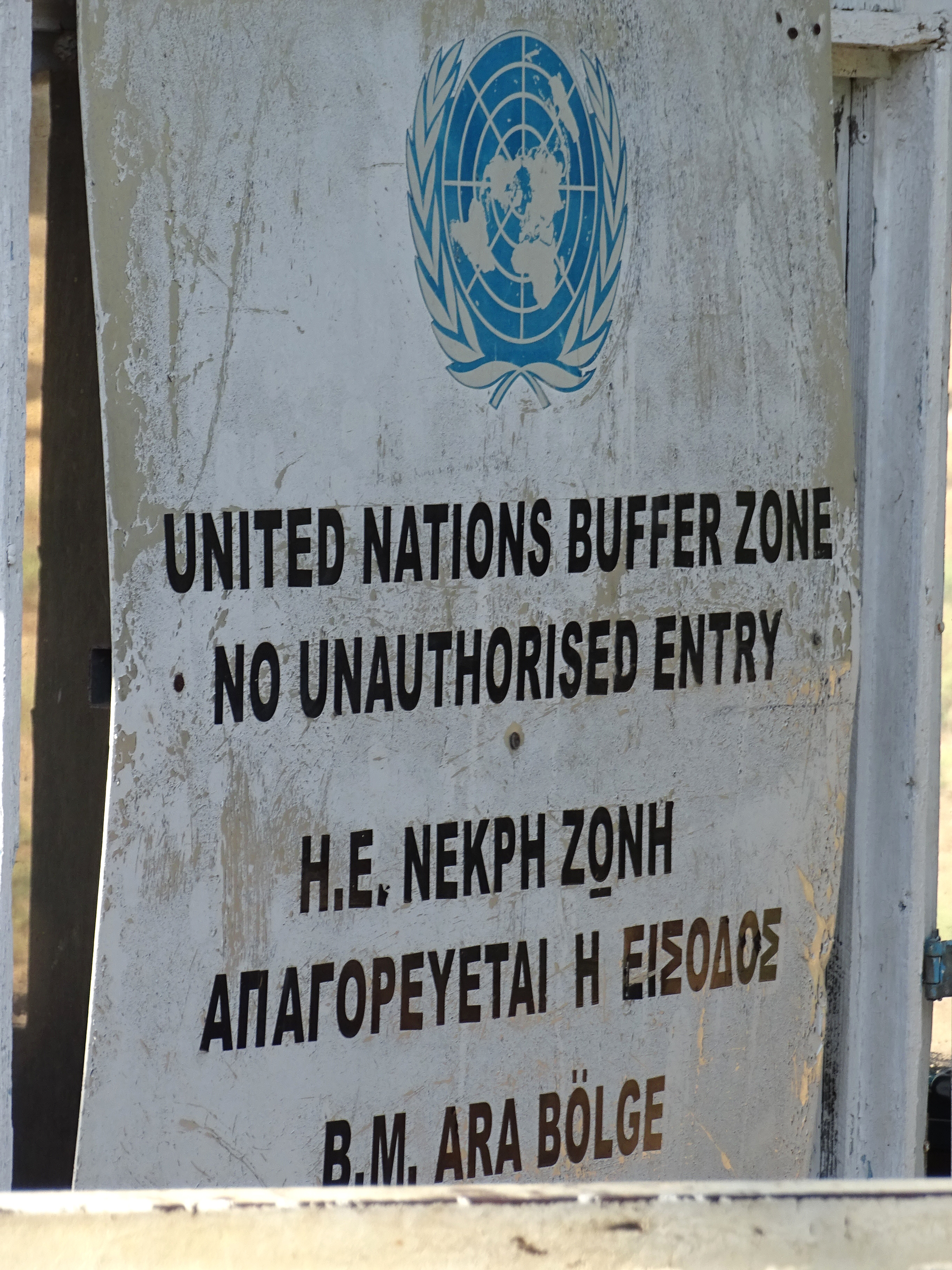
United Nations Buffer Zone in Nicosia

== UN Buffer Zone ==
Whilst the UN Buffer Zone does not pass through Haydar Pasha, some streets on the east boundary are closed because they pass into the adjacent Turkish military zone. These are principally the east end of Haydar Pasha Street and Karababa Street.
