= Ayios Antonios, Nicosia =

Ayios Antonios Άγιος Αντώνιος
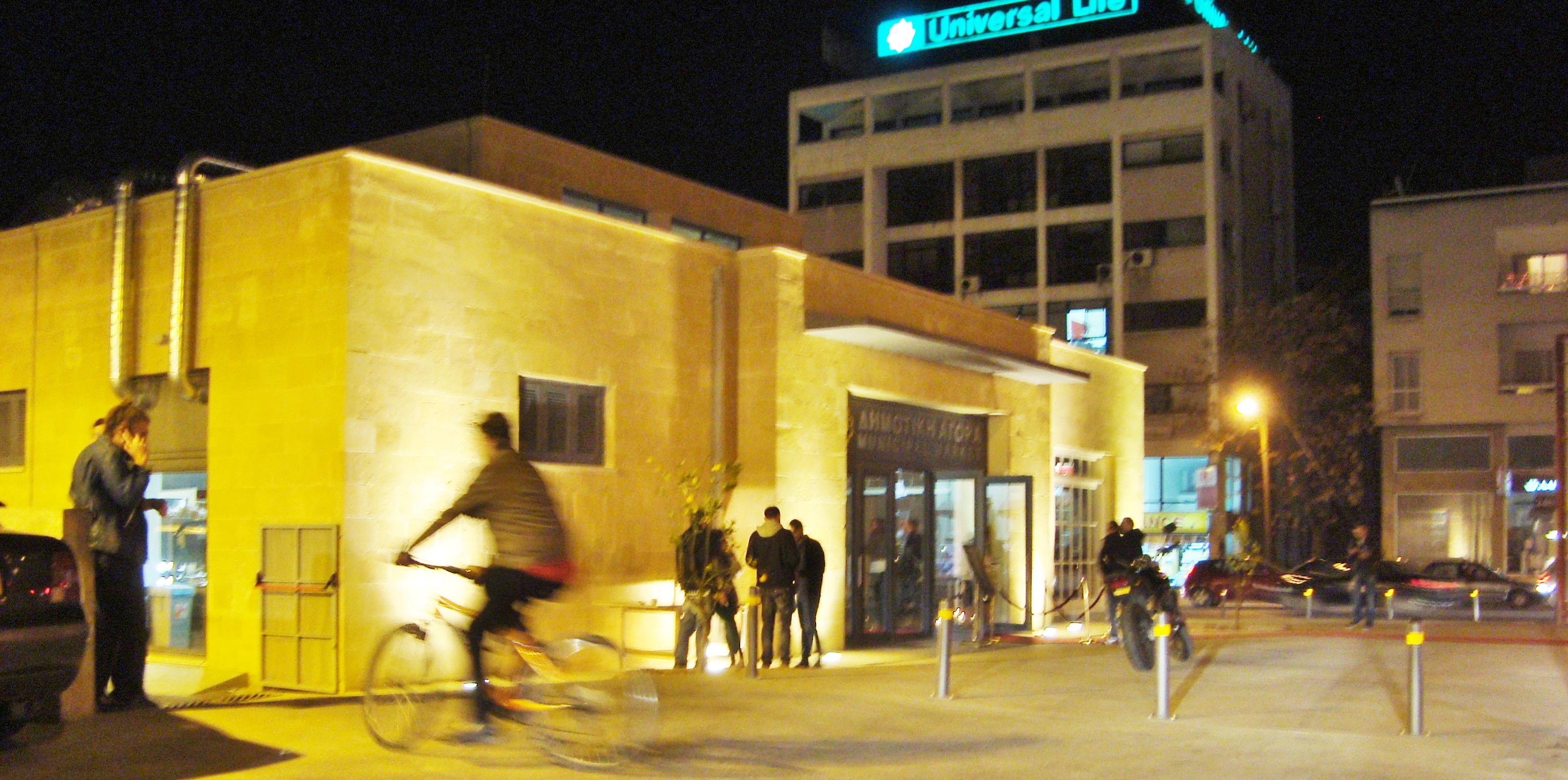
- Ayios Antonios municipal market

- Location in Cyprus
- Coordinates: 35°10′18″N 33°22′4″E
- Country: Cyprus
- District: Nicosia District
- Municipality: Nicosia

Government
  - Koinotarch: Thelma Ioannidou

Population (2011)
  - Total: 5,801

Ayios Antonios (Greek: Άγιος Αντώνιος) is a Neighbourhood, Quarter, Mahalla or Parish of Nicosia, Cyprus and the parish church thereof.

At the last Census (2011) it had a population of 5,801, an increase from a population of 5,233 in 2001. It covers 97 streets in the south-east corner of the municipal area of Nicosia.

== History ==
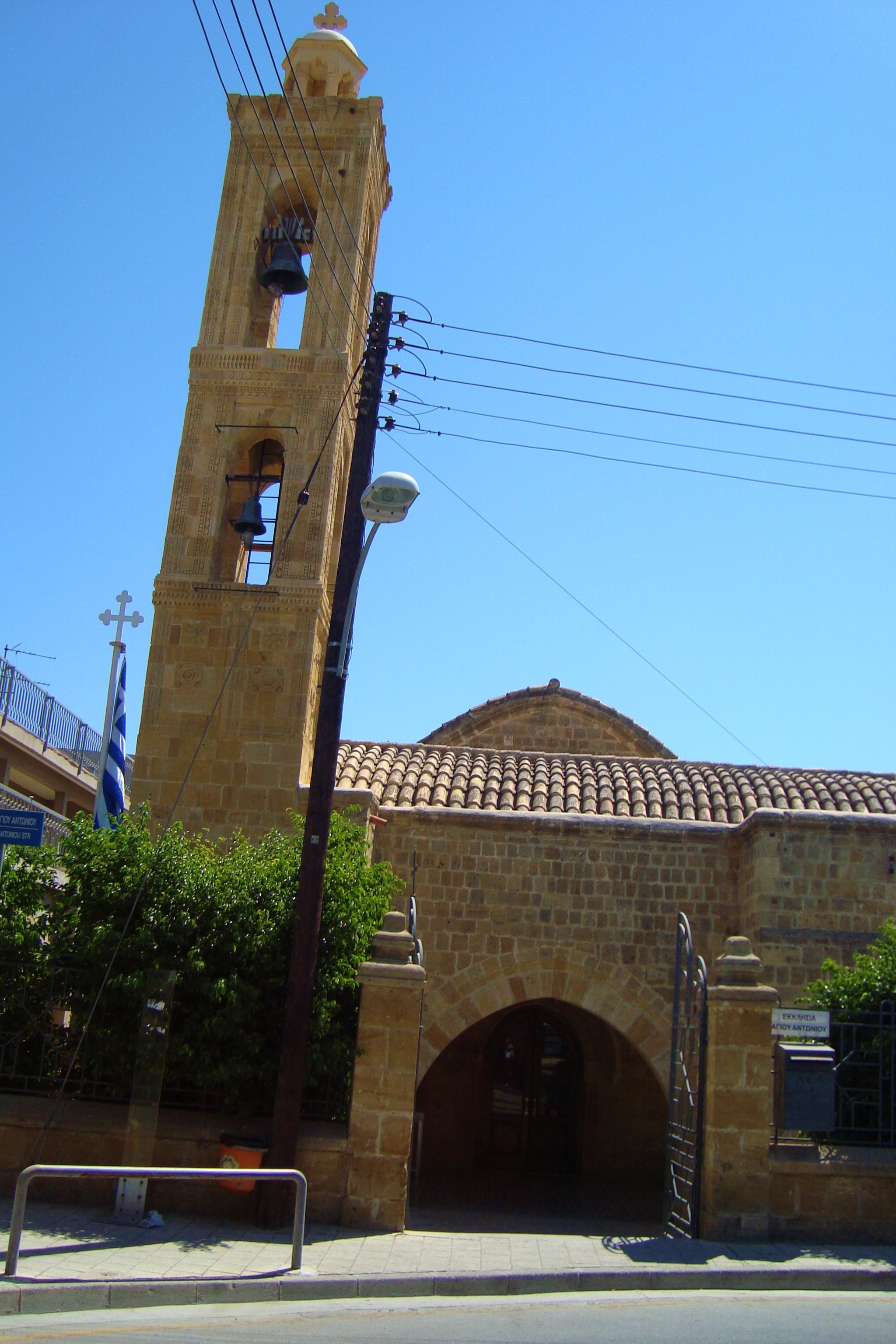
Ayios Antonios Church

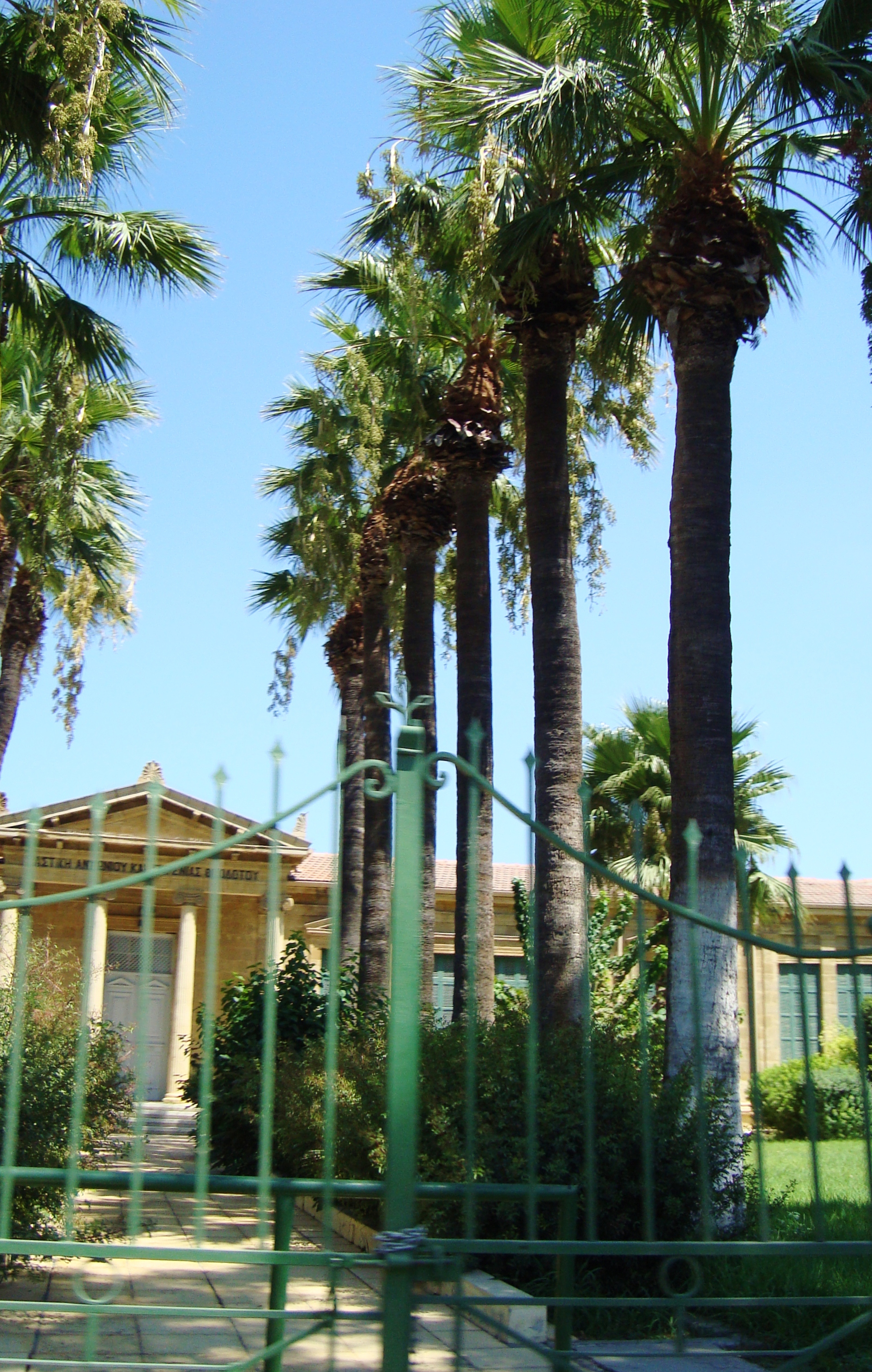
Ayios Antonios school

It is one of the 24 historic Neighbourhoods of Nicosia within the walls. In 1923 it was extended to encompass an area outside the walls between Larnaca Road and the Constanza bastion

The church was founded in 1736, but embodied in the walls are architectural parts of previous churches.

== Landmarks ==
The church is located in Ayios Antonios Street and is about 3 feet below street level and surrounded by an irregular courtyard. It has three arched entrances and a tall bell tower, while inside there is a single aisle. The arched porch has a pointed vault. A similar vault with imposts is the principal feature of the interior. There are windows at the sides and a gallery over the entrance. We see also a fine canopy, similar to the one in the Trypiotis church. The front bears the date 1736. Then irregular courtyard is surrounded by a colonnade.

Other important buildings in the neighbourhood are Ayios Antonios school and the neighbouring Ayios Antonios municipal market. The school's formal name is "Evgenias and Antoniou Theodotou Primary School". It is one of the three oldest primary schools in Nicosia. It started functioning in its present location in 1926, although during 1940-44 the building was appropriated by the army for war use.
