= Hamitköy =

Village in Nicosia District, Cyprus/Kıbrıs

- Location in Cyprus
- Coordinates: 35°13′25″N 33°22′44″E
- Country (de jure): Cyprus
  - District: Nicosia District
- Country (de facto): Northern Cyprus
  - District: Lefkoşa District

Population (2011)
  - Total: 5,338

Hamitköy is an affluent northern suburb of North Nicosia in Cyprus. Hamitköy is under the de facto control of Northern Cyprus, and, since 2008, it has been under the jurisdiction of the Nicosia Turkish Municipality. As of 2011, Hamitköy had a population of 5,338. Prior to its urbanisation, it was better known as Mandres (Greek: Μάντρες) or Hamit Mandres (Greek: Χαμίτ Μάντρες).
