= Ortaköy, Nicosia =

Ortaköy Ορτάκιοι (Greek)
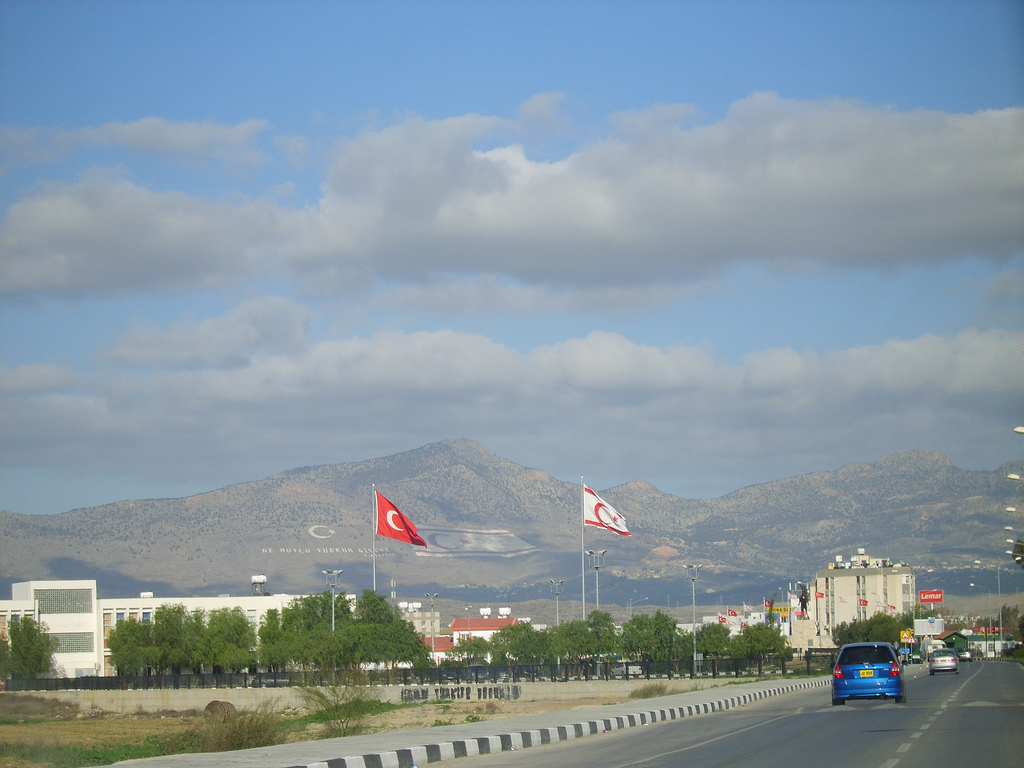
- Nazım Hikmet Caddesi with the Bayraktar College on the left on the outskirts of Ortaköy

- Location in Cyprus
- Coordinates: 35°11′57″N 33°20′26″E
- Country (de jure): Cyprus
  - District: Nicosia District
- Country (de facto): Northern Cyprus
  - District: Lefkoşa District

Population (2011)
  - Total: 8,868

Ortaköy (Turkish for "middle village"; Greek: Ορτάκιοι) is a northern suburb of Nicosia, Cyprus. It is under the de facto control of Northern Cyprus.

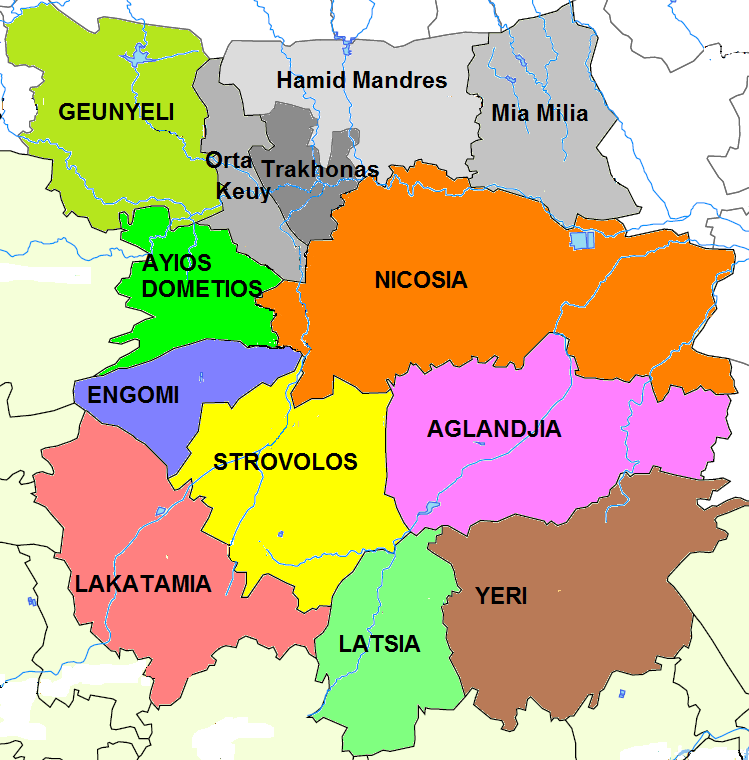
The municipalities of Nicosia. Ortaköy is shown in middle gray.

== Culture, sports, and tourism ==
Turkish Cypriot Ortaköy Sports Club was founded in 1952, and in 2015 in Cyprus Turkish Football Association (CTFA) K-PET 2nd League.
