= Ayios Savvas, Nicosia =

Ayios Savvas
- Άγιος Σάββας
- Location in Cyprus
- Coordinates: 35°10′17″N 33°21′48″E
- Country: Cyprus
- District: Nicosia District
- Municipality: Nicosia

Population (2011)
  - Total: 581
- Time zone: UTC+2 (EET)
  - Summer (DST): UTC+3 (EEST)

Ayios Savvas (Greek: Άγιος Σάββας) is a neighbourhood, quarter, mahalla, or parish of Nicosia, Cyprus and the parish church thereof.

At the 2011 census, it had a population of 581, an increase from a population of 523 in 2001. It covers 25 streets in the south of Nicosia within the walls.

== History ==
It is one of the 24 historic neighbourhoods of Nicosia within the walls. In 1946 it had a population of 1,266 of which 1,211 were Greek Cypriot, 39 were Turkish Cypriot, and 16 were of other people groups.

The church was built in 1850 and 1851.

== Parish church ==
The church stands on the corner of St. Savvas and Aeschylus streets.

It was built in 1850 and 1851 on the foundations of an earlier, probably Byzantine church. It is a two-aisled building with four entrances and a portico built most probably in 1900 when the belfry was built too. The south wall of the church most probably belongs to the previous church. Though the church has no architectural interest, nevertheless it contains some old portable icons as well as some old furniture.

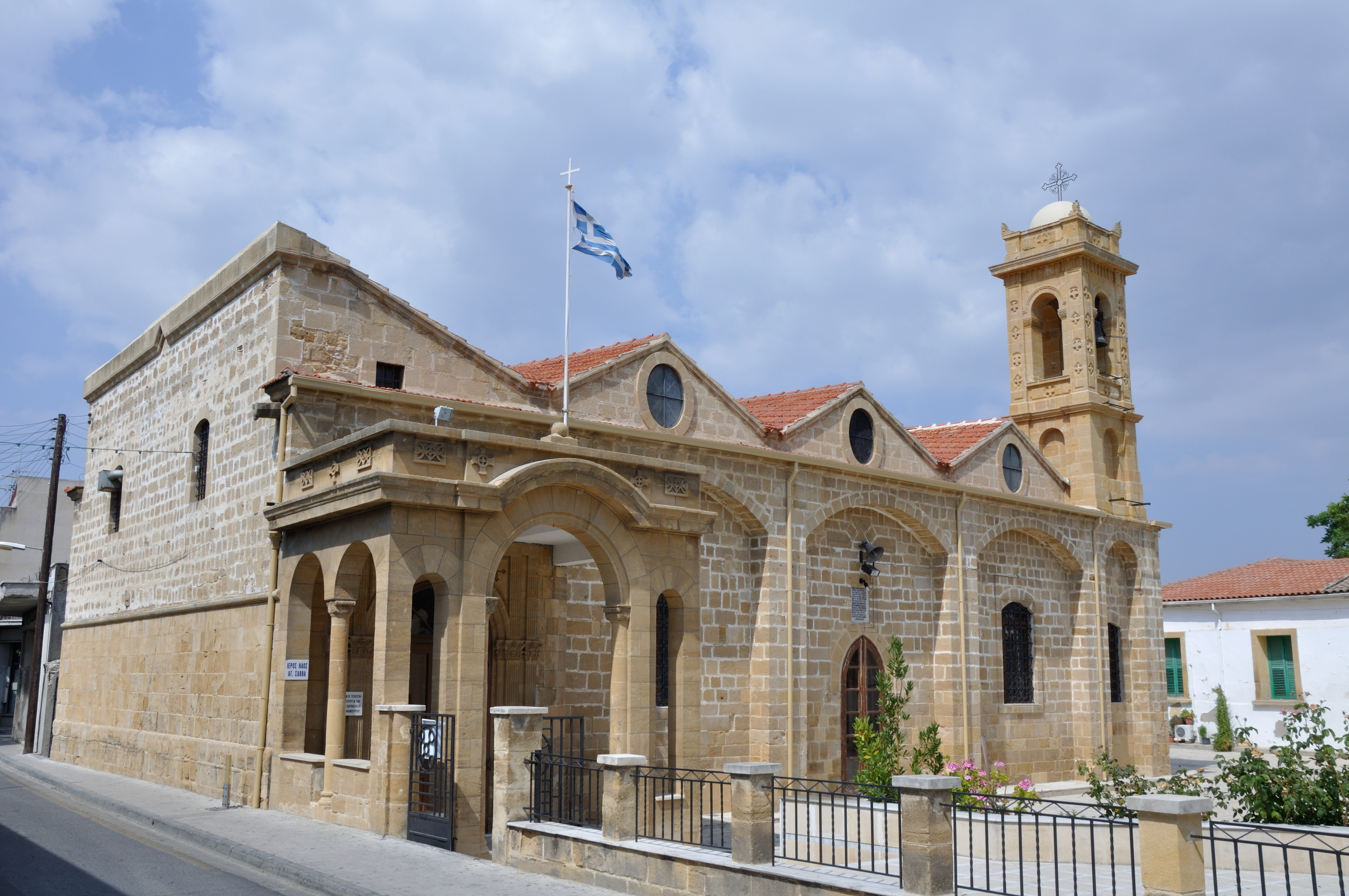
Ayios Savvas Church

The church is of a monotholus built. At the west end is a narthex dividing, as is often the case, the west wall of the church from the boundary of the road.

Inside the building a few relics from the more ancient church on the site are still preserved. The modern iconostasis is of the usual character, but behind it is preserved the rood from an ancient screen dated 1659. A still more interesting fragment is a gilded panel about 1 m by 50 cm, on which is painted a remarkable portrait of a personage dressed in furred robes, and with a large cap of an Eastern type on his head. This personage is represented in a sitting or kneeling attitude, whilst the gilded background is covered with an inscription in elegant medieval lettering of considerable length. Unfortunately this inscription which seems to be an ascription to St. Savvas is too much defaced to allow of decipherment. The tablet is now clumsily nailed against the side of the iconostasis to fill up a lower panel, and is so little regarded that instead of occupying its original position, it is now placed on its side. This panel is an excellent example of the very rare, ex-voto intended to occupy a place alongside of the usual pictures of the saints on the iconostasis. It is painted on a gold leaf background in precisely the same way and apparently in egg-tempera. Another example of the same kind is the portrait of Maria di Molino at Ay. Chrysostomos Monastery (Kyrenia District). Other examples of the 16th century ex-voto with portraiture of donors may be seen on the iconostasis of Chrysaliniotissa church, Nicosia, but this one of St. Savvas is remarkable for the absence of any saintly figure on the panel. A chalice dated 1516 is said to have formerly been preserved in this church. In the centre of the church is a large gravestone without any trace of effigy or inscription, and strangely placed lengthwise north and south instead of in the more customary manner east and west.
