= Ayios Kassianos, Nicosia =

Ayios Kassianos
- Άγιος Κασσιανός, Aykasyano
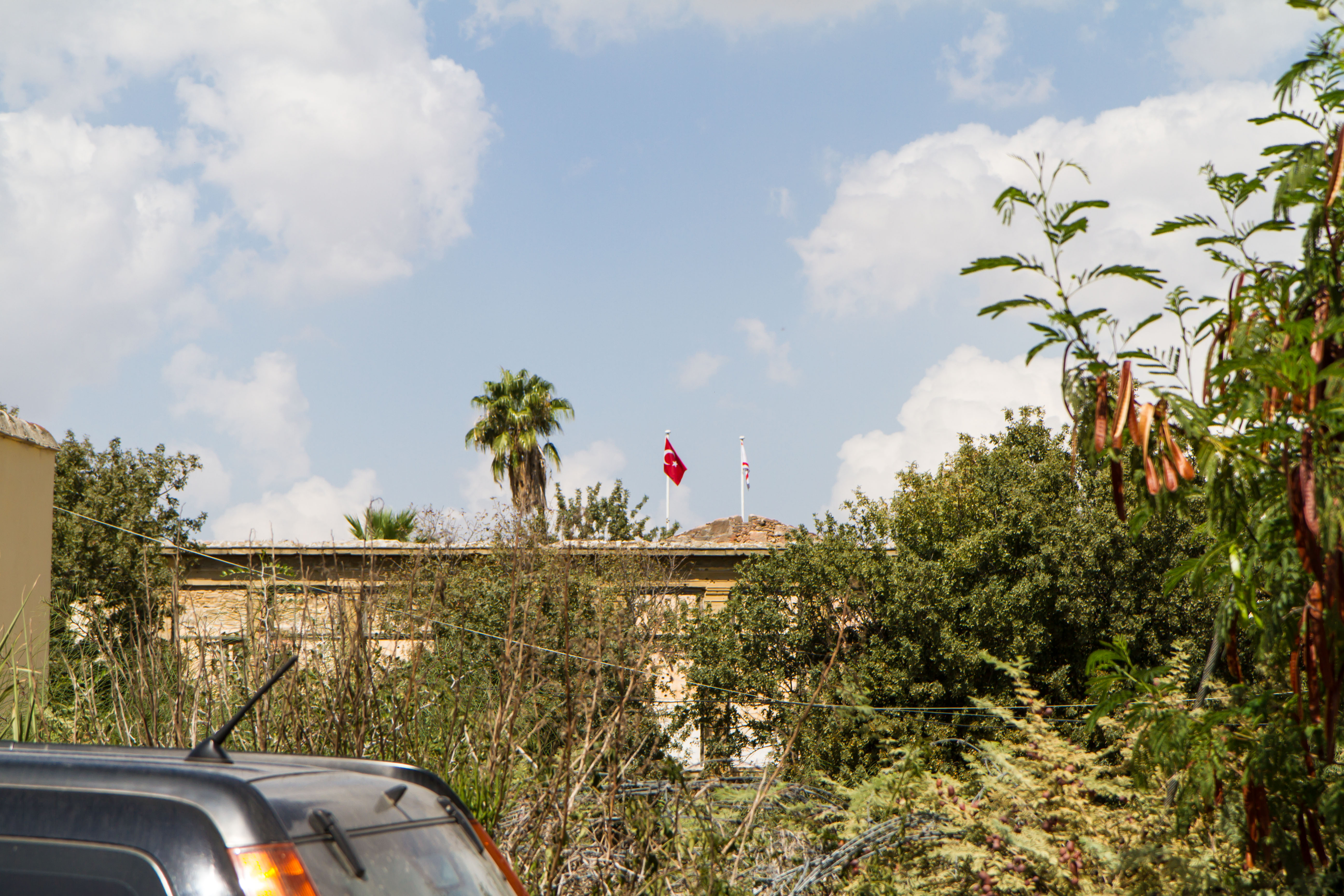
- Ayios Kassianos School in U.N. Buffer zone

- Location in Cyprus
- Coordinates: 35°10′37″N 33°22′9″E
- Country: Cyprus
- District: Nicosia District
- Municipality: Nicosia

Population (2011)
  - Total: 315
- Time zone: UTC+2 (EET)
  - Summer (DST): UTC+3 (EEST)

Ayios Kassianos is a Neighbourhood, Quarter, Mahalla or Parish of Nicosia, Cyprus and the church situated therein after which the Quarter is named. It is Άγιος Κασσιανός in Greek and Aykasyano in Turkish and also has the historic name Kafesli (lattice or cage). At the last Census (2011) it had a population of 315,.

The population in 1946 was 1,177, consisting of 1,686 Greek Cypriots, 115 Turkish Cypriots and 1 other.

== History ==
It is one of the 24 historic Neighbourhoods of Nicosia within the walls.

== Landmarks ==
=== The parish church of Ayios Kassianos ===
This church is modern (1854) with many fragments of a more ancient building inserted in its walls. Possibly the central arcade supporting the vaulting of its two aisles may be ancient. This arcade is carried on two circular columns with cushion capitals and between them is a singular looking font on a platform which is said to be used for a ceremony on the festival of the Epiphany. The baldachino of stone over the altar and the iconostasis appear to be of the same date as the modern rebuilding in 1854. There are several ancient icons (traditionally said to have been brought from Ayia Sophia in Constantinople after the Turkish conquest), one of which is of unusually large size. Another is dated 1529. In the narthex amongst other fragments is a small basso-relievo of the Madonna and Child under a canopy, common rustic work of the 15th century. This is the only surviving church in Cyprus dedicated to St. Cassian.

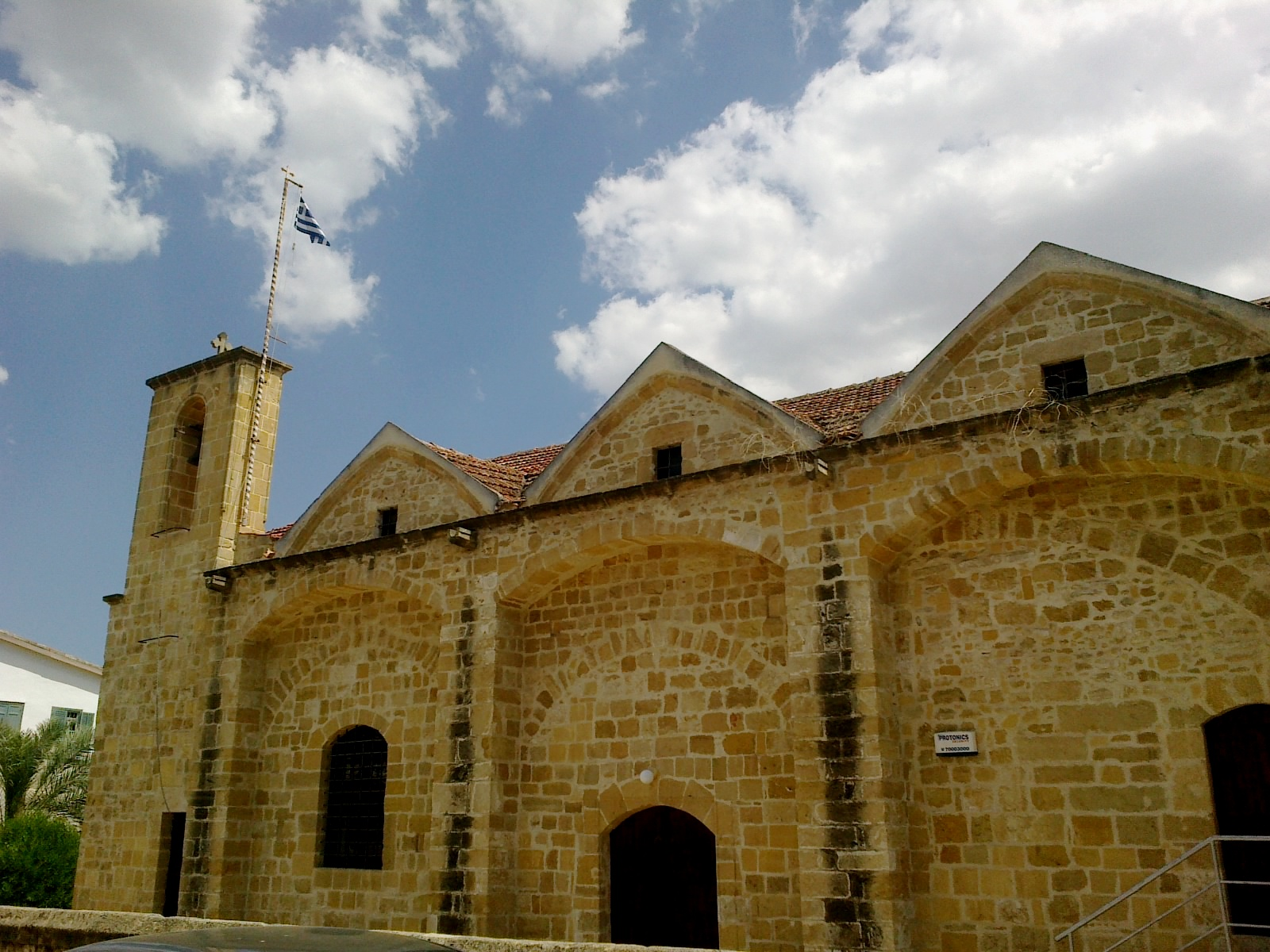
Parish church of Ayios Kassianos

The church stands close to Chrysaliniotissa church and very near the Green line. It has an 18th-century iconostasis and a number of valuable icons, some of which have been removed to the Byzantine Museum of the Archbishop Makarios Ill Foundation. The bones and scull of St. Cassian, a 4th-century Roman saint, are kept in a golden box in the church. Another treasure of the church is a silver helmet of the saint believed to be miraculous and recommended for those suffering from headaches.

The church is dedicated to St. Cassian the Roman, whose saint day is 29 February and is thus celebrated every four years. St. Cassian the Roman ranks among the leading figures of Orthodox asceticism and is regarded as the founder of monasticism in Western Europe.

=== St. James’s Monastery ===
This building is a small single naved chapel, surmounted by a dome, without architectural character, and comparatively modern. As this little monastery is not mentioned by Kyprianos in his list of churches in Nicosia it belongs apparently to the 19th century. This monastery adjoins a ruined property known as the "Queen's House". De Mas Latrie suggests this may have been the chapel of St. Jacques de Commersarie adjoining the house of Sir Simon de Montolif.

=== St. George’s Church ===
This church is in the area adjacent to the closed military zone on the Green Line. It dates from the 17th century. The narthex on the west part of the street that gives access to the main entrance door opens onto the south of Ayios Georgios. Search the east wall of the narthex relief in the form of ornaments, has an altar in the eastern apse.

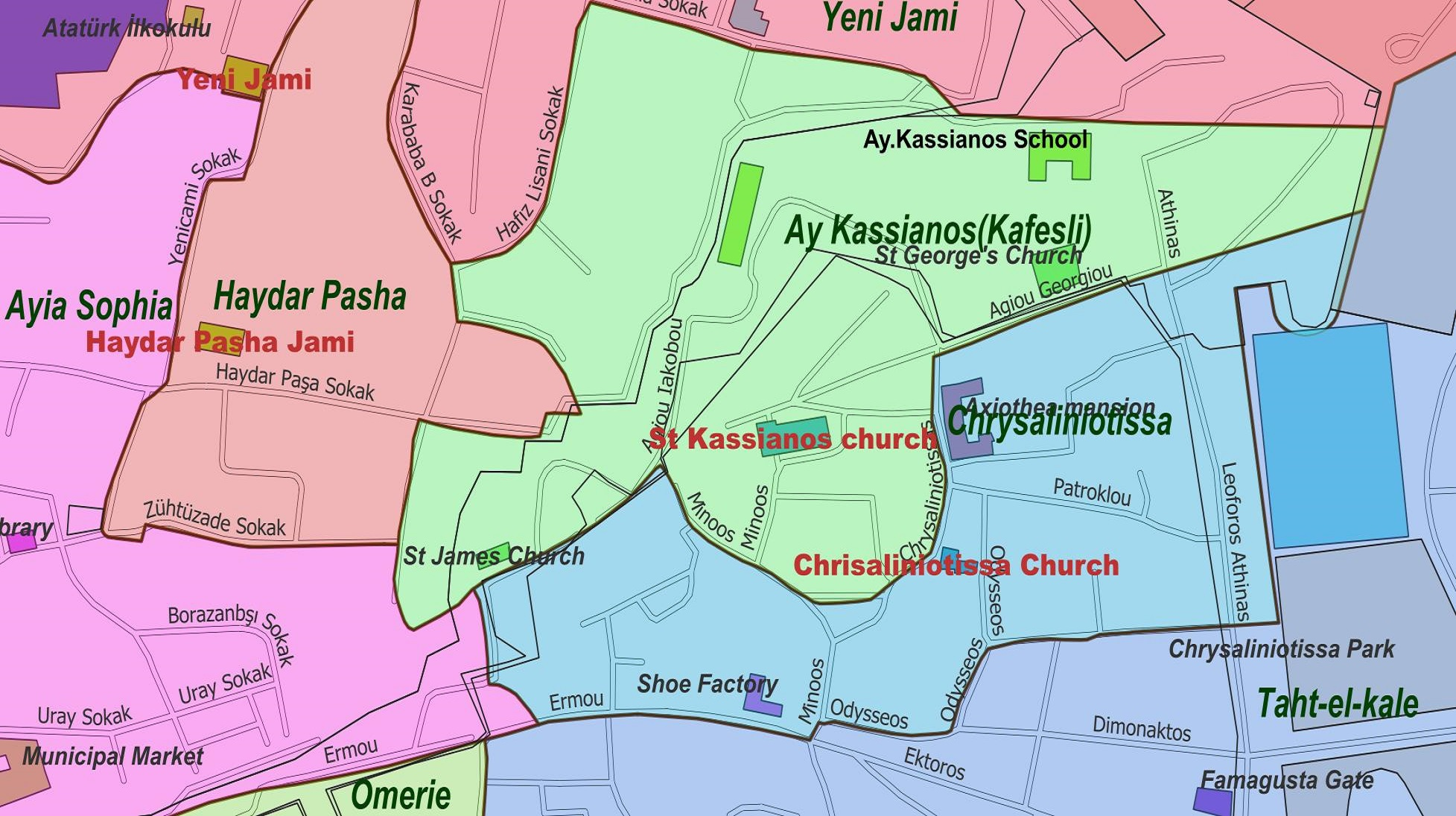
Ayios Kassianos and adjacent quarters

=== Ayios Kassianos School ===
Currently, the school is devastated by the green line in the area adjacent to the closed military zone. It consists of two separate buildings made of Neoclassical style. For the first quarter of the 20th century, the area in the east was for boys, while the west school was for girls. In later years a male nursery school was built in the north-east. These schools are similar to other schools in Nicosia within the walls.

== Current division ==
The Ayios Kassianos Neighbourhood currently under the control of the government of Cyprus extends only to the area around Ayios Kassianos church and south of St. George's church. This had a population of 82 at the last census. The population in the Turkish controlled area was 233.
