= Tabakhane, Nicosia =

Tabakhane
- Tabakhane
- Location in Cyprus
- Coordinates: 35°10′20″N 33°21′35″E
- Country: Cyprus
- District: Nicosia District
- Municipality: Nicosia

Population (2011)
  - Total: 299
- Time zone: UTC+2 (EET)
  - Summer (DST): UTC+3 (EEST)

Tabakhane is a historic neighborhood, quarter, Mahalla, or parish of central Nicosia, Cyprus, named after the tannery which formerly existed just outside the city walls, near Paphos Gate. Its name is the Arabic and Turkish word for tannery.

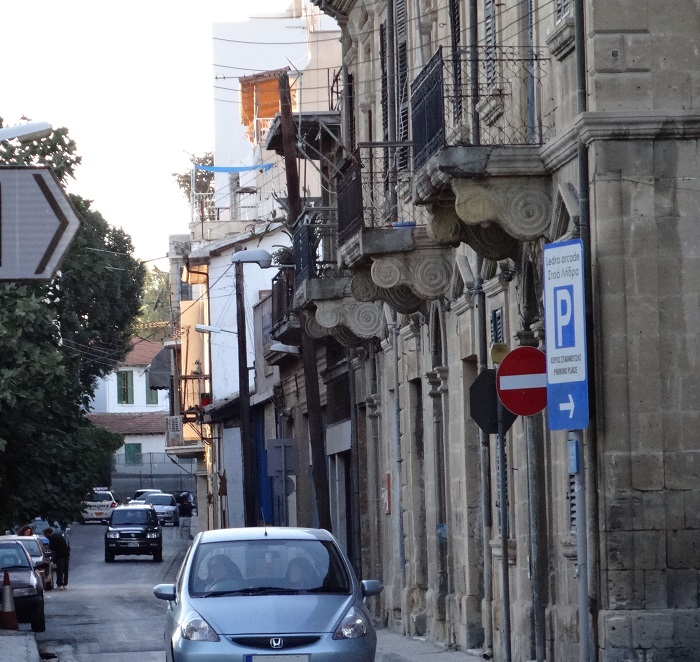
Traditional houses in Tabakhane neighborhood

At the last census, conducted in 2011, Tabakhane had a population of 299, a sizable increase from its population of 204 in 2001.

The neighborhood covers nine streets in the south-center of Nicosia, forming a compact area just west of Ledra Street. It stretches around Germanou Patron Street (formerly Usta Kadi), from its junction with Rigenis Street to that with Alexander the Great Street. The junction at Arsinoe Street is its centre.

According to the survey reported by George Jeffery (government architect) Tabakhane formerly extended as far west as Paphos Gate and was therefore close to the old site of the Tannery, which is now occupied by the Municipal Garden. But in 1912 the Quarter was reduced to its present bounds.

== Tabakhane Mesjid ==
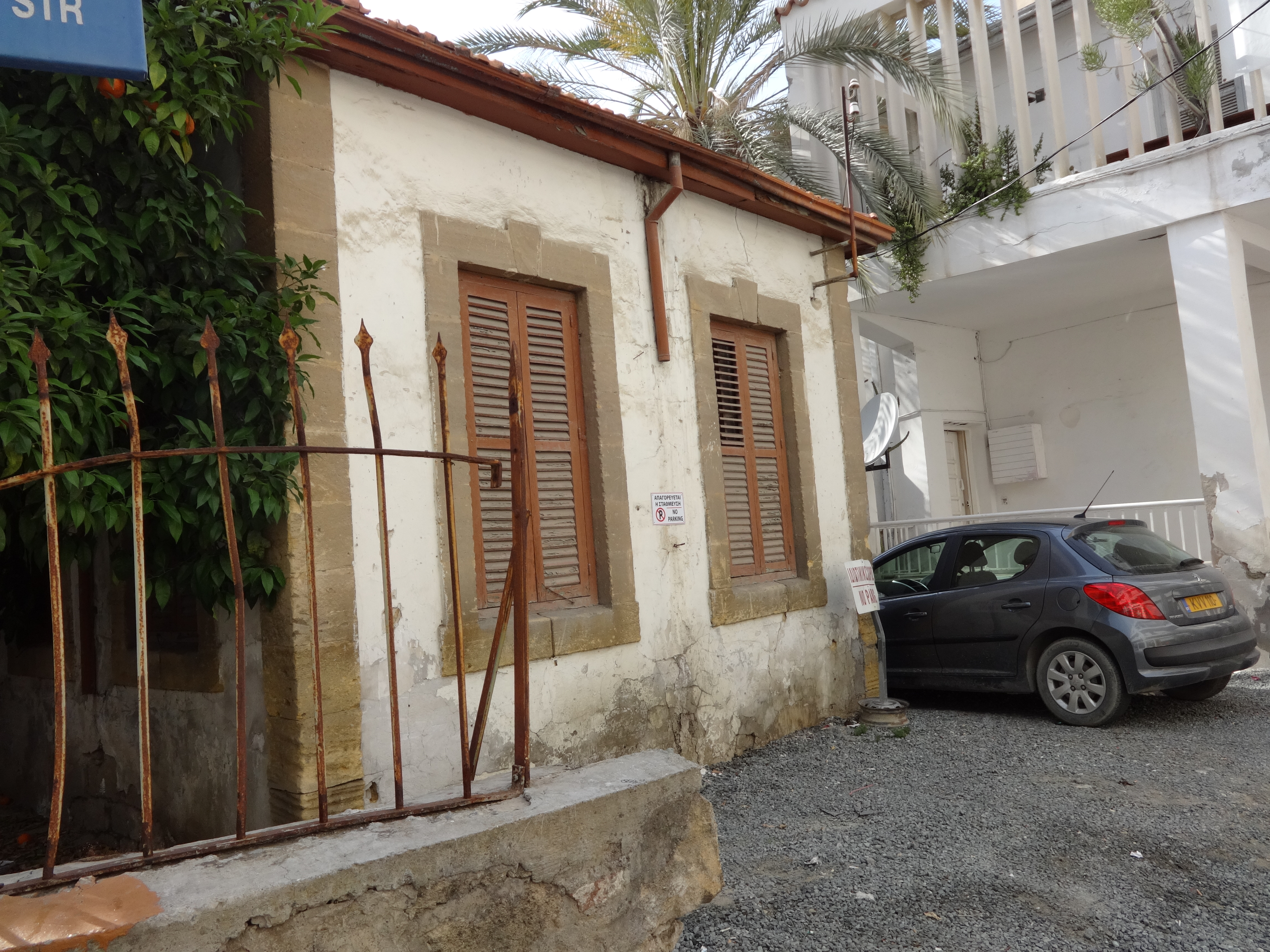
Tabakhane Mesjid

Tabakhane Mesjid, the mosque for the neighborhood (currently closed), is located in Arsinoes Street just east of its intersection with Pericles Street (formerly Kalkancı Street).

The tanners originally had two mosques; one at the tannery — where there was also a shrine to their patron divine, analogous to the patron saint of a guild or occupation in the West — and one in the residential area, namely Tabakhane Mesjid.

== History ==
Tabakhane is one of 24 historic neighborhoods within the walls of Nicosia. Many Turkish Cypriot tanners formerly worked at the tannery and lived nearby in Tabakhane.

During the Ottoman period it was counted as one of the Moslem quarters of Nicosia. Since then the Moslem character of the neighbourhood has waned, and in 1946, Tabakhane had a population of 757, consisting of 701 Greek Cypriots, twenty Turkish Cypriots, and 36 others. The last Turkish Cypriot in Tabakhane (Nezire Hanım of Pericles Street) died in 1960.

Map of Tabakhane Neighbourhood (1930s)

The population of Tabakhane during British rule in Cyprus was as follows:

Date	Population	% Turkish Cyp.
1891	287	20%
1901	543	7%
1911	528	7%
1921	585	3%
1931	661	4%
1946	757	3%

In 1912 the boundary was redefined thus: From the point on the outside wall of the fortifications facing Mukhtar Street along Mukhtar Street, Kiatip Zade Street, Imam Eff. Street, Kofteros Street, Kalkanji Street, Kiatip Zade Street, Barouti Street, Hj. Christo Street, Kalkanji Street, Hj. Zannetto Street, Hissar Street, right up to the outside wali of the fortifications and thence along the outside wall of the fortifications to the point facing Mukhtar Street.

These streets have subsequently been renamed:

Mukhtar Street: Basil Boulgaroktonos St.
Kiatip Zade Street: Arsinoes St.
Imam Eff. Street: Alexios Comnenos St.
Kofteros Street: Alexander the Great St.
Kalkanji Street: Pericles St.
Barouti Street: Phokionos St.
HajiChristo Street: Apollo St.
HajiZannetto Street: Rigenis St.
Hissar Street: Pal.Patron Germanos St.

== Tannery ==
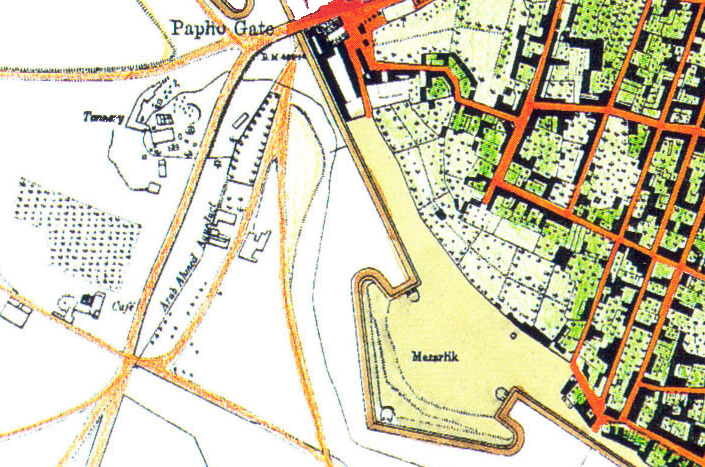
The location of the Tannery in 1885, just west of Paphos Gate

The tannery was originally located just outside the Paphos Gate, now the site of the Municipal Gardens. It was moved to the area of Köşklüçiftlik in 1886. The tannery workers were members of an ancient Moslem esnaf, or guild. Tanning, like butchery, requires the use of sharp knives, and Under Ottoman rule, it was a Muslim monopoly. The tanners worked within the framework of a traditional guild and had their own quarter of the city, Tabakhane. Work at the tannery was controlled by a council, represented on the Medji Idare (Nicosia district council).

The guild's monopoly was abolished in 1879 by order of the high commissioner.
