= Panagia, Nicosia =

Pallouriotissa Παλλουριώτισσα
- Village
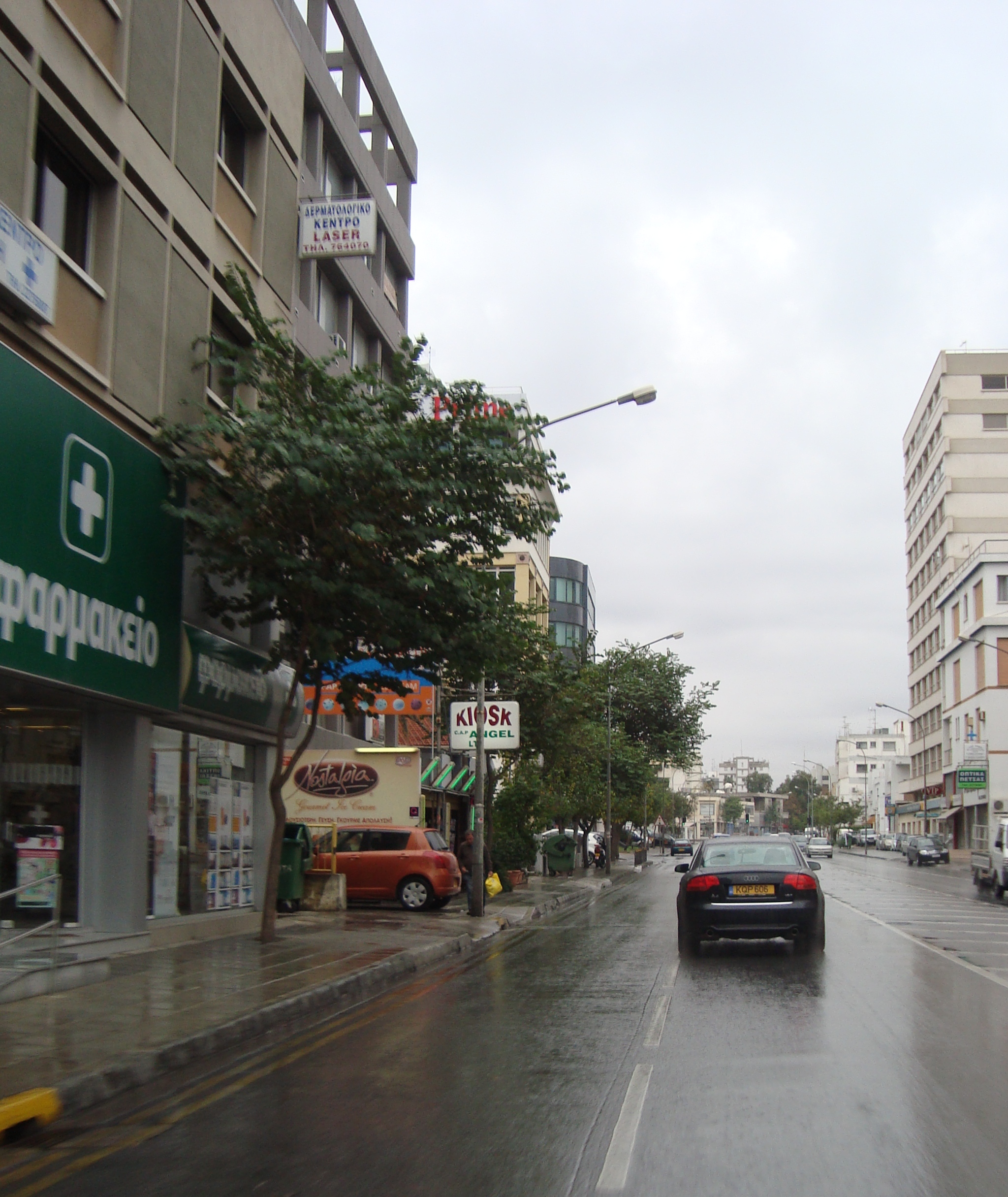
- Digeni Akrita avenue

- Location in Cyprus
- Coordinates: 35°10′28″N 33°22′37″E
- Country: Cyprus
- District: Nicosia District
- Municipality: Nicosia

Population (2011)
  - Total: 15,607

Pallouriotissa (Greek: Παλλουριώτισσα [locally [palːuˈr̥kotisːa]]) is an area of Nicosia, Cyprus, formerly an independent village, which was annexed to the municipality in 1968. It was subsequently divided into the quarters of Panayia (Panagia) and Saints Constantine and Helen (Agioi Konstantinos kai Eleni). As of 2011, their combined population was 15,607. Pallouriotissa is immediately south of Kaimakli.

== Etymology ==
Pallouriotissa, then a village east of the walled city, in 1885

The name refers to the plant Palliouros known today as Palloura in Cypriot Greek, i.e. the Jujube plant. According to popular tradition, an icon of the Virgin Mary (Panayia) was found hidden in the branches of a large palloura plant.

== History ==
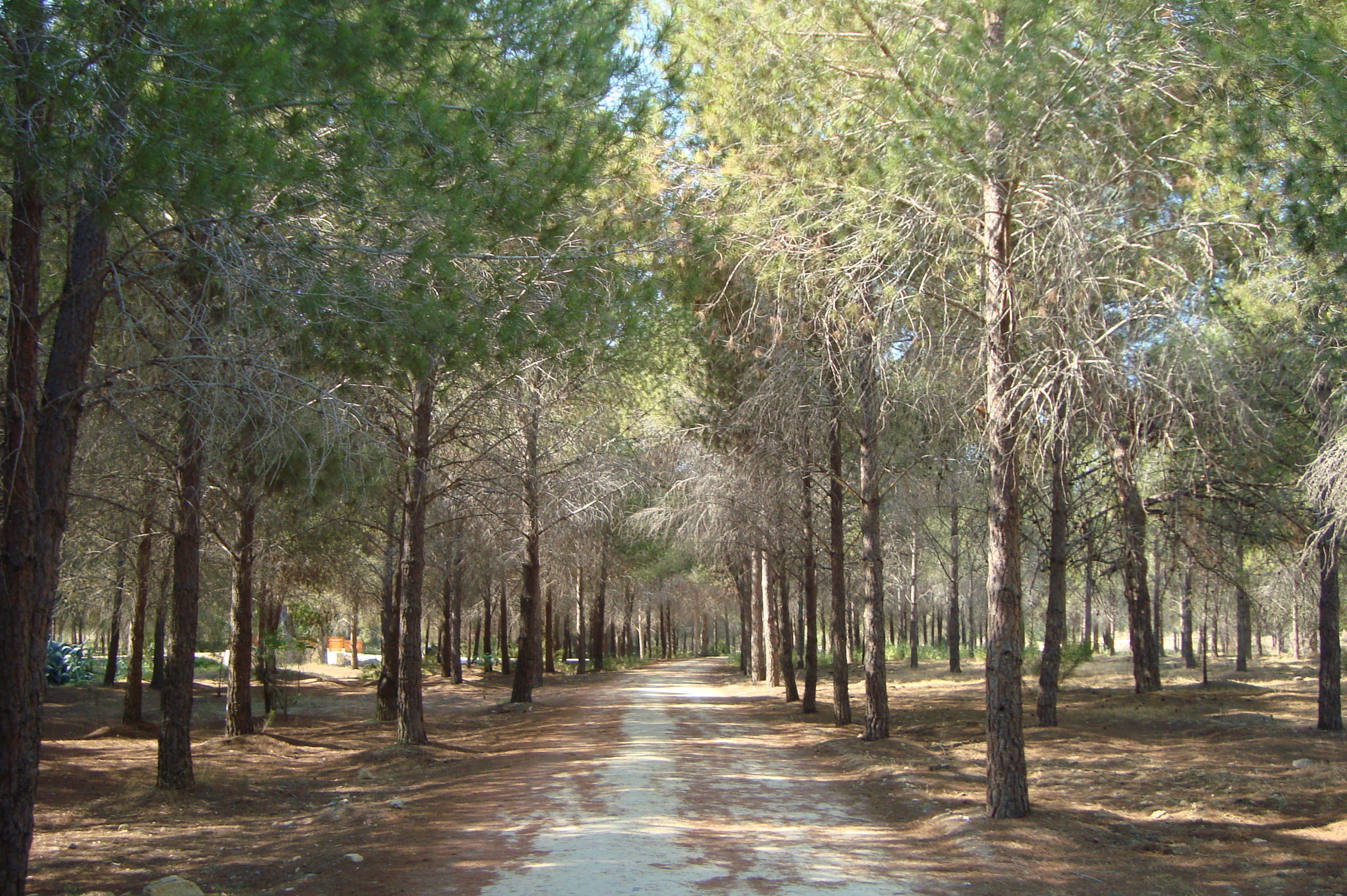
Alsos Academias Forest Park

The settlement of Pallouriotissa, developed around the (female) monastery of the Virgin Mary of Pallouriotissa during the period of Lusignan rule in Cyprus, situated about a mile east of Nicosia. The year of foundation of the monastery is not verified, but the writer Stephen Lusignan puts its inception in the late 4th century AD, citing as founder St. Macedonius, who succeeded after St. Trifyllios as Bishop of Ledra and participated in the First Ecumenical Council of 325 AD.

The first historically documented testimony to the monastery is found in a sacred text that was written shortly after the martyrdom of thirteen monks of Kantara. Also important is the reference made by Archimandrite Cyprian in "Chronological History of the island of Cyprus", based on the historical references of Stephen Lusignan, referring to two monasteries, those of Empress Helen and Pallouriotissa.

In 1567, the Venetians strengthened the defences of Nicosia by building new walls on a shorter circumference and demolishing all the buildings outside of these in the vicinity. Thus the monastery was demolished. Some time after the Ottoman conquest the monastery was rebuilt this time for males. Last abbot of the monastery was Chrisanthos. With his death in 1888, the monastery fell into debt because of large amounts spent for the repair of the church, the water supply and taxes. Much of the monastery church collapsed after a fire, probably in the mid 19th century.

Gradually the church became the parish church for the village and it was rebuilt in 1887 and extended retaining only the walls in the apse of the sanctuary. In May 1890, the church was ready and was inaugurated by Archbishop Sophronius.

Pallouriotissa had a population of 2,368 in 1946 and 7,200 in 1960.

== Landmarks ==
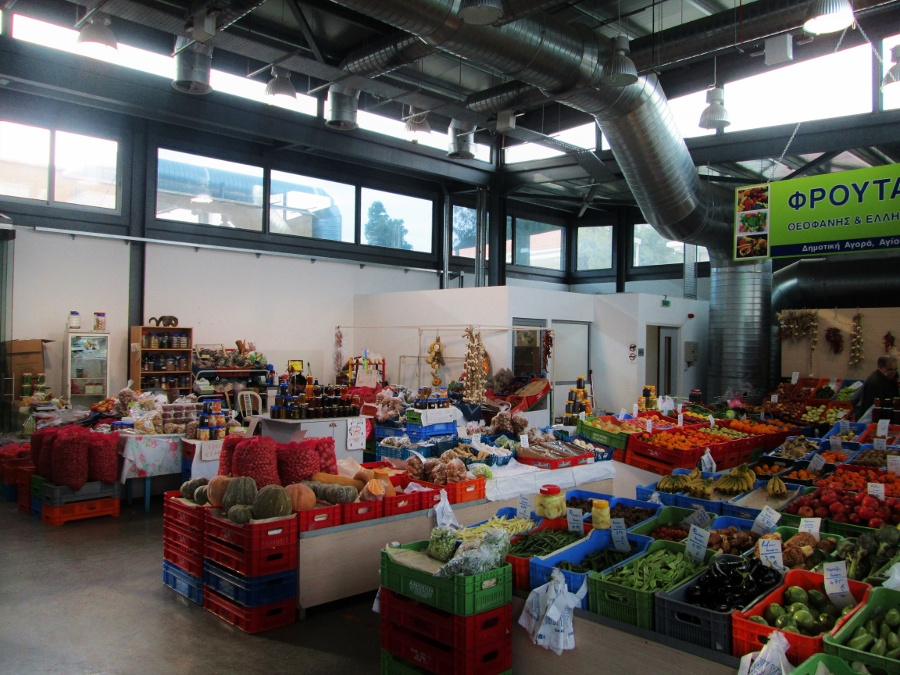
Saint Antonis food market

The principal landmarks are the church of Evangelistria' and also the churches of Panayia and of Saints Constantine and Helen.

The foundation stone of the church of Evangelistria was laid by Arch, Makarios III on 28 April 1961 and the first service was held on 21 November 1963. The church is the largest in Nicosia (of buildings that are still churches) and is used for national festivals and occasions.

The Church of the Virgin Mary, Panayia in Greek, which was rebuilt in 1887, forms the centre of the Neighbourhood and Parish of Panayia. It contains an icon of Christ dated to 1693 and the Iconostasis screen of the old church. In the churchyard lies part of a door lintel with two defaced coats of arms and part of the tracery of Gothic window. This is all that remains of the important medieval church that stood here.

The church of Saints Constantine and Helen is situated in the cemetery of the same name in Larnaca Avenue.
