= Taht-el-kale, Nicosia =

Taht-el-kale
- Ταχτ-ελ-Κάλε, Taht-el-Kale
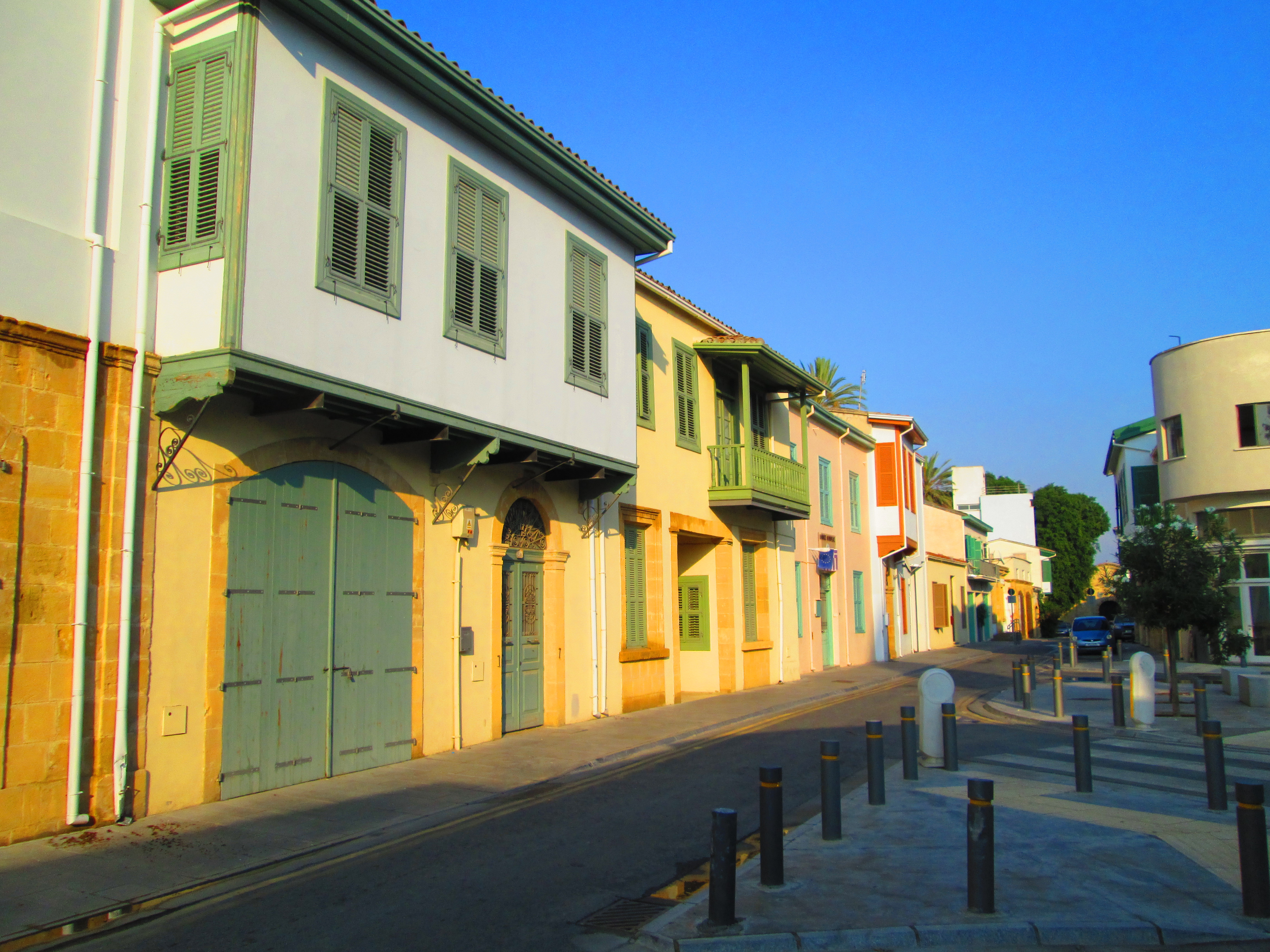
- Historical houses in the quarter

- Location in Cyprus
- Coordinates: 35°10′29″N 33°22′12″E
- Country: Cyprus
- District: Nicosia District
- Municipality: Nicosia

Population (2011)
  - Total: 826
- Time zone: UTC+2 (EET)
  - Summer (DST): UTC+3 (EEST)

Taht-el-kale (Greek: Τάχτ Ελ Καλέ; Turkish: Tahtakale) is a neighbourhood, quarter of Nicosia, Cyprus and the mosque situated therein.

At the last Census (2011) it had a population of 826, an increase from a population of 611 in 2001. It covers 28 streets in the eastern part of the municipal area of Nicosia, within and without the walls.

The population in 1946 was 1,433 consisting of 902 Greek Cypriots, 518 Turkish Cypriots and 13 others.

Taht-el-kale is the neighbourhood, near Famagusta Gate. The Ottomans named it as "Taht-el-kale", meaning the lower part of the fortress, i.e. Famagusta Gate. But the word was corrupted as "Tahtakale or Tahtagala", meaning wooden fortress. The street going from the gate to the west was called Çarşı (Market) Street, now called Famagusta Street. This is the main thoroughfare in the walled city part of the neighbourhood and it was rated by Louis Salvator in the 19th century as the second most important street in Nicosia after Trypiotis/Ledra Street.

Taht-el-kale was traditionally one of the biggest mixed neighbourhoods, but now the only sign of this coexistence is the Taht-el-kale Mosque and the Koran School.

== History ==
Taht-el-Kale is one of the 24 historic Neighbourhoods of Nicosia within the walls. In 1923 it was extended to encompass an area outside the walls adjacent to the Caraffa bastion

The population of Taht-el-Kale during British rule in Cyprus was as follows:

Date	Population	% Turkish Cyp.
1891	402	67%
1901	441	71%
1911	537	65%
1921	855	45%
1931	1197	43%
1946	1433	36%

There was a gradual diminution of the Turkish Cypriot and Moslem character of the Quarter during this period, caused to some extent by the expansion of the quarter beyond the walls.

== Taht el Kale Mosque ==
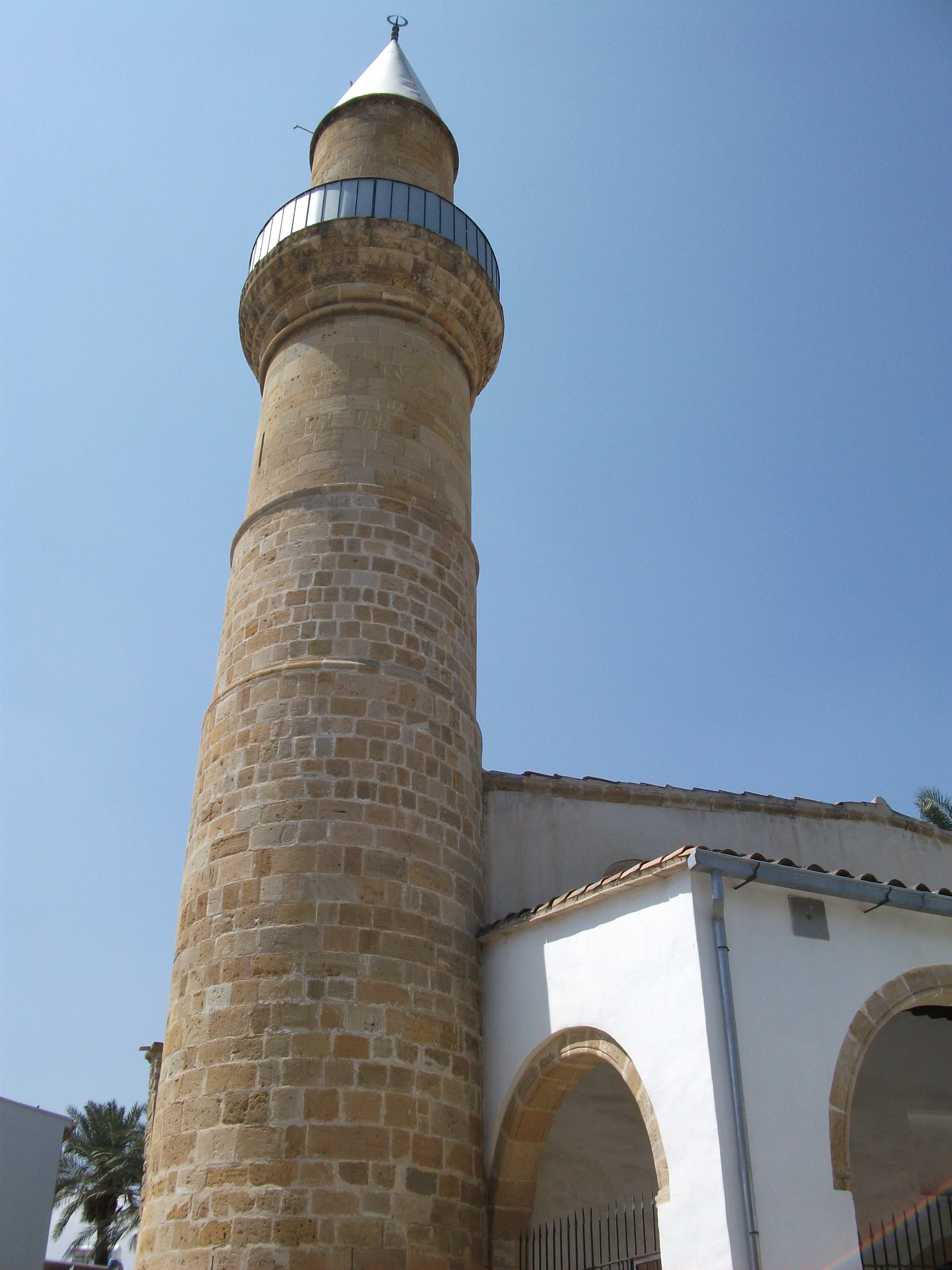
Mosque of Taht-el-Kale

The Taht-el-kale Mosque and the Koran School were built in 1826 by the Ottoman Governor Es-Seyyid Mehmet Agha, at the same place as an old mosque. There were also a small graveyard and a koran school for the minors, which had its first teacher appointed in 1594. The Evkaf Administration built shops on the site of the graveyard in the 1950s. In 1881, there was a fountain near the mosque, which was drawn by Louis Salvator, but it did not survive until the present day.

The mosque is very small and has a round vault behind Turkish lattice windows. It has three round arches in front and two at the sides. On the left side stands the minaret. Three Gothic arches support the roof, which is a rough new Turkish structure. The original minaret was cracked in 1936 and it was rebuilt in 1948. The mosque is located adjacent to Famagusta Street, formerly also called Taht-el-Kale, near its western end.

After being closed for 51 years, a service was conducted in the mosque on 3 June 2014, by Turkish Cypriot mufti Talip Atalay. Mufti Atalay visited the mosque after an invitation from Archbishop Chrysostomos as part of the Religious Track of the Cyprus Peace Process, an initiative under the auspices of the Embassy of Sweden Nicosia. The mufti was accompanied by the EVKAF Foundation's Chairperson Rauf Ersenal, a native of Taht-el kale neighbourhood, whose family fled the area in 1963 never to return.

== Other Landmarks ==
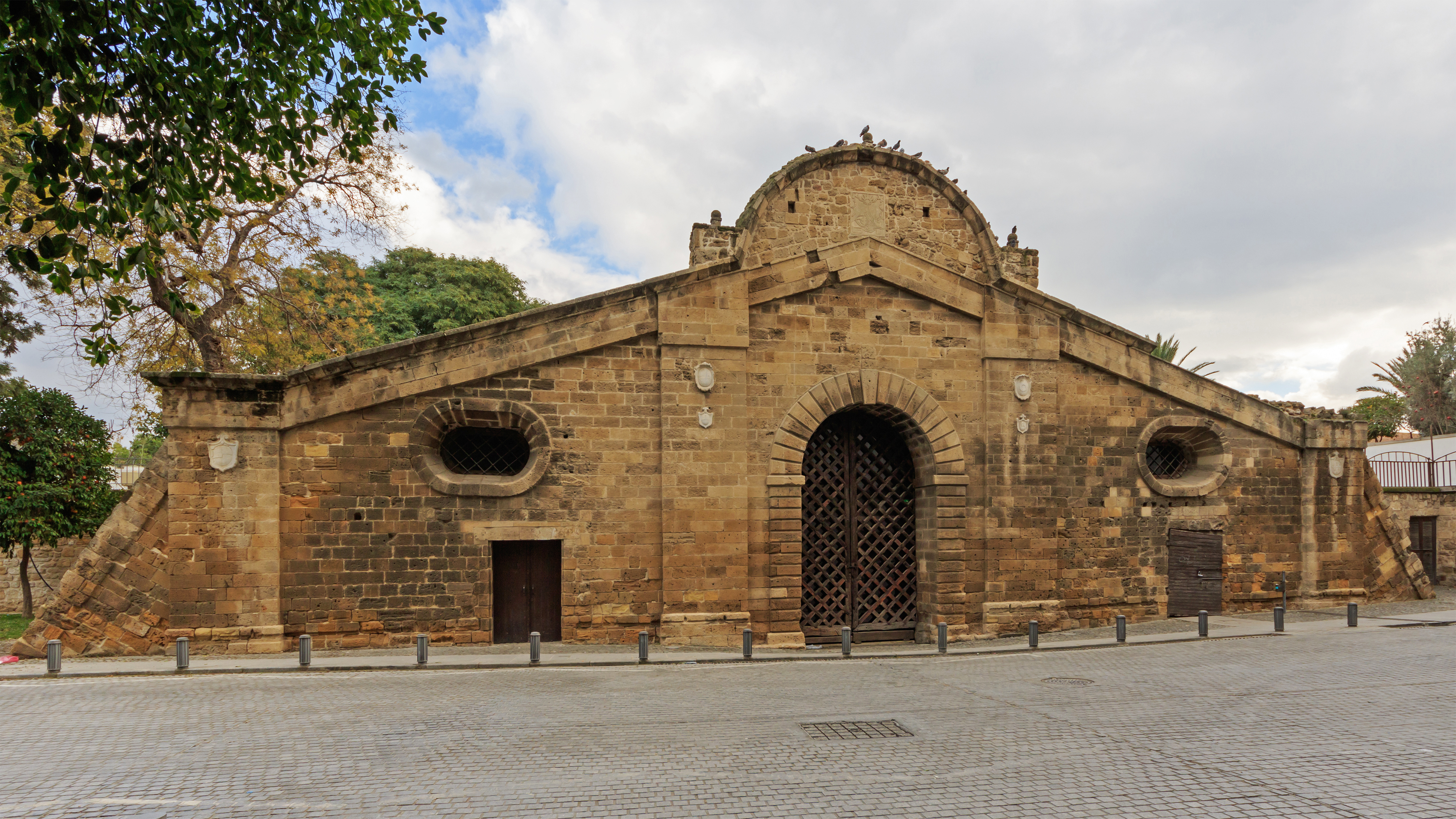
Famagusta Gate

The principal architectural monument remaining within this neighbourhood is the chief gate of the city : the Porta Giuliana, or " di sotto " of Fra Stefano Lusignano's " Chorograffia," known as Famagusta Gate in modern times. This construction, in the Venetian style has been copied from the famous Lazaretto Gate of Candia designed by Michael Sammicheli at the beginning of the 16th century, and consists of a vaulted passage through the earthwork rampart of the city with a carefully executed spherical dome, eleven metres in diameter, in its centre. The passageway is large enough for two vehicles to pass, and it is lighted by a circular opening in the centre of the dome in the style of the Pantheon at Rome. On either side of this passage appear to be entrances into chambers now blocked up. The external doorway of the Porta Giuliana is a small archway in the re-entering angle or " orecchione " of the Caraffa bastion now somewhat injured by breakage of the arch stones, and the ancient doors, etc., are missing. On the inner side of the gateway, facing the town, is an imposing facade.
