= Abdi Chavush =

Neighbourhood of Nicosia, Cyprus

- Abdi Chavush, Abdi Çavuş, Αμπντί Τσαούς
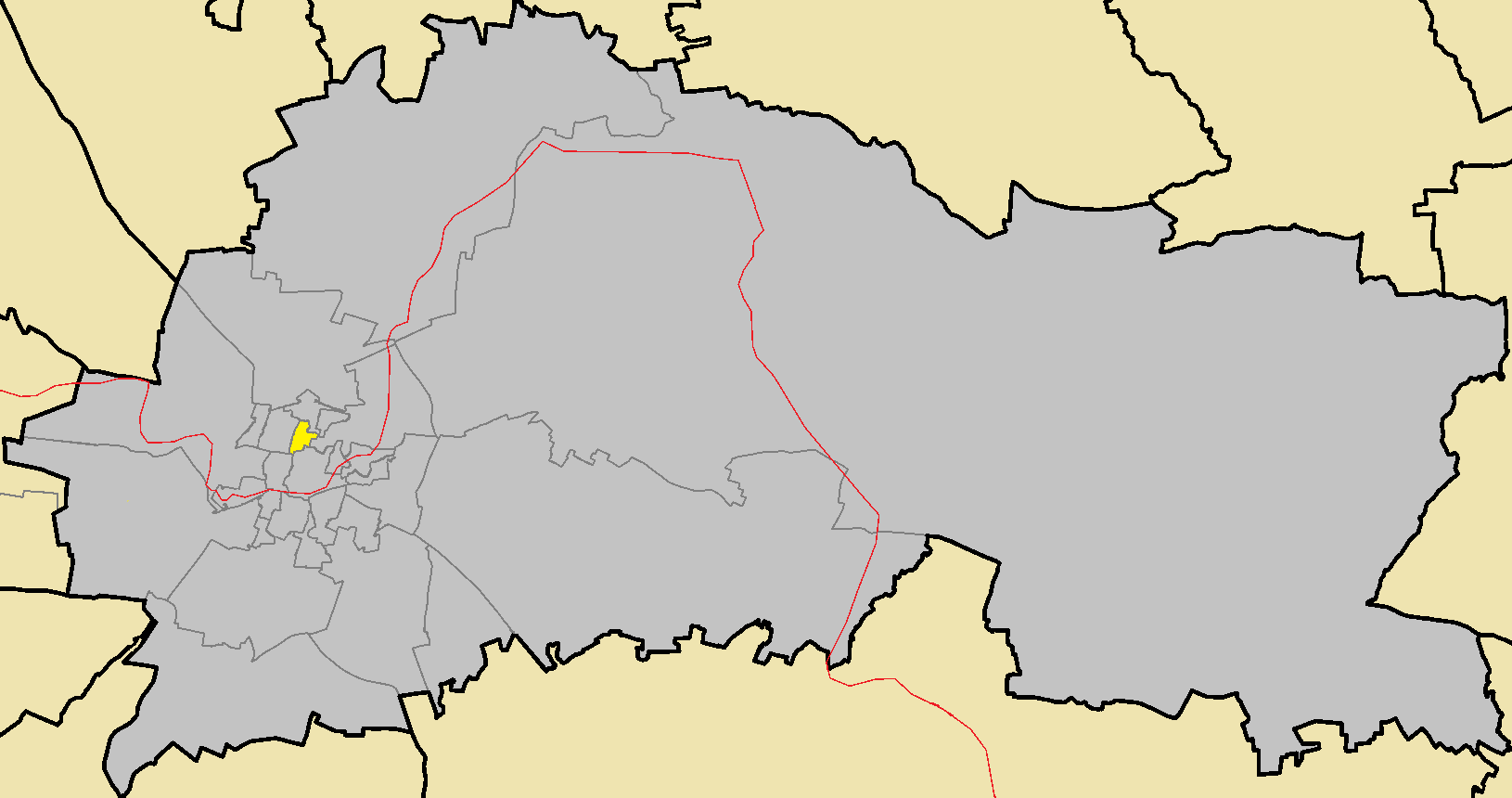

- Location in Cyprus
- Coordinates: 35°10′43.0″N 33°21′45.6″E
- Country: Cyprus
- District: Nicosia District
- Municipality: Nicosia

Population (2011)
  - Total: 568
- Time zone: UTC+2 (EET)
  - Summer (DST): UTC+3 (EEST)

Abdi Chavush (Turkish: Abdi Çavuş; Greek: 'Αμπντί Τσαούς') is a Neighbourhood, Quarter or Mahalle of Nicosia, Cyprus. It is named after Abdi Chavush, one of the generals in the Ottoman conquest of Cyprus in 1570. He was known as "Chawush" meaning sergeant, from which rank he would have been promoted.

== Location ==
Abdi Chavush is located in the north of Nicosia within the walls.

Ιt is bordered on the north by the quarter of Abu Kavouk, to the east by Yeni Jami and St. Luke, to the south by Ayia Sophia and Iplik Bazar–Korkut Effendi, and to the west by Ibrahim Pasha.

== Population ==
Population according to the Census taken in each year, where the quarter is separately reported.

Date	Tk Cyp	Gk Cyp	oth	Tk Cyp %	Total
1831	128			100.0%	128
1881 (male)					99
1881					215
1891	257	1		99.6%	258
1901	317	6		98.1%	323
1911	358	10		97.3%	368
1921	351	11		97.0%	362
1931	511	64		88.9%	575
1946	799	74	29	88.6%	902
2006					975
2011					568

Note: The 1831 Ottoman census only included males. The figure for males in 1881 is included for comparison. 1960 census report does not include figures for each Quarter.

== History ==
Abdi Chavush is one of the 24 historic quarters within the walls of Nicosia. During the Ottoman period it was counted as one of the Moslem quarters of Nicosia.

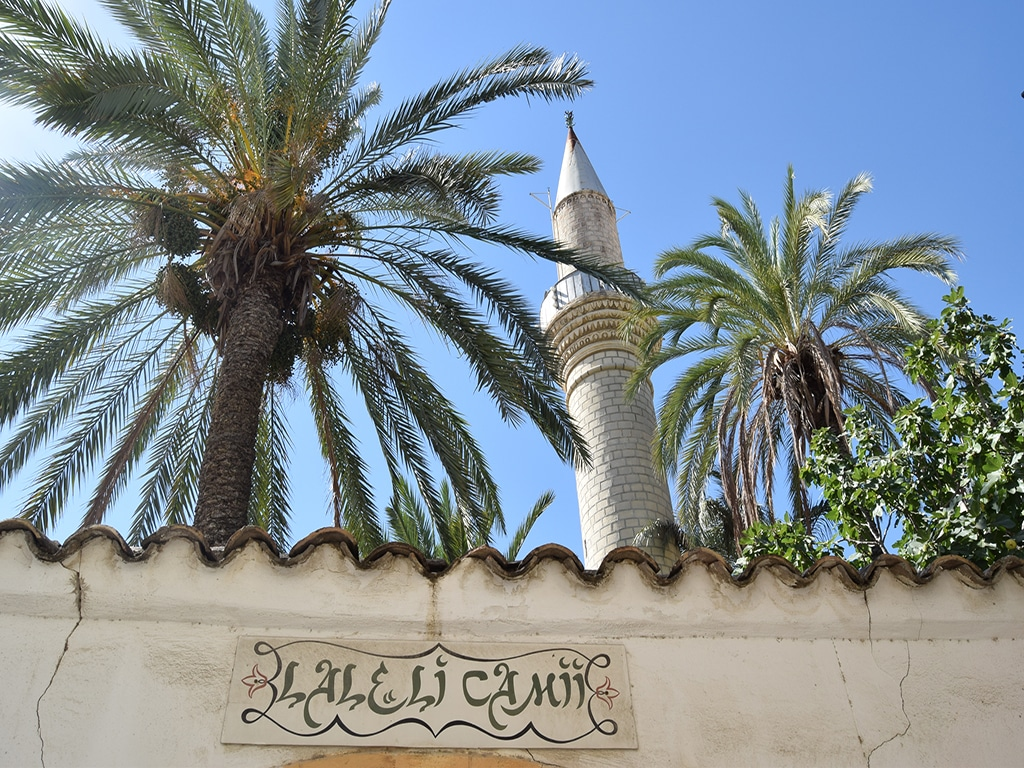
Laleli mosque

== Laleli Mosque ==
Laleli Mosque (Turkish: Laleli Camii) is located in Ali Ruhi Street, in the south of the quarter. Its name means "the Mosque with Tulips" and is thought to be derived from the tulip motifs adorning its original minaret. Its architecture indicates it was probably a medieval chapel. After the Ottoman conquest, it was initially converted to a small mosque or mesjid (mescit), but it was enlarged and converted to a mosque in the 19th century.
