= Büyük Hamam =

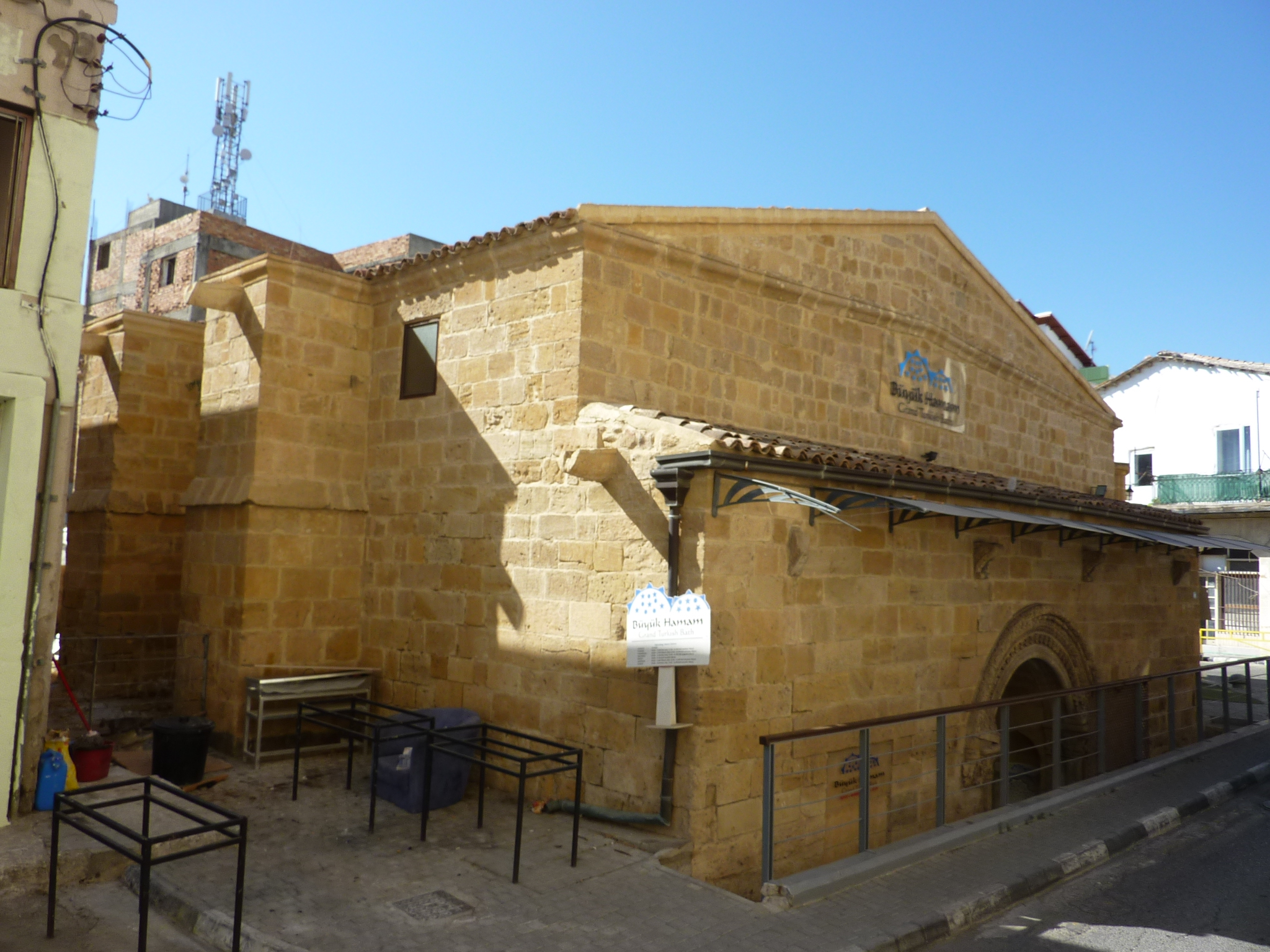
- Büyük Hamam

General information
- Location: Iplik Bazar–Korkut Effendi, North Nicosia
- Coordinates: 35.1768°N 33.3617°E
- Opened: 1309
- Owner: Evkaf Administration

Other information
- Facilities: Hamam (bathhouse)

Website
- buyukhamam.com

Büyük Hamam (Greek: Μπουγιούκ Χαμάμ Mpougioúk Chamám) is a hamam (bathhouse) in the Iplik Bazar–Korkut Effendi quarter of North Nicosia. It stands close to the İplik Pazarı Mosque. As a result of the rise of the ground of the surrounding areas over time, its door is now located around 2 meters below the ground level, and the bath rooms are 3 meters below. The building was constructed as the Lusignan church of St. George of the Latins in the 14th century, and was converted into a hamam during the Ottoman period.

== History ==
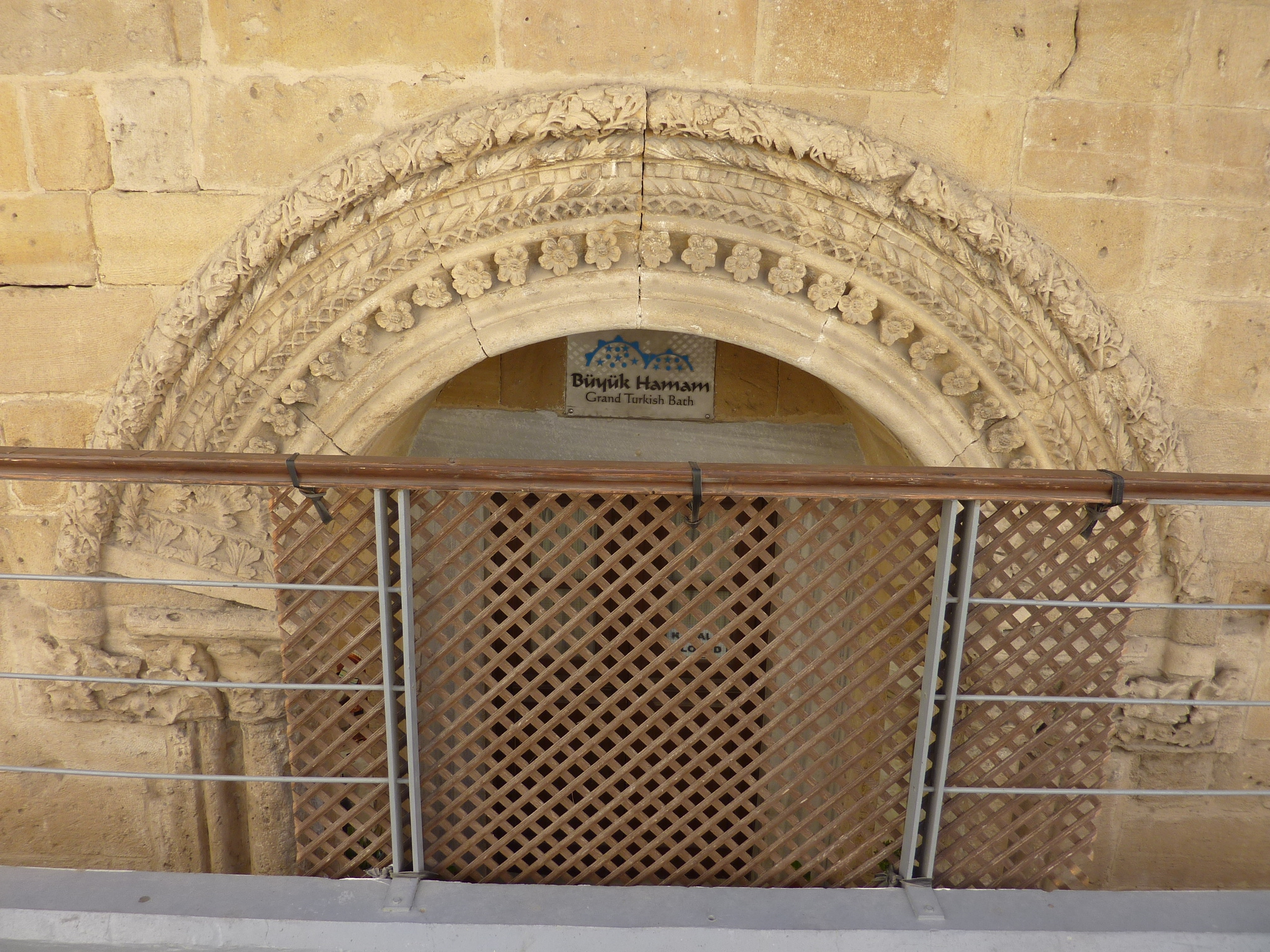
The old church portal

On the site of the bath, the Lusignan church of St. George of the Latins was constructed from 1306 to 1309, and opened with great festivities. The church was the site of two important events in the 14th century. On 10 November 1330, Nicosia was struck by a flood of the Pedieos River, which then flowed inside the city walls. The flood caused the death of 3,000 people and the place up to where the water of the river rose is still marked with a nail from the Lusignan period. On 17 January 1369, the church was the site of a conspiracy when some knights plotted to kill King Peter I of Cyprus. According to Kevork Keshishian, the church was in close proximity of the royal palace and thus was of great importance, and its parishioners were called "Halfcastes" as they were children of mixed marriages between the Latins and the Syrians.

According to George Jeffery, although some have suggested that this building itself is the 14th-century church of St. George of the Latins, no evidence is forthcoming for such an identification, and this theory overlooks the fact that although the building much resembles a mediaeval church in appearance it does not conform to the invariable planning of such buildings. Instead of lying east and west it is built north and south in a manner which would have been almost impossible until perhaps the period of the Venetian rule.

The building was rebuilt as a hamam between 1571 and 1590 during the first years of the Ottoman rule in the island. It belonged to the foundation of Mustafa Pasha and individuals rented it from the foundations to administer it. For instance, a janissary, Hacı Mehmed Racil, is recorded as renting the bath for 16 years in 1593. During the Ottoman period, it was a popular social center where women socialized, exchanged news and ate. In 1891, when the marble plaques in the "sıcaklık" section were being disassembled, one of the plaques was revealed to be a medieval tombstone and was relocated to a museum. The original boiler of the bath was made of stone, but when the operator complained that it required too much wood to heat it and that it reduced profits, it was replaced by a copper one.

The bath was renovated in 2007 and 2008 with the help of the UNDP and USAID, with the technique used highlighting the original qualities of the bathhouse.

== Architecture ==
The bath consists of three sections: "soyunmalık", where the customers take off their clothes, "ılıklık", meaning "warm place" and "sıcaklık", meaning "hot place". According to Haşmet Muzaffer Gürkan, the "soyunmalık" section consists of the original remains of the Latin church. A large dome and central massage platform are present in the "sıcaklık" area, which is considered the main section of the bath. The ashlar building has one floor. The arch at the entry has Gothic reliefs and decorative elements as it is a remnant from the Latin church, along with the windowsills in the "soyunmalık" section.

== Current use ==
The building is owned by the Evkaf Administration, a non-profit organization, specifically the "Lala Mustafa Paşa Vakfı". It is the only original hamam active in Northern Cyprus. It is an important attraction for tourists, who use it to experience a traditional Islamic "Turkish" bath. It offers traditional methods of peeling and massage with aromatic oils and foam. Turkish Cypriots themselves do not show great interest in the bath. Some hours of the bath are reserved for locals, while some are for tourists; the hours for locals are sex-segregated as some days are reserved for women while some are reserved for men, while those for tourists are not.
