= Eaved House =

Coordinates: 35.17625°N 33.36542°E

The Eaved House (Turkish: Saçaklı Ev) is a mansion in the Selimiye quarter of North Nicosia. It is located to the southeast of Selimiye Mosque. It is named after its wide eaves that support its hall protruding into the street.

Its year of construction is not known. The building is L-shaped and surrounds an inner courtyard. The lower floor displays Lusignan architecture, whereas the upper floor displays the Ottoman architectural style and was developed as a house during the Ottoman period upon the remains of a medieval building. In 1932, it underwent a large-scale reparation, indicated by the date inscribed on the entrance gate, which was installed during this reparation.

The hall of the building has many windows and was built in the Baghdadi style, whilst other parts are made of stone or adobe. In time, large rooms in the lower floor were divided into smaller ones and doors were created in their walls along the street so that they were converted into shops. The building was nationalized in 1986 and restoration works began in 1994. During these works, later additions to the building were removed, enabling its use as an art gallery, and generally, a center of artistic activities. It was opened officially as the Eaved House Center of Culture and Arts on 23 December 1996.
