= Ibrahim Pasha, Nicosia =

Neighbourhood of Nicosia, Cyprus

Ιbrahim Pasha
- Ιbrahim Pasha, İbrahimpaşa, Ιμπραχίμ Πασά
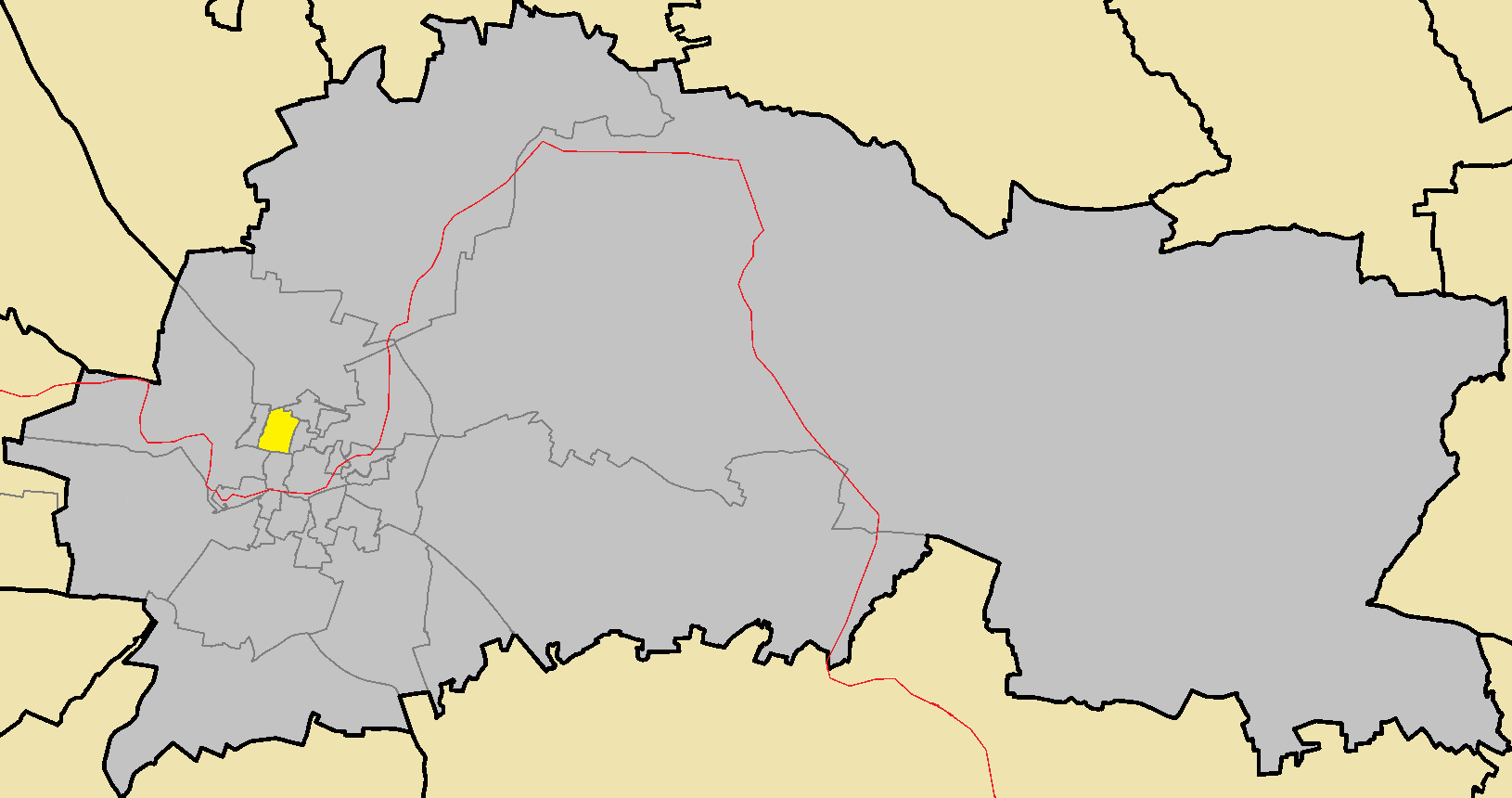

- Location in Cyprus
- Coordinates: 35°10′47″N 33°21′41″E
- Country: Cyprus
- District: Nicosia District
- Municipality: Nicosia

Population (2011)
  - Total: 566
- Time zone: UTC+2 (EET)
  - Summer (DST): UTC+3 (EEST)

Ιbrahim Pasha (Turkish: İbrahimpaşa; Greek: Ιμπραχίμ Πασά) is a Neighbourhood, Quarter or Mahalle of Nicosia, Cyprus. It is named after Ιbrahim Pasha, one of the leaders in the Ottoman conquest of Cyprus in 1570.

== Location ==
Ιbrahim Pasha is located in the north of Nicosia within the walls.

Ιt is bordered on the north by the quarter of Neapolis, which is outside the walled city, to the east by Ak Kavuk and Abdi Chavush, to the south by Iplik Bazar–Korkut Effendi and Arab Ahmet, and to the west by Mahmut Pasha.

== Population ==
Population according to the Census taken in each year, where the quarter is separately reported.

| Date | Tk Cyp | Gk Cyp | oth | Tk Cyp % | Total |
|---|---|---|---|---|---|
| 1831 | 208 | | | 100.0% | 208 |
| 1881(male) | | | | | 183 |
| 1881 | | | | | 385 |
| 1891 | 366 | 25 | | 93.6% | 391 |
| 1901 | 463 | 33 | | 93.3% | 496 |
| 1921 | 773 | 101 | | 88.4% | 874 |
| 1931 | 1055 | 118 | | 90.0% | 1172 |
| 1946 | 1539 | 650 | 145 | 65.9% | 2334 |
| 2006 | | | | | 675 |
| 2011 | | | | | 566 |

Note: The 1831 Ottoman census only included males. The figure for males in 1881 is included for comparison. 1960 census report does not include figures for each Quarter.

== History ==
Ιbrahim Pasha is one of the 24 historic quarters within the walls of Nicosia. During the Ottoman period it was counted as one of the moslem quarters of Nicosia.

The quarter was the site of the Lusignan palace that was the Venetian seat of government for Cyprus (Palazzo del Governo) and, subsequently, the Konak or Saray (palace) of the Turkish governor. This was located on the north side of the square of the Saray - Sarayönü Square. However, in 1904, under British rule, this was demolished as, because of its ruinous condition, it was too dangerous to use. In its place were erected the Nicosia Law Courts.

In 1923 the quarter was extended to encompass an extensive area outside the walls,. Then in 2010 that part of the quarter outside the walls was erected into the new quarter of Neapolis. Thus Ibrahim Pasha returned to being one of quarters confined entirely within the walled city.

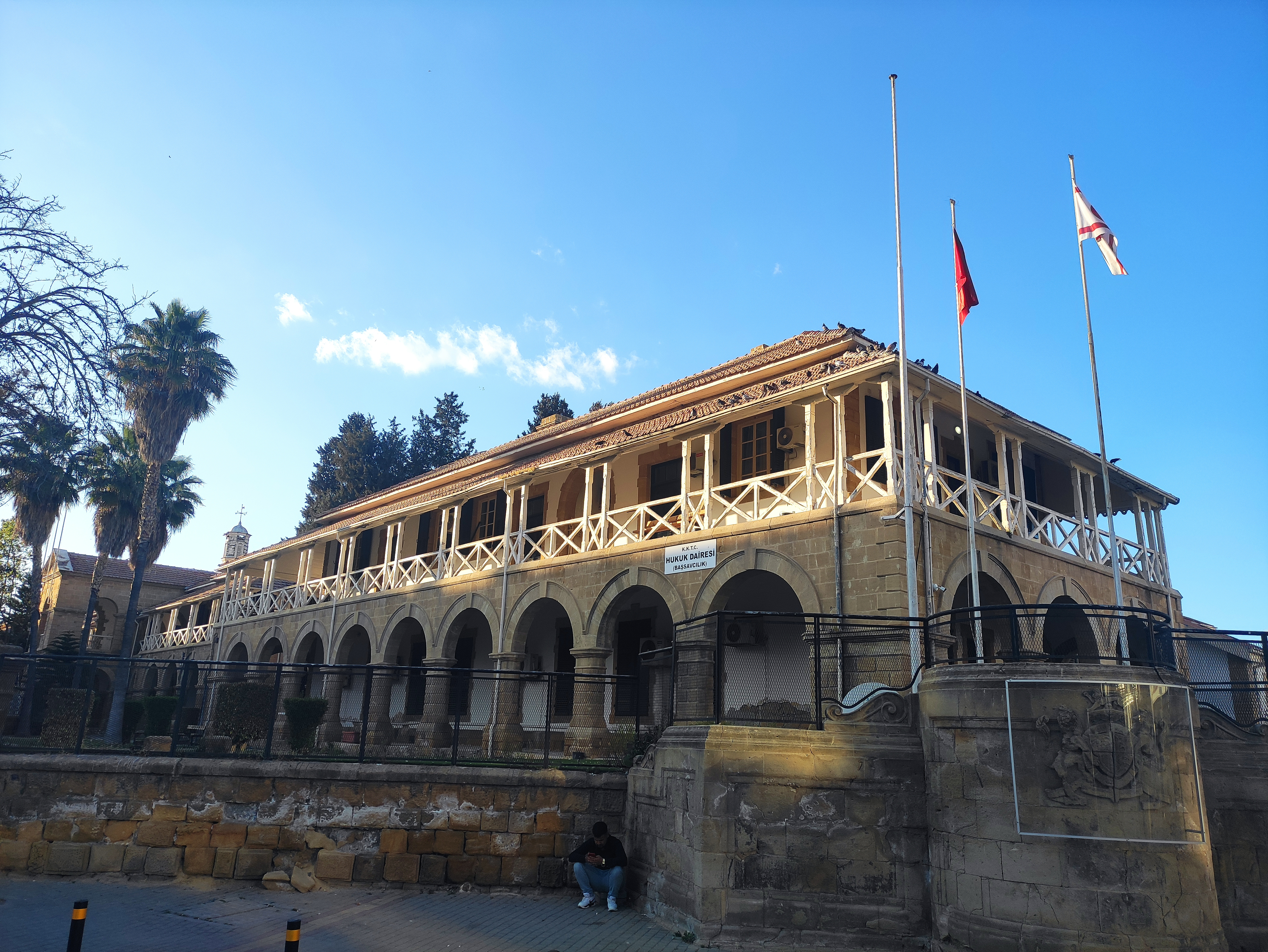
Law Courts in the south of the quarter, on the site of the former Venetian and Turkish palace

== Landmarks ==
The quarter extends from Kyrenia Gate in the north to Sarayönü Square in the south, neither of which are within its bounds. Connecting them is Kyrenia Street, which runs through the centre of the quarter.

=== Nicosia Law Courts ===
Facing Sarayönü Square at the southern boundary of the quarter are the Nicosia Law Courts, built in the old British colonial style. When the former palace was demolished in 1904, its gateway and a number of sculptures and other pieces were dismantled and are now in the Lapidary Museum in Haydar Pasha quarter. The new building was designed in 1899 by Charles Bellamy, the Director of Public Works. By the 1920s, the building was too small for the needs of the administration and new blocks were added to the east and west of the central building.

=== Mosque of the Mevlevi Dervishes ===
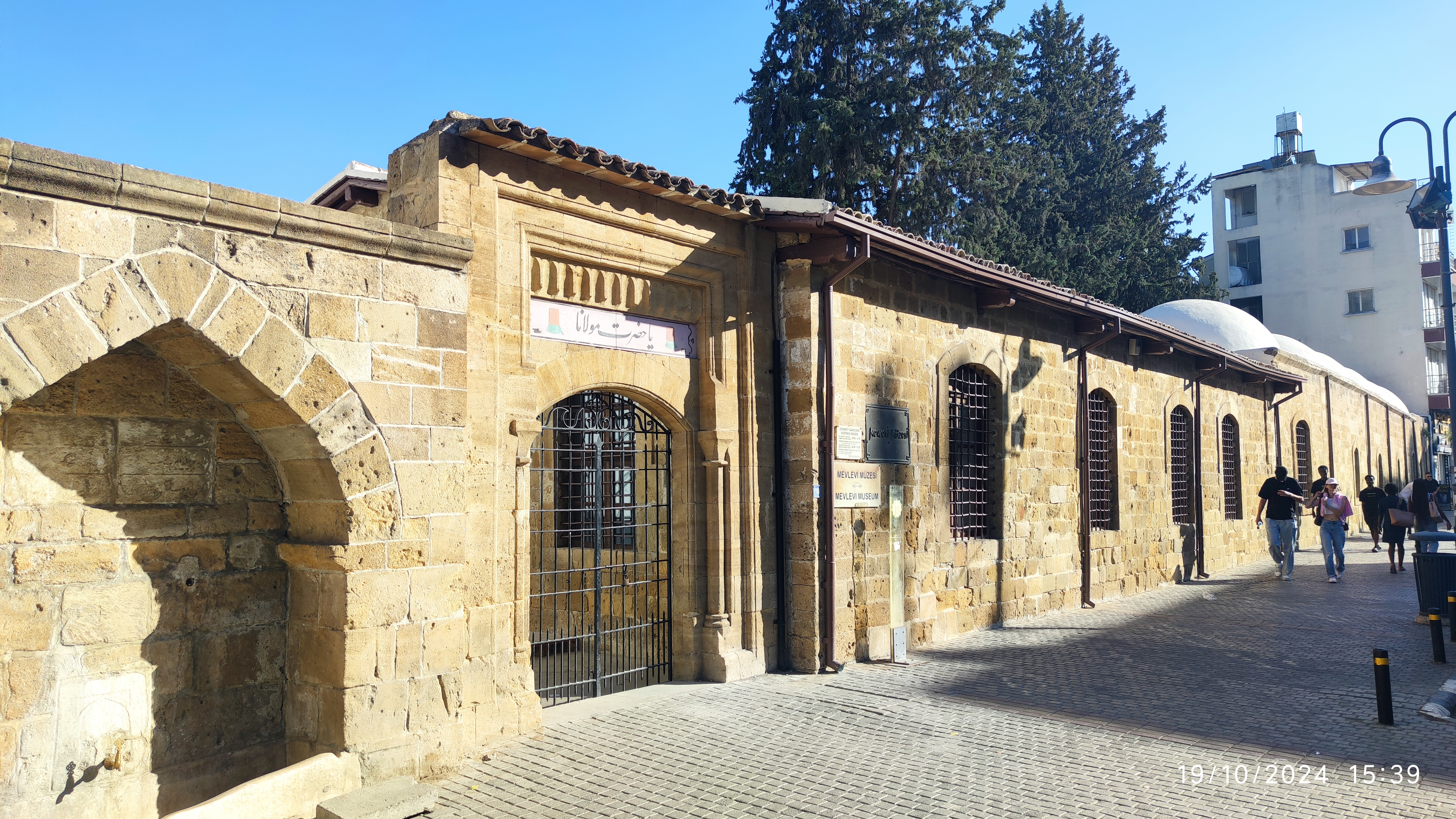
Mevlevi Tekke Museum

In Kyrenia Street near Kyrenia Gate is the former mosque or tekke of the Mevlevi Dervishes, the Mevlevi Tekke Museum. This consists of buildings within a small enclosure. Within its garden there is an inscription to a member of the Venetian governing council of Cyprus in the time of Governor Francesco Coppo. Until 1954 it was used by the Mevlevi Order but is now a museum, one of the important historical religious buildings of Cyprus.
