= Tomb of İttik Dede =

Mausoleum in Nicosia, Cyprus

- İttik Dede Türbesi
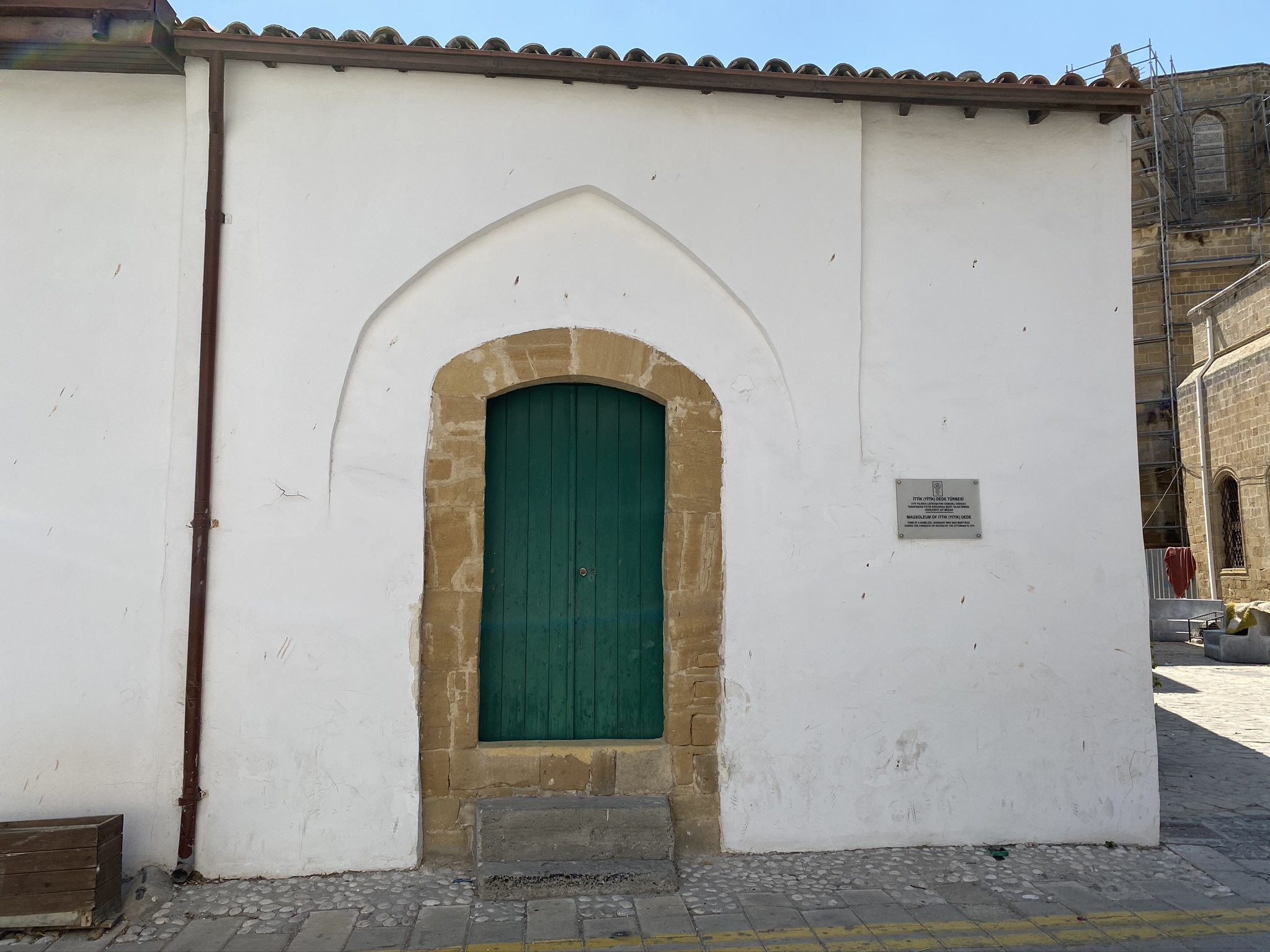
- The view of the front façade of İttik Dede's tomb facing Kütüphane Street (August 2020)
- Interactive map of the Tomb of İttik Dede area

General information
- Type: Mausoleum
- Location: Kütüphane Street, Selimiye, Nicosia, Cyprus
- Coordinates: 35.176386°N 33.365264°E
- Renovated: 1985, 2014

Technical details
- Floor count: 1

The tomb of İttik Dede (Turkish: İttik Dede Türbesi), also known as the tomb of Yitik Dede (Turkish: Yitik Dede Türbesi) or the tomb of İsmail Çavuş (Turkish: İsmail Çavuş Türbesi), is an Ottoman mausoleum located in the northern part of Nicosia in Cyprus. It is situated in the Selimiye neighborhood, on the south side of the Selimiye Square.

It is a single-room rectangular structure containing a wooden-chest tomb. There are different accounts regarding the identity of İttik Dede, who is buried in this tomb. It is believed that he was a soldier who lost his life in the conflicts in Nicosia during the Ottoman Empire's 1570 Cyprus Campaign. The tomb, which was used as a residence by various individuals in the 19th and 20th centuries, was restored in 1985 and 2014. The tomb, which historically served as a place of vow, had rags tied to the iron bars of its window.

== History ==
=== İttik Dede and narratives ===
There are no existing records about the identity of İttik Dede, who is believed to have been a "martyr", and what is known about him is based on various accounts. According to the most widely accepted narrative, İttik Dede was born in the Peloponnese region of Greece and fought for the Ottoman forces during the Cyprus Campaign. He lost his life during street battles in the location where the tomb stands today in 1570. It is thought that he fought alongside Moravizade Ahmet Efendi, who would later become the first imam of the Selimiye Mosque.

The term "ittik" in the name of the tomb is the Cypriot Turkish equivalent of the word "yitik" (meaning 'lost') in Anatolian Turkish. According to Tuncer Bağışkan, these individuals were commonly referred to as "ittik" because there were no records kept about them and they were believed to not be seeking fame or glory. Ismail Güleç suggests that the term "yitik" may have been used because the grave belonged to a soldier whose identity could not be determined during the battle, or it may have been a place where a missing soldier disappeared without being found alive or dead, or the term "yitik" could have been used because the exact location of the deceased person's death was not known.
