= Laleli Mosque, Nicosia =

Mosque in North Nicosia, Northern Cyprus

Laleli Mosque
- Laleli Camii
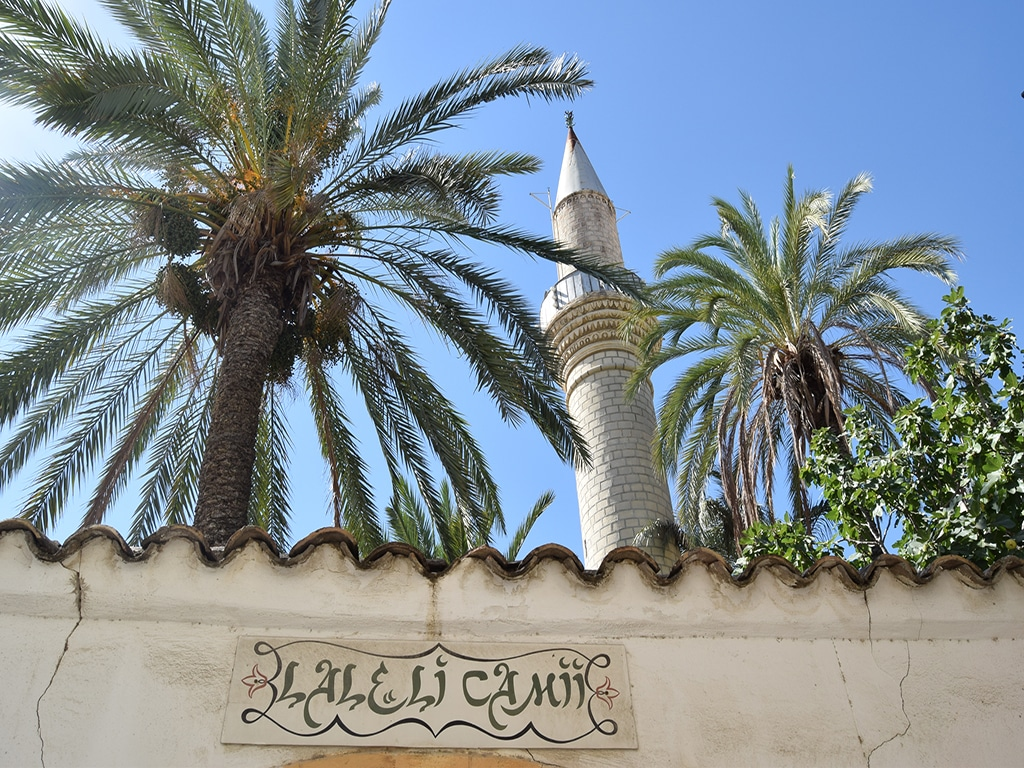
- Laleli Mosque, as seen from Laleli Camii Street

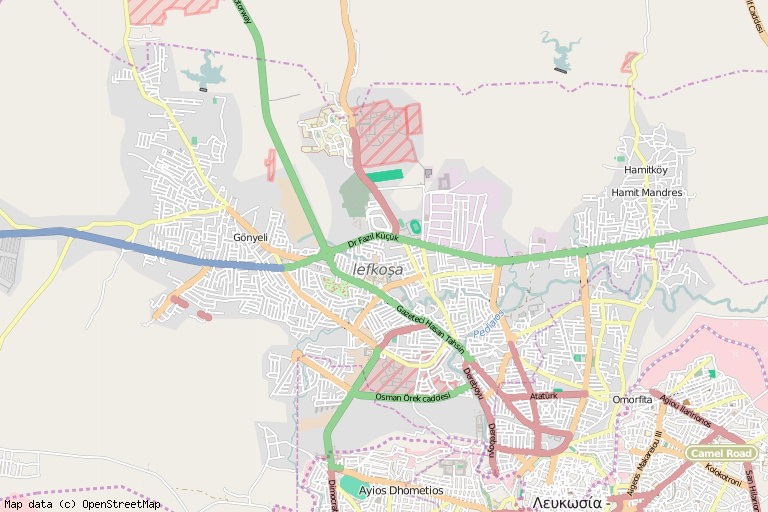
- Location within North Nicosia

Religion
- Affiliation: Islam
- Branch/tradition: Sunni
- Ownership: Evkaf Administration

Location
- Location: Abdi Çavuş, Nicosia, Cyprus
- Interactive map of Laleli Mosque
- Coordinates: 35°10′43.0″N 33°21′45.6″E

Architecture
- Funded by: Ali Ruhi Efendi
- Completed: 1827
- Minaret: 1

Laleli Mosque (Turkish: Laleli Camii) is a mosque in the Abdi Chavush quarter of the walled city of Nicosia, currently located in North Nicosia. It is located on Ali Ruhi Street. Its name, meaning "the Mosque with Tulips", is thought to be derived from the tulip motifs adorning its original minaret. Originally a small medieval chapel, it was enlarged and converted to a mosque in the 19th century.

== History ==
It is understood from the mosque's architecture that the building was originally a medieval chapel. After the Ottoman conquest, it was initially converted to a small mosque without a minaret (mescit), and was known as "Laleli Cami-i Minareli Mescidi" in the 18th century. In the late 20th century, a marble inscription dated to 1742-43 was found in a building at the southwestern corner of the mosque's courtyard. Written in the talik style by a calligrapher named "Ârif", the inscription revealed the existence of a teacher's school ("Laleli Cami-i Minareli Mescit Muallimhâne Mektebi") at the site at the time.

In 1827, it was enlarged by the addition of a minaret, minbar, mihrab, a new ceiling and a narthex (son cemaat yeri) and thus converted into a full mosque. The construction was financed by Ali Ruhi Efendi, the governor of Cyprus at the time, and the mosque was inscribed amongst the property of the newly founded Ali Ruhi Efendi Foundation on 24 December 1827 for maintenance. The responsibility for the maintenance changed hands over the course of the 19th century, as it was recorded amongst the property of Seyit Mehmet Ağa Foundation in 1906.

Ali Ruhi Efendi also had a primary school (sıbyan mektebi) constructed next to the mosque. In 1893 it was reported that the school consisted of a small room next to the mosque and was in disrepair, meaning that 80 children had to study in crowded and unhealthy conditions. The inhabitants of the Abdi Çavuş quarter requested that the Evkaf Administration enlarge the school, and a renowned constructor of the time, Nikolaki Kalla, was entrusted with the construction. An arch was added to enlarge the building. The next mention of the school building was recorded in the 1930s, when the building, then in the inventory of Debbağ Derviş Efendi Foundation, was rented out to a certain M. Sadık, who used it as a sewing school for girls. No trace of the building survives to this day. A marble inscription that stood on its wall and praised Ali Ruhi Efendi was removed in 1965 and placed in the Mevlevi Tekke Museum.

The mosque was repaired in the late 19th century by the Ottoman Imperial Ministry of Religious Foundations (Turkish: Evkaf-ı Hümayun Nezareti). A new minbar, which stands to this day, was ordered in 1895 from carpenter Hacı Hasan in exchange for a payment of £4. The mosque was further repaired by Nikolaki Kalla in 1908.

The minaret of the mosque was demolished in 1978-79 as it was "dangerous" and replaced with the current one.

== Architecture ==
The mosque lies in its separate garden, segregated from the rest of the neighbourhood with a high wall. The garden is entered via an arched gate. The mosque is rectangular in structure and has a length of 12.85 m and a width of 3.30 m. The narthex (son cemaat yeri) lies to the north and has three pointed arches. The entrance to the prayer area (harim) is through another pointed arch, above which is an inscription dated 1827 that praises Ali Ruhi Efendi. To the east of the prayer area lies the apse of the former chapel. The painted mihrab has decorations of flowers and leaves. A wooden women's area (kadınlar mahfili) is accessed via a door and a wooden staircase in the western part of the mosque.

The original minaret of the mosque was made of cut stone and its balcony (şerefe) was ornamented. The current minaret at the northeastern side does not retain any of its characteristics.

In the garden stands a fountain constructed in 1826-27 by Ali Ruhi Efendi with an inscription that dedicates the fountain to his mother.
