= Bedesten, Nicosia =

Historical building in North Nicosia, North Cyprus

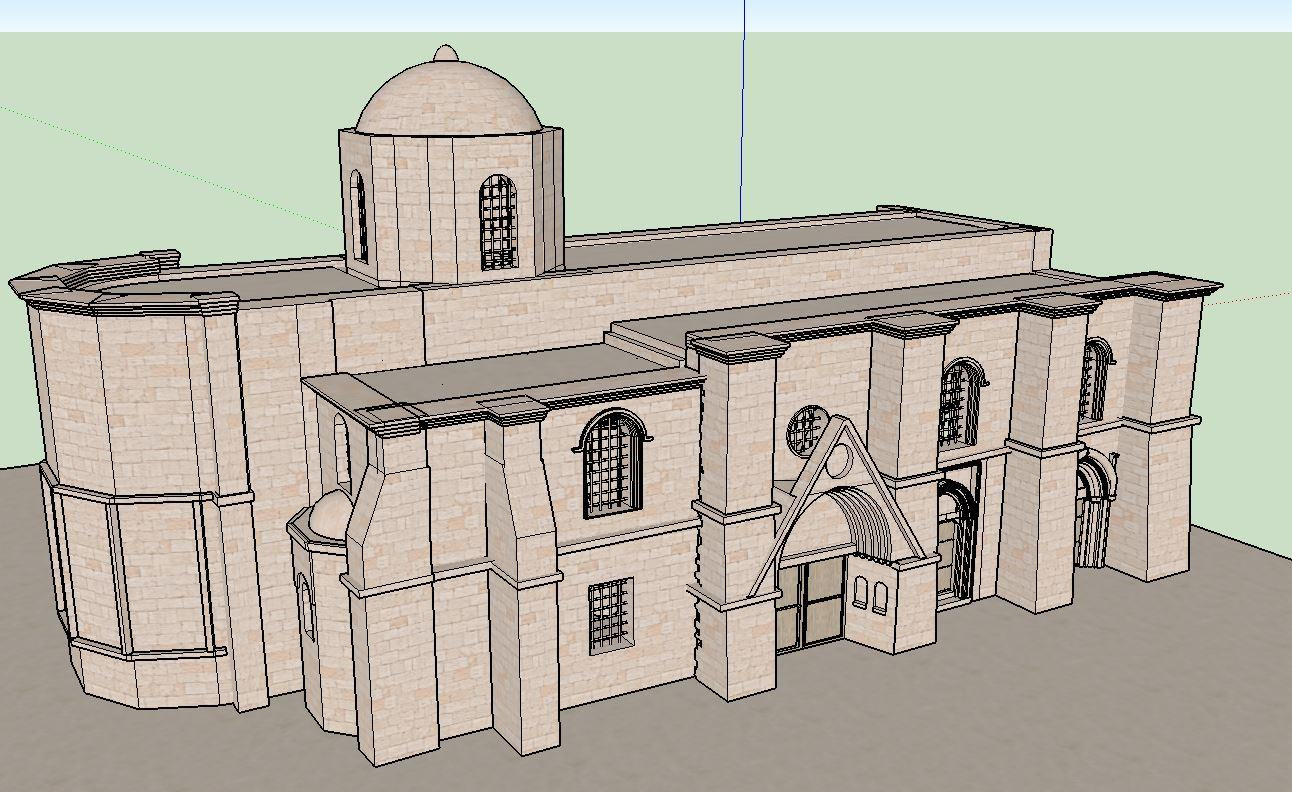
- Bedesten, Lefkoşa. Three dimensional model by Robert Barratt

- Nicosia

Religion
- District: Nicosia District
- Status: Active

Location
- Location: Nicosia
- Country: Cyprus (de jure); Northern Cyprus (de facto)
- Interactive map of Bedesten, Nicosia
- Coordinates: 35.1761°N 33.3641°E

Bedesten or Bedestan is a historical building in the Selimiye quarter of North Nicosia, North Cyprus, located directly beside the Selimiye Mosque. The structure has a long and complicated history spanning more than one thousand years. Originally built as a church in about the sixth century, and expanded and rebuilt between the twelfth and sixteenth centuries, dedicated to Saint Nicholas, it was converted to a bedesten, a type of covered market, during the period of Ottoman rule. It is currently used as a cultural centre.

== History ==
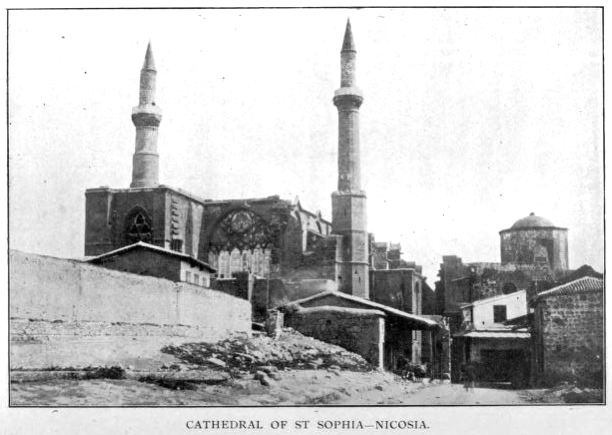
General view of the Bedesten with its dome, and the adjacent Selimiye Mosque, as the monuments stood in 1914.

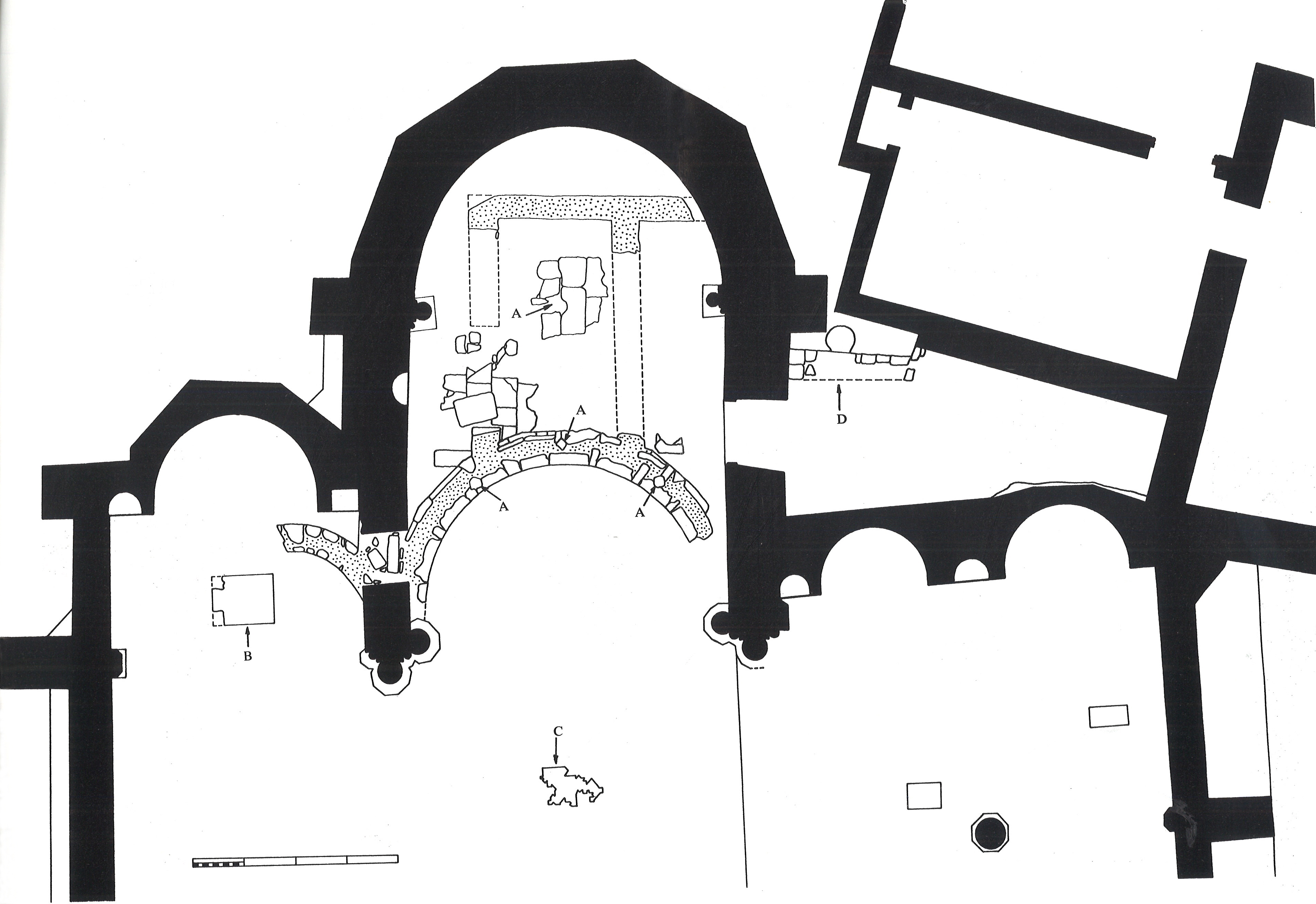
Bedesten, Nicosia. Plan of the east end showing early Byzantine apse. Key: A. holes cut in the Byzantine fabric for centring while the current structure was being built; B. base of late medieval altar; C. Cosmatesque fragments under the dome, probably 16th century; D. Ottoman period well-casing in brick.

=== Byzantine period ===
The earliest history of the Bedesten is documented archaeologically by a Byzantine basilica, fragments of which are preserved inside the current building. These remains, which share some structural features with Afendrika and Ayios Philon, possibly date to the sixth century. T. C. Papacostas has identified these remains as marking the site of the first cathedral of Saint Sophia in Nicosia.

=== Lusignan period ===
Under the Lusignan kings the subsequent history of the building is not well documented, but some historians, including Camille Enlart, proposed that after the fall of Acre in the late twelfth century, English monks who were followers of Thomas Becket established a new Latin church on this site and dedicated it to Saint Nicholas. This reading of the sources is not, however, universally accepted in view of the minor role played by the Knights of Saint Thomas in the history of the Latin east. With the adjacent cathedral dedicated to the Latin rite, the Bedesten probably continued to serve an Orthodox role. The church was expanded several times and rebuilt during the fourteenth and the fifteenth centuries, but the old Byzantine apse was retained.

=== Venetian period ===
During the Venetian rule of the island, the Bedesten was used as the metropolitan bishopric building by the Orthodox church, and dedicated to Mary as Panagia Hodegetria. It was under the Venetians that the most notable part of the building—the north facade—was constructed. The patrons were noble Cypriot families, their identity documented in part by the coats of arms carved immediately above the main entrance. It was in the same period that the dome and large central apse were constructed, replacing the original of the Byzantine period.

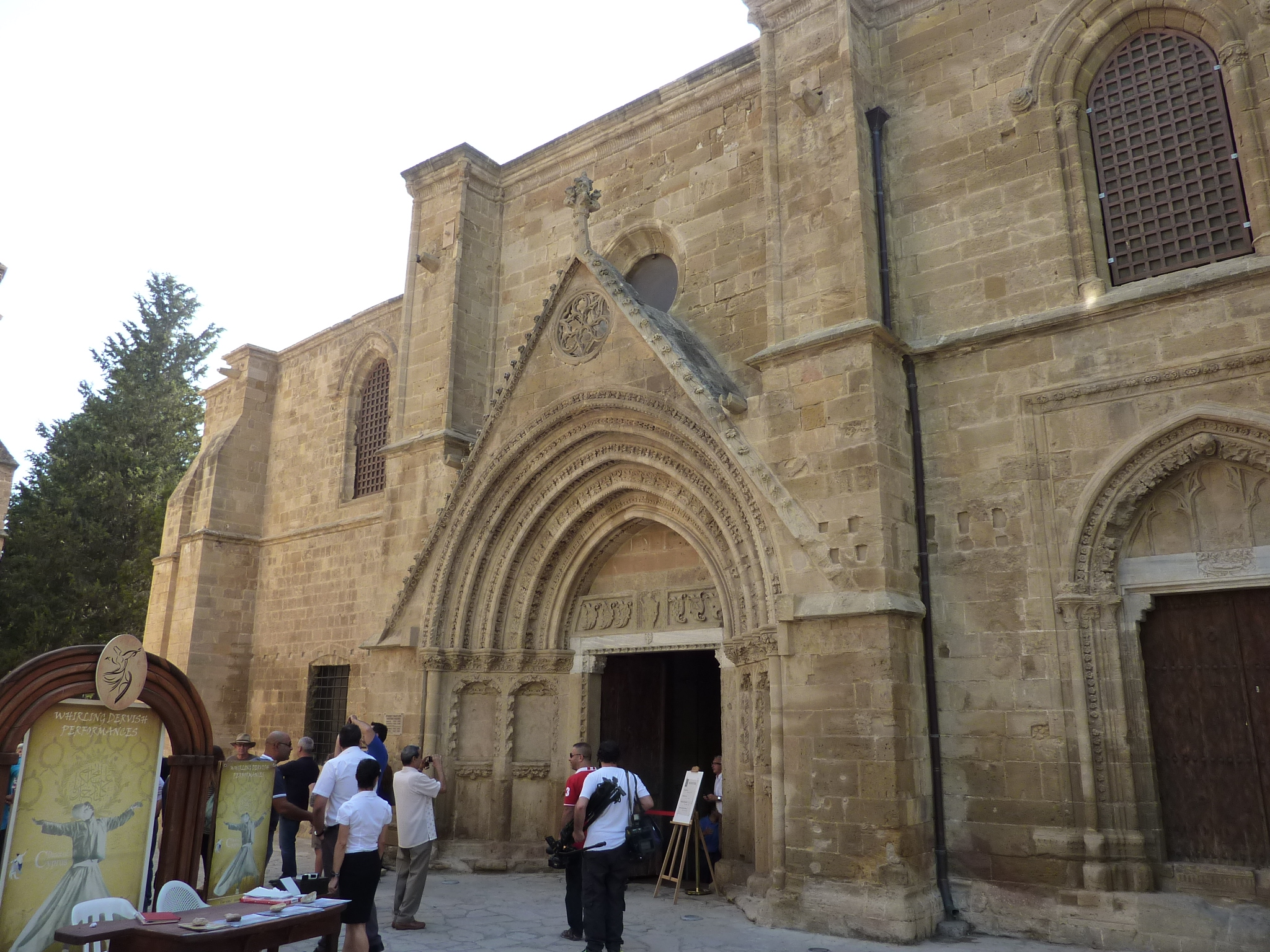
Bedesten, Lefkoşa. North facade and main door in 2014.

=== Ottoman period ===
In 1573, a few years after the Ottoman conquest of Cyprus, the building was given by the Ottoman authorities to the foundation of Haramayn (that of the two holy cities of Islam, Mecca and Medina) to be used as a bedesten (a covered textile market). It was later used as a market for food, and by the 1760s it was a food trading center for Turkish, Greek and Armenian merchants alike. By 1873, it had been converted into a flour depot with limited sale of flour, which was brought from Kythrea, by governmental officials. It was then used as a wheat depot in the 1870s and a generic storage place for the Evkaf Administration in the 1930s.

=== British period ===
In the 1880s, the first years of British colonial rule, Lord Kitchener and other prominent British men in Cyprus wanted to buy or rent the building to convert it back to a church and use it as the Church of St Nicholas once again. This was not allowed as the property of a foundation could not be sold and a shrine of another religion could not be opened within 100 yards of a mosque. The British undertook some renovation of the building, which had been damaged due to weather and earthquakes, but this was not successful in that it did not reflect some of the original architecture. With the opening of the new municipal market, Bandabulya, in 1932, the building fell into disuse. In the 1930s, the building was used for storage by the Evkaf Administration and in 1935, the Department of Antiquities under Rupert Gunnis brought some medieval tombstones to the building from the Ömerge Mosque. These tombstones were displayed for some time in a room along with the room's ornate Ottoman-era ceiling.

== Architecture ==
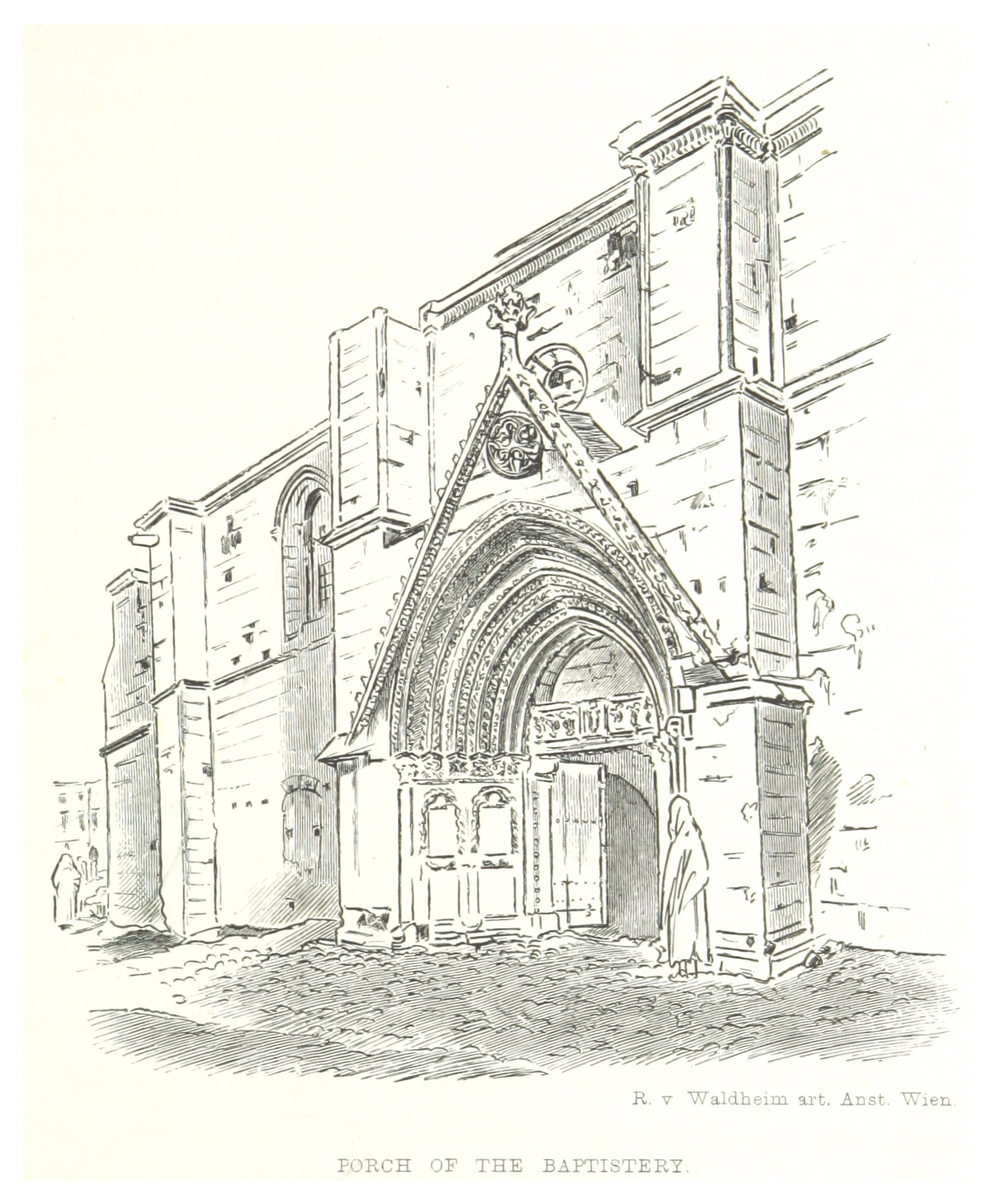
A drawing of the north side of the Bedesten in 1881, showing main door.

The Bedesten of Nicosia is stylistically very different from other bedestens in the Ottoman Empire. It consists mainly of a mix of Byzantine and Gothic architecture, the latter being added by the Lusignans, but also incorporates elements of Renaissance French, Venetian and probably Spanish architectural styles. It uses a cross-shaped structural style and layout that belongs to the Byzantine style, yet incorporates a nave with a high ceiling that belongs to the Gothic style. The southern double nave is a remnant of the Byzantine church and its middle section is the oldest part of the building. The exterior of the nave in the north has the most ornate decorations and stonework in the building. This façade is across the front arches of the Selimiye Mosque and is the side where the entrance is located. The entrance is through a very ornate Gothic-style gate, with elements of the Italian Renaissance architecture added later and a statuette of St Nicholas. Coats of arms are located on both sides of the entrance. This façade also has numerous animal statuettes and gargoyles.

== Renovation and current use ==
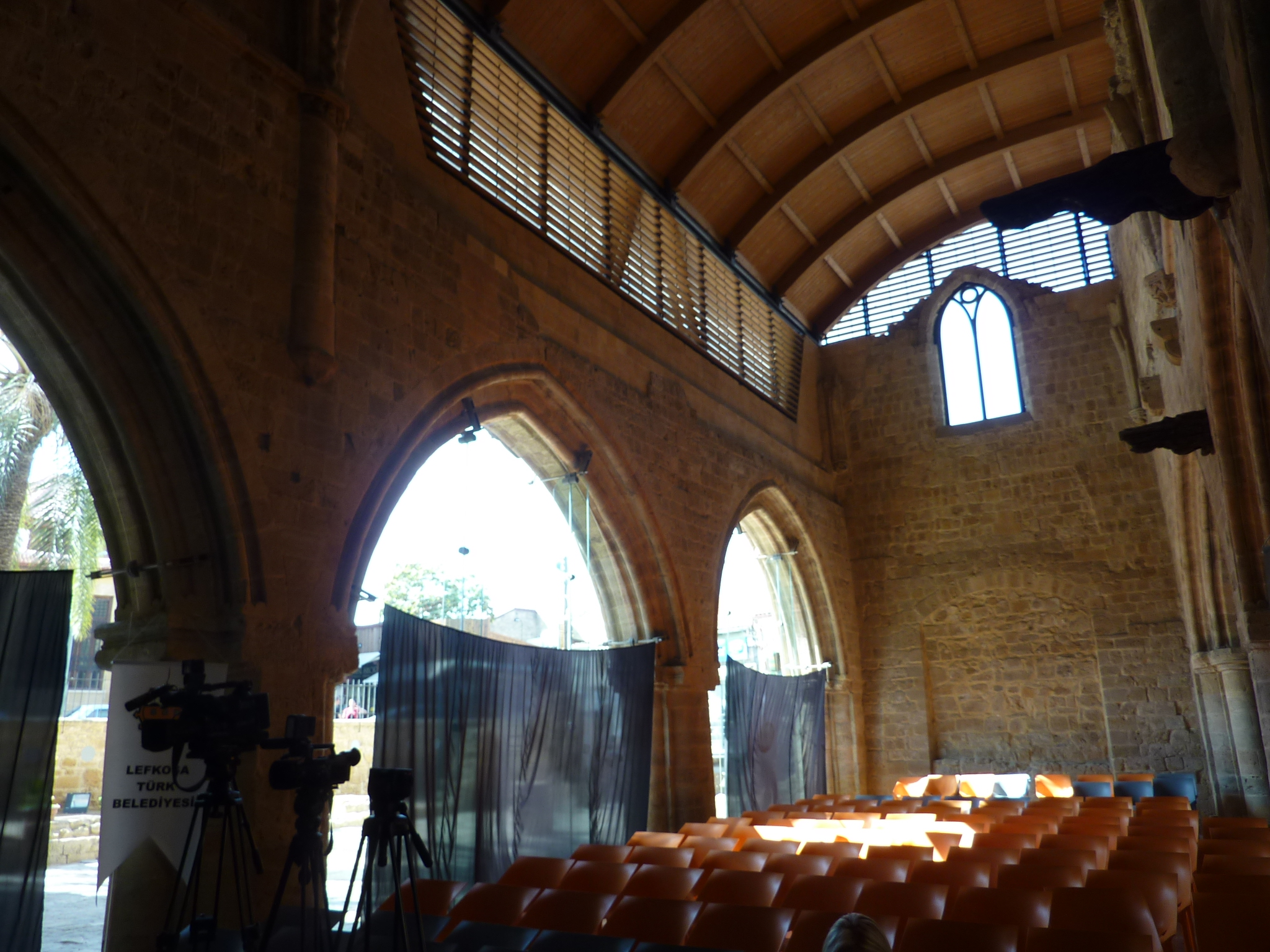
The interior of Bedesten, as restored, before a cultural event in 2014.

Between June 2004 and 2009, a project of renovation, funded by the European Union and the Evkaf Administration, was undertaken by the UNDP PFF. The restoration project was realized by the ITABC Institute of CNR. During the restoration, the walls of the building were cleansed and the vaults strengthened using traditional building materials and techniques. Upon the completion of restoration, the building was reopened as a cultural center. In 2009, the renovation was awarded the Europa Nostra Award. Among the activities hosted are weekly sufi dance shows. The building also hosts the Nicosia Walled City Jazz Festival.
