= Ayios Loukas, Nicosia =

Ayios Loukas
- Άγιος Λουκάς, Ayluka
- Location in Cyprus
- Coordinates: 35°10′48″N 33°21′55″E
- Country: Cyprus
- District: Nicosia District
- Municipality: Nicosia

Population (2011)
  - Total: 489
- Time zone: UTC+2 (EET)
  - Summer (DST): UTC+3 (EEST)

Ayios Loukas (St. Luke) is a Neighbourhood, Quarter, Mahalla or Parish of Nicosia, Cyprus and the parish church thereof. The church was dedicated to and named after St. Luke the Apostle and the parish or neighbourhood was named after the church. It is Άγιος Λουκάς in Greek and Ayluka or the new name Ayyıldız (Neighbourhood only) in Turkish.

At the last Census (2011) it had a population of 489.

The population in 1946 was 806, consisting of 263 Greek Cypriots, 536 Turkish Cypriots and 7 others.

Many Greek Cypriots formerly lived in this Neighbourhood around the church of Ayios Loukas, until the first inter-communal clashes in Nicosia in 1956. Each year, 18 October was the day of festivity in the name of St.Luke and the parishioners staged what was the most famous fair (Panayiri) within the walls of Nicosia. A four-day and four-night fair was organised annually in honour of St. Luke, during which local products and seasonal fresh fruits and dried fruits, almonds and walnuts were sold, together with shamishi and Loukoumades, etc. However, following the 1956 EOKA and later TMT activities, the Greek Cypriot inhabitants of the Ayios Loukas neighbourhood were terrorised into leaving and also the church was evacuated.

Mukhtari: Ayla Talik.

== History ==
Ayios Loukas is one of the 24 historic Neighbourhoods of Nicosia within the walls. During the Ottoman period it was accounted as one of the Greek Orthodox Quarters of Nicosia. However, all the adjacent Neighbourhoods, such as Yeni Jami and Ak Kavuk (Abu Kavuk), were overwhelmingly moslem in character. By 1946 the Greek Orthodox population had dropped to 33%.

The population of Ayios Loukas during British rule in Cyprus was as follows:

Date	Population	% Greek Cyp.
1891	283	85%
1901	331	86%
1911	369	88%
1921	527	61%
1931	619	58%
1946	806	33%

There was a minor change to the Neighbourhood boundaries in 1912.

The church was built in 1758, in dressed limestone, when Philotheos was Archbishop of Cyprus. This date appears in the list of Orthodox churches enumerated by Kyprianos in 1780.

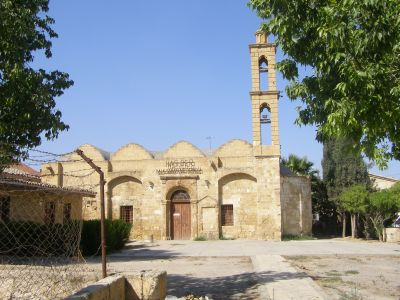
Church of Ayios Loukas (St. Luke)

== Church ==
The present building evidently occupies the site of a mediaeval church of which the north and west walls still exist. The north and west doorways are of mediaeval style. The plan of the building is a double nave divided by a row of circular columns supporting pointed arches and cross vaulting, the north aisle is somewhat narrower than the south. The windows are square headed with corbel supports to the lintel. On the south side of the church is an unfinished cloister of the 18th century.

Before 1956, the church interior had an iconostasis which was a florid wood carving painted brown and, in the gynaiketis (women's gallery), there were a large collection of disused icons with the former Rood of the church dated 1692. Amongst these icons was a curious processional picture painted on both sides measuring about 75 cm. x 50 cm. and mounted on a pole. On one side was the Panayia, on the other a representation of the Crucifixion.

The church remained in ruins after the parishioners were forced to leave the area, until it was restored in 1986 and it was allocated to the Turkish Cypriot Folklore Association (HASDER).

Ayios Loukas (St.Luke's) Quarter according to survey of Nicosia shortly after the start of British rule in 1878

The map shows the Neighbourhood or Quarter of Ayios Loukas, with the church centrally placed in its borders. Just outside the border to the west lies the mosque of Ak Kavuk or Abu Kavuk, in the adjacent Neighbourhood or Quarter of that name. To the north-east is the Loredano (Cevizli) Bastion, on the Venetian walls of Nicosia . Borders as at c. 1900.
