= İplik Pazarı Mosque =

Mosque in North Nicosia, Northern Cyprus

- İplik Pazarı Camii
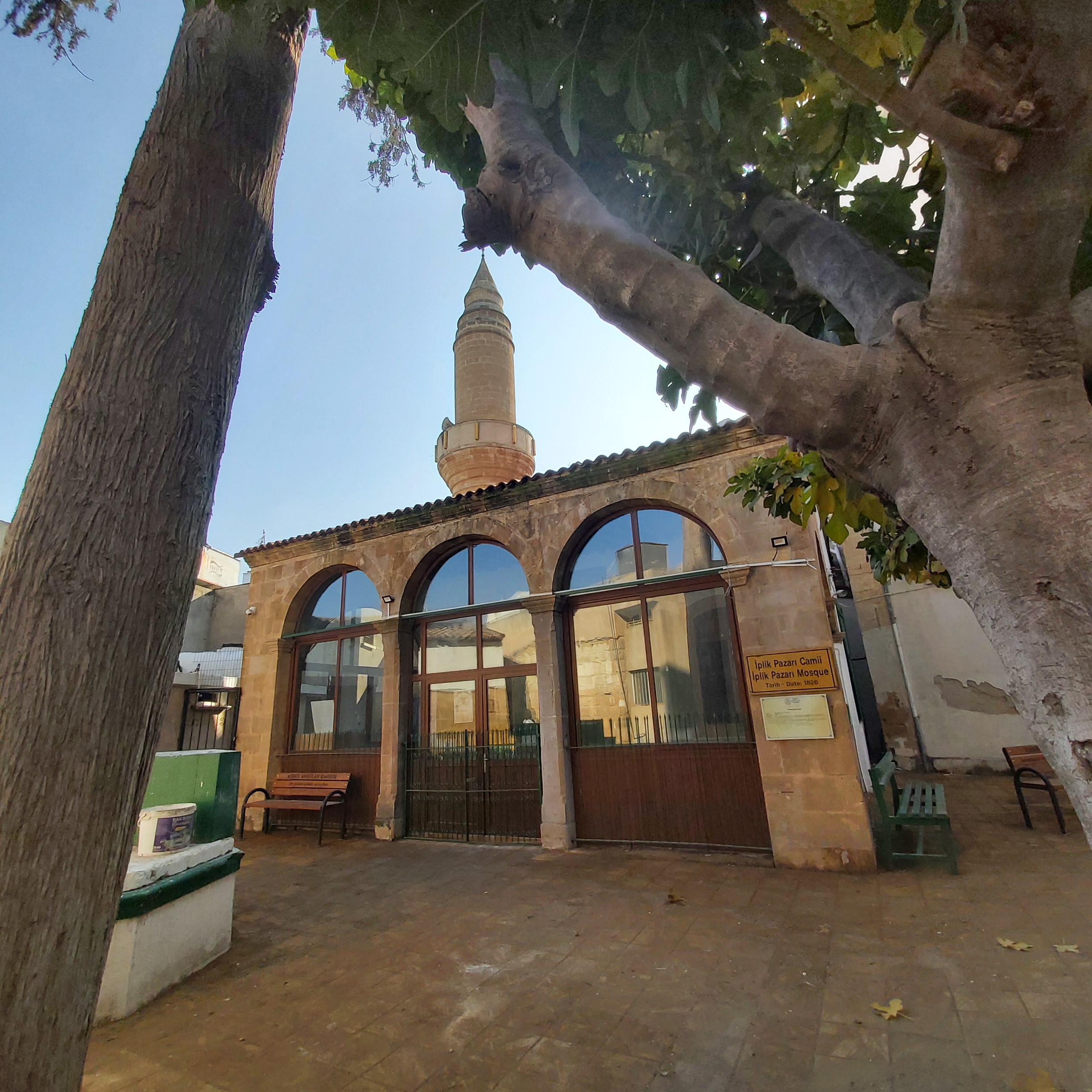

- Location within Cyprus

Religion
- Affiliation: Sunni Islam
- Ownership: Evkaf Administration
- Status: Active

Location
- Location: Iplik Bazar–Korkut Effendi, Nicosia, Cyprus
- Municipality: Nicosia Turkish Municipality
- Interactive map of İplik Pazarı Mosque
- Coordinates: 35.17714°N 33.36189°E

Architecture
- Funded by: Hacı Ahmed Ağa; Muhammed Sadık Bey
- Completed: 1826 (initial mosque, current minaret); 1899 (current mosque)

Specifications
- Direction of façade: Northwest
- Minaret: One

İplik Pazarı Mosque (Turkish: İplik Pazarı Camii) is a mosque in the Iplik Bazar–Korkut Effendi quarter in the walled city of Nicosia, currently located in North Nicosia. It is located on İplik Pazarı Street. Its minaret is one of the very few in Cyprus to have a stone cap.

== Location ==
The mosque used to be surrounded by a bazaar of thread makers (İplik Pazarı), from which the current name derives.

== History ==
The building dates to the 19th century. Its initial construction was sponsored by Hacı Ahmed Ağa, a governor of Cyprus in the early 19th century and the last governor of Cyprus to hold the pre-Tanzimat title of muhassıl. An inscription in the mosque dated to 1826 details the sponsorship by the governor of Cyprus. In its earlier days, the mosque was also known by the name "Muhassıl Hacı Ahmed Ağa Mosque". This building was replaced with the current mosque under the sponsorship of Muhammed Sadık Bey, a charitable foundation board member (vakıf murahhas üyesi) in 1898 in the British period. This work was undertaken to expand the mosque's capacity.

== Architecture ==
It is generally described as having a relatively simple architecture of utilitarian character. It has a rectangular plan extending on a northwest-southeast axis. The narthex (son cemaat yeri), situated in the northwestern side has three arches to the front and one arch to each side. It was built of regular cut stone. However, the rest of the mosque was not built using the same material, but was built using irregularly cut stone and rubble fillings instead.

There are two inscriptions on the arched entrance from the narthex into the prayer area (harim). One of these is dated to the construction of the mosque in 1826. The other, dated to 1899, was inscribed by the Cypriot calligrapher Kutubul El Hac Mehmet Arif in the talik script. It details the reconstruction of the mosque and various other benefactions by Muhammed Sadık Bey.

In the southeastern wall of the men's prayer area lies a simple mihrab and a wooden minbar with exquisite floral woodwork. A wooden staircase in the northeast leads to the wooden women's prayer area.

The minaret, whose gate opens into the mosque, is special in terms of Cypriot religious architecture in that it is one of the very few minarets to have a stone cap. It belongs to the initial mosque constructed by Hacı Ahmed Ağa in the early 19th century and predates the rest of the building.

In the yard of the mosque is a hexagonal water fountain built in the British period. As the ground level of the yard has risen over the 20th century, the taps of the fountain have been left under the surface.

The discovery of two tombstones in a shop next to the mosque has indicated that a small cemetery had existed next to it.
