= Mevlevi Tekke Museum =

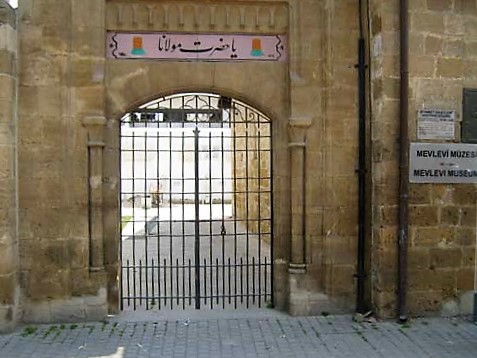
Entrance of the museum on Girne Avenue

Mevlevi Tekke Museum is a tekke in Nicosia, Cyprus, currently in North Nicosia. It has historically been used by the Mevlevi Order and now serves as a museum. It is one of the most important historical and religious buildings on the island. It is located next to the Kyrenia Gate, on Girne Avenue, in the İbrahimpaşa quarter.

== History ==
=== Functioning as a tekke ===
It is traditionally held that the building was built in the early 17th century, on a piece of land donated by a landlady called Emine Hatun. This Emine Hatun hailed from the village of Kyra, where she owned a farm. It is rumoured by the locals that she is buried in a grave without any inscriptions, located to the northeast of the tomb in the tekke. According to another view, the tekke is located on land donated by Arab Ahmed Pasha and Haydar Paşazade Fatma Hanım. According to the Evkaf Administration, the tekke was initially built in 1593 by Arab Ahmed Pasha on a plot of land owned by him and then enlarged into a complex using land donated by Emine Hatun.

According to documents from Ottoman archives from 1593, a mevlevi tekke named after Arab Ahmed Pasha, built on a plot of land donated by him, was built near Kyrenia Gate. This tekke was ruined by 1607 and Ferhad Pasha built a mevlevi tekke on its foundations and named it after him in 1607. The present-day tekke is a continuation of this one. A document from 1857 mentions the addition of an administrative building to the tekke, which oversaw the needs of the poor at the time. The sheikh of the tekke was under the jurisdiction of the central administration in Konya, while Kutup Osman Tekke in Famagusta, Mehmet Bey Ebubekir Tekke and Mehmet Buba Tekke in Paphos and Piri Osman Tekke in Limassol were amongst the ones responding to Nicosia. As of 1873, there were 36 members of the tekke and rituals were conducted on Sundays.

When tekkes in Turkey were closed as a part of Atatürk's Reforms in 1925, some in the Turkish Cypriot community demanded the closure of the tekke. However, the British disregarded this, and as the centre of the Mevlevi Order had moved from Konya to Aleppo, it decided to appoint Syrian sheikhs. The first such sheikh was Muhammed Selim Dede from Damascus, appointed on 6 December 1933 and paid £48 by the colonial government, in the place of Mehmed Celâleddin Efendi, who had died in 1931. Selim Dede would hold this position until his death on 9 December 1953 and was replaced by Hafız Şefik Efendi. However, as those who were appointed after Selim Dede were either workers or civil servants who could not serve as sheikh continually, the tekke ceased operation in 1954, with the Mevlevi Order in Cyprus officially ceasing to exist on 15 April 1956, with the handover of Evkaf Administration to the Turkish Cypriot community.

=== List of sheikhs ===
The following incomplete list of sheikhs of the tekke was compiled by archaeologist Tuncer Bağışkan, according to the mentions in Ottoman archives:

- Saadeddin İbn Muharrem (1607)
- Siyahi Mustafa Dede (?–1710)
- El-Haç Mehmet Sadri Dede (1719–?)
- Hızır Dede (Handi Dede) Efendi (?–1727)
- Mehmet Arif Dede (1727–1765)
- Seyid Abdullah Dede (1765)
- Mustafa Dede (1765–1766)
- Feyzullah Dede (1813–1850/51)
- Mustafa Safvet Efendi (1850/51–1857)
- Konyalı Şeyh Derviş Ali Dede (29 April 1857–9 December 1860)
- Mustafa Safvet Efendi (9 December 1860–1894)
- Şeyh Mehmet Celâleddin Efendi (20 September 1893–22 September 1931)
- Şamlı Selim Dede (6 December 1933–9 December 1953)
- Hafız Şefik Efendi

== Architecture ==
The building is an important example of Ottoman architecture in the urban fabric of Nicosia. The current surviving buildings are the semahane, used for the whirling rituals of sama, the tomb, and a few rooms to the east of the semahane, along with a small backyard. The initial tekke contained rooms for dervishes, guestrooms, a kitchen, a well dated to the Venetian times and a large garden with fruit trees, but these buildings were ruinous by the 1950s and demolished to make room for Vakıflar Pasajı, a business centre. The garden was also mostly taken up by this new building.
