= Iplik Bazar–Korkut Effendi =

Iplik Bazar–Korkut Effendi Ιπλίκ Παζάρ-Κορκούτ Εφέντι (Greek) İplik Pazarı-Korkut Efendi (Turkish)
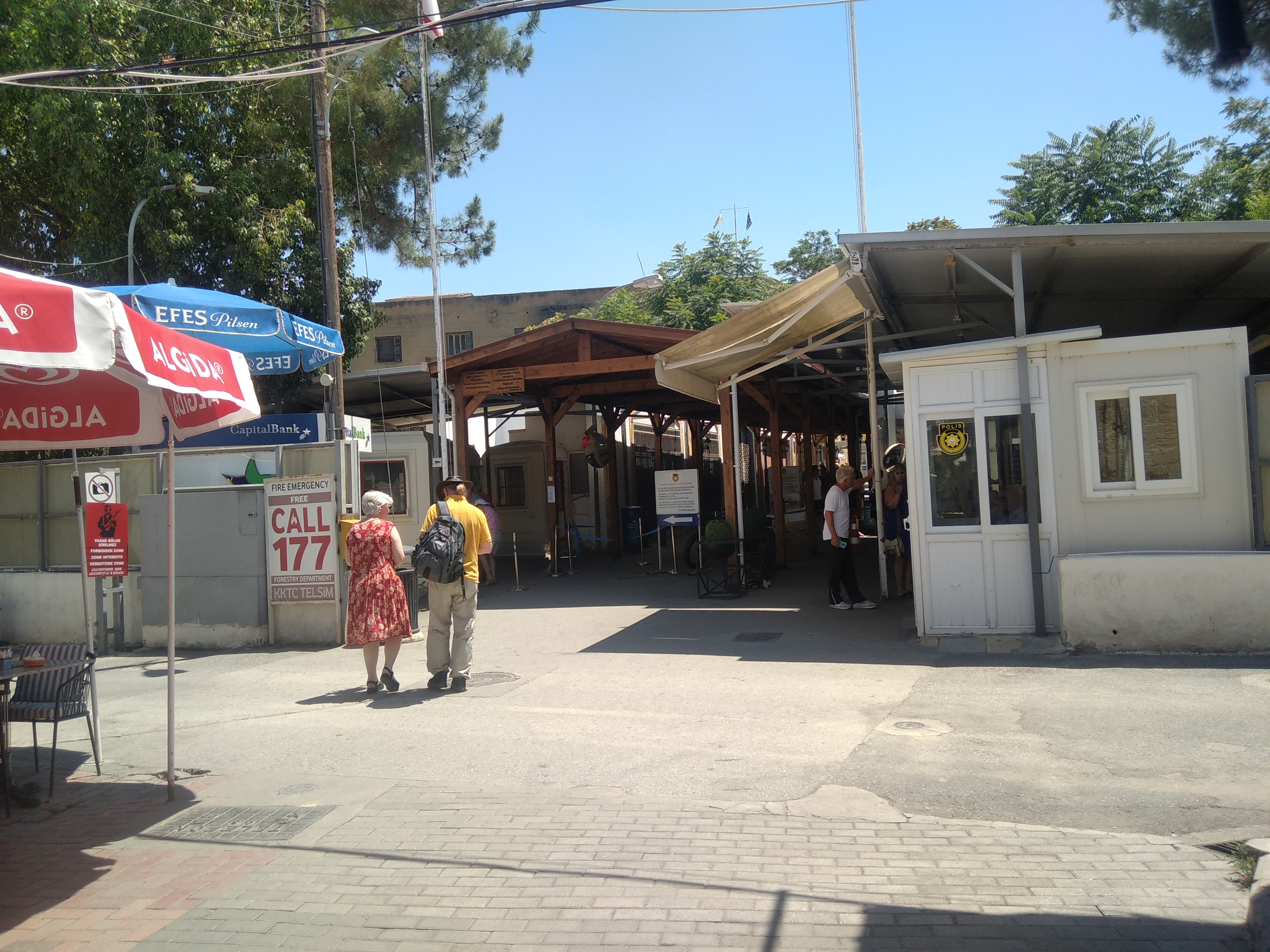
- Ledra Street crossing point at the Green Line

- Location in Cyprus
- Coordinates: 35°10′34″N 33°21′40″E
- Country: Cyprus
- District: Nicosia District
- Municipality: Nicosia

Government
  - Mukhtar: Mehmet Alisinemoğlu

Population (2011)
  - Total: 229

Iplik Bazar–Korkut Effendi (Greek: Ιπλίκ Παζάρ-Κορκούτ Εφέντι; Turkish: İplik Pazarı-Korkut Efendi) is a Neighbourhood, Quarter, Mahalla or Parish of Nicosia, Cyprus. It lies in the centre of the walled city.

== Location ==
Iplik Bazar–Korkut Effendi is bordered on the north by the quarters of Ibrahim Pasha and Abdi Chavush, to the east by Ayia Sophia, to the south by Phaneromeni and Nebethane, and to the west by Karamanzade and Arab Ahmet.

== Population ==
At the last Census (2011) it had a population of 229. The population in 1946 was 556, consisting of 116 Greek Cypriots, 232 Turkish Cypriots and 208 others.

== History ==
Iplik Pazar and Korkut Effendi are two of the 24 historic Neighbourhoods of Nicosia within the walls.

Neither quarter appeared in the first Ottoman Census of 1572, which listed 7 quarters. Nor do they appear among the 12 quarters that existed a century later In the Ottoman census of 1831 they are listed among the 24 quarters, as two of the 15 Moslem quarters of the city. By 1912 the two quarters had been merged into one, within about the same boundaries that have been published in the latest survey

In the south of the quarter, the Ledra Street crossing point through the UN buffer zone was reopened in 2008, after 34 years.

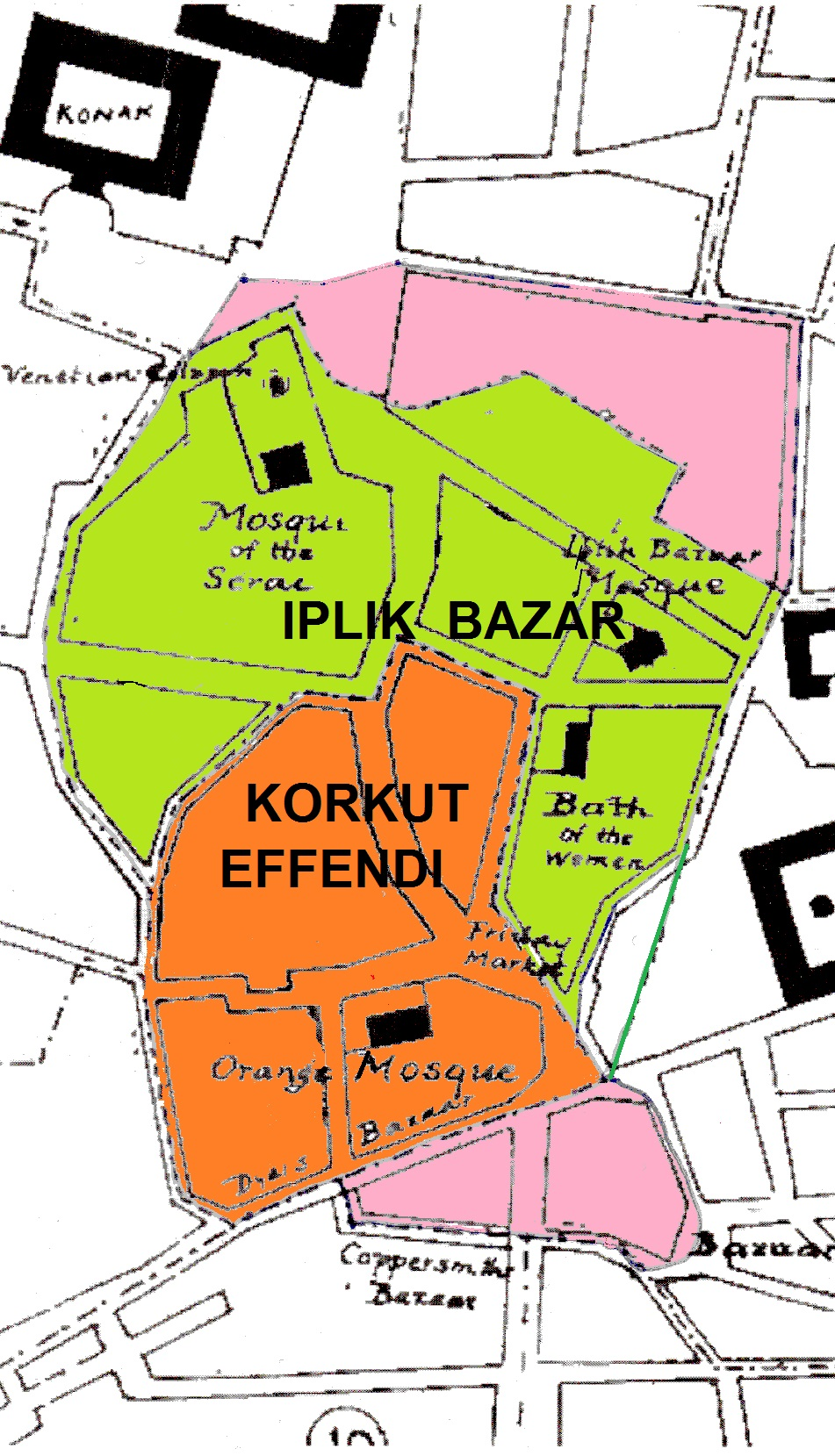
Green: Iplik Bazar, Orange: Korkut Effendi (according to survey c. 1878). Pink: other areas in the present combined quarter

== Korkut Effendi Quarter - landmarks ==
In this division the numerous traces of houses of a superior description such as the much mutilated doors and windows of lower floors and courses of regular masonry, seem to suggest the existence of a Latin parish.

=== Turunjlu Jami ===
The mosque of the district is known as the Turunjlu (Turunçlu) Jami or mosque of the "orange tree." It appears to be a building of 18th-century style, in the general form of a church with a narthex or porch at the west end. In all probability it is built on the foundations of a mediaeval Latin church, but neither date nor inscription remains to afford any information on the subject.

== Iplik Pazar Quarter - landmarks ==
Iplik Pazar means cotton or linen market. This quarter probably represents a Latin parish of which the church has been appropriated as a mosque.

=== Iplik Pazar Mosque ===
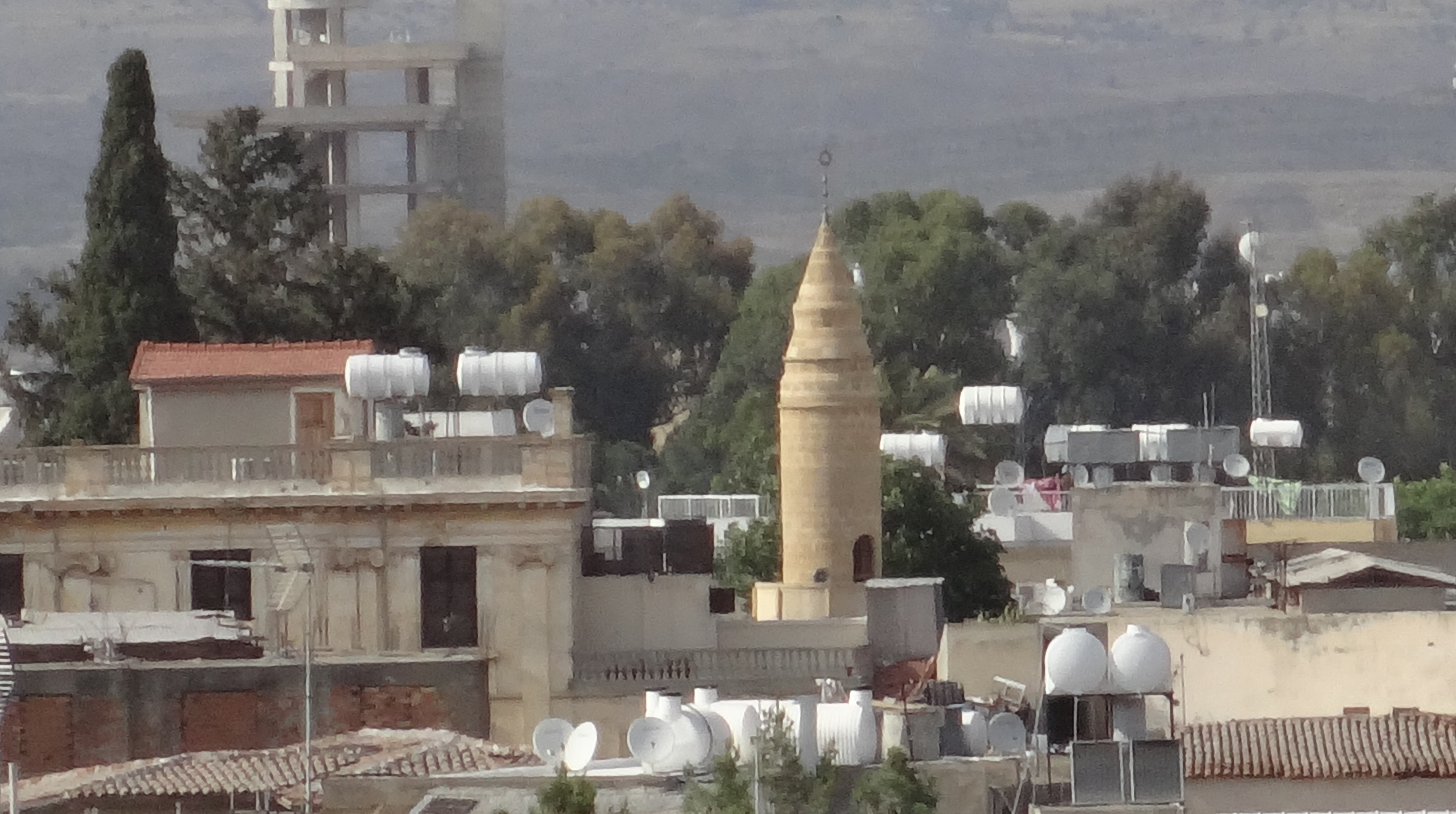
The minaret of Iplik Pazar mosque, with its distinctive stone top, rising above the Iplik Pazar Quarter

This is a small 19th century building of the usual simple utilitarian character, which was restored in 1826 and 1899. Attached to it is a singularly short minaret the gallery of which is not higher than the first floor of surrounding buildings. The minaret is older than the main building and is probably the only minaret in Cyprus with a stone conical cap.

An older building may have existed on the site, of which the minaret remains, half buried in the mound of earth and debris which has accumulated in this neighbourhood from the decay and ruin of old houses.

=== Mosque of the Serai ===
The present Mosque of the Serai is a small building erected in 1903, occupying the site of an older mosque built between 1820 and 1824. It may have been constructed out of the remains of a church. A few gravestones which existed in this former building point to this fact. On one of these gravestones was a fairly complete inscription. The other fragments were too much broken to be decipherable. They have all since been destroyed.

=== Venetian Column ===
In the north-west corner of the quarter lies the Atatürk Square, commonly known as "Sarayönü", square of the former Serai or palace, in the centre of which stands the symbol of Venetian Dominion still preserved : the column which was always set up in the principal piazza of a Venetian town. The column in Nicosia is a particularly interesting example of such a monument on account of the inscription and coats of arms on its base. The shaft of grey granite which measures about 6 metres in height and about 70 cm in diameter is evidently the relic of some important Roman temple. Six coats of arms carved in marble in an early renaissance style originally decorated the six faces of the pedestal.

The column was intended to be crowned with a Lion of St. Mark which has disappeared.

Until the late 19th century a pole stood close by which probably occupied the same place as the original Venetian flagstaff. This pole was decorated with Turkish flags on festival occasions, much in the same way as in the days when the lion banner of St. Mark floated from it, and proclaimed the sovereignty of the "Serene Republic" in this principal piazza of the capital.

The Nicosia column was erected in about the year 1550. It was restored on a new site in the summer of 1915, at a few yards distance from its original emplacement.

=== Büyük Hamam ===
The Büyük Hamam (large bathhouse) stands nearby Iplik Pazar mosque. Although some have suggested that this building is the 14th century church of St. George the Latins, no evidence is forthcoming for such an identification, and this theory overlooks the fact that although the building much resembles a mediaeval church in appearance it does not conform to the invariable planning of such buildings. Instead of lying east and west it is built north and south in a manner which would have been almost impossible until perhaps the period of the Venetian Occupation.

The interior is a vaulted hall of three bays. This doorway constructed of mutilated fragments from another building which have been pieced together in a clumsy manner, is remarkable as having been originally an exact replica of the west portal of the church of Akhiropietos Monastery in Kyrenia District).

In consequence of the decay of surrounding buildings this Bath House is buried to a depth of about one metre and a half below the present level of the neighbouring roads and lanes.
