= Ayia Sophia quarter, Nicosia =

Neighbourhood of Nicosia, Cyprus

Ayia Sophia
- Agia Sophia, Ayasofya, Ἁγία Σοφία, Selimiye
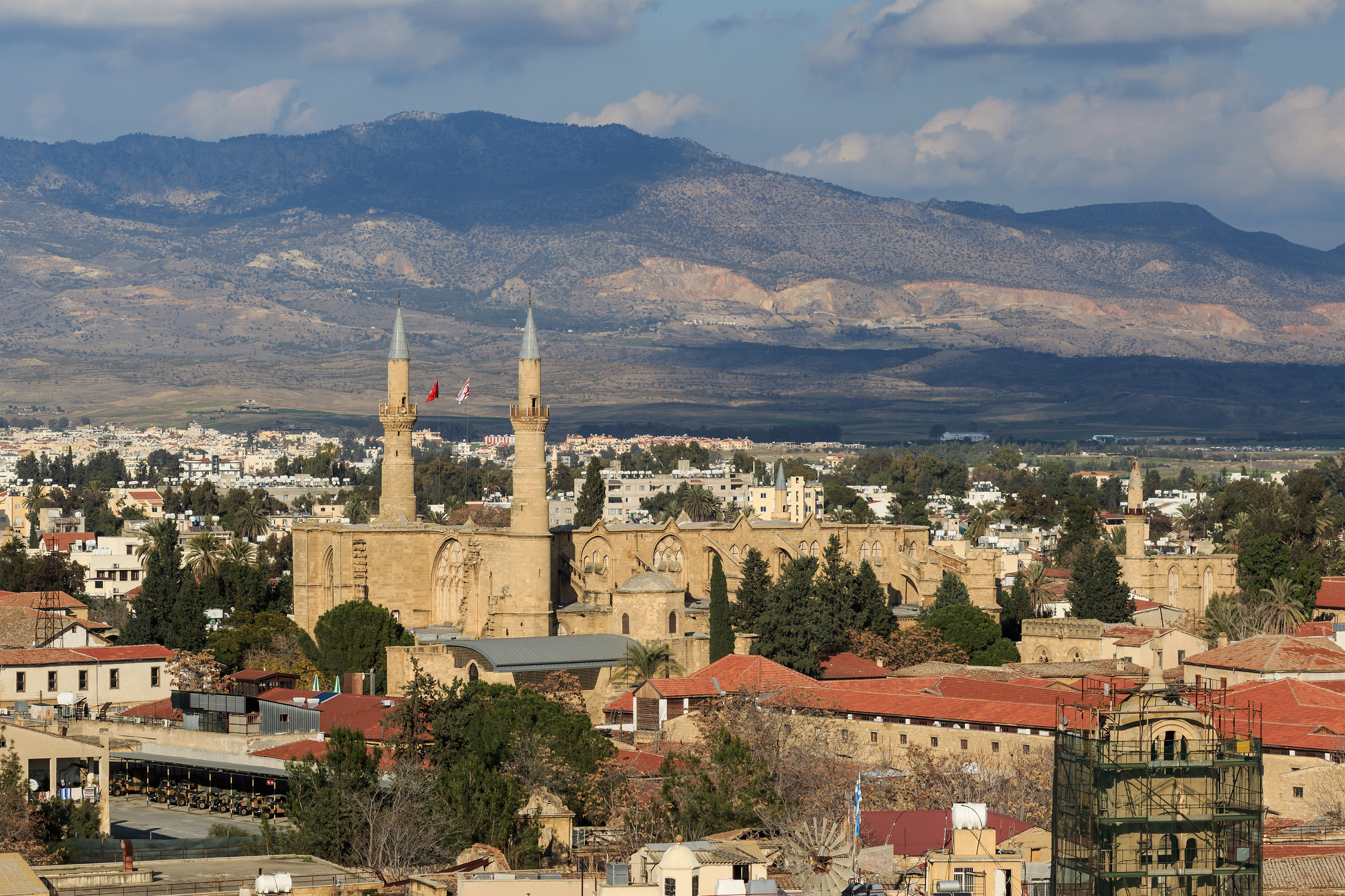
- Ayia Sophia quarter, looking north. Selimiye (Ayia Sophia) mosque in centre. Minaret of Yeni Jami (grey top) behind. Haydar Pasha mosque on right. Bedestan in foreground

- Location in Cyprus
- Coordinates: 35°10′39″N 33°21′58″E
- Country: Cyprus
- District: Nicosia District
- Municipality: Nicosia

Area
  - Total: 35 acres (14 ha)

Population (2011)
  - Total: 878
- Time zone: UTC+2 (EET)
  - Summer (DST): UTC+3 (EEST)

Ayia Sophia (Turkish: Ayasofya; Ottoman Turkish: آیا صوفیا; Greek: Ἁγία Σοφία, romanized: Ayía Sophía; is a Neighbourhood, Quarter or Mahalle of Nicosia, Cyprus and the former name of the mosque situated therein. On 13 August 1954 the name of the mosque was changed to Selimiye, after the conqueror of Cyprus, Sultan Selim II, a decision taken by the mufti, Mehmet Dana Efendi. The name of the quarter and the surrounding street names were not changed by the secular authorities, at least initially. Ayia Sophia (various spellings) is still used by the Department of Lands and Surveys, and by the Census.

== Location ==
Ayia Sophia Quarter is located at the exact centre of Nicosia within the walls. A copper plaque in Kuyumcular Sokak (Goldsmiths Street), near Selimiye mosque, indicates that location as exactly 1/2 mile (0.80 kilometres) to each of the 11 bastions around Nicosia's walls . Determined by G. Hykle in 1987.

The quarter straddles the Green Line in Nicosia, thus the Cyprus Statistical Service indicates that the quarter is "partially occupied", the non-occupied part being a strip alongside Hermes Street and the south-east corner.

Ayia Sophia quarter is bordered on the north by the quarter of Abdi Chavush, to the northeast by Yeni Jami, to the east by Haydar Pasha, to the southeast by Agios Kassianos (Kafesli) and Chrysaliniotissa, to the south by Taht-el-kale, Omeriye and Phaneromeni, and to the west by Iplik Bazar–Korkut Effendi.

== Population ==
Population according to the Census taken in each year, where Ayia Sophia is separately reported.

Date	Greek Cyp.	Turkish Cyp.	Turkish Cyp. %	Total
1831(male)	0	396	100%	396
1881(male)				408
1881				767
1891	74	745	91.0%	819
1901	221	841	79.2%	1062
1911	206	919	81.7%	1125
1921	291	1054	78.4%	1345
1931	524	1085	67.4%	1609
1946	632	1239	64.0%	1936
2011				878

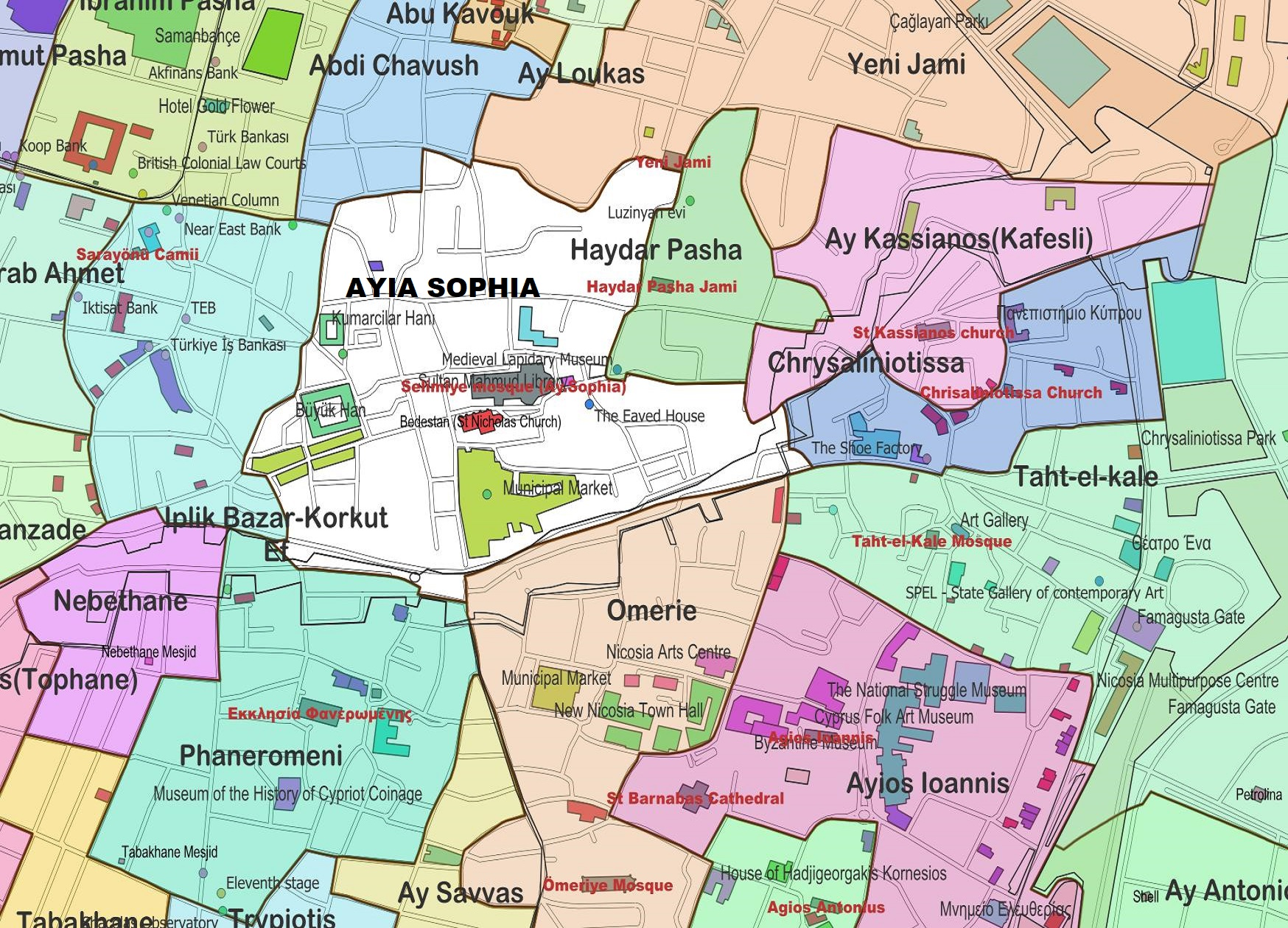
Ayia Sophia and adjacent quarters

Note: 1832 census only included males. The figure for males in 1881 is included for comparison. Census data indicates that the population level was stable at that time.

1960 census report does not included figures for each Quarter.

The 2021 Census reports a zero residential population for the south-east corner.

Hermes street as it enters the UN buffer zone. Ayia Sophia quarter on right side of street

== History ==
Ayia Sophia is one of the 24 historic quarters within the walls of Nicosia. During the Ottoman period it was counted as one of the Moslem quarters of Nicosia. The 1831 census reported the population was 100% Moslem. Ottoman census data indicates that the highest ranking Ottoman administrative officials for Cyprus resided in Ayia Sophia quarter during the 19th century. Later, the Moslem or Turkish Cypriot character of the neighbourhood waned and by 1946, Ayia Sophia had a population of 632 Greek Cypriots, 1239 Turkish Cypriots, and 65 others, still 64% Turkish Cypriot.

Until 1567 the River Pediaios flowed through the centre of Nicosia along the present locations of Lipertis and Hermes Streets, which form the southern boundary of Ayia Sophia quarter. In that year the Venetians diverted it outside the city, around the moat of the new walls they started constructing that year. The old river bed was later used for refuse disposal, so that it and the adjacent area became a health hazard. For this reason, the British enclosed the river bed in 1882 and a new street was built along the top, named Hermes Street. This along with Ledra Street became the foremost shopping and commercial street in the city. Hermes Street had a cosmopolitan character, drawing together the various communities in the city. But, starting in the 1950s it fell victim to the inter-communal conflicts and in December 1963 the Green Line was drawn along Hermes Street.

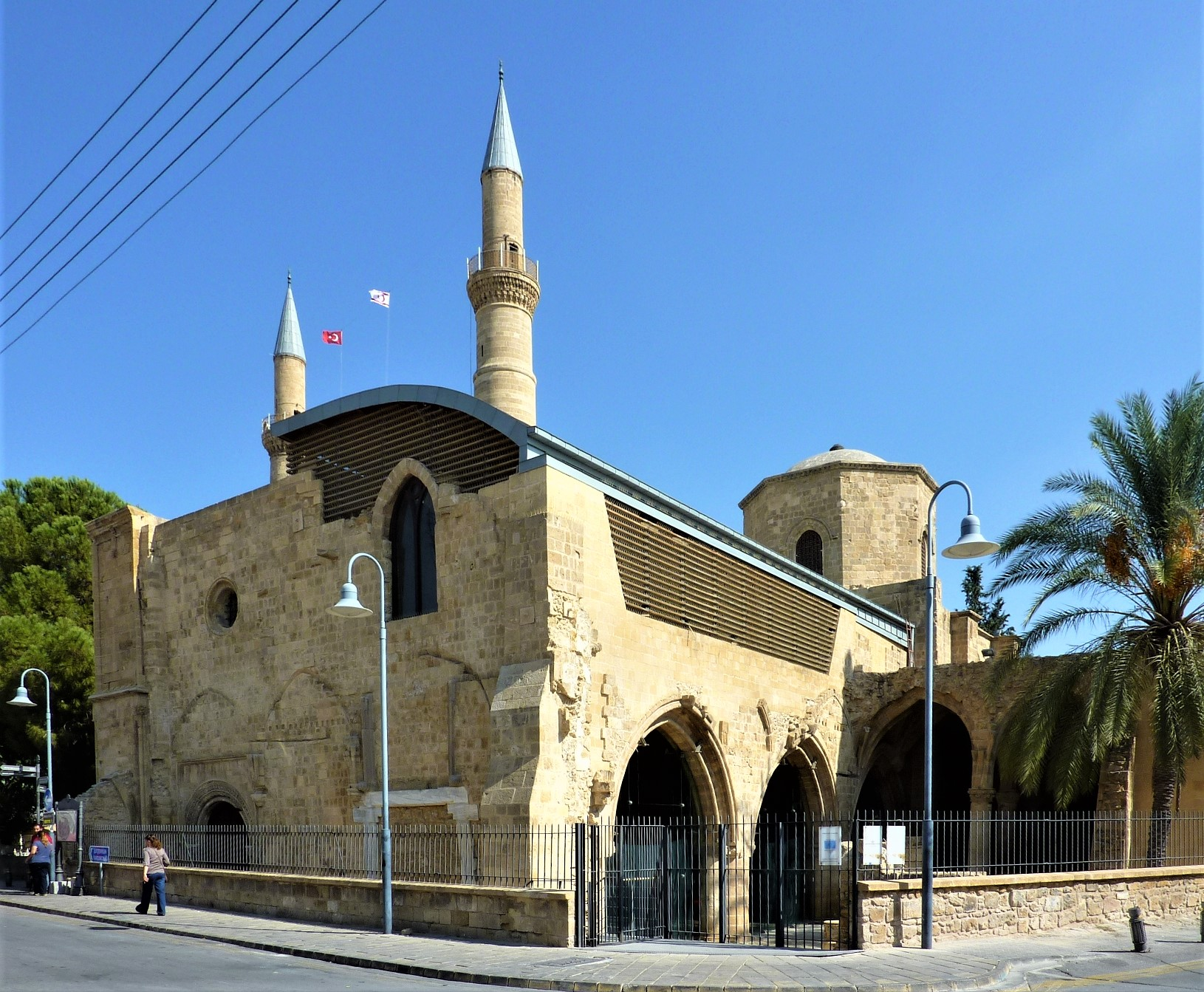
Bedestan

== Landmarks ==
In the centre of the quarter, the Selimiye Mosque, Nicosia is the largest surviving building from antiquity in Cyprus and the most important survival from the Lusignan Kingdom of Cyprus. Just to the south of the great mosque stands the Bedestan, which means in Turkish an exchange or market, the use to which it was put in the Ottoman period. During Venetian rule it was the Orthodox metropolis.

To the west is Büyük Han, meaning Great Inn in Turkish, which was the largest inn in Cyprus during Ottoman rule.

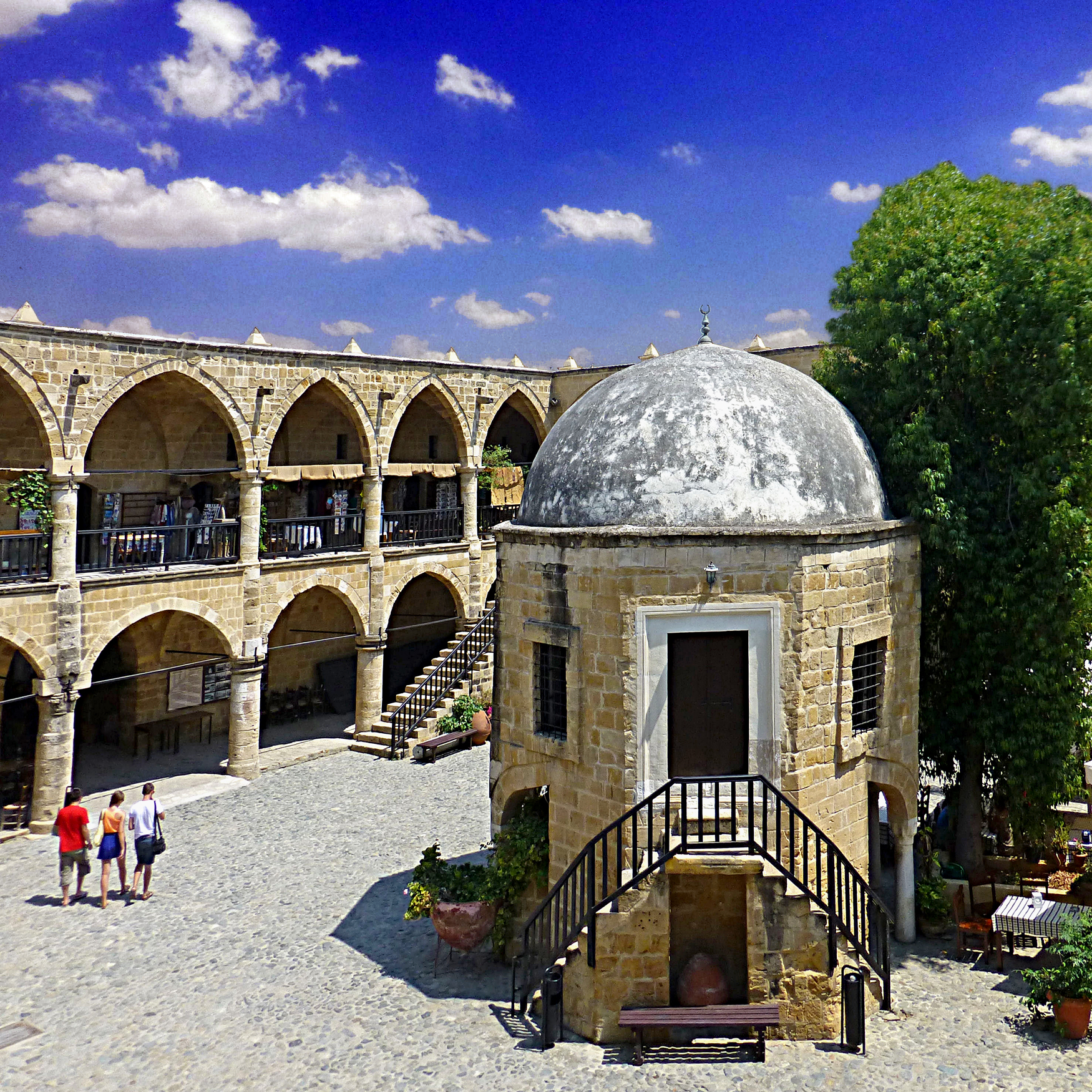
Büyük Han

To the south is Hermes Street, formerly one of the main shopping streets but now in the U.N. buffer zone, except for the south-east corner of the quarter. The southern boundary of the quarter runs along the centre of Hermes Street, except towards the west where it moves southward into Lipertis Street and Kykkos Avenue.
