= Ak Kavuk, Nicosia =

Ak Kavuk (Abu Kavuk)
- Άμπου Καβούκ, Akkavuk
- Location in Cyprus
- Coordinates: 35°10′52″N 33°21′50″E
- Country: Cyprus
- District: Nicosia District
- Municipality: Nicosia

Population (2011)
  - Total: 793
- Time zone: UTC+2 (EET)
  - Summer (DST): UTC+3 (EEST)

Ak Kavuk (Abu Kavuk) is a Neighbourhood, Quarter, Mahalla or Parish of Nicosia, Cyprus and the mosque thereof. It is spelled as Akkavuk in Turkish and Ακ Καβούκ or Άμπου Καβούκ in Greek. Both alternative names appear in English. Jeffery uses both, while the Cyprus Gazette in 1923 uses the form "Abou Kavouk".

At the last Census (2011) it had a population of 793.

The population in 1946 was 1202, consisting of 107 Greek Cypriots, 1094 Turkish Cypriots and 1 other.

== History ==
Ak Kavuk is one of the 24 historic Neighbourhoods of Nicosia within the walls. After the Ottoman conquest of Nicosia, it was divided into 12 quarters said to be derived from the 12 generals in command of divisions of the Ottoman army at the time. Each general being posted to a quarter, that quarter was known by his name. In this case the Quarter was named after General Ak Kavuk Pasha. (This is a nickname meaning "white cap.").

== Mosque ==
The map shows the Neighbourhood or Quarter of Ak Kavuk, with the mosque of Ak Kavuk or Abu Kavuk in the south-east corner of the Quarter. In the north is the Barbaro (Musalla) Bastion, on the Venetian walls of Nicosia . Borders as at c. 1900.

On the site of what appeared to be a small mediaeval chapel or church, a mosque was built in 1902. A smaller mosque on the site was built in 1895. The apse of the original building with a moulded arched window of 16th century style survived, but all such traces have now been removed.

On the southern wall at opposite of the doorway, there is a mihrab with an addition of a nearby wooden mimbar.

== Other sites ==
On the Barbaro/Musalla bastion is a Turkish military encampment, within which there is a Museum of National Struggle
