= Demetrios Spandidos =

Greek virologist and cancer researcher (born 1947)

Demetrios A. Spandidos
- Δημήτριος Σπαντίδος
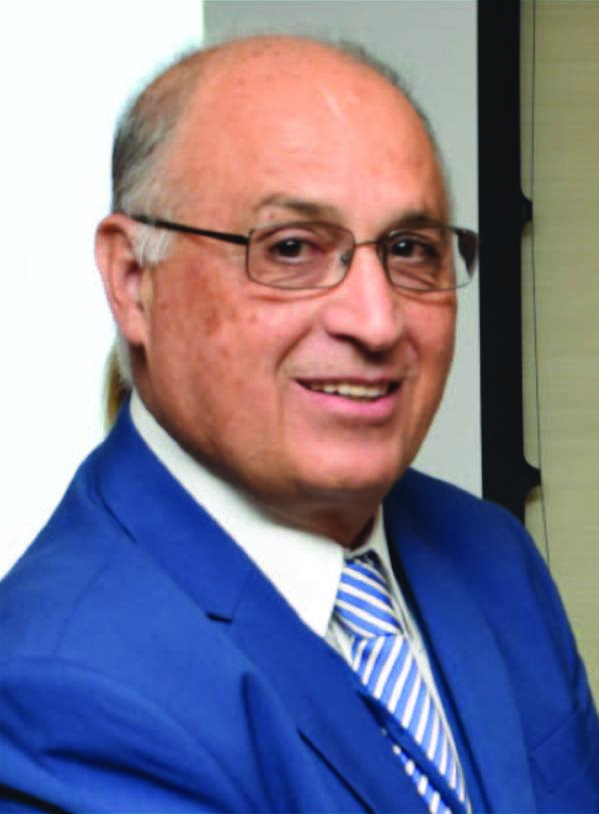
- Born: 13 April 1947 (age 79); Agios Konstantinos, Sparta, Greece
- Citizenship: Greek
- Education: Aristotle University of Thessaloniki, McGill University, University of Glasgow
- Spouse: Panayota D. Krempeniou
- Children: Two
- Scientific career
- Fields: Molecular oncology, Virology, Genetics, Cancer therapeutics, COVID
- Workplaces: University of Crete
- Thesis: Genetics and transcription of reovirus (1976)
- Website: www.demetriosspandidos.com

Demetrios A. Spandidos is a Greek virologist and cancer researcher. He is an emeritus professor at the University of Crete where he was professor of virology from 1989 till 2015. He is also the founder of Spandidos Publications and the editor-in-chief of all eight of its journals.

== Education ==
Spandidos received his bachelor's degree from the University of Thessaloniki in 1971, his PhD from McGill University in 1976, and a DSc from the University of Glasgow in 1989.

== Career ==
From 1976 to 1978, Spandidos worked as a postdoctoral fellow at the University of Toronto, working in the laboratory of Louis Siminovitch.

In 1978, Spandidos gave a presentation to a Dana Farber Cancer Institute seminar. In this presentation, Spandidos claimed to have proven that oncogenes were the root cause of all cancers. Robert Weinberg, a professor at the Massachusetts Institute of Technology, was in the audience when Spandidos gave this talk, and later recalled that he had devised what he called "exactly the same" strategy to identify oncogenes in human tumors not long before Spandidos' talk. Spandidos had published these findings in Cell a month prior to Weinberg having his idea, which, like Spandidos' paper, related to transfectable oncogenes.

Spandidos was forced to end his position at the University of Toronto in Siminovitch's laboratory due to accusations of fraud. Two postdocs in Siminovitch lab were unable to reproduce Spandidos' findings, and Spandidos did not present the raw data proving that he was innocent. However, Siminovitch did not initiate an independent investigation and the accusations have never been officially confirmed.

From 1978 to 1979, Spandidos was an assistant professor at the Hellenic Anticancer Institute in Athens, Greece. From 1979 to 1989, Spandidos worked at the Beatson Institute for Cancer Research, where he studied the Ras oncogene.

=== Previous and Present Positions ===
- 1972 - 1976 Graduate Student, Department of Biochemistry, McGill University, Montreal, Canada
- 1977 - 1978 Post-doctoral Fellow, University of Toronto, Toronto, Canada
- 1978 - 1979 Assistant Professor, Hellenic Anticancer Institute, Athens, Greece
- 1979 - 1981 Centennial Fellow (MRC Canada), Beatson Institute for Cancer Research, Glasgow, Scotland, UK where he studied the Ras oncogene.
- 1981 - 1988 Senior Scientist, the Beatson Institute for Cancer Research, Glasgow, Scotland, UK
- 1988 - 1998 Director, Laboratory of Molecular Oncology and Biotechnology, Institute of Biological Research and Biotechnology, The National Hellenic Research Foundation, Athens, Greece
- 1990 - 2013 Director, Laboratory of Clinical Virology, University Hospital, Heraklion, Greece
- 1989 - 2014 Professor of Virology, Medical School, University of Crete, Heraklion, Greece
- 2015–Present Professor Emeritus, Medical School, University of Crete, Greece

== 2021 ==
THE CANCER STORY - THE DISCOVERY OF CELLULAR ONCOGENES - Published by Spandidos Publications October 2021

== 2022 ==
Demetrios Spandidos is elected this year as a new member of Academia Europaea.

=== Spandidos Publications ===
In 1992, Spandidos established Spandidos Publications, a publisher of scientific journals. It currently publishes twelve journals: International Journal of Molecular Medicine, International Journal of Oncology, Molecular Medicine Reports, Oncology Reports, Experimental and Therapeutic Medicine, Oncology Letters, Biomedical Reports, Molecular and Clinical Oncology, World Academy of Sciences Journal, International Journal of Functional Nutrition, International Journal of Epigenetics and Medicine International Journal. Spandidos is the editor-in-chief of all of them.

- Special issues in honor of Spandidos were published in Critical Reviews in Oncogenesis in 2017 and in Experimental and Therapeutic Medicine in 2019.
- EDITORIAL of the International Journal of Oncology for 30 years of progress (1992-2021)

=== Honours and awards ===
- 1989 Corresponding member of the Academia National De Medicina De Buenos Aires, Argentina
- 2002 Doctor Honoris Causa of "Carol Davila" University of Medicine and Pharmacy, Bucharest, Romania
- 2004 Doctor Honoris Causa of "Iuliu Hatieganu" University of Medicine and Pharmacy, Cluj-Napoca, Romania
- 2013 Honorary Professor, Fujian University, P.R. China
- 2022 Member of the Academia Europaea
