= Agios Konstantinos =

Agios Konstantinos may refer to several places in Cyprus and Greece:

- Agios Konstantinos, East Attica
- Agios Konstantinos, Laconia, a village near Sparti, Greece
- Agios Konstantinos, Phthiotis
- Agios Konstantinos Marmaris, a settlement in Euboea, Greece
- Agios Konstantinos, Cyprus
- Agios Konstantinos, a town in Oropedio Lasithiou (Lasithi)
