= Sykopetra =

Sykopetra Συκόπετρα
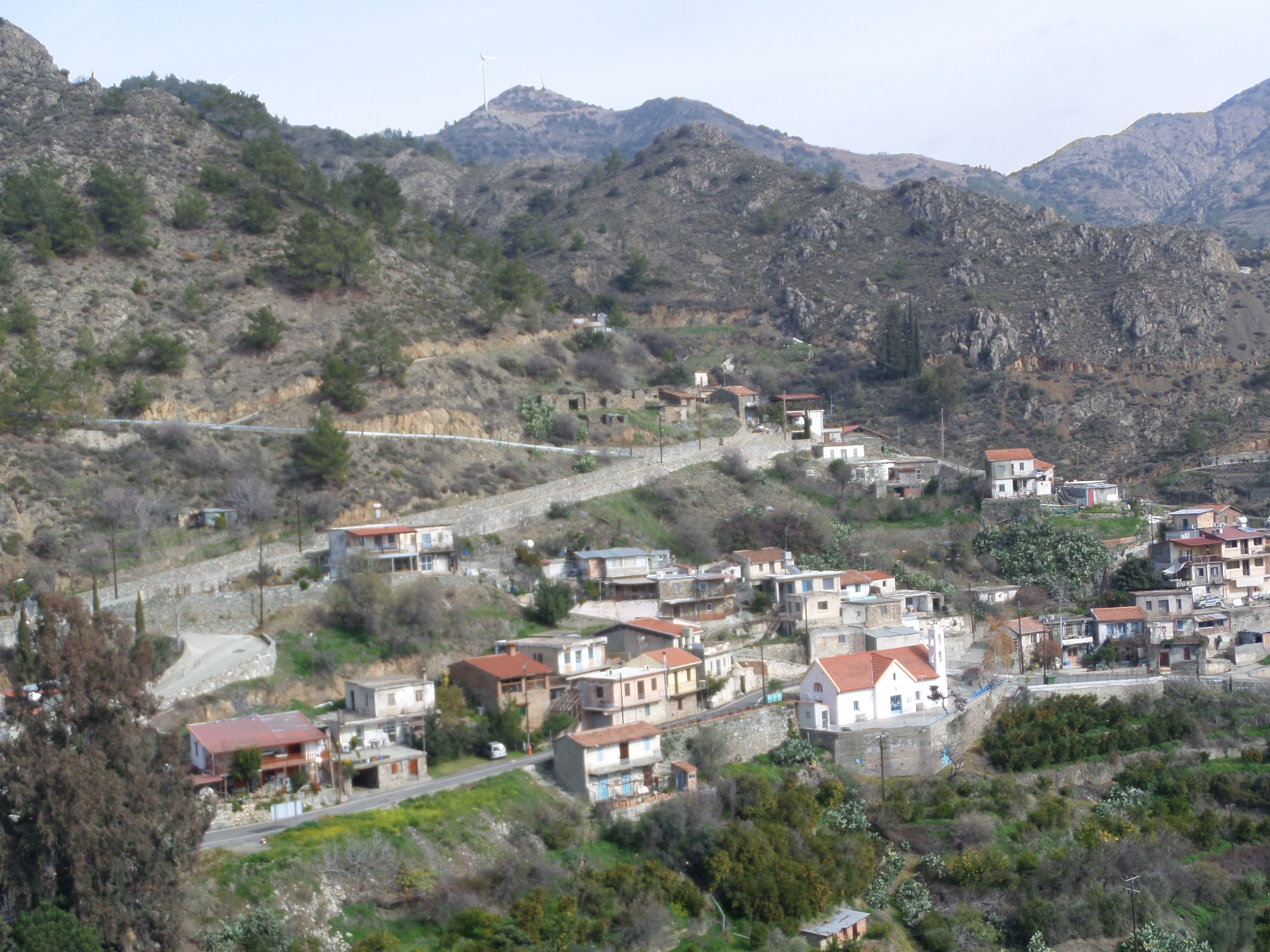

- Location in Cyprus
- Coordinates: 34°52′42″N 33°6′44″E
- Country: Cyprus
- District: Limassol District

Population (2011)
  - Total: 120
- Time zone: UTC+2 (EET)
  - Summer (DST): UTC+3 (EEST)

Sykopetra (Greek: Συκόπετρα) is a village in the Limassol District of Cyprus, located 5 km north of Arakapas.

== Location ==
Sykopetra is located 30 kilometres southeast of Limassol, in the geographical region of Pitsilia. It lies at the junction of the districts of Limassol, Nicosia, and Larnaca. The village is built at an altitude of 760 metres above sea level. It borders Arakapas to the south, Agios Konstantinos to the west, Palaichori to the north, Kampi to the northwest, and Melini and Odou to the east.

The settlement of Prophet Elias is included within the administrative boundaries of the village.

== History ==
According to archaeological finds from the area, the settlement of Sykopetra existed from the period of the Cypriot kingdoms (1050 BC–725 BC). Copper mining was also carried out near the village. Various place names attest to the continuous existence of the settlement from the Byzantine period through to the Ottoman rule of Cyprus. During the Frankish period, the village was granted to the Order of the Knights Templar and, later, in the 14th century, to the Order of the Knights Hospitaller.
