= International Journal of Hematology =

- Discipline: Hematology
- Language: English
- Edited by: Toshio Suda

Publication details
- History: 1937–present
- Publisher: Springer Japan (Japan)
- Impact factor: 1.942 (2017)

Standard abbreviations
- ISO 4: Int. J. Hematol.

Indexing
- CODEN: IJHEEY
- ISSN: 0925-5710 (print); 1865-3774 (web)
- LCCN: 91033431 sn 91033431
- OCLC no.: 24372334

Links
- Journal homepage

International Journal of Hematology is the official journal of the Japanese Society of Hematology. Since 2008, it has been published by Springer Japan, but used to be published by Carden Jennings.

It is not to be confused with International Journal of Laboratory Hematology and Oncology, International Journal of Laboratory Hematology or International Journal of Hematology-Oncology and Stem Cell Research.

== Indexing ==
International Journal of Hematology is indexed in the following databases:

- Abstracts in Anthropology
- Aquatic Sciences and Fisheries Abstracts
- Biological Abstracts
- BIOSIS
- CAB Abstracts
- CAB International
- Chemical Abstracts Service
- CSA/ProQuest
- Current Awareness in Biological Sciences
- Current Contents/Clinical Medicine
- Elsevier Biobase
- EMBASE
- Global Health
- Google Scholar
- IBIDS
- Index Copernicus
- INIS Atomindex
- Journal Citation Reports/Science Edition
- OCLC
- PubMed/MEDLINE
- Science Citation Index Expanded
- Scopus
- Summon by Serial Solutions
