= International Journal of Molecular Medicine =

- Discipline: General medicine
- Language: English

Publication details
- History: 1998–present
- Publisher: Spandidos Publications
- Frequency: Monthly
- Impact factor: 3.098 (2019)

Standard abbreviations
- ISO 4: Int. J. Mol. Med.

Indexing
- CODEN: IJMMFG
- ISSN: 1107-3756 (print); 1791-244X (web)

Links
- Journal homepage

International Journal of Molecular Medicine is a peer-reviewed academic journal published by Spandidos Publications.

In 2019 it had an impact factor of 3.098.

== Abstracting and indexing ==
The journal is indexed and/or abstracted in:

- Biological Abstracts
- BIOSIS Previews
- Biotechnology & Bioengineering Abstracts
- CAB Abstracts
- Cambridge Scientific Abstracts
- Chemical Abstracts Service/SciFinder
- CSA Biological Sciences Database
- CSA Environmental Sciences & Pollution Management Database
- Current Awareness in Biological Sciences
- Current Contents/Life Sciences
- EMBASE/Excerpta Medica
- Index Copernicus
- Index Medicus/MEDLINE/PubMed
- Journal Citation Reports
- PASCAL Database
- Science Citation Index
- SCOPUS
