= Astorre Baglioni =

Italian condotierro (1526–1571)

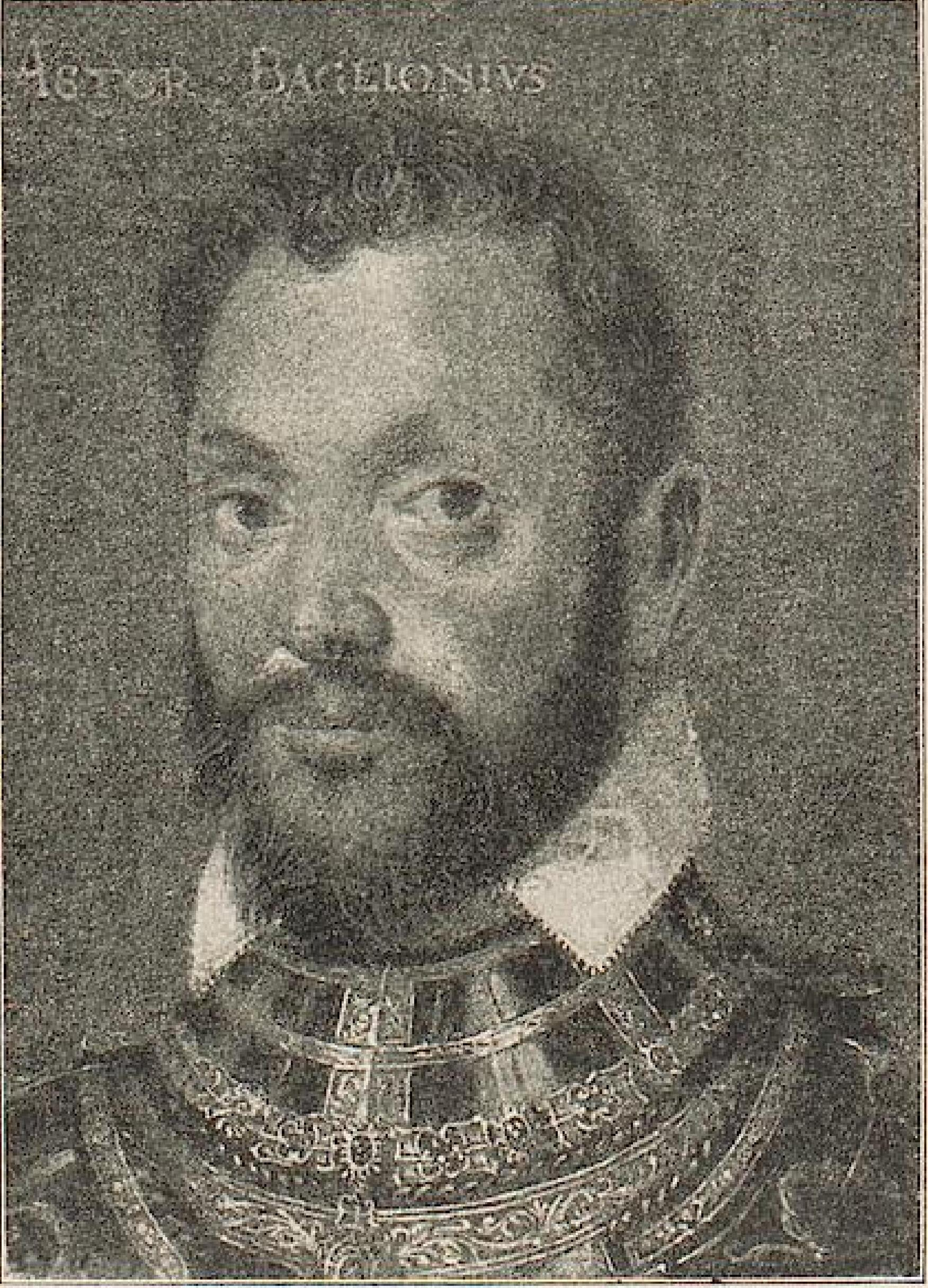
- Born: 3 March 1526; Perugia
- Died: 4 August 1571
- Occupation: Condottiere

Astorre Baglioni (March 1526 – 4 August 1571) was an Italian condottiero and military commander.

== Biography ==
He was born in Perugia, the son of Gentile Baglioni, a member of a condottieri family of central Italy. At the death of his father, he was first at Tagliacozzo under Ascanio Colonna, and then to Città di Castello where he was introduced to the military career by his uncle Alessandro Vitelli.

In 1540 he fought under the latter at Pest against the Turks. In 1550 he was on a frigate in a Christian fleet led by Carlo Sforza, to fight against the northern African raider Dragut. In August Baglioni was at the siege of Mahdia with Giordano Orsini. In 1556-1558 he was hired by the Republic of Venice, for which he supervised building of fortifications in the Venetian mainland and was governor of Verona.

In 1569 he was named governor of Nicosia in Cyprus.

In 1570, when a war between Venice and the Ottoman Empire was upcoming, he revised the fortifications of Cerines and Famagusta, of which Baglioni became governor, in collaboration with the city's rector Marcantonio Bragadin. In the same year the island was invaded by the Turks. Baglioni launched several counterattacks but was finally forced with his troops in the walls of Famagusta. After the fall of Nicosia, the Turks laid siege to Famagusta, and Baglioni launched a series of successful raids against the besiegers. The Turks lost some 52,000 men in five major assaults until, in late July, the Venetians, despairing to receive any rescue from the homeland, decided to surrender. The Turk commander, Lala Kara Mustafa Pasha, accorded the survivors to safely return to Crete, but he did not keep his word: Bragadin, Baglioni and other Venetian commanders were imprisoned, beaten and beheaded.

== See also ==
- Siege of Famagusta
- Venetian Cyprus
- Marcantonio Bragadin
- Stato da Mar

== Sources ==
- Tomitano, Bernardino (1572–1576). Vita e fatti di Astorre Baglioni. Venice.
- Oddi Baglioni, Alessandra (2009). Astorre II Baglioni - Guerriero e Letterato - Il Grifone e la Mezzaluna. Volumnia Editrice.
