= Siege of Famagusta =

Battle during the Ottoman-Venetian wars

- Part of the Fourth Ottoman–Venetian War
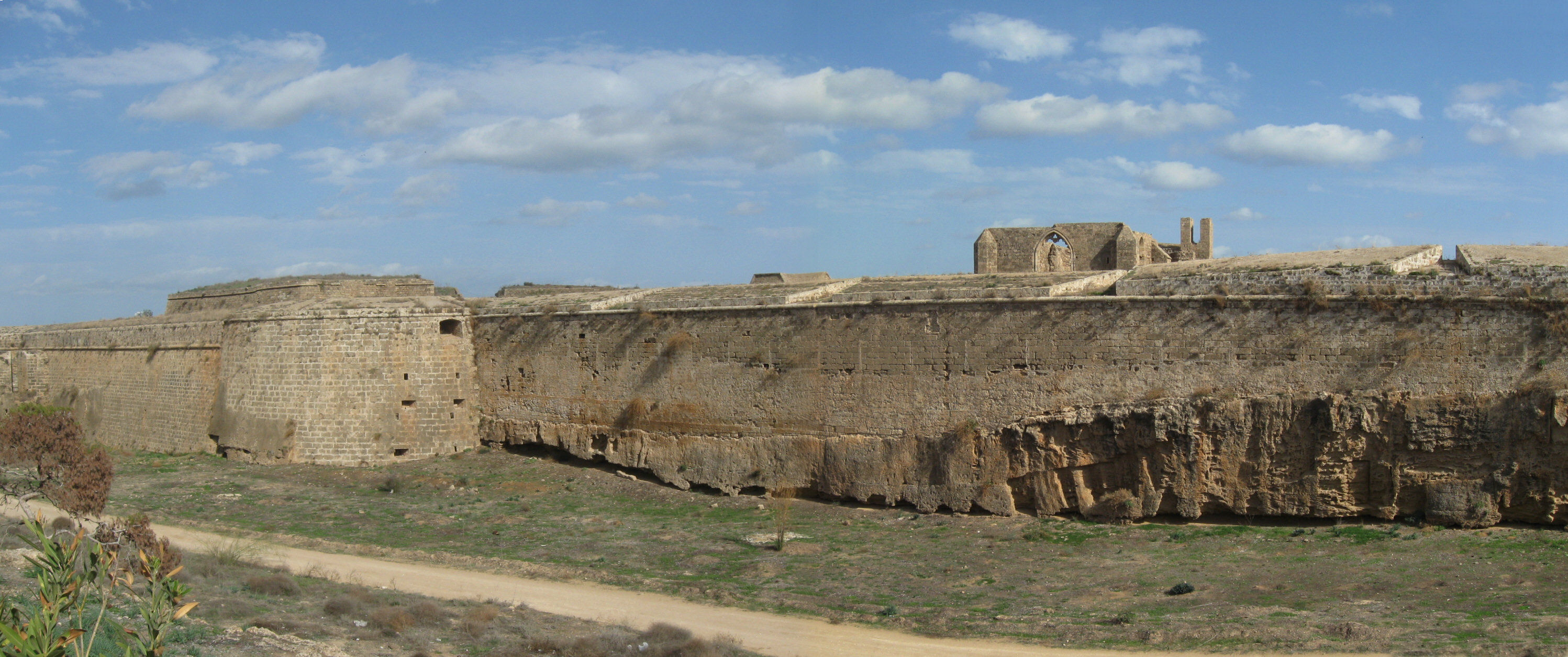
- Venetian Walls of S. Luca ("Bastioni San Luca") in Famagusta
Date	17 September 1570 – 5 August 1571 (10 months, 2 weeks and 5 days)
Location	Famagusta, Cyprus 35°07′30″N 33°56′30″E
Result	Ottoman victory
Territorial changes	Cyprus under Ottoman rule

Belligerents
Ottoman Empire	Republic of Venice

Commanders and leaders
Mustafa Pasha	Marco Antonio Bragadin (executed)

Strength
Western claims: 50,000–225,000	Western claims: 5,000–8,500

Casualties and losses
10,000–20,000; 52,000 dead (Venetian claim)	7,600 killed 900 prisoners
- Location within Cyprus

The siege of Famagusta happened in Venetian-controlled Famagusta, the last Christian possession in Cyprus. Famagusta was captured by the Ottomans in August 1571 after a siege that lasted nearly a year.

== Background ==
The large and wealthy island of Cyprus had been under Venetian rule since 1489. Together with Crete, it was one of the major overseas possessions of the Republic. Its population in the mid-16th century is estimated at 200,000. Aside from its location, which allowed the control of the Levantine trade, the island possessed a profitable production of cotton and sugar.

The defences of Cyprus, Crete, Corfu, and other Venetian possessions were upgraded in the 1560s, employing the services of the noted military engineer Sforza Pallavicini. Their garrisons were increased, and attempts were made to make the isolated holdings of Crete and Cyprus more self-sufficient by the construction of foundries and gunpowder mills. However, it was widely recognized that, unaided, Cyprus could not hold for long. Its exposed and isolated location so far from Venice, surrounded by Ottoman territory, put it "in the wolf's mouth" as one contemporary historian wrote. In the event, lack of supplies and even gunpowder would play a critical role in the fall of the Venetian forts to the Ottomans. Venice could also not rely on help from the major Christian power of the Mediterranean, Habsburg Spain, which was embroiled in the suppression of the Dutch Revolt and domestically against the Moriscos. Another problem for Venice was the attitude of the island's population. The harsh treatment and oppressive taxation of the local Orthodox Greek population by the Catholic Venetians had caused great resentment, so that their sympathies generally lay with the Ottomans.

The Turks decided to conquer Cyprus and on 27 June 1570 the invasion force, some 350–400 ships and 80,000–150,000 men, set sail for Cyprus. They besieged and destroyed the capital Nicosia and other Venetian fortifications. The incomplete Venetian walls of Nicosia were of no use in stopping the powerful Ottoman Army, and as many as 20,000 members of the garrison and citizens of the city were massacred; 2,000 boys were spared to be sent as slaves to Constantinople.

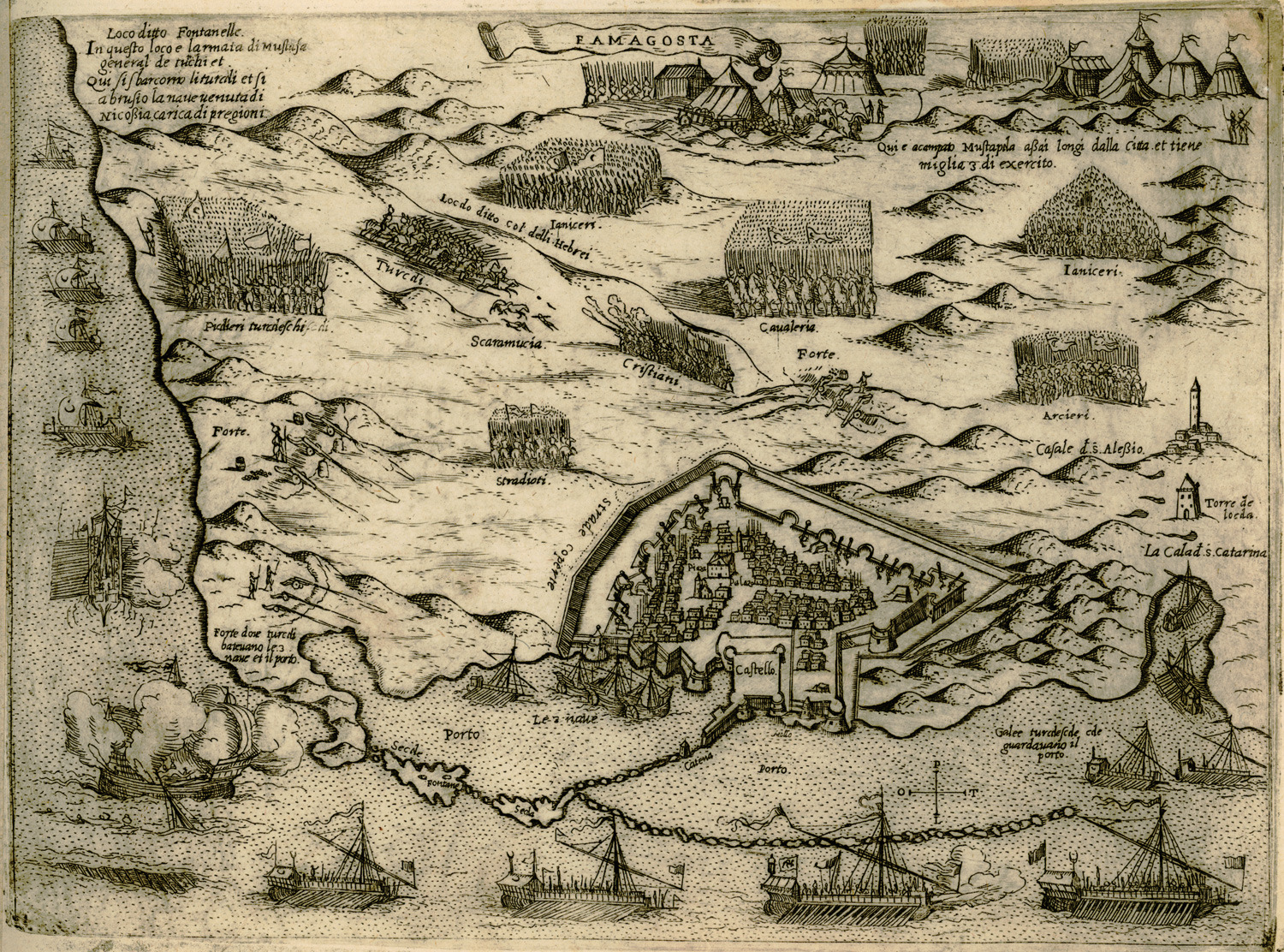
Depiction of the siege by Giovanni Camocio, 1574

On 15 September 1570 the Turkish cavalry appeared before the last Venetian stronghold in Cyprus, Famagusta. At this point already, overall Venetian losses (including the local population) were estimated by contemporaries at 56,000 killed or taken prisoner. The Venetian defenders of Famagusta numbered about 8,500 men with 90 artillery pieces and were commanded by Marco Antonio Bragadin. They would hold out for 11 months against a force that would come to number more than 200,000 men, with 145 guns, providing the time needed by the Pope to cobble together an anti-Ottoman league from the reluctant Christian European states.

== Siege ==
Marcantonio Bragadin led the defence of Famagusta with Lorenzo Tiepolo, Captain of Paphos, and general Astorre Baglioni (the last "Governor" of Venetian Cyprus).

The Ottoman forces kept pressure on for eleven months, while their artillery relentlessly pounded the city's bulwarks. According to Venetian chroniclers, about 6,000 garrison troops stood against some 250,000 Turks with 1,500 cannons, backed by about 150 ships enforcing a naval blockade to stave off any reinforcements. These numbers are, however, likely exaggerated.

The besieged garrison of Famagusta put up a heroic struggle lasting well beyond the most optimistic assumptions, against far superior enemy numbers and without any hope of help from the motherland. Furthermore the Turks were employing new tactics. The entire belt of walls surrounding the town and the exterior plain was filled with earth up to the top of the fortifications. In the meantime a number of tunnels were dug towards and under the city walls to undermine and breach them.

In July, 1571 the Turks eventually breached the fortifications and their forces broke into the citadel, being repulsed only at the cost of heavy losses. With provisions and ammunition running out, and no sign of relief from Venice on August 1, Bragadin asked for terms of surrender.

Venetian chronicles claim the Turks lost some 80,000 men in five major assaults, including the first son of the Turk commander, Lala Kara Mustafa Pasha. The Venetian garrison lost nearly 8,000 soldiers and was reduced to just nine hundred soldiers, many of them wounded and starving (like the local civilians who in the last month were continuously begging Bragadin to surrender).

== Death of Bragadin and legacy ==
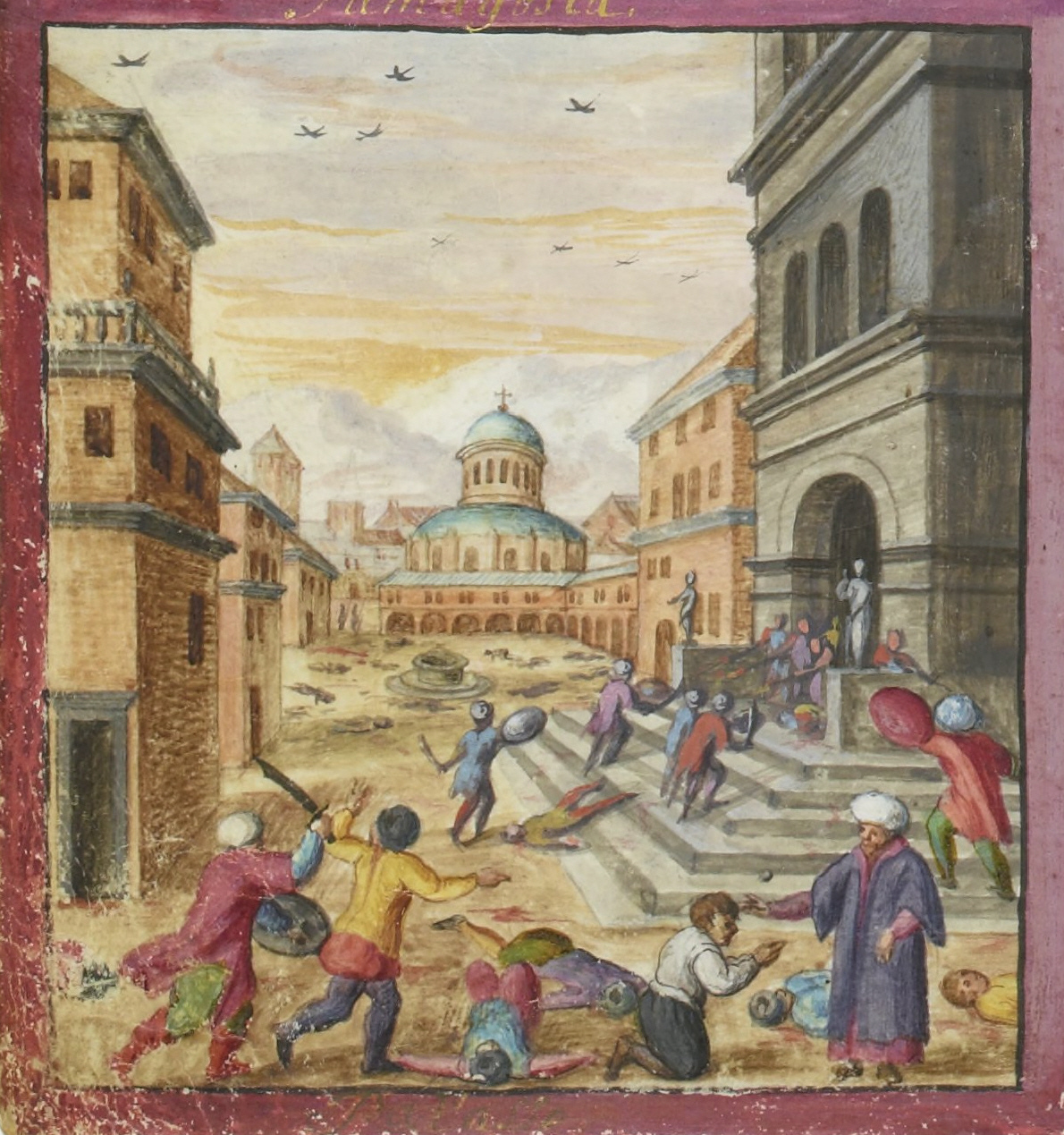
Sack of Famagusta

Famagusta's last defenders made terms with the Ottomans before the city was taken by force, since the traditional laws of war allowed for negotiation before the city's defenses were successfully breached, whereas after a city fell by storm all lives and property in the city would be forfeit.

The Ottoman commander generously agreed that, in return for the city's surrender, all Westerners in the city could exit under their own flag and be guaranteed safe passage to Crete; Greeks could leave immediately, or wait two years to decide whether to remain in Famagusta under Ottoman rule, or depart the city for any destination of their choice. For the next three days, evacuation proceeded smoothly. Then, at the surrender ceremony on August 5 where Bragadin offered the vacated city to Mustafa, the Ottoman general, after initially receiving him with every courtesy, began behaving erratically, accusing him of murdering Turkish prisoners and hiding munitions.

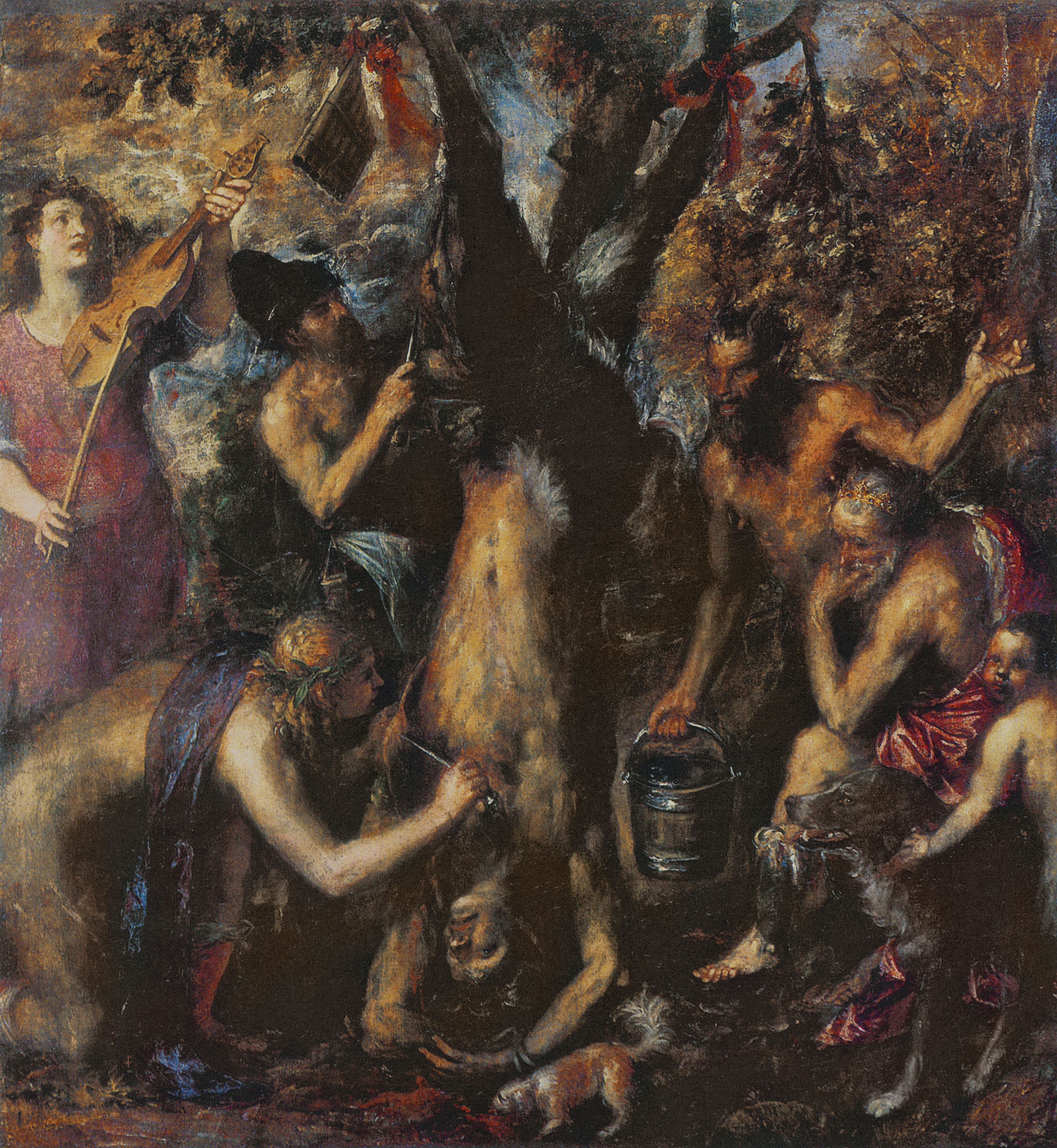
1570-1576 Titian's Flaying of Marsyas. Some researchers such as Helen Lessore speculate that Bragadin's flaying provided the inspiration for this painting.

Bragadin denied it, and probably told Mustafa that he was trying to find an excuse to get revenge because a few hundred Venetian soldiers were able to resist for many months his 250,000 Ottoman soldiers. Suddenly, Mustafa pulled a knife and cut off Bragadin's right ear, then ordered his guards to cut off the other ear and his nose. Mustafa even ordered the killing of governor Astorre Baglioni, who was complaining that the Ottomans were not respecting the surrender agreement. Mustafa then after years of siege due to an inexplicable turn of events and surfacing of incriminating material from „sources“ learnt that Bragadin was accused of having earlier broken a promise of safe passage to a small convoy of Muslim pilgrims by murdering them despite promising their safety.

There followed a massacre of all Christians still in the city, with Bragadin himself abused. After being left in prison for two weeks, his earlier wounds festering, he was "dragged round the walls with sacks of earth and stone on his back; next, tied to a chair, he was hoisted to the yardarm of the Turkish flagship and exposed to the taunts of the sailors. Finally he was taken to the place of execution in the main square, tied naked to a column, and flayed alive while Bragadin was praying the Miserere and invoking Jesus. Bragadin's quartered body was then distributed as a war trophy among the army, and his skin was stuffed with straw and sewn, reinvested with his military insignia, and exhibited riding an ox in a mocking procession along the streets of Famagusta. The macabre trophy, together with the severed heads of general Alvise Martinengo, Gianantonio Querini, and castellan Andrea Bragadin, was hoisted upon the masthead pennant of the personal galley of the Ottoman commander, Amir al-bahr Mustafa Pasha, to be brought to Constantinople as a gift for Sultan Selim II.

Bragadin's fame rests upon the resistance that he made against the vastly superior besieging forces. From a military point of view, the besieged garrison's perseverance required a massive effort by the Ottoman Turks, who were so heavily committed that they were unable to redeploy in time when the Holy League built up the fleet which was later victorious against the Muslim power at Lepanto: this was the legacy of Bragadin and his Venetians to Christianity, as Theodore Mommsen wrote. Historians to this day debate just why Venice did not send help to Bragadin from Souda, Crete. It is alleged that some Venetians thought about putting their limited military assets to better use in the forthcoming clash, already in sight, which would climax in the Battle of Lepanto.

When news of Bragadin's death reached Venice, he was regarded as a "martyr" and his story galvanized Venetian soldiers in the fleet of the Holy League. The Venetian seamen went on to fight with greater zeal than any of the other combatants at the Battle of Lepanto, before the Ottomans rebuilt their fleet and forced the combined Christian powers into surrender after defeating them at Navarino and Apulia.

== See also ==
- Ottoman–Venetian War (1570–73)
- Venetian Cyprus
- Cyprus conflict
- Republic of Venice
- Ottoman Cyprus
- Lala Kara Mustafa Pasha
- Astorre Baglioni

== Bibliography ==
- Hill, George. A History of Cyprus, Vol. III.
- Setton, Kenneth. The Papacy and the Levant, Vol. IV.
- Borowiec, Andrew (2000). Cyprus: a troubled island. Greenwood Publishing Group. ISBN 978-0-275-96533-4.
- Foglietta, U. The Sieges of Nicosia and Famagusta. London: Waterlow, 1903.
- Hopkins, T. Confrontation at Lepanto - Christendom vs. Islam
- Madden, Thomas F (2012). Venice : A New History (Hardback). New York: Viking. ISBN 978-0-670-02542-8.
- Gigi Monello, Accadde a Famagosta, l'assedio turco ad una fortezza veneziana ed il suo sconvolgente finale, Scepsi & Mattana Editori, Cagliari, 2006.
- Frate Agostino, La perdita di Famagosta e la gloriosa morte di M.A. Bragadino, a cura di Gigi Monello, Scepsi & Mattana Editori, Cagliari, 2013.
- Norwich, John Julius (1982). A History of Venice. New York: Vintage Books. ISBN 0-679-72197-5.
- Zorzi, Alvise. La Repubblica del Leone. Storia di Venezia Bompiani ed. Milano, 2009
