= Oncology Reports =

- Discipline: Oncology
- Language: English
- Edited by: Demetrios A. Spandidos

Publication details
- History: 1994–present
- Publisher: Spandidos Publications
- Frequency: Monthly
- Impact factor: 4.136 (2021)

Standard abbreviations
- ISO 4: Oncol. Rep.

Indexing
- CODEN: OCRPEW
- ISSN: 1021-335X (print); 1791-2431 (web)
- OCLC no.: 29502443

Links
- Journal homepage; Online archive

Oncology Reports is a peer-reviewed medical journal of oncology published monthly by Spandidos Publications. The editor-in-chief is Demetrios A. Spandidos. The journal was established in 1994.

== Abstracting and indexing ==
The journal is abstracted and indexed in:

- Biological Abstracts
- BIOSIS Previews
- Biotechnology & Bioengineering Abstracts
- Biowizard
- CAB Abstracts
- Cambridge Scientific Abstracts
- Chemical Abstracts Service
- CSA Biological Sciences Database
- CSA Environmental Sciences & Pollution Management Database
- Current Awareness in Biological Sciences
- Current Contents/Life Sciences
- EMBASE/Excerpta Medica
- Index Copernicus
- Index Medicus/MEDLINE/PubMed
- PASCAL
- Science Citation Index
- Scopus

According to the Journal Citation Reports, the journal has a 2021 impact factor of 4.136.
