= Critical Reviews in Eukaryotic Gene Expression =

- Discipline: Genetics
- Language: English
- Edited by: Gary S. Stein, Janet L. Stein, Jane B. Lian

Publication details
- History: 1990–present
- Publisher: Begell House
- Frequency: Quarterly
- Impact factor: 1.841 (2018)

Standard abbreviations
- ISO 4: Crit. Rev. Eukaryot. Gene Expr.

Indexing
- CODEN: CRGEEJ
- ISSN: 1045-4403
- LCCN: 90657467

Links
- Journal homepage

Critical Reviews in Eukaryotic Gene Expression is a quarterly scientific journal published by Begell House publishing reviews on topics related to gene regulation, organization, and structure within contexts of biological control and diagnosis/treatment of disease.

According to the Journal Citation Reports, its 2018 impact factor is 1.841. The editors-in-chief are Gary S. Stein, Janet L. Stein, and Jane B. Lian.
