= Critical Reviews in Oncogenesis =

- Discipline: Oncology
- Language: English
- Edited by: Benjamin Bonavida

Publication details
- History: 1989–present
- Publisher: Begell House
- Frequency: Quarterly

Standard abbreviations
- ISO 4: Crit. Rev. Oncog.

Indexing
- CODEN: CRONEI
- ISSN: 0893-9675
- OCLC no.: 15716210

Links
- Journal homepage

Critical Reviews in Oncogenesis is a quarterly scientific journal published by Begell House covering the field of oncology. The editor-in-chief is Benjamin Bonavida.
