= Oncology Letters =

- Discipline: Oncology
- Language: English
- Edited by: Demetrios Spandidos

Publication details
- History: 2010-present
- Publisher: Spandidos Publications
- Frequency: Monthly
- Impact factor: 1.554 (2014)

Standard abbreviations
- ISO 4: Oncol. Lett.

Indexing
- ISSN: 1792-1074 (print); 1792-1082 (web)

Links
- Journal homepage; Online archive

Oncology Letters is a monthly peer-reviewed medical journal covering all aspects of oncology. It was established in 2010 and is published by Spandidos Publications. The editor-in-chief is Demetrios Spandidos (University of Crete). According to the Journal Citation Reports, the journal has a 2022 impact factor of 3.11, ranking it 97th out of 211 journals in the category "Oncology".
