= International Journal of Oncology =

Monthly medical journal

- Discipline: Oncology
- Language: English
- Edited by: Demetrios A. Spandidos

Publication details
- History: 1992-present
- Publisher: Spandidos Publications
- Frequency: Monthly
- Impact factor: 5.650 (2020)

Standard abbreviations
- ISO 4: Int. J. Oncol.

Indexing
- ISSN: 1019-6439 (print); 1791-2423 (web)
- OCLC no.: 53915665

Links
- Journal homepage; Online archive

The International Journal of Oncology is a monthly peer-reviewed medical journal of oncology, published by Spandidos Publications. It was established in 1992 and the editor-in-chief is Demetrios A. Spandidos (University of Crete). According to the Journal Citation Reports, the journal has a 2020 impact factor of 5.650.
