= International Society for Laboratory Hematology =

Hematology non-profit organization

International Society for Laboratory Hematology (ISLH) is a non-profit organization founded in 1992 to provide a forum for the dissemination of new ideas and information related to the field of laboratory hematology.

== History ==
In 1984, Dr. Berend Houwen began organizing meetings that brought together scientists, manufacturers representatives, clinicians, and regulatory representatives to exchange ideas on technical innovations in laboratory hematology. The first meeting was held in Banff, Alberta, Canada.

At the time of incorporation, the founding members agreed to start a new journal for the publication of research and review articles in the broadening arena of laboratory hematology. In 2003, this journal, Laboratory Hematology, began to be officially indexed by the National Center for Biotechnology Information. The current journal, The International Journal of Laboratory Hematology, is the official journal of the ISLH. It provides an international forum for new developments in the practice and research of laboratory hematology and includes invited reviews, original articles, research results, and correspondence.

In 2001, the organization published the first flow-based reference method for platelet counting. In 2005, it published a document titled The International Consensus Group for Hematology Review: Suggested Criteria for Action Following Automated CBC and White Blood Cell Differential Analysis, which gathered 20 hematology laboratorians from around the globe to share their views on the slide review. ISLH also maintains affiliation with the International Committee for Standardization in Hematology (ICSH) and sponsors review studies in its field.

ISLH has also expanded its focus to include a number of sub-disciplines related to laboratory hematology, including cellular analysis, flow cytometry, hemostasis and thrombosis, molecular diagnostics, hematology informatics, hemoglobinopathies, hemolytic anemias, point-of-care testing, and standards and guidelines. ISLH addresses these with symposia, research, and journal reviews. As of 2015, the ISLH has about 900 members from more than 50 countries. The society organizes annual international scientific meetings held in the United States, Europe or Asia.

== ISLH Annual Symposium ==
The meeting, held annually in the spring, brings together laboratory hematologists professionals from around the world to discuss critical issues in laboratory hematology. The symposium features a combination of invited speakers, oral and poster presentations presentations, and commercial exhibits/workshops.
