= Agios Konstantinos, Cyprus =

Agios Konstantinos Άγιος Κωνσταντίνος
- Village
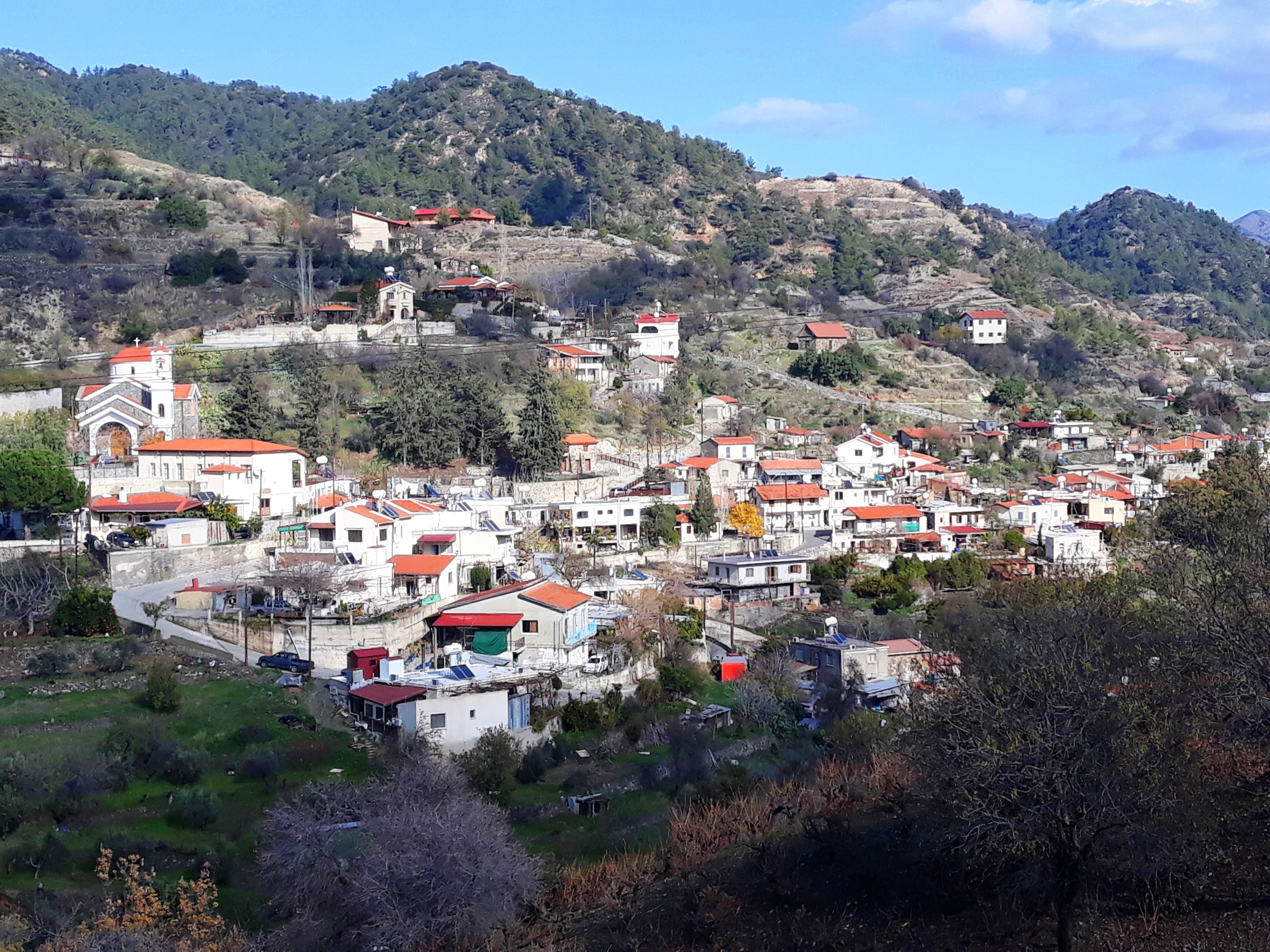

- Location in Cyprus
- Coordinates: 34°52′2″N 33°3′58″E
- Country: Cyprus
- District: Limassol District

Population (2001)
  - Total: 164
- Time zone: UTC+2 (EET)
  - Summer (DST): UTC+3 (EEST)

Agios Konstantinos (Greek: Άγιος Κωνσταντίνος) is a village in the Limassol District of Cyprus, located 7 km east of Kalo Chorio.

== History ==
The area where the village is located has been inhabited since ancient times. Settlements once stood to the north of the present village, the remains of which have been discovered. These settlements were situated in the localities known as Tsinties, Larmarka, and Kleionerata.

Agios Konstantinos developed during the Byzantine period. During the Arab raids, the inhabitants of the earlier settlements moved closer to the village's present location for safety. The village later became a fief administered by the Knights Templar. It was subsequently transferred to the Knights Hospitaller, along with another forty-six villages.

During the Ottoman period, the village’s population declined as a result of the widespread devastation that affected all of Cyprus, including looting and massacres. Its population increased again under British rule, owing to the construction of irrigation works, such as water reservoirs, and the building of new houses.
