= Ottoman Cyprus =

Ottoman province (1571–1914)

Eyalet-i Ḳıbrıs 1571–1670 1745–1748 Ḳıbrıs Sancağı 1670–1703 1784–1914
- Eyalet/Sanjak of the Ottoman Empire
- 1571–1914
- Flag (after 1844) Coat of arms

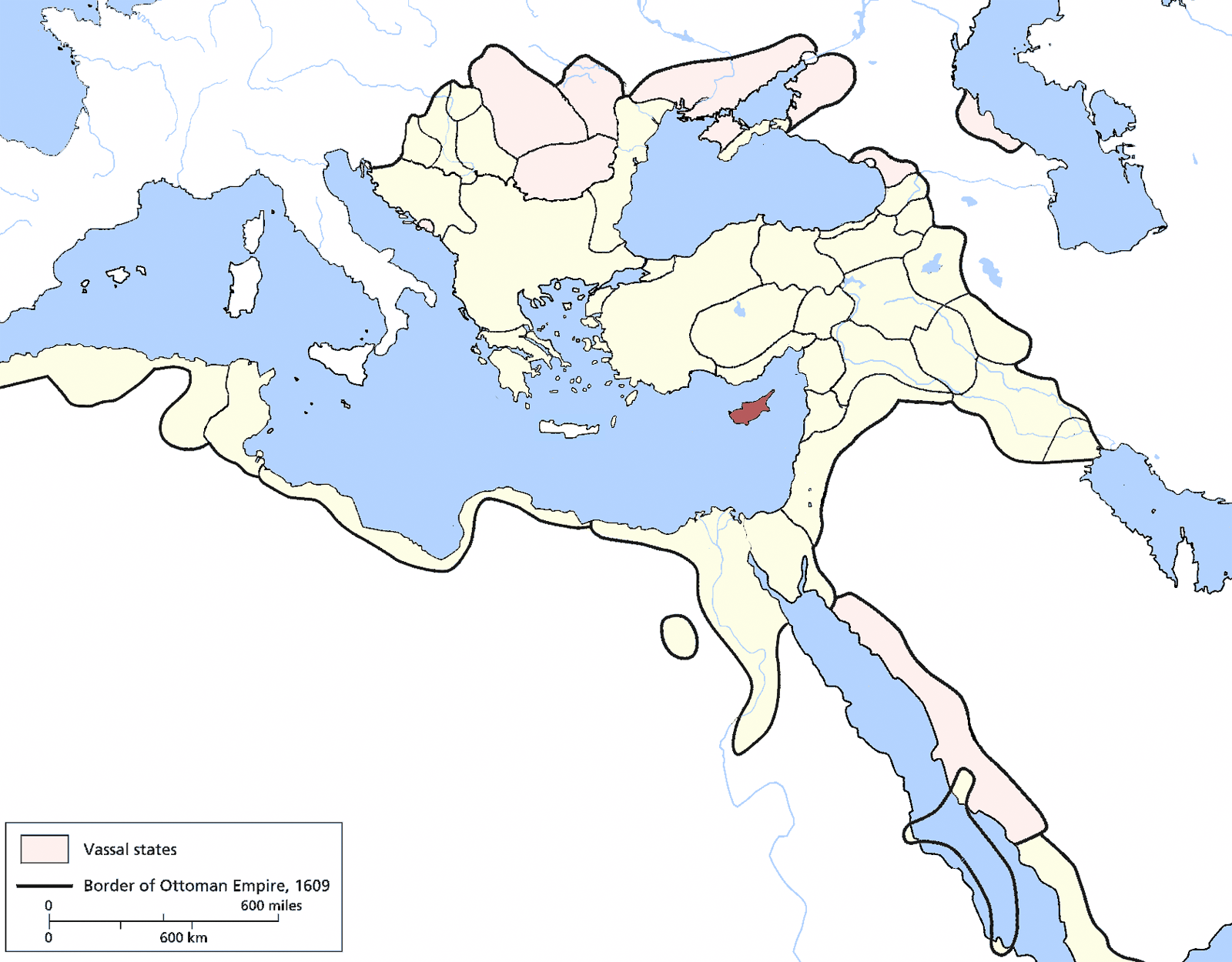
- Ottoman Cyprus in 1609 in red. The rest of the Ottoman Empire in light-yellow
- Capital: Nicosia
- History
  - Established: 1571
  - Disestablished: 1914
Preceded by	Succeeded by
Venetian Cyprus	British Cyprus
- Today part of: Cyprus; Akrotiri and Dhekelia

The Eyalet of Cyprus (Ottoman Turkish: ایالت قبريس, Eyālet-i Ḳıbrıs) was an eyalet/province of the Ottoman Empire made up of the island of Cyprus, which was annexed into the Empire in 1571. The Ottomans changed the way they administered Cyprus multiple times. It was a sanjak/sub-province (قبرس سنجاغی, Ḳıbrıs Sancağı) of the Eyalet of the Archipelago from 1670 to 1703, and again from 1784 to 1914; a fief of the Grand Vizier (1703–1745 and 1748–1784); and again an eyalet for the short period from 1745 to 1748.

== Ottoman raids and conquest ==
During Venetian rule, the Ottomans at times raided Cyprus. In 1489, the first year of Venetian control, Ottomans attacked the Karpass Peninsula, pillaging and taking captives to be sold into slavery. In 1539 the Ottoman fleet attacked and destroyed Limassol. Fearing the ever-expanding Ottoman Empire, the Venetians had fortified Famagusta, Nicosia, and Kyrenia, but most other cities were easy prey.

In the summer of 1570, the Ottomans struck again, but this time with a full-scale invasion rather than a raid. About 60,000 troops, including cavalry and artillery, under the command of Lala Mustafa Pasha landed unopposed near Limassol on July 2, 1570, and laid siege to Nicosia. The city fell on September 9, 1570; 20,000 Nicosians were massacred and every church, public building, and palace was looted. Only women and boys who were captured to be sold as slaves were spared.

Word of the massacre spread, and a few days later Mustafa took Kyrenia without having to fire a shot. The citizens of Famagusta, on the other hand, led by Venetian commander Marco Antonio Bragadin, put up a heroic resistance which led to the siege of the city for about a year, from September 1570 until August 1571. When the Ottomans eventually breached the fortifications, a massacre of most remaining Christians in the city followed, despite the Ottoman commander previously agreeing that in return for the city's surrender, Christians would be guaranteed safe passage to Crete. Bragadin had his ears and nose cut off and, after being thrown in prison for two weeks, he was dragged round the walls with sacks of earth and stone on his back, then tied naked to a column in the main square and skinned alive.

The fall of Famagusta marked the end of the Venetian rule and the beginning of the Ottoman period in Cyprus, with Lala Mustafa Pasha becoming the island’s first Turkish Governor.

On 25 May 1571, Pope Pius V formed the Holy League, a coalition between the Papal States, Malta, Habsburg Spain, the Republic of Venice, the Republic of Genoa, and some other Italian states. Four months later, on 7 October, the naval forces of the League, composed mainly of Venetian, Spanish, and Papal ships under the command of Don John of Austria, defeated the Turkish fleet at the Battle of Lepanto in one of the decisive battles in general — and naval battles in particular — of world history. The victory over the Ottomans, however, came too late to help Cyprus, and the island remained under Ottoman rule for the next three centuries.

In 1573 the Venetians left Cyprus, removing the influence of the Roman Catholic Church.

== Administrative history ==
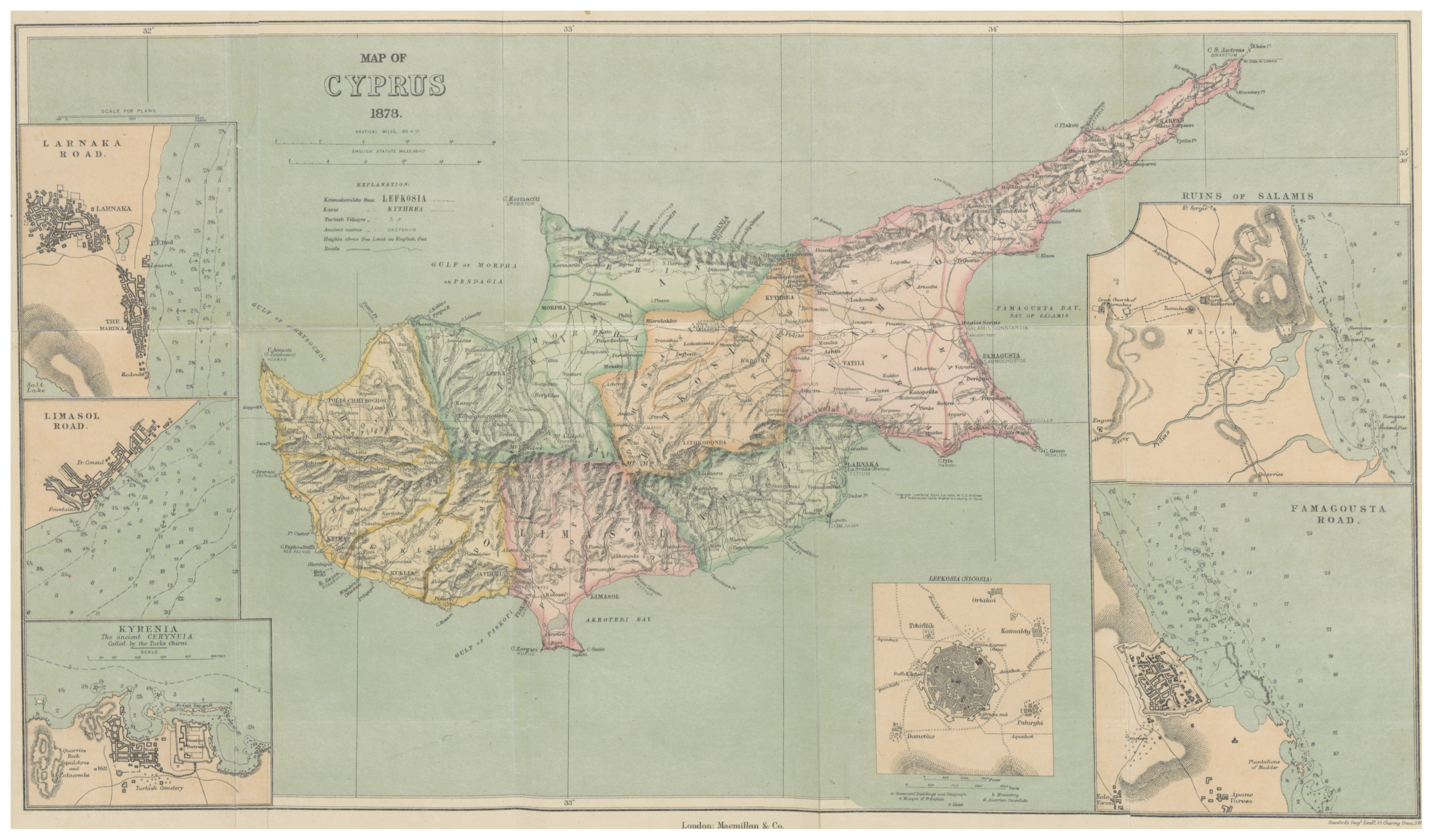
Administrative map of Cyprus drawn by the British in 1878, showing the Ottoman administrative division of the island at the time of the handover

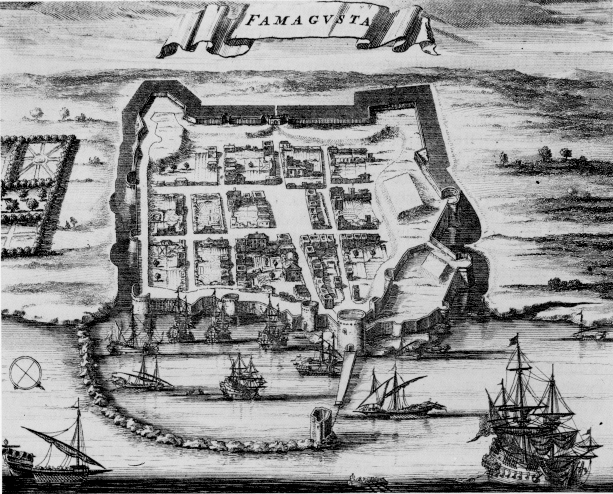
Chalcography depicting Famagusta in 1703

As soon as Nicosia was conquered, Cyprus was declared an eyalet under the administration of a beylerbey, and Lala Mustafa Pasha, the former beylerbey of Avlonya, was appointed to the post. Cyprus was divided into three sanjaks: Famagusta, Kyrenia and Paphos. Additionally, the sanjaks of Alâiye, Tarsus, İçel, Sis, Zülkadriye and Tripoli (Trablusşam) on the mainland were placed under the administration of the Cyprus eyalet. Cyprus was also divided into several kazas: Tuzla, Limassol, Episkopi, Kythrea, Paphos, Kukla, Lefka, Morphou, Hirsofu, Famagusta, Kyrenia and Mesariye.

These kazas each had their own kadı or naib. The sanjak of Tripoli, however, was removed from the jurisdiction of Cyprus in 1573 due to its distance and given to the Damascus Eyalet. The sanjaks of İçel, Alâiye and Tarsus were also removed in 1610 and given to the newly created Adana Eyalet.

However, after the Ottoman conquest of Crete, the Cypriot Orthodox Church argued that Cyprus had lost importance, that trade volume had decreased and that people were emigrating. It thus requested a change in the administrative status as Cyprus could not afford remaining an eyalet. Thus, in 1670, Cyprus became a sanjak under the Eyalet of the Archipelago, under the direct control of the Kapudan Pasha, the head of the Ottoman Navy. This control was exercised through an appointed mütesellim. However, under this system, local aghas were the tax collectors. This magnified their power and resulted in discontent, with the rivalry between them causing a two-year long revolt in the 1680s, led by Boyacıoğlu Mehmed Agha. This proved that the existing system caused a power vacuum and was ineffective, so in 1703 Cyprus was placed directly under the control of the Grand Vizier, administered on his behalf by a muhassıl. To reduce the powers of the aghas, the muhassıl was given the power to collect taxes, as well as increased political and military authority. Between 1745 and 1748, Cyprus briefly became an eyalet again. These three years, especially the reign of governor Ebubekir Pasha (1746–48), were a period of development and relative prosperity. After the end of Ebubekir Pasha's tenure, Cyprus reverted to its former status.

Greek Cypriots had two very important administrative positions: the Archbishop, who headed the Orthodox Church, was recognized as the sole representative of the Greek Cypriot population from the 1670s onwards, and the Dragoman, chosen from the candidates determined by the Archbishop.

The muhassıl administration slowly became more and more dysfunctional. In 1764, muhassıl Çil Osman Agha was killed amidst a chaotic environment caused by his rule. Meanwhile, the ongoing war with Russia meant a deterioration in the people's welfare. Thus, on the request of the Archbishop and the Dragoman, Cyprus was placed directly under the administration of the Imperial Council in 1785, with the muhassıl being directly appointed. These new muhassıls lacked some of their old powers, which greatly increased the influence of the Orthodox clergy as they became tax collectors. In 1839, with the reforms of Abdülmecid I, the island once again became a sanjak of the Eyalet of the Archipelago but gained significant autonomy. The island was governed by a mutasarrıf, the kazas were consolidated into six larger kazas with their own administrative and judicial councils. A sanjak administrative council, in which Turks, Greeks and other minorities were proportionally represented, was established.

In 1861, Cyprus became an independent mutasarrifate under the direct control of the Sublime Porte. However, this changed again in 1868, when Cyprus became a sanjak under the Vilayet of the Archipelago under the newly established vilayet system. This would not last long, as the vilayet was administered from Çanakkale, and the long distance made the administration impractical. With the efforts of Archbishop Sophronios III of Cyprus, as well as given the drought and ravages of locusts, Cyprus was made an independent mutasarrifate once again in 1870. This arrangement lasted until 1878, when the British took over the island.

== Social history ==
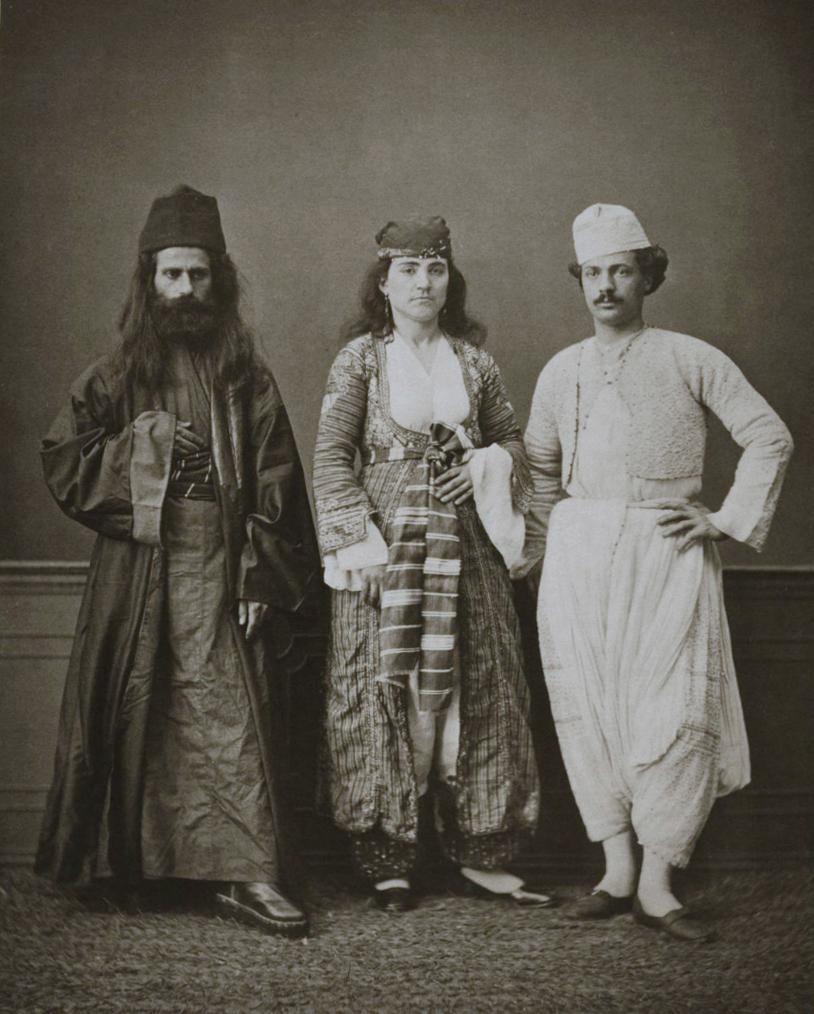
Traditional clothing of (from right to left) a Christian resident of Famagusta, a Christian woman from Famagusta, and a Greek monk of the Kykkos Monastery, near Lefka, 1873

The Ottoman occupation brought about two radical changes to the history of the island: A new ethnic element appeared on the island, the Turks, while Cypriots now had a new ruler, the Ottomans.

The Ottoman Empire gave timars—land grants—to soldiers under the condition that they and their families would stay there permanently. An action of far-reaching importance because the predefined soldiers became the nucleus of the island's Turkish community. During the 17th century the Turkish population grew rapidly, partly by Greek conversion (including converts who retained some pre-Islamic practices) joined to them. Most of the Turks who had settled on the island during the three centuries of Ottoman rule remained when control of Cyprus—although not sovereignty—was ceded to Britain in 1878. The distinction between the two groups was by both religion and language.

The Ottomans applied the millet system to Cyprus, which allowed religious authorities to govern their own non-Muslim minorities. This system reinforced the position of the Orthodox Church as the ethno-religious institution of the ethnic Greek population. Gradually, the Archbishop of Cyprus became not only religious but ethnic leader as well, something the Ottoman Turks promoted, wanting to have somebody responsible for the loyalty of the Greek flock. In this way, the Church undertook the task of the guardian of the Greek cultural legacy until the island was ceded to Britain.

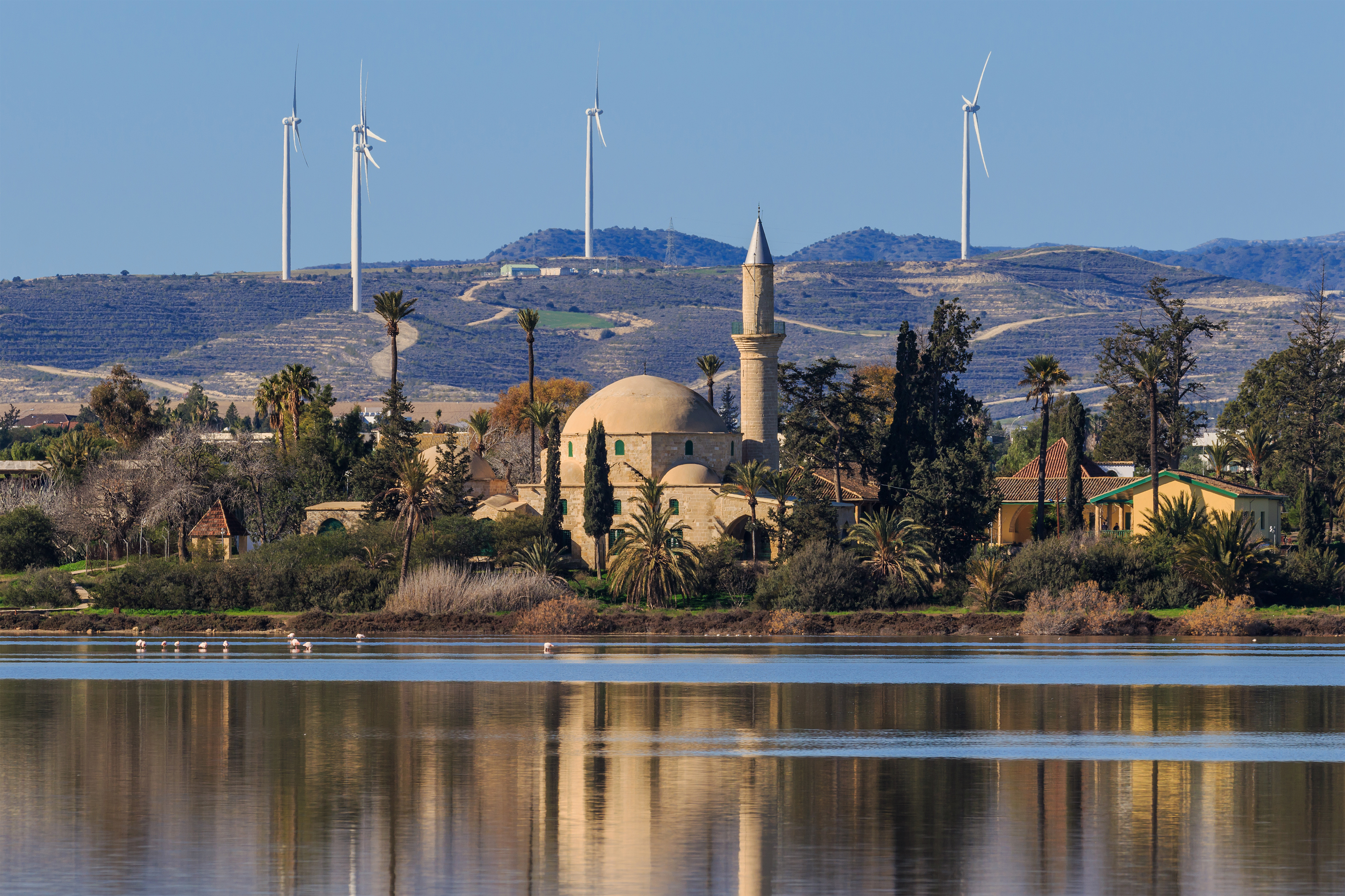
The Hala Sultan Tekke, built in 1817, was one of many landmarks constructed by the Ottoman Turks in Cyprus.

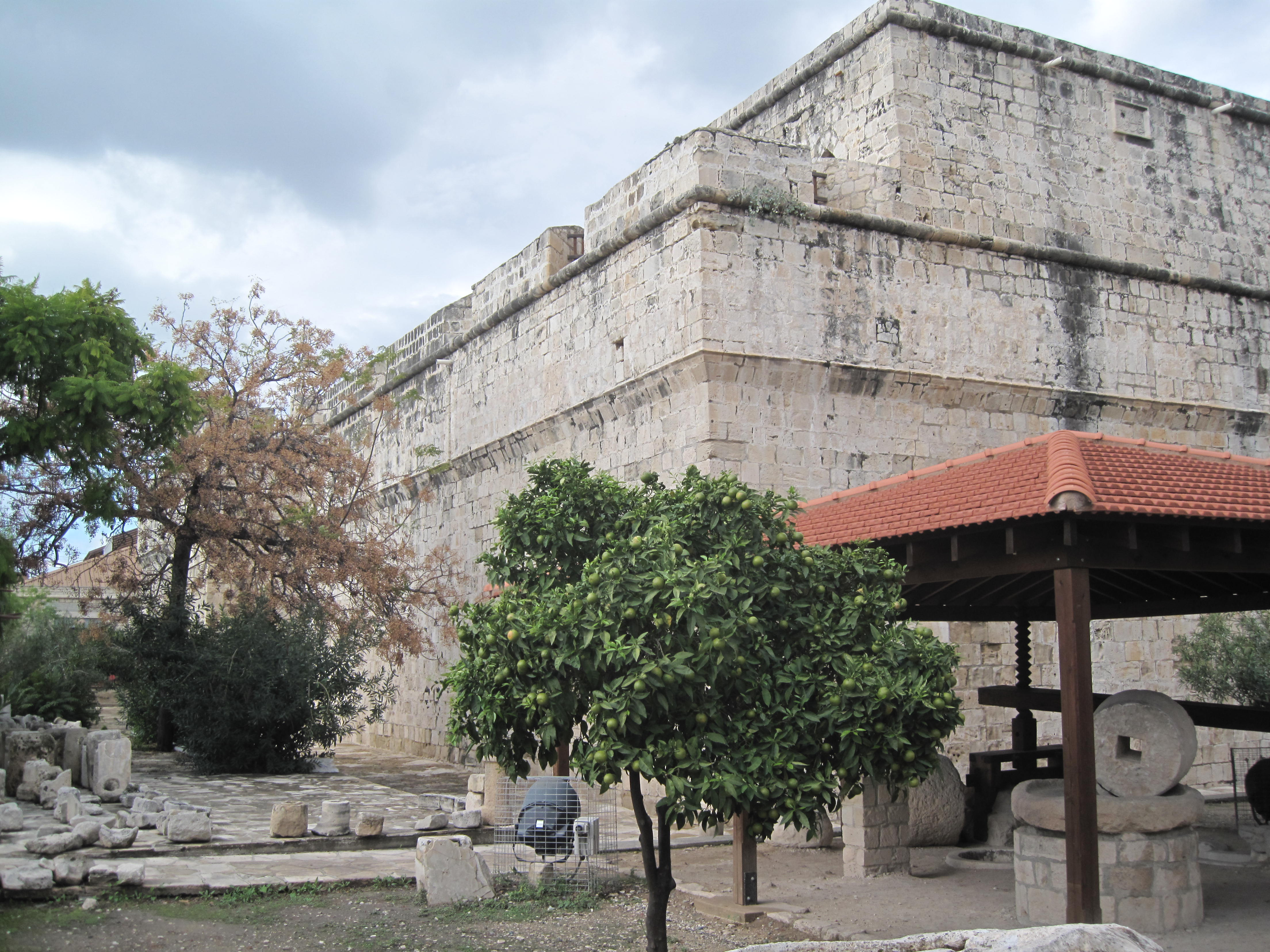
The Limassol Medieval Castle was rebuilt in 1590 by the Ottomans.

== Greek independence movement ==
=== 1821–1829 ===
Many Greek Cypriots supported the Greek independence effort that began in 1821, leading to severe reprisals by the Ottoman Empire. On 15 October 1821, a massive Turkish mob seized and hanged an archbishop, five bishops, thirty six ecclesiastics, and hanged most of the Greek Cypriots in Larnaca and the other towns. In April 1822, Egyptian soldiers were sent to Cyprus to replace Ottomans and by September 1822, sixty-two Cypriot villages and hamlets had entirely disappeared.

=== 1869–1878 ===
In 1869 the Suez Canal opened, and the United Kingdom showed increasing interest in the island, which is situated in what had suddenly become a very convenient location. When the Ottomans were defeated by the Russians in 1877 and the Berlin Congress took place the next year in order to revise the Treaty of San Stefano which was signed by Russia and the Ottoman Empire according to terms dictated by the former, it was officially announced on 9 July 1878 that on the 4th of preceding June, the British and the Sultan had secretly countersigned the Convention of Constantinople by virtue of which the possession and administration of Cyprus was vested in Great Britain. As exchange for control of Cyprus, the UK agreed to support the Ottoman Empire in the Russian-Turkish War. This agreement was formalised as the Cyprus Convention.

== Architecture and public works ==
=== Architecture ===
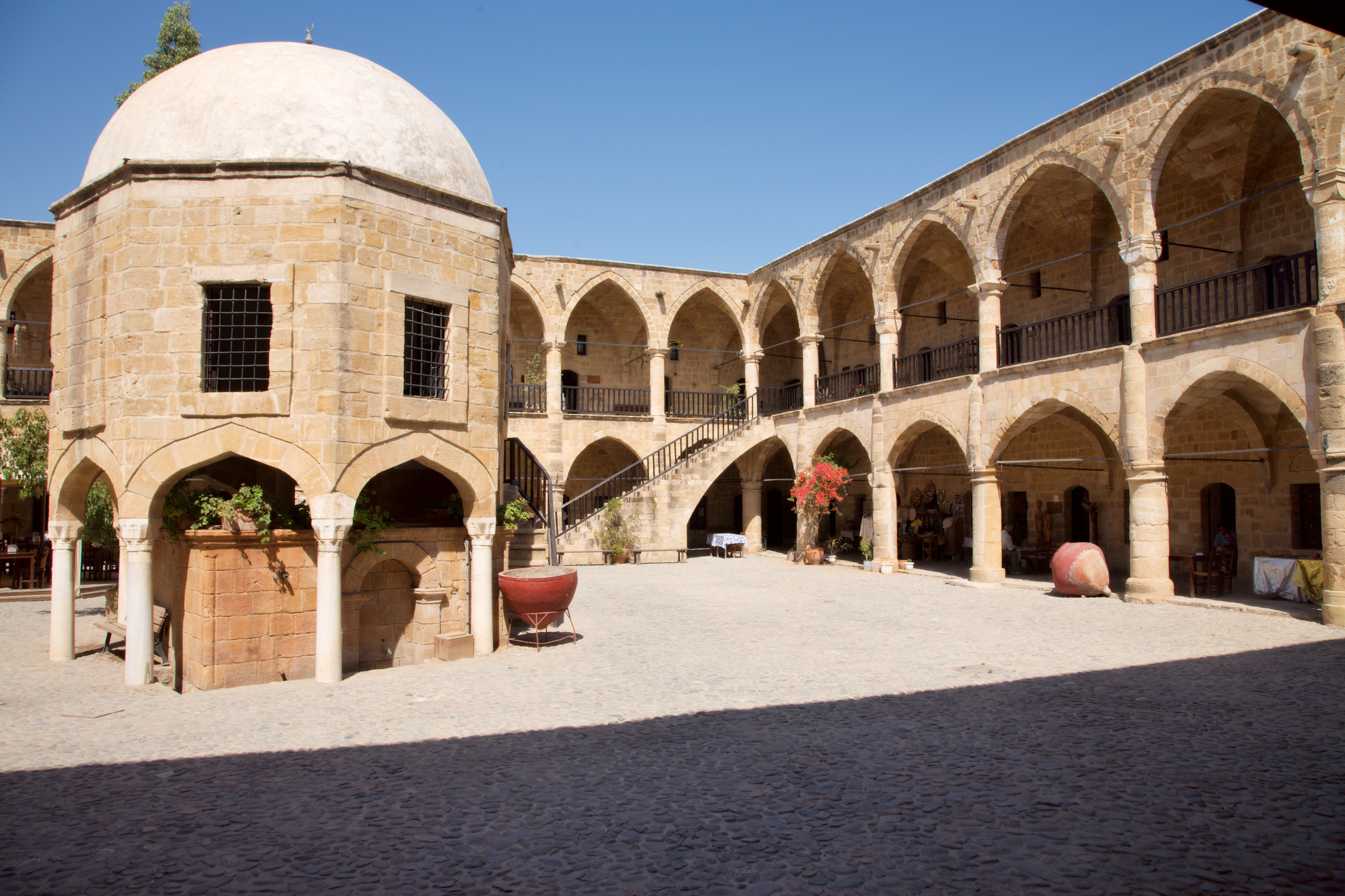
Büyük Han

During the Ottoman era, numerous mosques, masjids, churches, public baths, bazaars, caravanserais, medreses, schools and libraries were built in Cyprus. Ottoman architecture in Cyprus is closely linked to mainstream Ottoman architecture, however, there are some features that make it distinctly Cypriot. This stems from the fact that, whilst leaving Greek Orthodox churches intact, many buildings used by the Catholics, built in Gothic architecture, were converted into mosques or palaces, such as the Lala Mustafa Pasha Mosque in Famagusta and Selimiye Mosque in Nicosia. These buildings were later modified for use and thus synthesised with distinctly Ottoman elements. Gothic architecture also influenced Ottoman architecture in the island as Gothic elements were used by the Ottomans, such as in the minaret of Cami Kebir in Larnaca.

The two surviving caravanserais are the monumental Büyük Han and Kumarcilar Han in Nicosia, considered to be some of the finest examples of Ottoman architecture in the island. The best known of the many libraries is the Library of Mahmud II. Bazaars were very important parts of Ottoman commercial lives and in 1872, 23 bazaars were present in Nicosia alone, each with its own specialty. In 1883, waqf reports published by the British authorities in Cyprus listed 81 mosques that belonged to the Evkaf Administration in Cyprus. This figure is believed to be a major underestimation by archaeologist Tuncer Bağışkan. Two of the most prominent Muslim religious sites built in the Ottoman period are Hala Sultan Tekke in Larnaca and Arab Ahmet Mosque in Nicosia.

=== Infrastructure ===
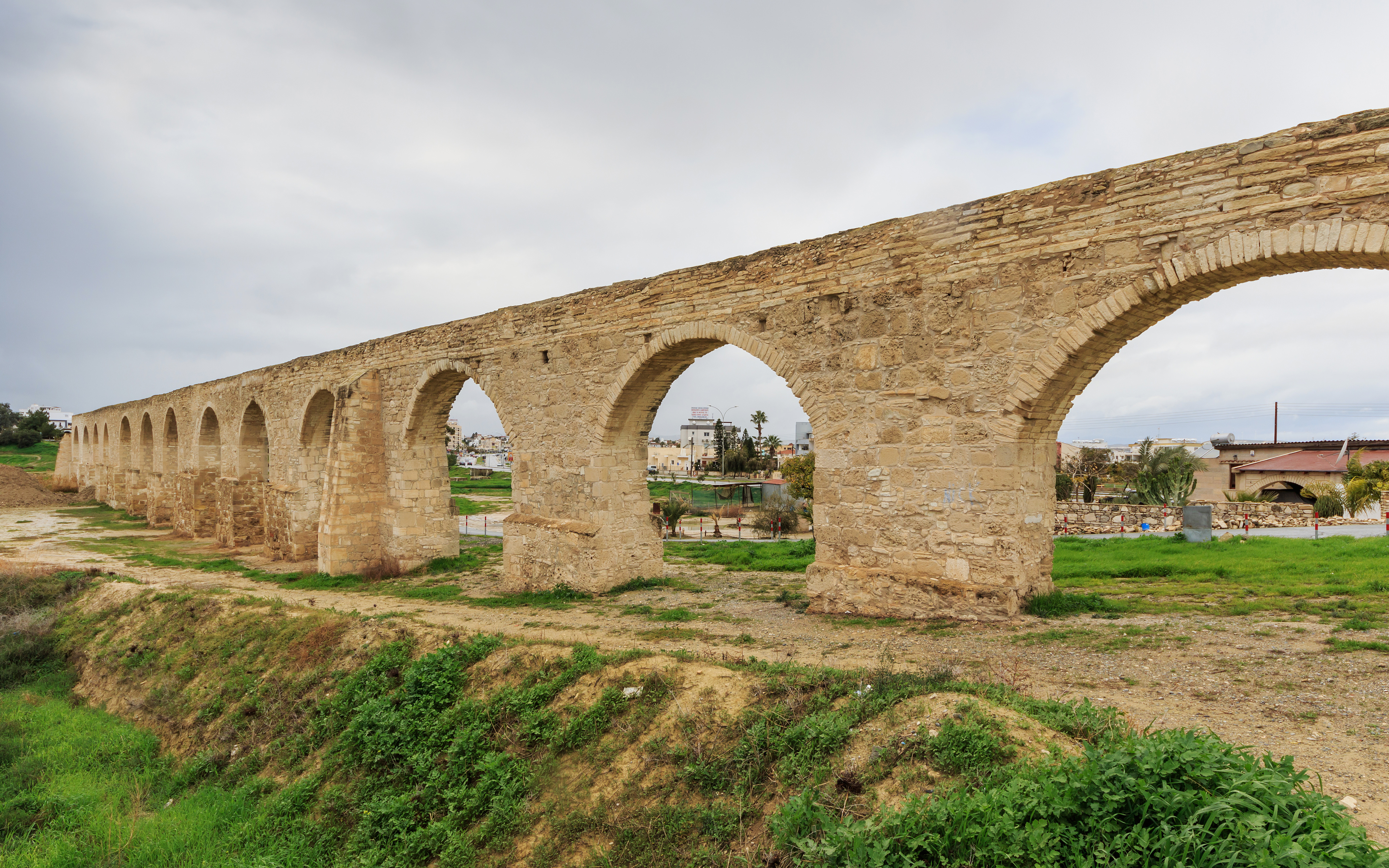
Bekir Pasha Aqueduct

The Ottoman administration brought a significant improvement to Cyprus in terms of water supply. The most notable example of this is the Bekir Pasha Aqueduct, built under the auspices of Ebubekir Pasha between 1746 and 1748. This aqueduct supplied fresh water to Larnaca and prior to its construction, local residents had to carry water on their backs for two hours. Silihtar aqueduct, built between 1801 and 1803, and the Arab Ahmet aqueduct supplied water to Nicosia.

The authorities also encouraged the construction and improvement of artificial channels for water supply and irrigation, which greatly increased crop yield and allowed large-scale fruit production. Among villages described as prosperous due to artificial irrigation upon the British takeover of the island are Morphou, Lapithos, Polis, Lefka, Avdimou and Kolossi. Samuel Baker, who visited Cyprus in 1879, noted "mills turned by water" and "narrow lanes streaming with water" in Lefka. He also wrote that "every garden and farm was irrigated by water conducted from the mountains in artificial channels" in the northern slopes of the Kyrenia Mountains extending to the Karpas Peninsula. In Karavas, streams were diverted into artificial channels to supply water to the village.

In the 19th century, a major effort was undertaken by a series of Ottoman governors to straighten and regulate the course of the Pedieos. Edhem Pasha, who served as governor in the 1840s, completed the construction of the Larnaca-Nicosia road and several bridges. Governor Mehmet Halet in the 1850s further improved the road network and harbour of Larnaca and established a grain store and market in Nicosia to encourage cattle breeding.

== See also ==
- Hadjigeorgakis Kornesios Mansion
- Siege of Famagusta
- Cyprus conflict
