= Marco Antonio Bragadin =

Venetian lawyer and soldier (1523–1571)

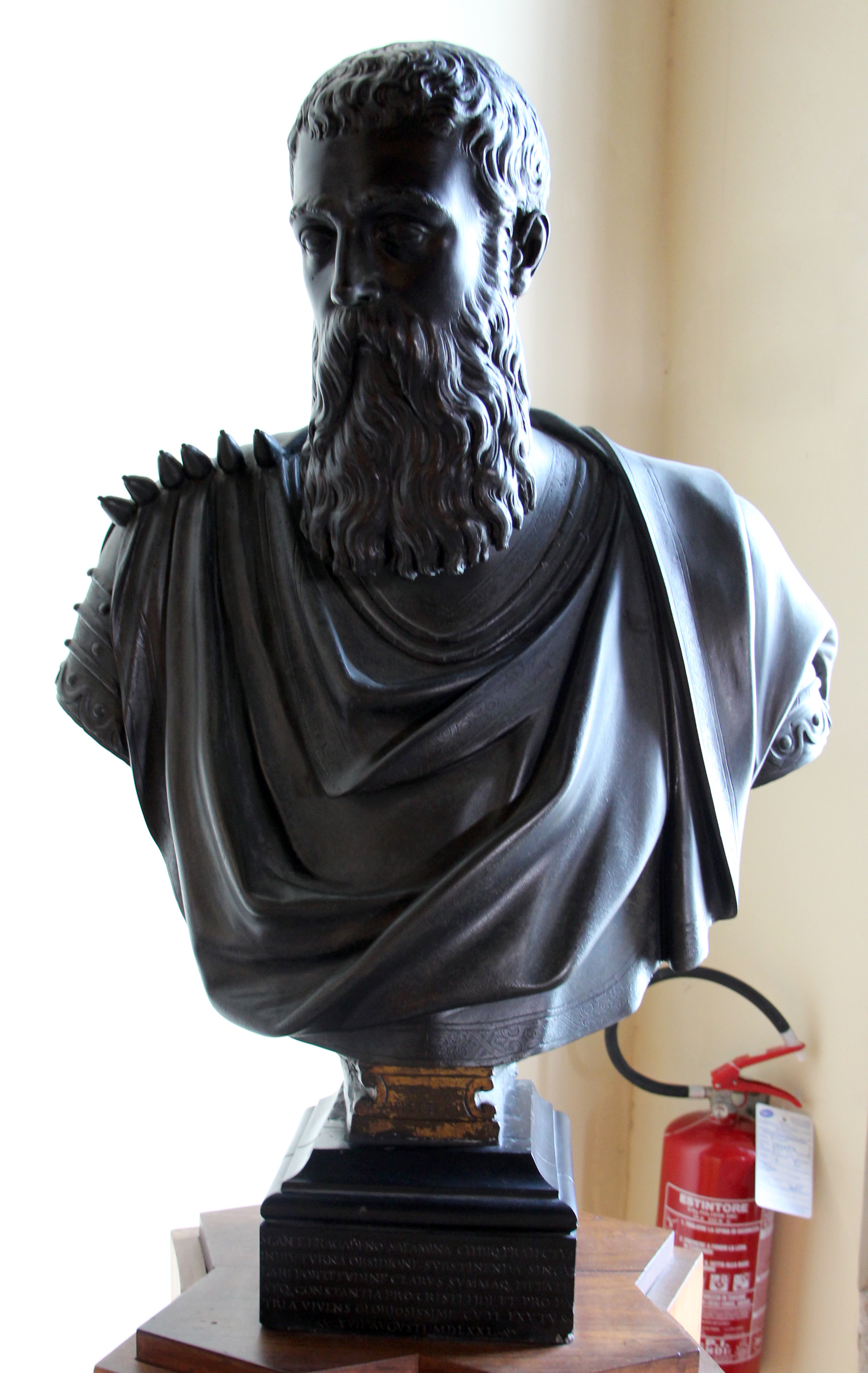
- Tiziano Aspetti, Marcantonio Bragadin (ca. 1571)

Captain-General of Cyprus
- Reign: 1569 – 1 August 1571
- Predecessor: Marcantonio Priuli
- Successor: Position abolished (Lala Mustafa Pasha as Beylerbey of Cyprus)
- Born: 21 April 1523; Venice, Republic of Venice
- Died: 17 August 1571 (aged 48); Famagusta, Cyprus Eyalet, Ottoman Empire
- Spouse: Elisabetta Morosini
- House: Bragadin
- Father: Marco Bragadin
- Mother: Adriana Bembo
- Religion: Roman Catholicism

Marco Antonio Bragadin, also Marcantonio Bragadin (21 April 1523 – 17 August 1571), was a Venetian lawyer and military officer of the Republic of Venice.

Bragadin joined the Fanti da Mar Corps or marines of the Republic of Venice. In 1569, he was appointed Captain-General of Famagusta in Cyprus and led the Venetian resistance in the Ottoman siege of Famagusta during the 1570–71 Ottoman-Venetian war. He was executed by flaying in August 1571 in contravention of negotiated safe passage after the Ottomans took Famagusta, the fall of which signaled the end of Western presence in the Mediterranean island for the next three centuries.

== Early life ==
He was born in Venice. After a short stint as a lawyer in 1543, Bragadin pursued a career in the navy, being entrusted with several posts on the Venetian galleys.

Once back in Venice, Bragadin was pressed into the city's magistrates; in 1560 and later in 1566 he was made a galley governor, without, however, ever actually assuming command of a ship.

== Captain of the Kingdom of Cyprus ==
In 1569 he was elected as Captain of the Kingdom of Cyprus and moved to Famagusta, then a rich port, where he assumed civil governorship over the whole island, well aware that a decisive clash with the Ottoman fleet was imminent.

Bragadin worked hard to fortify Famagusta thoroughly; the introduction of gunpowder meant that scientifically planned fortifications with solid walls were needed. So the harbour was endowed with strong defenses, such as the Martinengo bastion, an excellent example of modern fortification granting easy defense on both sides of its walls.

The Turks landed in Cyprus on 3 July 1570. Nicosia fell after a two-month siege. The severed head of the locumtenens regni ("viceroy"), Niccolò Dandolo, was sent to Bragadin, who, undaunted, prepared for the enemy assault.

== The siege of Famagusta ==
Famagusta came under siege on 17 September 1570.

Marcantonio Bragadin led the defence of Famagusta with Lorenzo Tiepolo, Captain of Paphos, and General Astorre Baglioni.

The Ottoman forces kept pressure on Famagusta for months, while artillery relentlessly pounded the city's bulwarks. According to Venetian chroniclers, about 6,000 garrison troops stood against some 100,000 Turks with 1,500 cannons, backed by about 150 ships enforcing a naval blockade to stave off reinforcements and resupply efforts.

The besieged garrison of Famagusta put up a heroic struggle lasting well beyond the most optimistic assumptions, against far superior enemy numbers and without any hope of help from the motherland. Furthermore, the Turks were employing new tactics. The entire belt of walls surrounding the town and the exterior plain was filled with earth up to the top of the fortifications. In the meantime a number of tunnels were dug out towards and under the city walls to undermine and breach them.

In July 1571 the Turks eventually breached the fortifications and their forces broke into the citadel, being repulsed only at the cost of heavy losses. With provisions and ammunition running out, and no sign of relief from Venice on 1 August, Bragadin asked for terms of surrender.

== Death and legacy ==
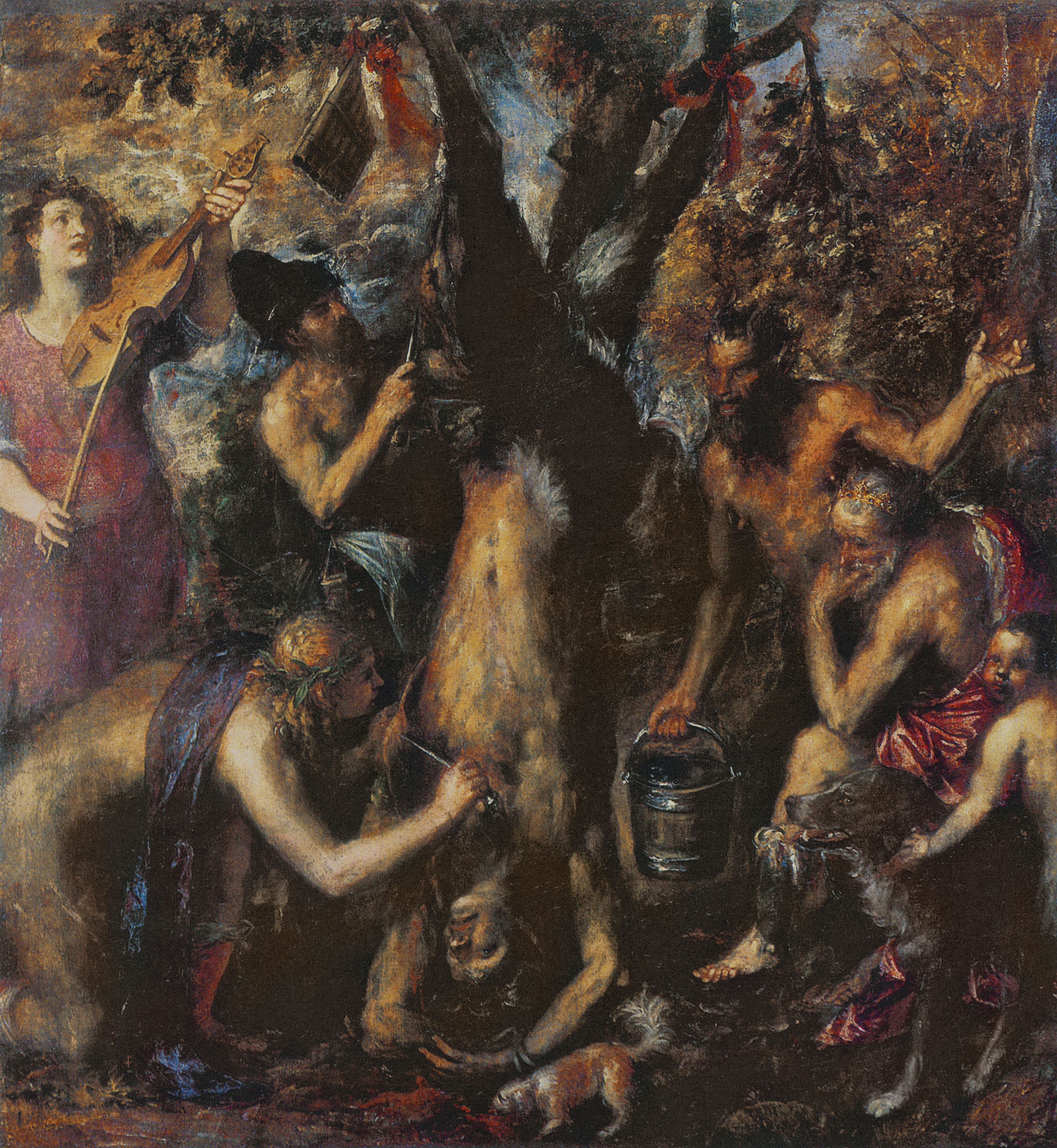
1570–1576 Titian's Flaying of Marsyas. Some researchers such as Helen Lessore speculate that Bragadin's flaying provided the inspiration for this painting.

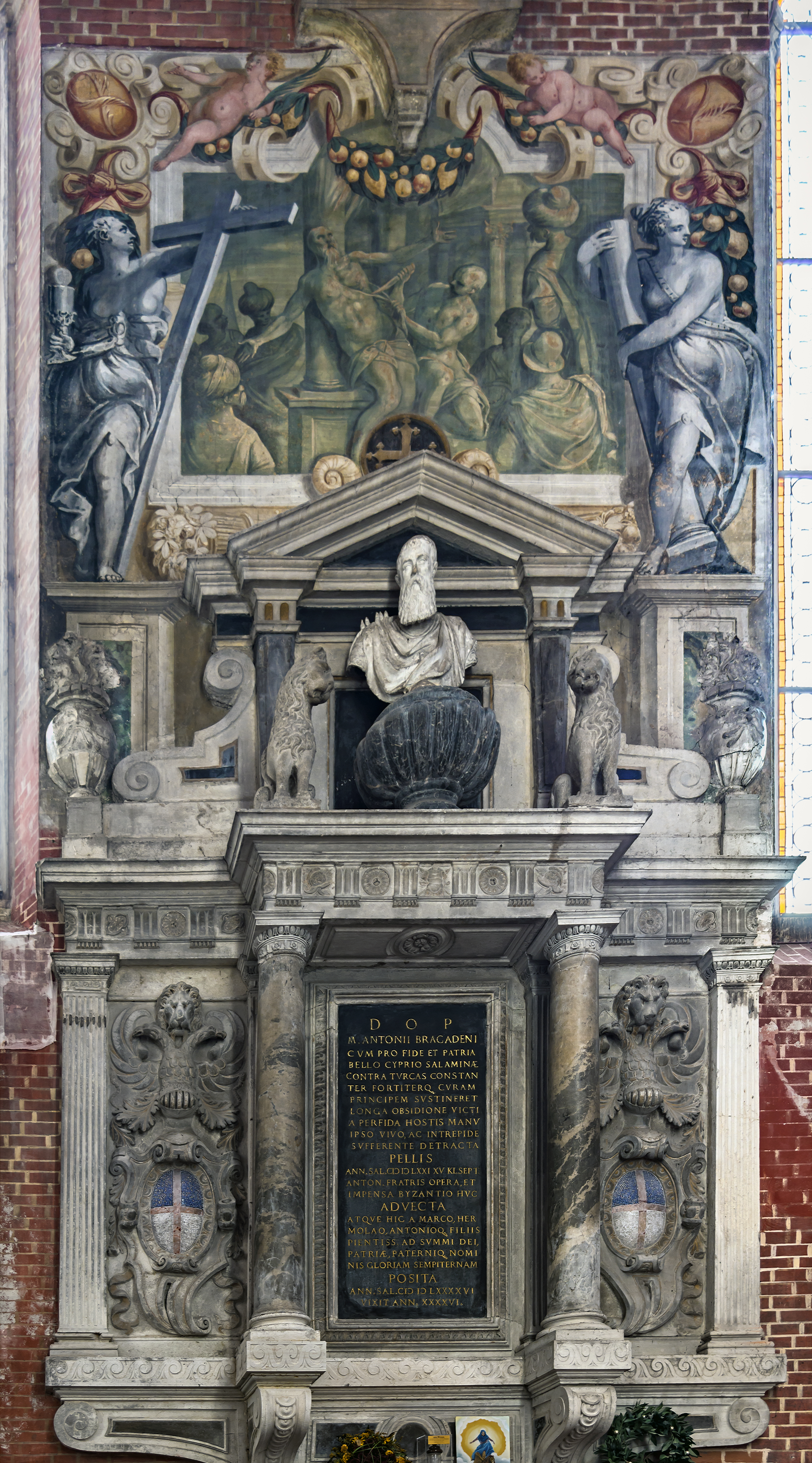
Tomb in San Zanipolo

Famagusta's defenders made terms with the Ottomans before the city was taken by force, since the traditional laws of war allowed for negotiation before the city's defenses were successfully breached, whereas after a city fell by storm all lives and property in the city would be forfeit. The Ottoman commander agreed that, in return for the city's surrender, all Westerners in the city could exit under their own flag and be guaranteed safe passage to Venice-held Crete; Greeks could leave immediately, or wait two years to decide whether to remain in Famagusta under Ottoman rule, or depart the city for any destination of their choice. For the next four days, evacuation proceeded smoothly. Then, at the surrender ceremony on 5 August where Bragadin offered the vacated city to Mustafa, the Ottoman general accused him of murdering Turkish prisoners and hiding munitions. Suddenly, Mustafa pulled a knife and cut off Bragadin's right ear, then ordered his guards to cut off the other ear and his nose.

There followed a massacre of all Christians still in the city, with Bragadin himself most brutally abused. After being left in prison for two weeks, his earlier wounds festering, he was dragged round the walls with "sacks of earth and stone" on his back; next, he was tied to a chair and hoisted to the yardarm of the Turkish flagship, where he was exposed to the taunts of the sailors. Finally, he was taken to his place of execution in the main square, tied naked to a column, and flayed alive. Bragadin's quartered body was then distributed as a war trophy among the army, and his skin was stuffed with straw and sewn, reinvested with his military insignia, and exhibited riding an ox in a mocking procession along the streets of Famagusta.

Bragadin's skin was later stolen from Constantinople's arsenal in 1580 by the young Venetian seaman Girolamo Polidori. He brought it back to Venice, where it was received as a returning hero. The skin was preserved first in the church of San Gregorio, then interred with full honors in the Basilica di San Giovanni e Paolo, where it still is.

Bragadin's fame rests upon the incredible resistance that he made against the vastly superior besieging forces. From a military point of view, the besieged garrison's perseverance required a massive effort by the Ottoman Turks, who were so heavily committed that they were unable to redeploy in time when the Holy League built up the fleet that was later victorious against the Muslim power at Lepanto. Historians to this day debate just why Venice did not send help to Bragadin from Souda, Crete. It is alleged that some Venetians thought about putting their limited military assets to better use in the forthcoming clash, already in sight, which would climax in the Battle of Lepanto.

== Bibliography ==
- Bicheno, Hugh. Crescent and Cross: The Battle of Lepanto 1571. Phoenix, London, 2003. ISBN 1-84212-753-5
- Crowley, Roger. "Empires of the Sea: The Siege of Malta, the Battle of Lepanto, and the Contest for the center of the World." Random House: New York, NY. 2008. ISBN 978-0-571-23231-4
- Foglietta, U. The Sieges of Nicosia and Famagusta. London: Waterlow, 1903.
- Hopkins, T. C. F., "Confrontation at Lepanto – Christendom vs. Islam"
- Madden, Thomas F (2012). Venice: A New History (Hardback). New York: Viking. ISBN 978-0-670-02542-8.
- Monello, G. "Accadde a Famagosta, l'assedio turco ad una fortezza veneziana ed il suo sconvolgente finale", Cagliari, Scepsi e Mattana, 2006.
- Norwich, John Julius (1982). A History of Venice. New York: Vintage Books. ISBN 0-679-72197-5.
