= Begell House =

Academic publisher

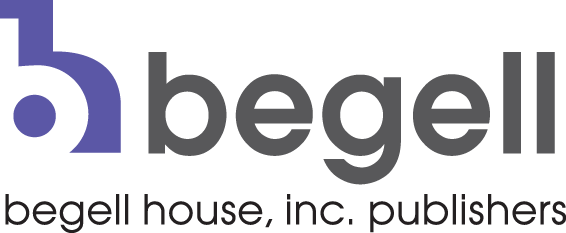
- Status: Active
- Founded: 1991; 35 years ago
- Founder: William Begell
- Country of origin: United States
- Headquarters location: Danbury, Connecticut
- Distribution: Worldwide
- Key people: Yelena Shafeyeva, President
- Publication types: Academic books and journals
- Nonfiction topics: Engineering and biomedical sciences
- Official website: Begell House Homepage

Begell House is an academic publisher of medical and scientific journals and books, with a concentration on engineering and biomedical sciences. The publisher is also producing eBooks and digital articles via "Begell Digital Library" and "Thermopedia".

It was founded in 1991 by William Begell. The company is privately owned. It headquarters are in Danbury, Connecticut. It is a member of the International Association of Scientific, Technical, and Medical Publishers (STM).

== Journals ==
It currently publishes 48 peer-reviewed journals and about 10 new books annually. All journals are peer-reviewed for academic and professional communities. Begell House's entire collection of 38 e-journals are archived and preserved electronically by Portico.

All journal titles are included in Journal Citation Reports. Begell House Journals are indexed by major indexing and abstracting services, including ISI Thompson Science Citation Index, CAS, SCOPUS, PubMed, CrossRef, and others.
