= Agios Konstantinos, Laconia =

Agios Konstantinos Άγιος Κωνσταντίνος
- Community
- Location within Greece
- Coordinates: 37°13′12″N 22°16′59″E
- Country: Greece
- Administrative region: Peloponnese
- Regional unit: Laconia
- Municipality: Sparta
- Municipal unit: Pellana

Population (2021)
  - Community: 71
- Time zone: UTC+2 (EET)
  - Summer (DST): UTC+3 (EEST)

Agios Konstantinos (Greek: Άγιος Κωνσταντίνος, before 1930: Ραγκόξαινα or Ρεγκόζενα - Ragkoxaina or Regkozena) is a village and community in the municipal unit of Pellana, Laconia, Greece.
