= Index Copernicus =

Online database

Index Copernicus (IC) is an online database of user-contributed information, including profiles of scientists, scientific institutions, publications and projects. It was established in 1999 in Poland, and is operated by Index Copernicus International. The database, named after Nicolaus Copernicus (who triggered the Copernican Revolution), has several assessment tools to track the impact of scientific works and publications, individual scientists, or research institutions. In addition to the productivity aspects, IC also offers the traditional abstracting and indexing of scientific publications.

== Origins ==
The Index Copernicus aimed to offer an alternative to the English language dominance of publication indexing systems. The enterprise was co-financed by the European Regional Development Fund under the name: "Electronic Publishing House of Scientific Journals system of Index Copernicus Ltd."

== Controversy ==
IC's journal ranking system was criticized in 2013 by Jeffrey Beall because of the alleged high proportion of predatory journals included in it and its suspect evaluation methodology; he characterized the resulting "IC Value" as "a pretty worthless measure". Index Copernicus remains on the list of misleading metrics.

Index Copernicus has been repeatedly accused of unethical practices.

At the time of partnership between Index Copernicus and the Polish Ministry of Science and Higher Education in the project of evaluating Polish universities, Index Copernicus was offering a paid option to speed up the process of indexing journals which in turn was beneficial in the official process of university evaluation that it was overseeing at the same time.

Some university libraries advise to "avoid journals displaying metrics from Index Copernicus". Index Copernicus has also become the object of study in context of scientific predatory practices. One researcher that stings predatory publishers by publishing fictitious papers (accepted without review by the publishers) says that journals that show the Index Copernicus on their web site are most likely predatory.

== See also ==
- List of academic databases and search engines
