= Nicosia aqueduct =

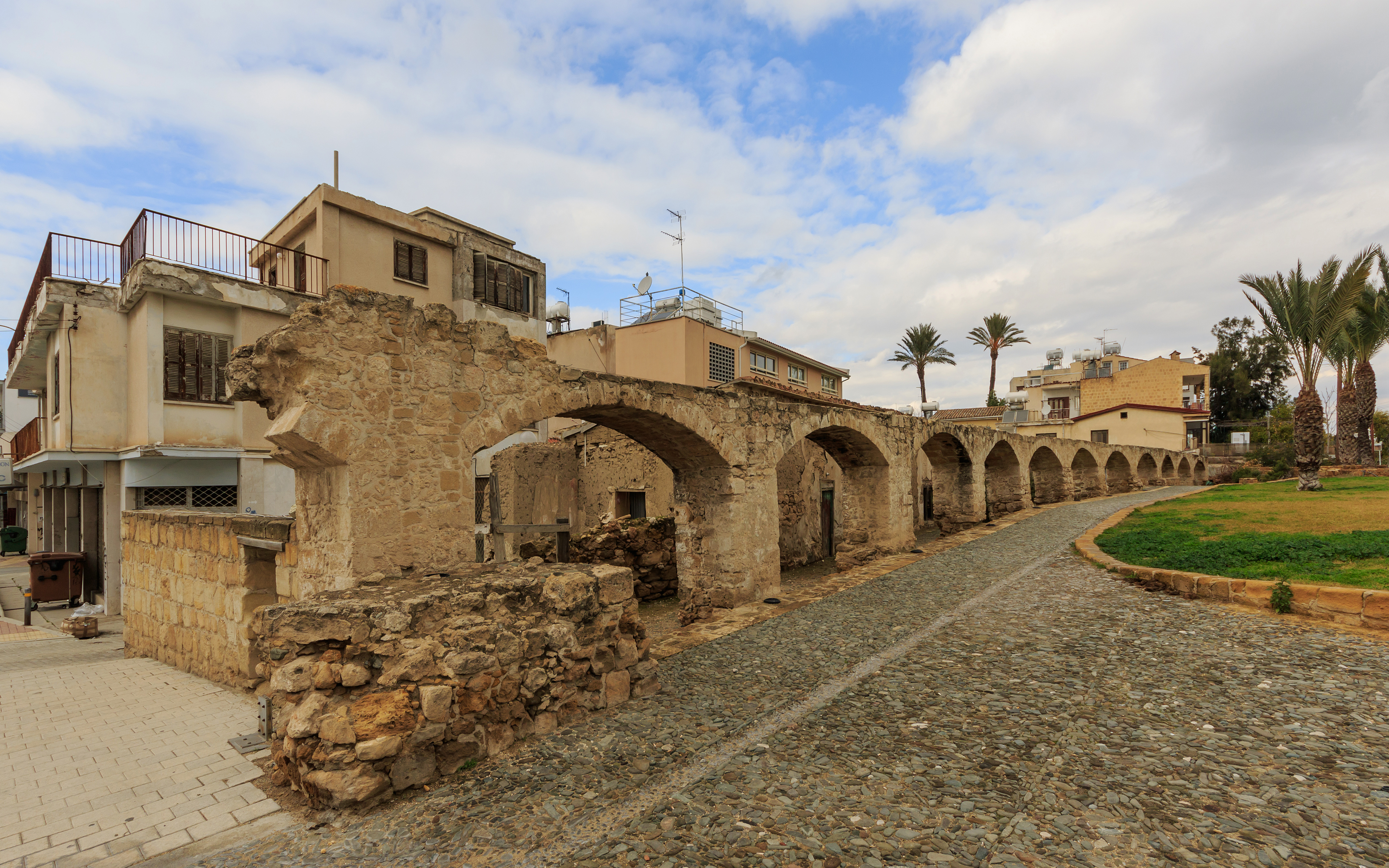
- Coordinates: 35°10′20″N 33°22′12″E
- Carries: Aqueduct to Nicosia
- Locale: Nicosia, Cyprus
- Official name: Υδραγωγείο Λευκωσίας

Characteristics
- Material: Stone, brick

History
- Construction end: 18th century

Nicosia old aqueduct is located in Nicosia, the capital of Cyprus and is the oldest aqueduct in Cyprus. It is located close to the Liberty Monument in Nicosia.

== History ==
=== Ottoman period ===
Built in the 18th century, the ancient Aqueduct was part of the old water supply system of Nicosia which brought water from the mountains north of the city. A stone-built arched construction, it ran from Kyrenia Gate in the north, to Famagusta Gate in the east, and supplied water to several fountains in the inner quarters of the city. This section of the aqueduct was known as the Silihtar Aqueduct, after the Ottoman governor of the time. During the demolition of a private building, eleven arches of this old aqueduct were revealed, hidden within the structure of an adjoining newer construction. The arches showed signs of extensive decay.

=== 19th century ===
A Nicosia Master Plan project was implemented, which included the restoration of the monument and the redesign of the surrounding area encompassing irrigation and drainage systems and the improvement of walkways and passages in the vicinity.

== Gallery ==
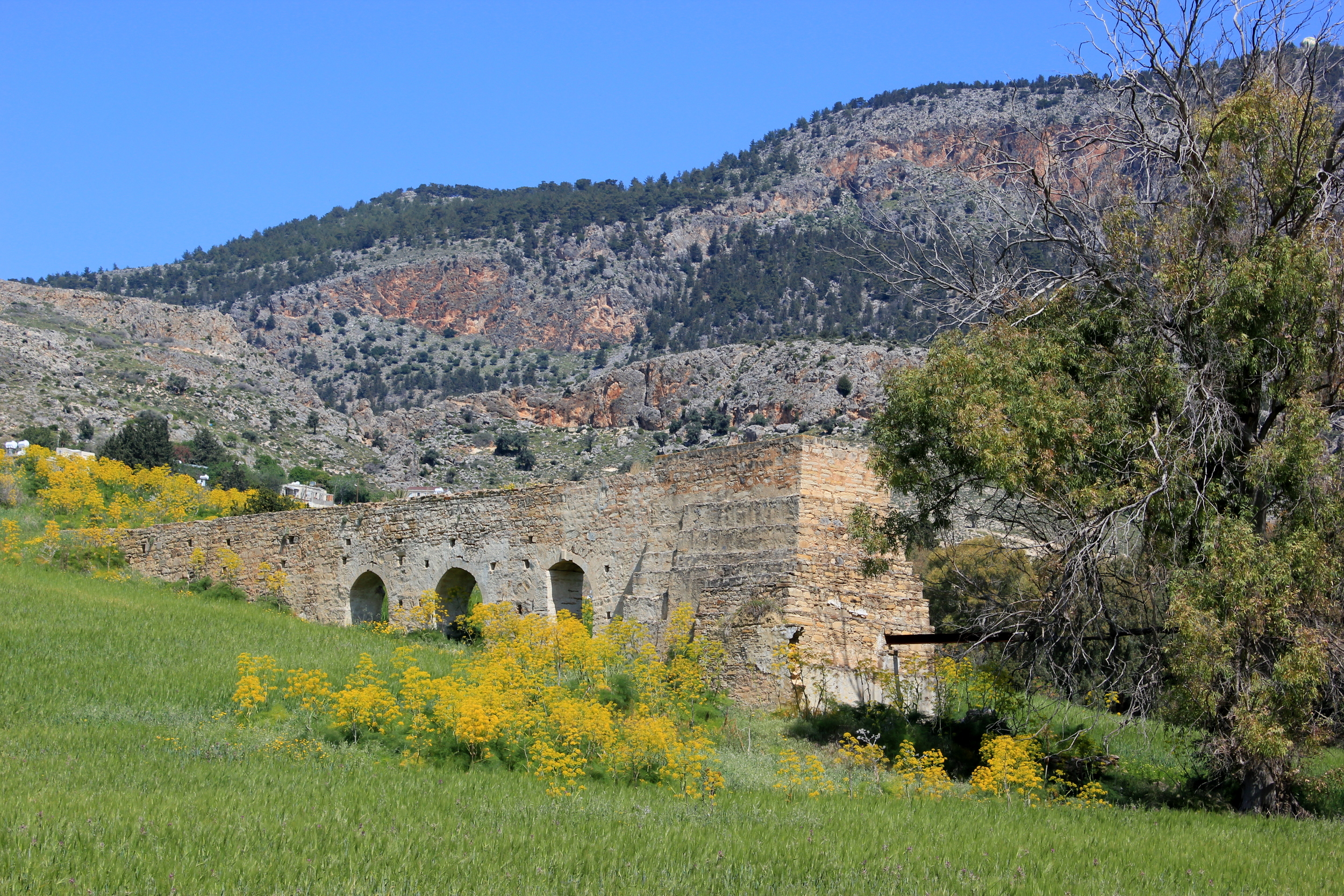
Beginning of the aqueduct near Krini
