= Markets in Nicosia =

Famous market town of Nicosia

Nicosia, the capital of Cyprus, remained primarily a market town into the 20th century. As such, it had numerous markets, which constituted the centres of economic activity through its history.

== Ottoman era ==
In the Ottoman era, the bazaars of Nicosia occupied a network of narrow streets. In 1873, Louis Salvator recorded 23 bazaars scattered in the walled city, with 18 of them being located in the network of streets between the Famagusta Gate and Paphos Gate. As usual with towns in the Ottoman Empire, the city's bazaars dominated its social life and were the focus of its industrial production.
