= Venetian Cyprus =

Period of Cypriot history (1489–1571) as a colony of the Republic of Venice

Kingdom of Cyprus Cipro (Italian) Sipro (Venetian) Κύπρος (Greek) Kýprou
- 1489–1571
- Coat of arms

- Great coat of arms

- Status: Colony of the Republic of Venice; Tributary state of the Mamluk Sultanate (1489–1517); Tributary state of the Ottoman Empire (1517–1570)
- Capital: Nicosia
- Captain General
  - 1570–1571: Marco Antonio Bragadin
- History
  - Established: 1489
  - Disestablished: 1571
Preceded by	Succeeded by
Kingdom of Cyprus	Ottoman Cyprus
- Today part of: Cyprus; Northern Cyprus; Akrotiri and Dhekelia

The island of Cyprus was an overseas possession of the Venetians from 1489, when the independent Kingdom of Cyprus became a Venetian protectorate. Cyprus technically remained a kingdom, with its old nobility, but the king's title was transferred to the Doge of Venice. That was until 1571, when the island was conquered by the Ottoman Empire.

== History ==
=== Acquisition ===
Venice had sought control of Cyprus for centuries, and Venetian merchants were active on the island beginning around 1000 AD, when Venetian commercial and military expansion in the eastern Mediterranean began.

The Venetian desire for Cyprus was inspired mainly by profit. The Venetians saw Cyprus primarily as a military base. Anticipating conflict, they undertook an ambitious plan of fortification. Famagusta and Nicosia were ringed with massive earthworks, cased with stone. An outer wall was erected around Kyrenia castle, the gap being filled with earth to form an artillery rampart. The best military architects in Europe were brought in to design and execute these projects.

In 1460, James II of Cyprus of the House of Lusignan became King of Cyprus. In 1468, he chose Catherine Cornaro (born in Venice from the noble Cornaro family) as his wife and queen consort. This choice pleased the Republic of Venice, as it could henceforth secure Venice's commercial rights and other privileges in Cyprus. They married by proxy in Venice on July 30, 1468, when Catherine was 14 years old.

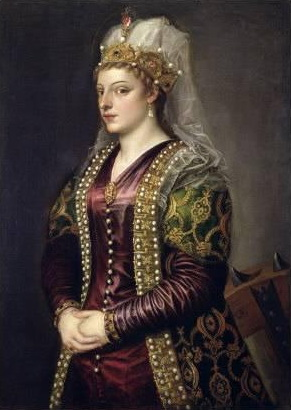
Portrait of Venetian Catherine Cornaro, the last medieval "Queen of Cyprus", by Titian

James died shortly after the wedding from a sudden illness, and, according to his will, Catherine, who was pregnant at the time, acted as regent. She became monarch upon the death of their infant son James from malaria in August 1474, before his first birthday.

The Kingdom of Cyprus had long been in decline and had been a tributary of the Egyptian Mamluks since 1426. Under Catherine, who ruled Cyprus from 1474 to 1489, the island was controlled by Venetian merchants, and on March 14, 1489, she was forced to abdicate and cede the administration of the country to the Republic of Venice.

According to George Boustronios, "On 14 February, the Queen dressed in black and accompanied by the Barons and their ladies, set off on horseback. Six knights held her horse's reins. From the moment she left Nicosia, her eyes kept streaming with tears. Upon her departure, the whole population was bewailing." As compensation, Catherine was allowed to retain the title of queen and was made the Sovereign Lady of Asolo, a county in the Venetian terraferma in northern Italy, in 1489.

Venetian Cyprus was composed primarily of Greek Orthodox peasants, who were oppressed by the Latin ruling class (related to the former Lusignan kings). It was estimated to include some fifty thousand serfs. Venice favored Catholicism, leading to an increase in Catholic followers, which caused some friction with the local Greek Orthodox clergy.

=== Contest with the Ottoman Empire ===
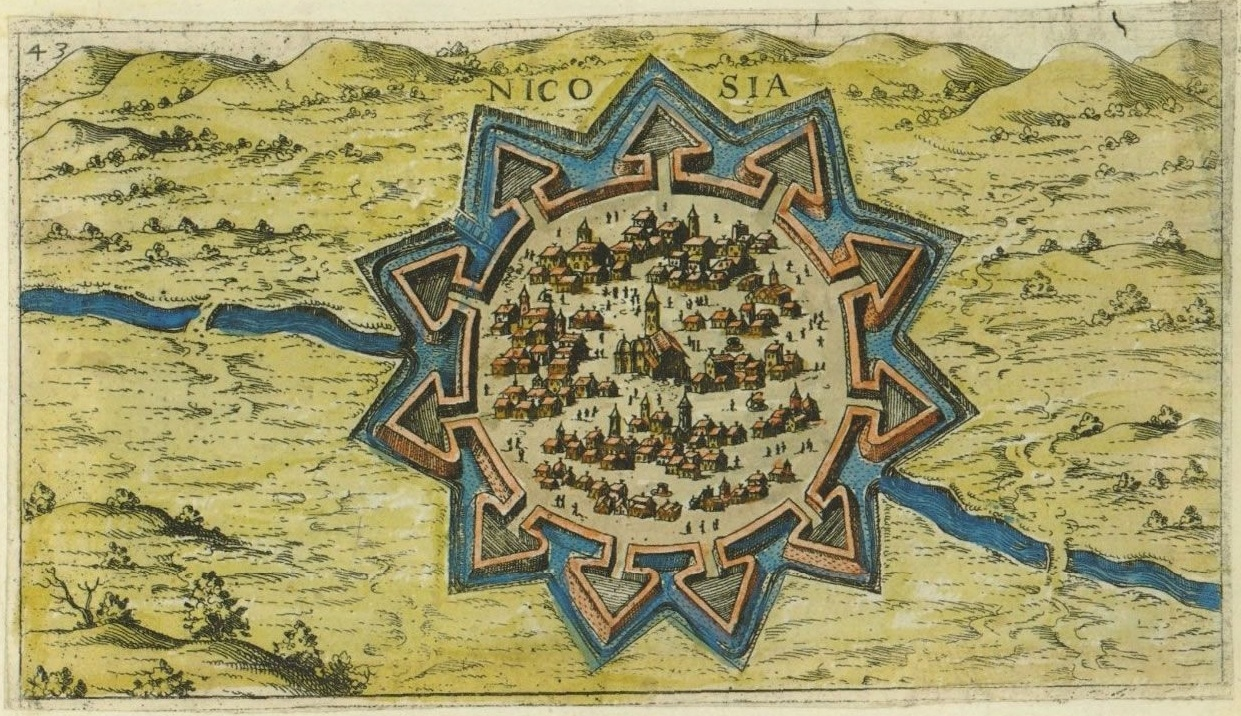
Map of Nicosia in Cyprus, created by the Venetian cartographer Giacomo Franco, showing the Venetian walls of Nicosia that were built by the Venetians to defend the city in case of an Ottoman attack

Throughout the period of Venetian rule, the Ottoman Empire conducted raids and attacks on Cyprus. The Greek population of Cyprus were armed by their Venetian rulers and participated in fighting the attacking Ottomans.

In 1489, the first year of Venetian control, the Ottomans attacked the Karpass Peninsula, pillaging and taking captives into slavery. In 1539, the Ottoman fleet attacked and destroyed Limassol. Fearing the ever-expanding Ottoman Empire, the Venetians had fortified Famagusta, Nicosia, and Kyrenia, but most other cities were easy targets.

When Cyprus came under Venetian rule, Nicosia became their administrative center. The Venetian governors considered the fortification of all Cypriot cities necessary due to the Ottoman threat. In 1567, Venetians built the new fortifications of Nicosia, which are well-preserved today, demolishing the old Frankish walls and other significant Frankish-era buildings, including the King's Palace, private palaces, and churches and monasteries of both Orthodox and Latin Christians. The new walls took the shape of a star with eleven bastions; the bastion design was more suitable for artillery defense and provided better control for the defenders. The walls had three gates: the "Kyrenia Gate" to the north, the "Paphos Gate" to the west, and the "Famagusta Gate" to the east. The river Pedieos flowed through the Venetian walled city, but in 1567, it was diverted outside into the newly built moat for strategic reasons, in anticipation of an Ottoman attack.

The Venetians also modified Kyrenia Castle to counter the threat posed by gunpowder and cannons. The castle's royal quarters and three of its four thin Frankish towers were demolished and replaced by thick circular towers, better able to withstand cannon fire.

Commercial activity under Venetian rule transformed Famagusta into a prosperous city where merchants and ship owners lived in luxury. Inspired by the belief that wealth could be measured by the churches they built, these merchants funded the construction of churches in various styles. These churches, some of which still exist, led Famagusta to be known as "the district of churches". The town's development focused on the social life of the wealthy, centered around the "Lusignan Palace", the cathedral, the square, and the harbour.

In the summer of 1570, the Ottomans launched a full-scale invasion. About 60,000 troops, including cavalry and artillery, under the command of Lala Mustafa Pasha landed unopposed near Limassol on July 2, 1570, and besieged Nicosia. The city fell on September 9, 1570; 20,000 Nicosians were killed, and every church, public building, and palace was looted. News of the massacre spread, and a few days later, Mustafa took Kyrenia without resistance. The Venetian walls of Nicosia were incomplete and ineffective in stopping this powerful Ottoman army, which was reinforced in late 1570.

=== Siege of Famagusta ===
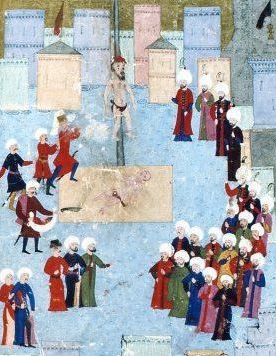
Marco Antonio Bragadin, Venetian Captain-General of Famagusta, was gruesomely killed in August 1571 after the Ottomans took the city.

Famagusta, strengthened by the governor of Cyprus, Astorre Baglioni, mounted a strong defense that lasted from September 1570 until August 1571.

On 15 September 1570, the Ottoman cavalry appeared before Famagusta, the last Venetian stronghold in Cyprus. By this point, overall Venetian losses (including the local population) were estimated by contemporaries at 56,000 killed or taken prisoner. The defenders of Famagusta numbered about 8,500 men with 90 artillery pieces and were commanded by Marco Antonio Bragadin. They held out for 11 months against a force eventually numbering over 200,000 men, with 145 guns, allowing the Pope time to assemble an anti-Ottoman league from reluctant Christian European states.

The Ottomans lost some 52,000 men in five major assaults by early 1571. In July 1571, the Ottomans breached the fortifications and broke into the citadel, being repulsed only with heavy losses. With provisions and ammunition running low, his soldiers capable of fighting reduced to just seven hundred, and no sign of relief from Venice, on August 1 Bragadin requested terms of surrender. The Ottoman commander, Lala Mustafa Pasha, agreed to allow the survivors to safely return to Crete, but did not keep his word, reportedly enraged by the death of his older son while attacking the few Venetian defenders. A massacre of all Christians remaining in the city followed, with Bragadin being brutally abused.

From a military standpoint, the besieged garrison's perseverance required a massive effort by the Ottomans, who were so heavily committed that they were unable to redeploy their forces in time when the Holy League assembled the fleet that would later be victorious against the Ottoman fleet at the Battle of Lepanto (1571). Theodore Mommsen wrote that this perseverance was the legacy of Bragadin and his Venetians to Christianity. Historians continue to debate why Venice did not send aid to Bragadin from Souda, Crete. It is alleged that some Venetians thought their limited military resources would be better utilized in the anticipated clash that culminated in the Battle of Lepanto.

The fall of Famagusta marked the beginning of the Ottoman period in Cyprus.

== List of governors ==
The year given is the year of appointment.

=== Lieutenants (luogotenenti) ===
- 1489 – Francesco Barbarigo
- 1491 – Girolamo Pesaro
- 1493 – Giovanni Donato
- 1495 – Andrea Barbarigo
- 1497 – Cosimo Pasqualigo
- 1500 – Andrea Venier
- 1501 – Nicola Priuli
- 1503 – Pietro Balbi
- 1505 – Cristoforo Moro
- 1507 – Lorenzo Giustiniani
- 1509 – Nicola Pesaro
- 1511 – Paolo Gradenigo
- 1514 – Donato Marcello
- 1516 – Fantino Michiel
- 1518 – Alvise d'Armer
- 1519 – Sebastiano Moro
- 1522 – Giacomo Badoer
- 1523 – Domenico Capello
- 1525 – Donato di Lezze
- 1527 – Silvestro Minio
- 1529 – Francesco Bragadino
- 1531 – Marcantonio Trevisan
- 1533 – Stefano Tiepolo
- 1535 – Giovanni Moro
- 1536 – Domenico da Mosto
- 1539 – Francesco Badoer
- 1541 – Cristoforo Capello
- 1543 – Luigi Riva
- 1545 – Carlo Capello
- 1547 – Vittorio Barbarigo
- 1548 – Salvatore Michiel
- 1550 – Alessandro Contarini
- 1551 – Francesco Capello
- 1553 – Marco Grimani
- 1555 – Giambattista Donato
- 1557 – Giovanni Renier
- 1559 – Giovanni Barbaro
- 1562 – Pietro Navagero
- 1563 – David Trevisan
- 1565 – Marino Gradenigo (died before arriving in Cyprus)
- 1565 – Pandolfo Guoro
- 1566 – Nicola Querini
- 1566 – Agostino Barbarigo
- 1567 – Nicola Dandolo
- 1569 – Sebastiano Venier
- 1570 – Daniele Barbarigo (never arrived in Cyprus)

=== Counsellors (consiglieri) ===
- 1490 – Francesco Leone
- 1492 – Bartolomeo Minio
- 1493 – Lorenzo Contarini
- 1494 – Ludovico Moro
- 1494 – Roberto Venier
- 1495 – Dona Rimondo
- 1496 – Ambrogio Contarini
- 1497 – Bartolomeo Pesaro
- 1498 – Pietro Moro
- 1500 – Nicola Pisani
- 1501 – Nicola Corner
- 1502 – Nicola Pesaro
- 1503 – Antonio Morosini
- 1504 – Girolamo Marin
- 1505 – Giacomo Badoer
- 1506 – Pietro Basadonna
- 1507 – Ludovico Contarini
- 1507 – Pietro Loredan
- 1508 – Donato di Lezze
- 1508 – Alvise d'Armer
- 1510 – Antonio Bon
- 1510 – Nicola Corner
- 1512 – Moise Leone (died before arriving in Cyprus)
- 1512 – Marino Gritti
- 1513 – Nicola Michiel
- 1514 – Giovanni Dolfin
- 1515 – Sebastiano Badoer
- 1515 – Ludovico Corner
- 1516 – Andrea Pesaro
- 1516 – Francesco Malipiero
- 1519 – Pietro Balbi
- 1521 – Sebastiano Foscarini
- 1522 – Domenico da Mosto
- 1523 – Pietro Venier
- 1524 – Marcantonio Trevisan
- 1526 – Marco Querini
- 1526 – Girolamo Marcello
- 1531 – Secondo Pesaro
- 1531 – Bernardo Venier
- 1533 – Marcantonio Calbo
- 1533 – Marco Balbi
- 1534 – Marcantonio Corner
- 1535 – Francesco Bembo
- 1536 – Sebastiano Querini
- 1537 – Marco Barbo
- 1538 – Antonio Calbo
- 1538 – Giambattista Donato
- 1540 – Michele Tron
- 1541 – Fantino Dolfin
- 1542 – Anzolo Nadal
- 1543 – Bernardo Pesaro
- 1544 – Gaspard Bembo
- 1545 – Gaspard Contarini
- 1546 – Bernardo Marcello
- 1547 – Andrea Contarini
- 1548 – Marco Pesaro
- 1549 – Maffeo Soranzo
- 1549 – Zaccaria Barbaro
- 1551 – Ludovico Ponte
- 1551 – Alessandro Zorzi
- 1553 – Girolamo Navagero
- 1554 – Antonio Zane
- 1555 – Nicola Mula
- 1556 – Ludovico Minotto
- 1557 – Giovanni Bragandino
- 1558 – Ludovico Capello
- 1558 – Lorenzo Pisani
- 1558 – Bernardo Morosini
- 1560 – Bernardino Bellegno
- 1561 – Girolamo Malipiero
- 1562 – Marco Cicogna
- 1563 – Antonio Zorzi (died before arriving in Cyprus)
- 1564 – Benedetto Contarini
- 1564 – Giacomo Ghisi
- 1565 – Nicola Loredan
- 1566 – Benedetto Mula
- 1568 – Pietro Pisani
- 1568 – Marcantonio Priuli

== Bibliography ==
- Birtachas, Stathis, Βενετική Κύπρος (1489–1571): Οι Εκθέσεις των αξιωματούχων του ανώτατου διοικητικού σχήματος της κτήσης / Venetian Cyprus: The Reports by the dominion’s supreme administrative officials, Thessaloniki: Epikentro, 2019. [bilingual edition]
- Birtachas, Stathis, Κοινωνία, πολιτισμός και διακυβέρνηση στο βενετικό Κράτος της Θάλασσας: Το παράδειγμα της Κύπρου [Society, Culture and Government in the Venetian Maritime State: The case of Cyprus], Thessaloniki: Vanias, 2011. [in Greek]
- Borowiec, Andrew (2000). Cyprus: a troubled island. Greenwood Publishing Group. ISBN 978-0-275-96533-4.
- Campolieti, Giuseppe. Caterina Cornaro: regina di Cipro, signora di Asolo Ed. Camunia. Milano, 1987.
- Diehl, Charles. La Repubblica di Venezia. Newton & Compton. Roma, 2004. ISBN 88-541-0022-6
- Foglietta, U. The Sieges of Nicosia and Famagusta. London: Waterlow, 1903.
- Romanin, Samuele. Storia documentata di Venezia, Pietro Naratovich tipografo editore. Venezia, 1853.
