= Neriman Cahit =

Turkish Cypriot poet and author

- Born: 1937; Krini, Cyprus
- Died: 18 May 2025
- Education: Teachers' College
- Occupations: Poet, Author
- Writing career
- Language: Turkish
- Literary movement: Feminism, humanism

Neriman Cahit (1937 - 18 May 2025) is a Turkish Cypriot poet and author. She is known as a leading figure of Turkish Cypriot poetry and a vocal advocate of women's rights.

== Biography ==
Neriman Cahit was born in Krini (known as Kırnı in Turkish at the time) in 1937. The eldest of three sisters, she went to her village's primary school for three years. Her parents, concerned for the education of their daughter, transferred her to the Atatürk Primary School in Nicosia, where she resided for the rest of her life. She started penning her thoughts at the 5th year of primary school.

She went to the Victoria Girls' High School, where she studied classics with the help of her philosophy teacher and became increasingly vocal with her writing. She then went on to study at the Teachers' College, and was forced to transfer to the newly formed Teachers' College of Turkish Cypriots in 1957 due to the nascent intercommunal strife. Her early poetry in this period was more focused on natural and romantic themes; it shifted towards social issues with time. She started writing with a free style, not incorporating rhyme schemes into her poetry.

After her graduation, she was sent to the village of Klavdia for her first duty. She continued teaching for 33 years and often in remote villages, claiming that it was "as if she was exiled because of her opposition". During her career, she was a vocal figure in the Turkish Cypriot Teachers' Union (KTÖS) and defended women's rights, free press and labor unions.

She published her first works in the 1960s under a male pseudonym due to restrictions imposed on her by her family. Some trials were filed against this pseudonym at the time. Observing the state of Turkish Cypriot women in the villages that she worked in, she reflected the conditions they suffered from. Throughout her career as a teacher, her articles, poems, researches and interviews were published in Turkish Cypriot newspapers. She is considered one of the leading advocates of women's rights.

Her first book, K.T.Ö.S. Mücadele Tarihi ("History of KTÖS Struggle") was published in 1987, followed by her first poetry book, Sıkıntıya Vurulan Düğüm in 1988. Her first book entirely focused on women, Konu: Kadın ("Subject: Woman") was published in 1989. Since then, she has released a number of books consisting of her poetry, interviews, research and articles. Some of the topics explored in her work are womanhood in Cyprus, the city of Nicosia and the perception of sexuality in the Turkish Cypriot society. She has expressed her passion for Nicosia, the deep entrenchment of the city in her soul and the pain that the city's division gives to her.

She has been the recipient of at least 15 awards in literature, including awards from the Turkish magazine Nokta, from Humanist International and from the International Organization of Turkic Culture. She is the founder of the Women's Research Center and currently writes periodicals in the Turkish Cypriot daily newspaper Yeni Düzen.
