= Walls of Nicosia =

Series of walls surrounding the old city of Nicosia, Cyprus

- Nicosia, Cyprus
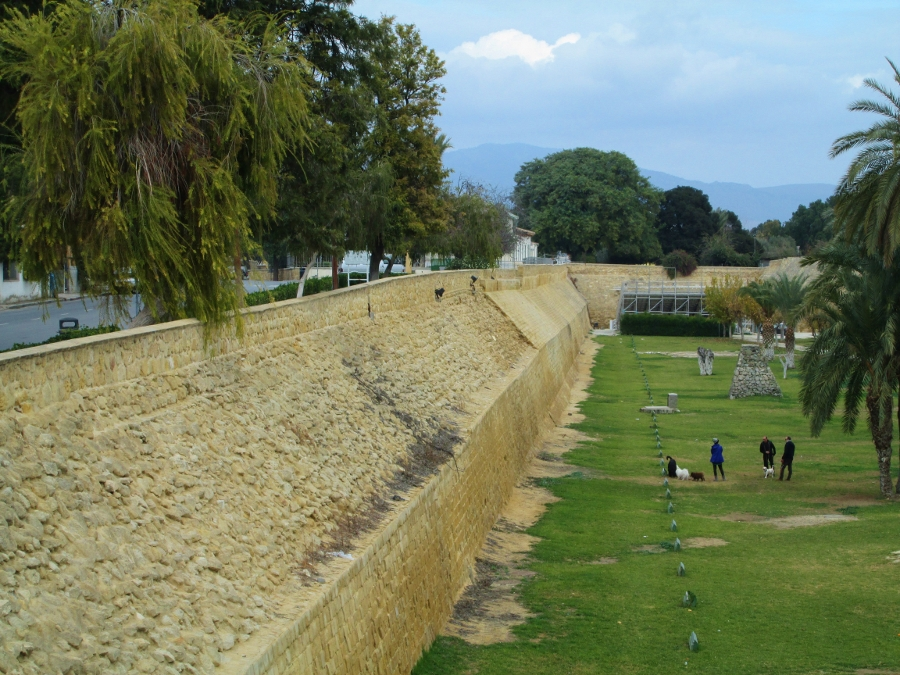
- Part of the Venetian walls

Site information
- Type: City wall and star fort
- Owner: Government of Cyprus (Note: Half of the walls lie in North Nicosia, in the Turkish Republic of Northern Cyprus. Parts of the walls also lie in the United Nations Buffer Zone in Cyprus.)
- Controlled by: Department of Antiquities
- Open to the public: Yes
- Condition: Largely intact
- Architect: Giulio Savorgnan

Location
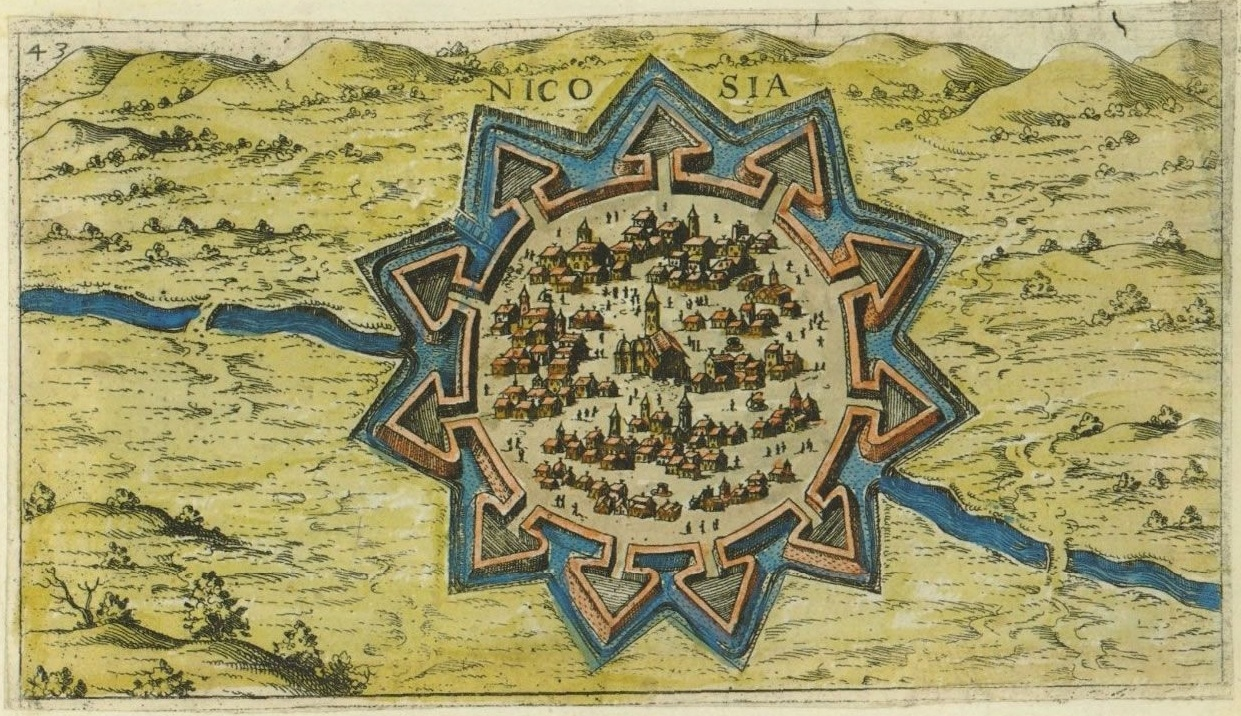
- Map showing Nicosia in 1597
- Coordinates: 35°10′15.8″N 33°22′12.2″E

Site history
- Built: 1567–1570
- Built by: Republic of Venice
- Battles/wars: Ottoman–Venetian War (1570–73)

The Walls of Nicosia, also known as the Venetian Walls, are a series of defensive walls which surround Nicosia, the capital city of Cyprus. The first city walls were built in the Middle Ages, but they were completely rebuilt in the mid-16th century by the Republic of Venice during their war with the Ottoman Empire. The walls are still largely intact, and are among the best preserved Renaissance fortifications in the Eastern Mediterranean. They are a major tourist attraction.

Nicosia, like Palmanova in Italy, and Valletta in Malta, was an example of an ideal city of the Renaissance. This was due to its fortifications and its urban life within the city.

== History ==
The first fortification in Nicosia was a castle built in 1211, during the Lusignan period. A large tower called Margarita Tower was built by King Peter I in 1368. Peter II built the first fortifications surrounding the entire city, and also demolished the Margarita Tower.

Cyprus became part of the Republic of Venice in 1489. Although the Venetian governors of the city emphasized the need for the city to be fortified, initially, nothing was done to improve the fortifications. This changed following the Great Siege of Malta in 1565, when fears of Ottoman expansion increased and many Christian states in the Mediterranean began to strengthen their fortifications.

In 1567, the Venetians decided to fortify the city and commissioned the Italian military engineers Giulio Savorgnan and Francesco Barbaro to design the new fortifications. The medieval fortifications, which engineers had deemed inadequate to defend the city, were demolished to make way for the new walls. The Venetians also demolished several houses, churches and palaces within the city as well as buildings lying outside the new walls, both for the acquisition of building materials and for a clearer field of vision for the defence of the city.

At the same time, the Pedieos was diverted outside the city to protect the residents from flooding and to fill the moat encircling the new walls.

The Fourth Ottoman–Venetian War broke out in 1570, when the fortifications were still incomplete. Ottomans under Piali Pasha invaded Cyprus on 1 July of that year, and began the siege of Nicosia on 22 July. The city held out until 9 September, when the Ottomans breached the wall at Podocattaro Bastion. The Ottomans then killed the defenders and captured the remaining inhabitants.

After the end of the siege, Lala Mustafa Pasha left a garrison of 4000 soldiers and 1000 cavalry in the city. The city then experienced a steady decline. Although the Ottomans repaired the fortifications after the siege, by the early 17th century, they were "breached or decayed" and the city was practically defenceless.

The city eventually began to experience a revival in the mid-19th century. It was still confined within the walls when the British occupied Cyprus in 1878. An opening was made near Paphos Gate in 1879 to facilitate access to the surrounding area. Further openings were made within the walls during the 20th century.

== Layout ==
A map of the walled old city of Nicosia. 10 of the 11 bastions are marked by icons

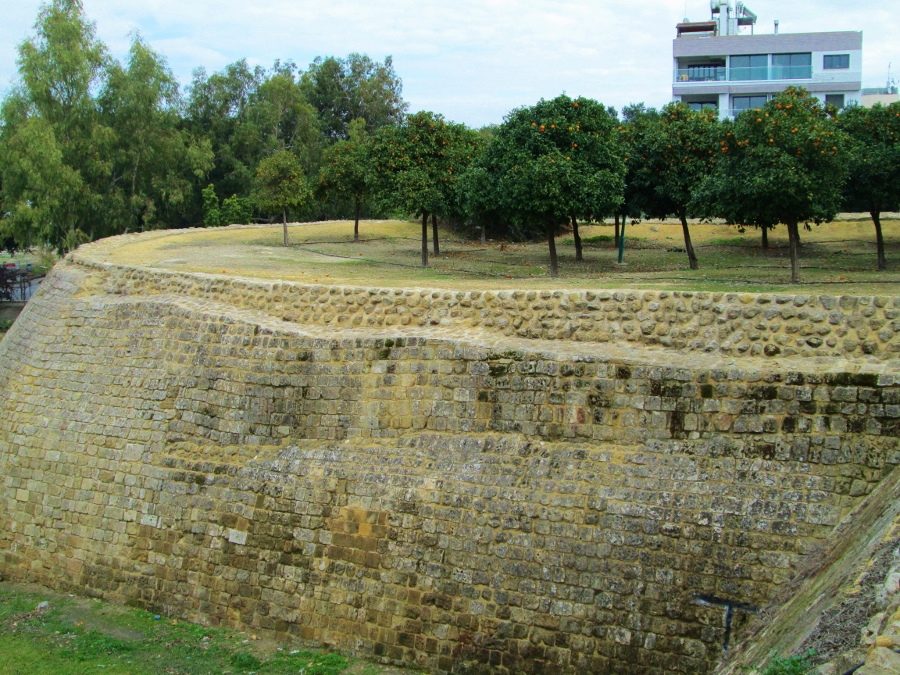
View of part of the Venetian Walls and the nearby gardens

The Venetian walls of Nicosia have a circular shape, with a circumference of c. 5 km (3 miles). The walls contain eleven pentagonal bastions with rounded orillons, similar to the bastions of Palmanova. The bastions are named after eleven families, pillars of the Italian aristocracy of the town, who donated funds towards the construction of the walls. The eleven bastions are:

- Caraffa Bastion
- Podocattaro Bastion
- Constanza Bastion
- D'Avila Bastion
- Tripoli Bastion
- Roccas Bastion
- Mula Bastion
- Quirini Bastion
- Barbaro Bastion
- Loredan Bastion
- Flatro Bastion

Caraffa to Tripoli Bastions lie within the southern half of the city, in the Republic of Cyprus. Roccas to Loredan Bastions lie in the Turkish-occupied north, while Flatro Bastion lies in the UN Buffer Zone.

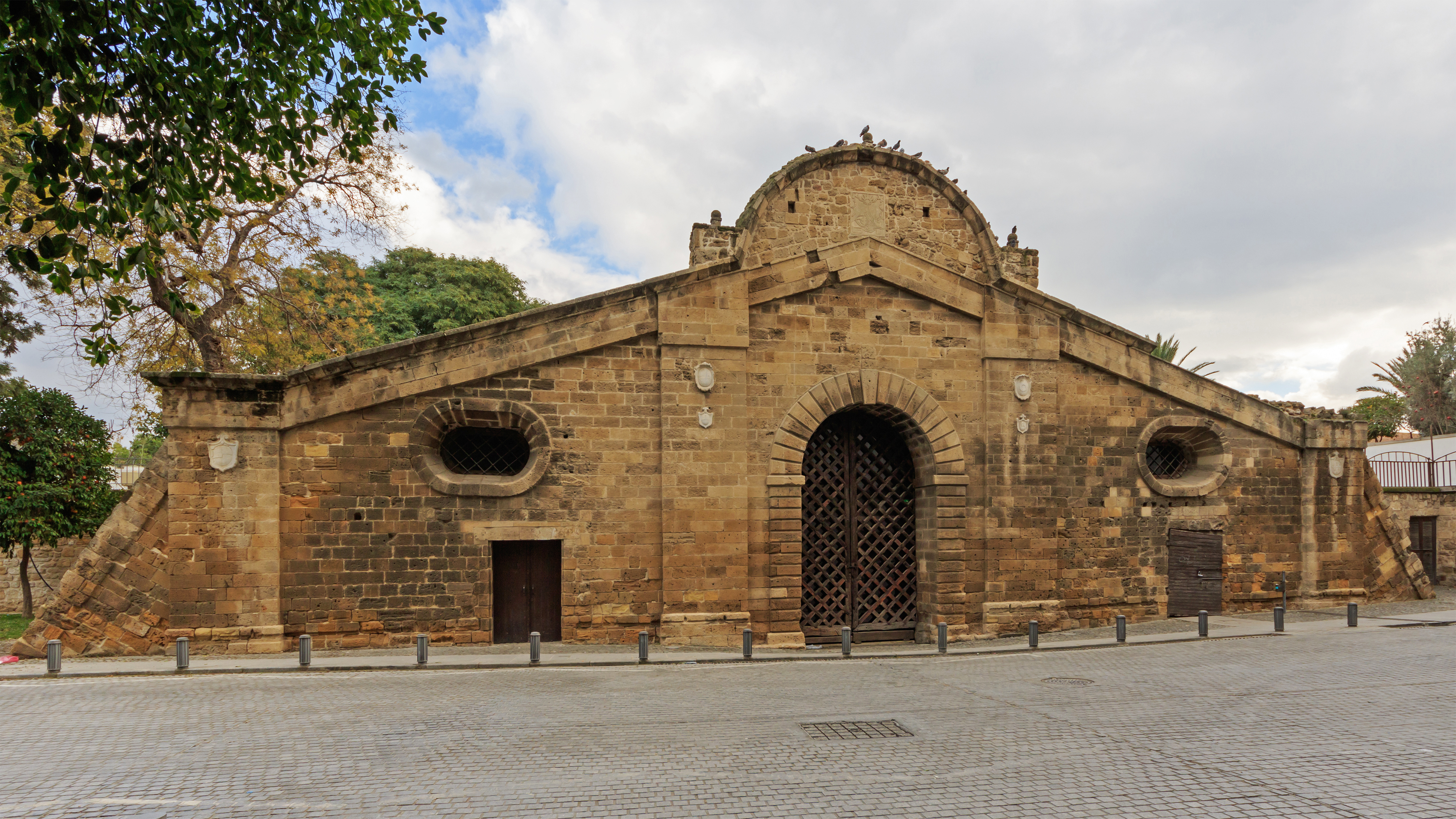
Famagusta Gate.

The city has three gates:

- Paphos Gate (Porta San Domenico)
- Famagusta Gate (Porta Giuliana)
- Kyrenia Gate (Porta del Proveditore)

Although, on the first triangulated survey of Cyprus conducted by Horacio Herbert Kitchener of the British Empire, the opening leading to up to the current Eleftheria Square was noted down as Limassol Gate, despite it not being one of the three original gates of the Walled City.

Experts have considered the walls to be a prime example of 16th century military architecture. Their design incorporates specific innovative techniques, marking the beginning of a renaissance era in fortification construction. These include the positioning of gates to the side of the adjoining bastions, so they could be more easily protected in times of siege, and leaving the upper half of the wall unlined with masonry, to increase its ability to absorb the impact from cannon shot.

Despite this, the fortifications had several shortcomings, mainly since they were still incomplete when they were captured by the Ottomans. The bastions have no piazza-bassa or cavaliers, and the curtain walls are quite low when compared to other contemporary city walls such as the fortifications of Heraklion and the fortifications of Valletta. The fortifications also lacked outworks.

== As a symbol ==
Flag of Nicosia

The flag of Nicosia of Cyprus and the emblem of North Nicosia of Northern Cyprus are based on the layout of the walls.
