= Giacomo Badoer (died 1537) =

Merchant and administrator of the Republic of Venice

Giacomo Badoer or Jacopo Badoer (c. 1457 – 26 December 1537) was a merchant and administrator of the Republic of Venice.

Badoer was born around 1457 to a certain Sebastiano. (Note: He is seemingly not the same person as the Giacomo Badoer who fought the Ottoman Turks on the Isonzo in 1477. This latter Giacomo was the son of Sebastiano Badoer and Cattaruzza Zustignan, married in 1448. A captain of lanze spezzate, he is usually said to have died in the fighting in 1477, based on Marino Sanuto. The Cronaca of Cristoforo Schioppa, however, says merely that he was captured by the Turks along with several other captains: Gian Giacomo Piccinino, Giovanni Antonio Caldera and Ercole Malvezzi.) In 1476, he married Cristina Marcello di Piero. He served in the Venetian navy and as a merchant trading with Constantinople.

In April 1496, Badoer was elected captain of a galley trading with Alexandria. He returned successfully in November. In 1499, he was named to the zonta of the Venetian Senate. In 1500–1501, he served as governor of Monopoli, in which position, Marino Sanuto records, he achieved a certain renown. He was afterwards elected one of the Dieci Savi alle Decime in charge of Venetian finances.

In 1504, Badoer was elected bailo at Constantinople, but he declined in order to become a senator. On 27 October, the Major Council elected him consigliere (counsellor) of Cyprus, a position he held from early 1505 until November 1507. He returned to Venice and the senate in 1508. In June 1509, he was named provveditore of Corfù, but declined on account of ill health. In August 1510, he was named to a special commission of the Dieci Savi.

In 1513, during the War of the League of Cambrai, Badoer was named luogotenente (governor) of the Patria del Friuli. He was responsible for coordinating the defence of the Patria from the Imperial army under Count Krsto Frankopan. On 30 December, Giovanni Vitturi was named provveditore generale with powers superior to Badoer's. On 12 February 1514, the decision was made to abandon Udine, Cividale and Cormons and fall back on Sacile and Osoppo. Badoer and Vitturi went to Sacile. According to Gregorio Amaseo, Badoer was accused of cowardice and treason for this decision. The decision proved strategically correct, however, and Badoer returned to Udine on 31 May. He was back in Venice by 15 October. He laid the blame for Imperial successes on the sympathies of the Friulian populace.

In 1518, Badoer was named to the Council of Ten. In 1521, he was elected to represent Castello in the Minor Council. In 1522, he was named lieutenant of Cyprus. He sat on the Minor Council again in 1525 and 1530. He died on 26 December 1537.

== Works cited ==
- Cracco, Giorgio (1963). "Badoer, Sebastiano". Dizionario Biografico degli Italiani (in Italian). Vol. 5: Bacca–Baratta. Rome: Istituto dell'Enciclopedia Italiana. pp. 142–146. OCLC 883370.
- Thode, Henry (1900). Frangipani's Ring, an Event in the Life of Henry Thode. Translated by J. F. C. L. London: John Mcqueen.
- Varanini, Gian Maria, ed. (2014). Marino Sanudo: Itinerario per la Terraferma veneziana. Rome: Viella.
- Ventura, Angelo (1963). "Badoer, Giacomo". Dizionario Biografico degli Italiani (in Italian). Vol. 5: Bacca–Baratta. Rome: Istituto dell'Enciclopedia Italiana. OCLC 883370.
