= Symbols of Nicosia =

Emblem and flag for the city of Nicosia in Cyprus

The emblem and flag that serve as the symbols of the city of Nicosia, the capital of Cyprus.

== Seal and flag of Nicosia ==
The flag of Nicosia.

The seal of Nicosia.

The emblem and flag of Nicosia were established between 1971, and 1974. Due to the division of the city in the Cyprus dispute between the Republic of Cyprus, and the Turkish Republic of Northern Cyprus, the emblem and the flag are used only in the portion of the city controlled by the Republic of Cyprus.

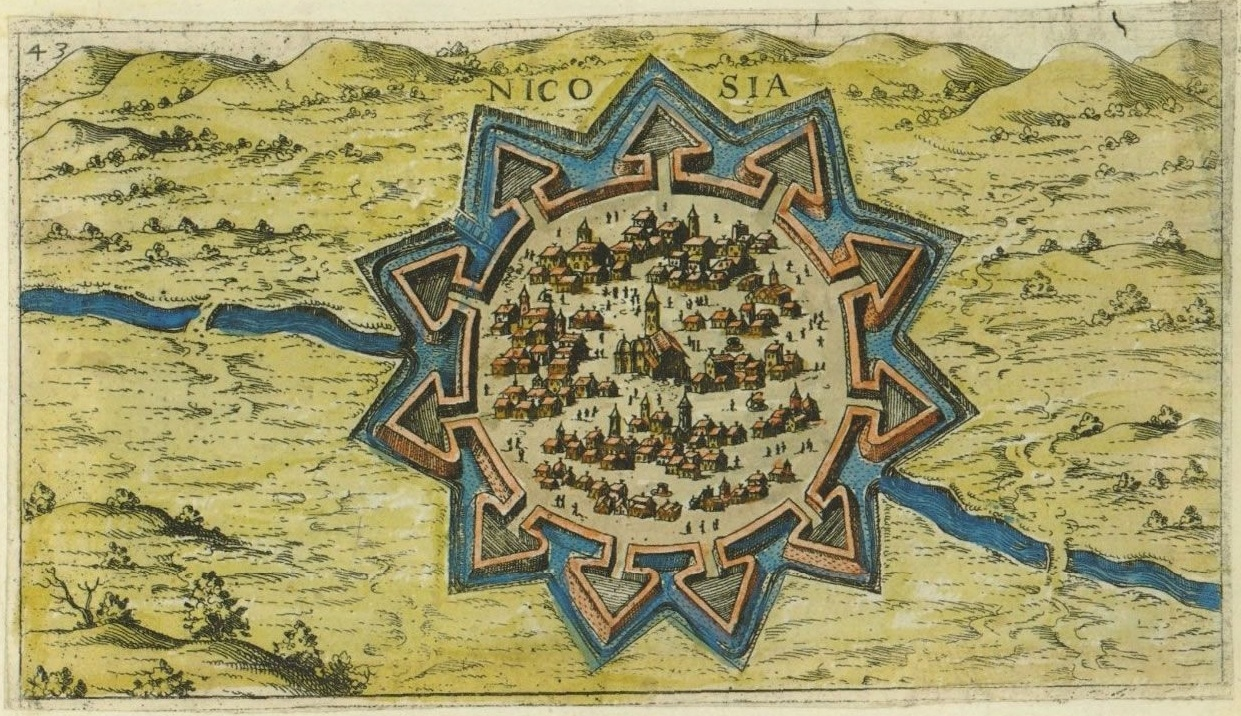
A map of Nicosia in 1597.

The outer portion of the emblem is shaped in the form of curvilineal octagon, with each of its edges curved inwards. It has blue outer boundary. Its inside part is orange, and consists of 8 equally divided fields. The inner portion of the emblem include an orange circle with blue boundary, with 8 arrow-shaped elements. The emblem symbolizes the Walls of Nicosia, a defensive walls which surround Nicosia. Inside the circle is placed a white abstract illustration of a peace dove, that symbolizes the hope for peace in the Cyprus dispute between the Republic of Cyprus, and the Turkish Republic of Northern Cyprus.

The flag of the city depicts its emblem on a white background.

== Symbols of North Nicosia ==
The flag of North Nicosia.

The seal of North Nicosia.

The city of Nicosia had been divided in 1974 in the Turkish invasion of Cyprus, which led to the establishment of the Turkish Republic of Northern Cyprus. The portion of the city under the control of the Northern Cyprus, became known as the North Nicosia. It has its own emblem and flag. They also serve as the symbols of the Nicosia Turkish Municipality.

The emblem of North Nicosia depicts an orange rectangular building with white 3 windows, and a black roof formed from 5 semicircles. It is placed on a white background, within an orange circle with 11 arrow-shaped elements. The emblem symbolizes the Walls of Nicosia, a defensive walls which surround Nicosia. Below the building is written 1958.

The flag of the city depicts its emblem, placed on the right, on the white background. To its left, is placed a Turkish text, that reads Lefkoşa Türk Belediyesi, written in black capital letters. It translates to Nicosia Turkish Municipality.
