= Paphos Gate =

Gate in the Nicosia walls, Cyprus

- Πύλη της Πάφου (Greek); Baf Kapısı (Turkish)
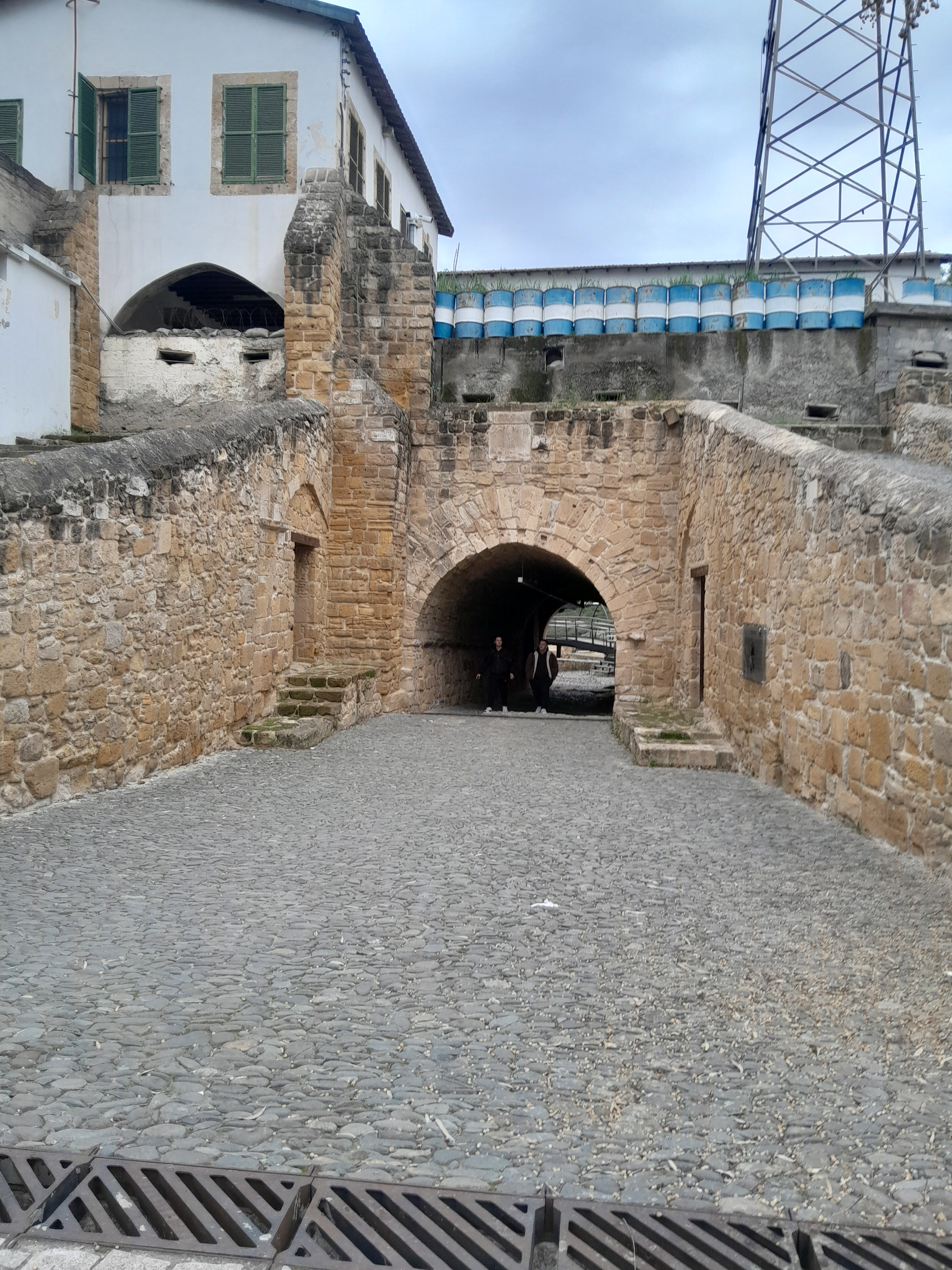
- Paphos Gate viewed from inside the walled city

- Location within Cyprus

General information
- Architectural style: Venetian
- Location: Nicosia, Cyprus
- Coordinates: 35.176821°N 33.357296°E
- Construction started: 1567
- Completed: 1568

Design and construction
- Architect: Giulio Savorgnano

Paphos Gate (Greek: 'Πύλη της Πάφου'; Turkish: Baf Kapısı; Italian: Porta di Paphos), also known as Porta San Domenico (St Dominic Gate), is a gate in the Walls of Nicosia, Cyprus. It was the entrance gate to the city towards the west, specifically Paphos. It probably occupies a site adjacent to the medieval castle and monastery of the Lusignan Kings of Cyprus.

== Description ==
Paphos Gate is at a site 475 ft (145 m) above sea level, which dominates the surrounding lower area and the buildings above the gate were, for this reason, the location of the Ottoman Turkish artillery barracks and residence of the Kaymakam of Nicosia. During British rule they were the Cyprus police headquarters, until 1958, and are still the divisional headquarters.

== History ==
Paphos Gate was designed by the Venetian military engineer Giulio Savorgnano as part of his plan for the Walls of Nicosia. Work commenced in 1567, three years before the Ottoman conquest of the city.

During Ottoman rule, the gate was locked every day after sunset and the keys handed over to the commanding officer of the barracks above the gate. The gate remained closed until dawn the following day. The gate was also closed every Friday for about two hours at midday to enable the soldiers to attend religious service at the mosque. Only Moslems were allowed to enter Nicosia (and other fortified places) on horseback. Non-Moslems, who were called “rayahs”, were obliged to dismount at the gate, but after they entered the city they could continue on horseback. Villagers who came to the city were obliged to leave the city before sunset for security reasons.

In the Congress of Berlin of 1878, Britain negotiated the peaceful acquisition of Cyprus from the Ottoman Empire, for which it paid a tribute and recognised continuing Ottoman Suzerainty. In this circumstances, the British commander Lord John Hay took an expeditionary force to Nicosia and officially took control from the Ottoman forces at the barracks above Paphos Gate on 12th July 1878. The gate and barracks were briefly named Minotaur gate.. after his flagship HMS Minotaur.

The following year, the British administration closed the gate to regular traffic and made a cutting through the Nicosia wall nearby, which greatly eased communication. The north wall of the cutting bears the inscription "VR 1879" (i.e. Victoria Regina).

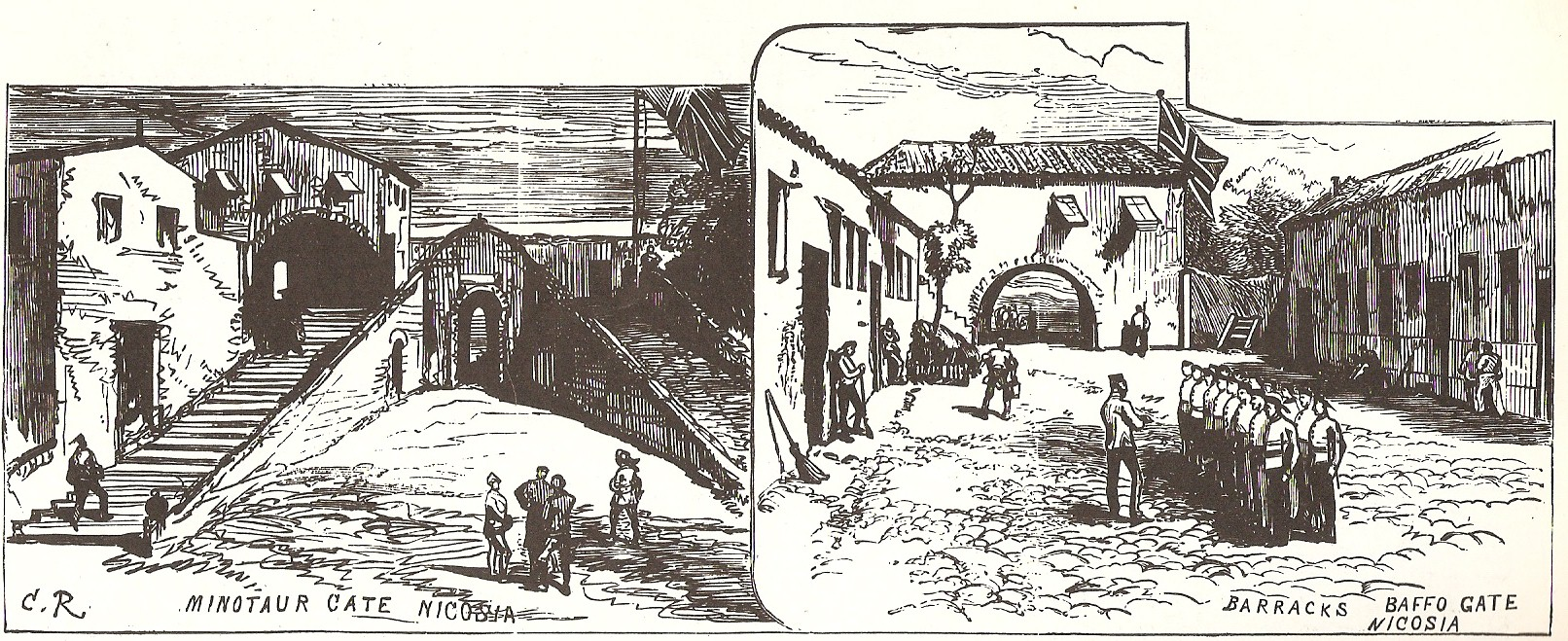
Paphos Gate in 1878

== See also ==
- Kyrenia Gate
- Famagusta Gate
- History of Cyprus
- Venetian Cyprus
