= Krini, Cyprus =

Krini: Κρηνί (Greek); Pınarbaşı (Turkish)
- Village
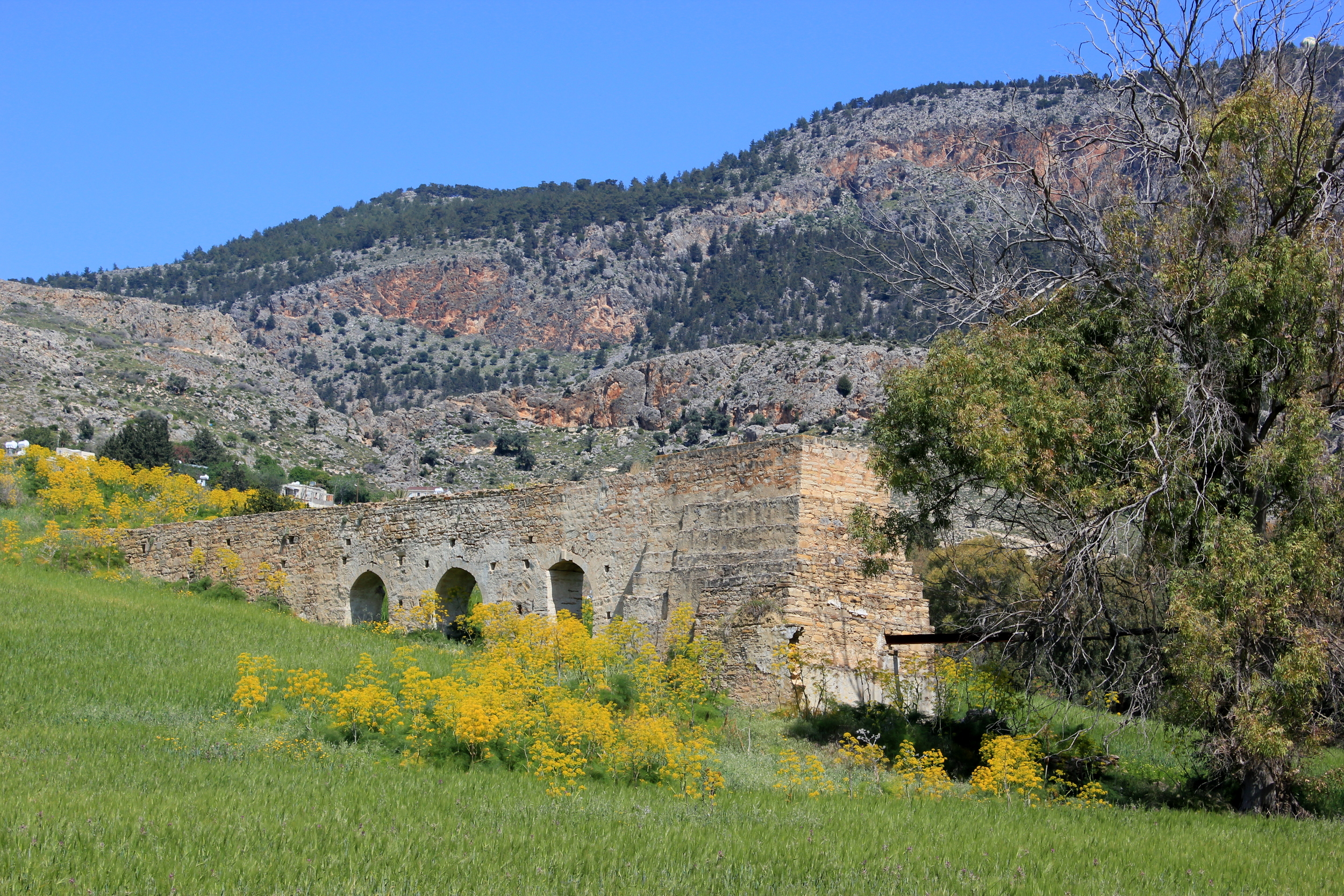
- Beginning of the Nicosia aqueduct near Krini

- Location in Cyprus
- Coordinates: 35°17′15″N 33°14′13″E
- Country (de jure): Cyprus
  - District: Kyrenia District
- Country (de facto): Northern Cyprus
  - District: Girne District

Population (2011)
  - Total: 484
- Time zone: UTC+2 (EET)
  - Summer (DST): UTC+3 (EEST)

Krini (Greek: Κρηνί, Turkish: Pınarbaşı) is a village in the Kyrenia District of Cyprus. It is under the de facto control of Northern Cyprus.

Krini is the starting point of the Nicosia aqueduct.
