= Famagusta Gate =

Gate in the Nicosia walls, Cyprus

Coordinates: 35.1743°N 33.3712°E

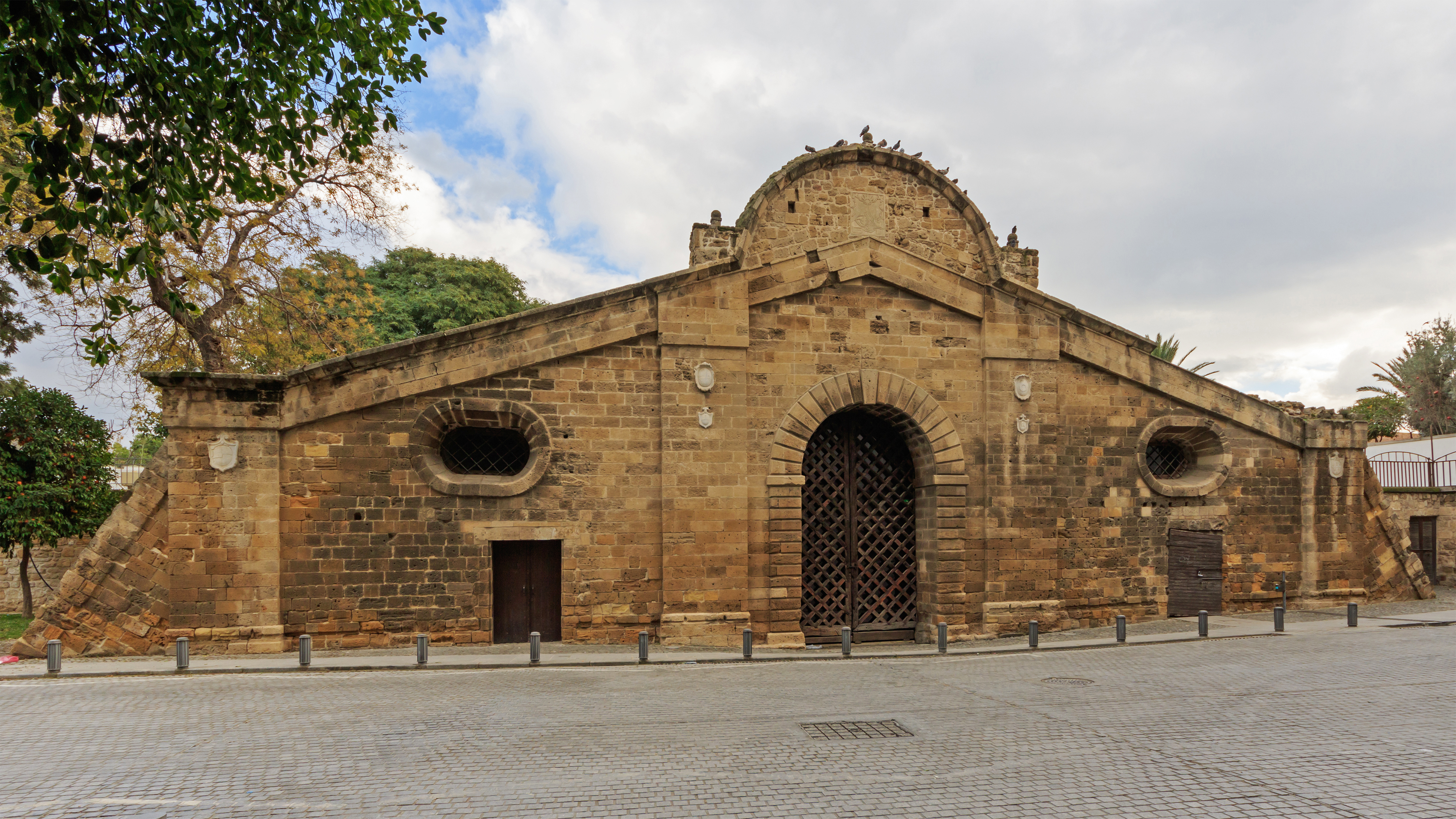
The Famagusta Gate

The Famagusta Gate (Greek: Πύλη της Αμμοχώστου, Turkish: Mağusa Kapısı) is a gate in the Nicosia walls, Cyprus. It is the chief gate of the city: the Porta Giuliana, or "di sotto" of Fra Stefano Lusignano's " Chorograffia", known as Famagusta Gate in modern times. This construction, in the Venetian style has been copied from the famous Lazaretto Gate of Candia designed by Michael Sammicheli at the beginning of the 16th century, and consists of a vaulted passage through the earthwork rampart of the city with a carefully executed spherical dome, eleven metres (36') in diameter, in its centre. The passageway is large enough for two vehicles to pass, and it is lighted by a circular opening in the centre of the dome in the style of the Pantheon, Rome. On either side of this passage appear to be entrances into chambers now blocked up. The external doorway of the Porta Giuliana is a small archway in the re-entering angle or "orecchione" of the Caraffa bastion now somewhat injured by breakage of the arch stones, and the ancient doors, etc., are missing. On the inner side of the gateway, facing the town, is an imposing facade.

== History ==
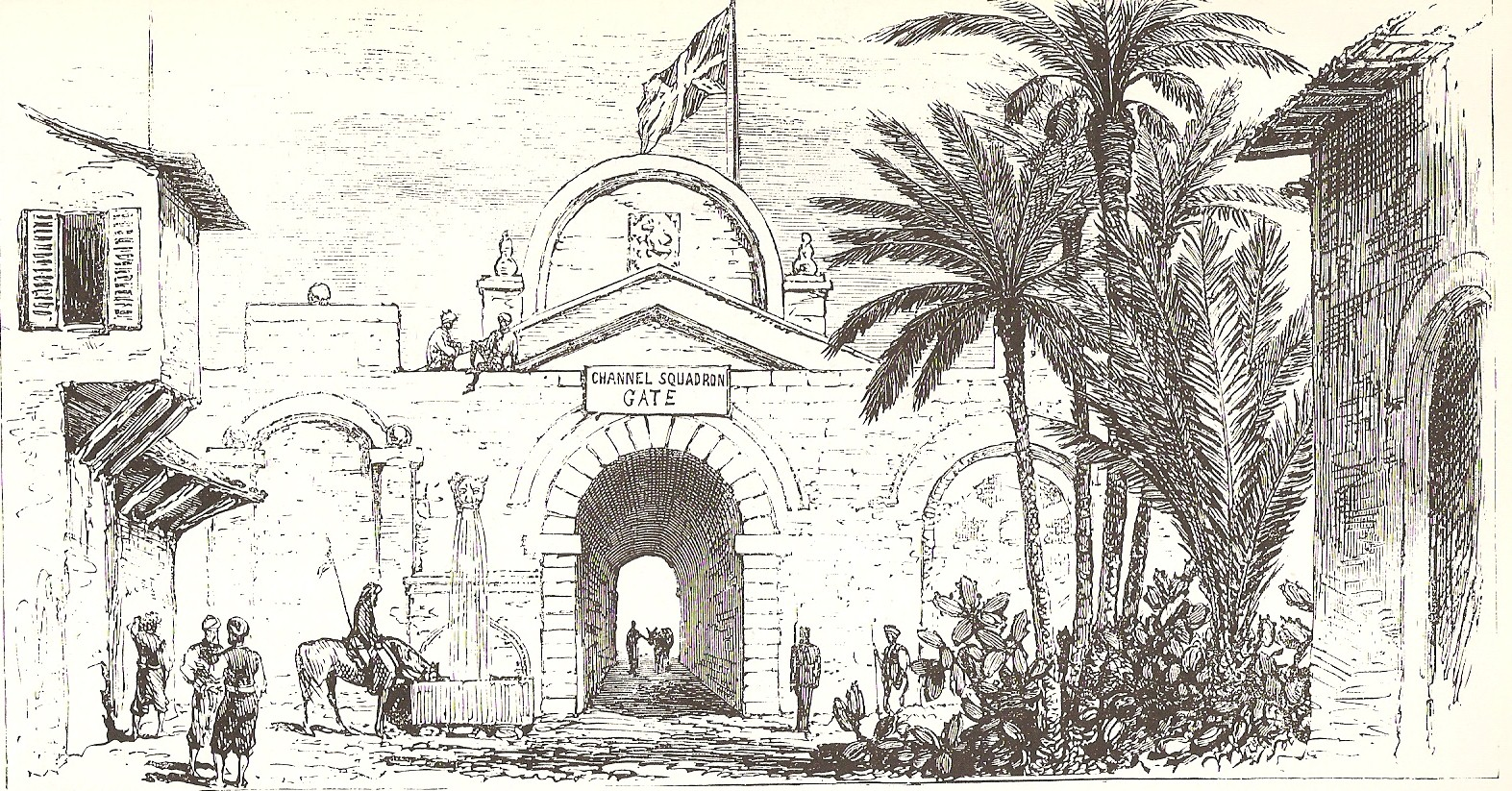
Inner side of Famagusta Gate in Nicosia in 1878

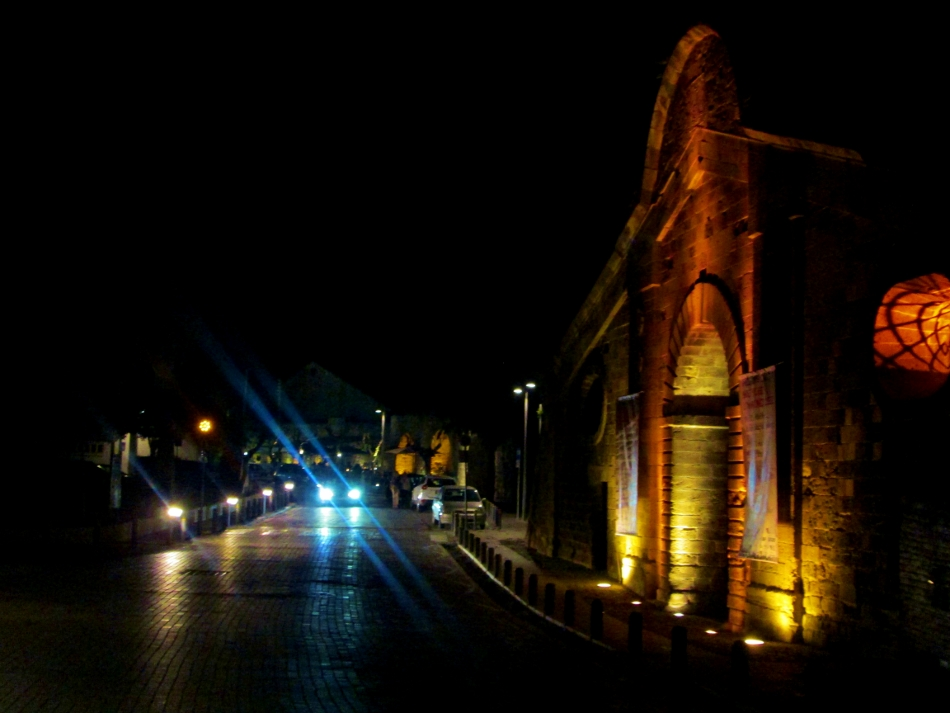
Famagusta Gate by night

The gate was built in 1567 by Venetians, as a part of the new city walls and was originally called the Porta Giuliani after its designer. It was restored by the Ottomans in 1821, and a lookout was added to the gate for a probable Greek revolt.

During British Colonial times the spacious rooms of the gate served as a warehouse for fuel and other materials. Even though a gradual process of preservation was carried out from 1934 to 1981, humidity problems prevailed, and the Gate fell into disuse.

In 1980, the Nicosia Municipality decided to restore the gate and re-use it as a cultural centre. The entrance floor was covered with a cement bed and the area in front of the gate was covered with cobblestones. The internal walls and the roof were cleaned and then insulated. Air conditioning and ventilation systems were installed under floor. The rooms were provided with general lighting and special lighting for the exhibits. The passageway and two side rooms can operate as a whole, or as three individual areas.

Restoration was completed in 1981, and since then the Famagusta gate has become a busy venue for exhibitions helping regenerate Taht-el-kale, Nicosia. Following a flood in 2018, the venue closed down for extensive restoration which is yet to be completed.

== Gallery ==
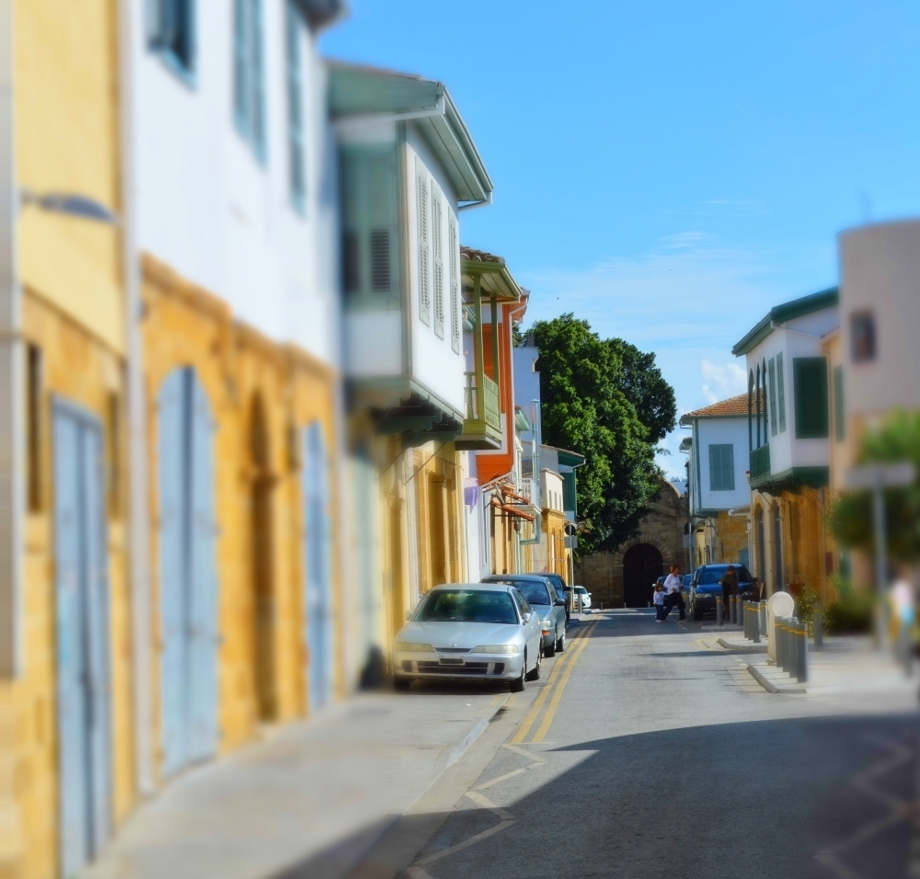
Taht-el-kale neighbourhood and Famagusta Gate

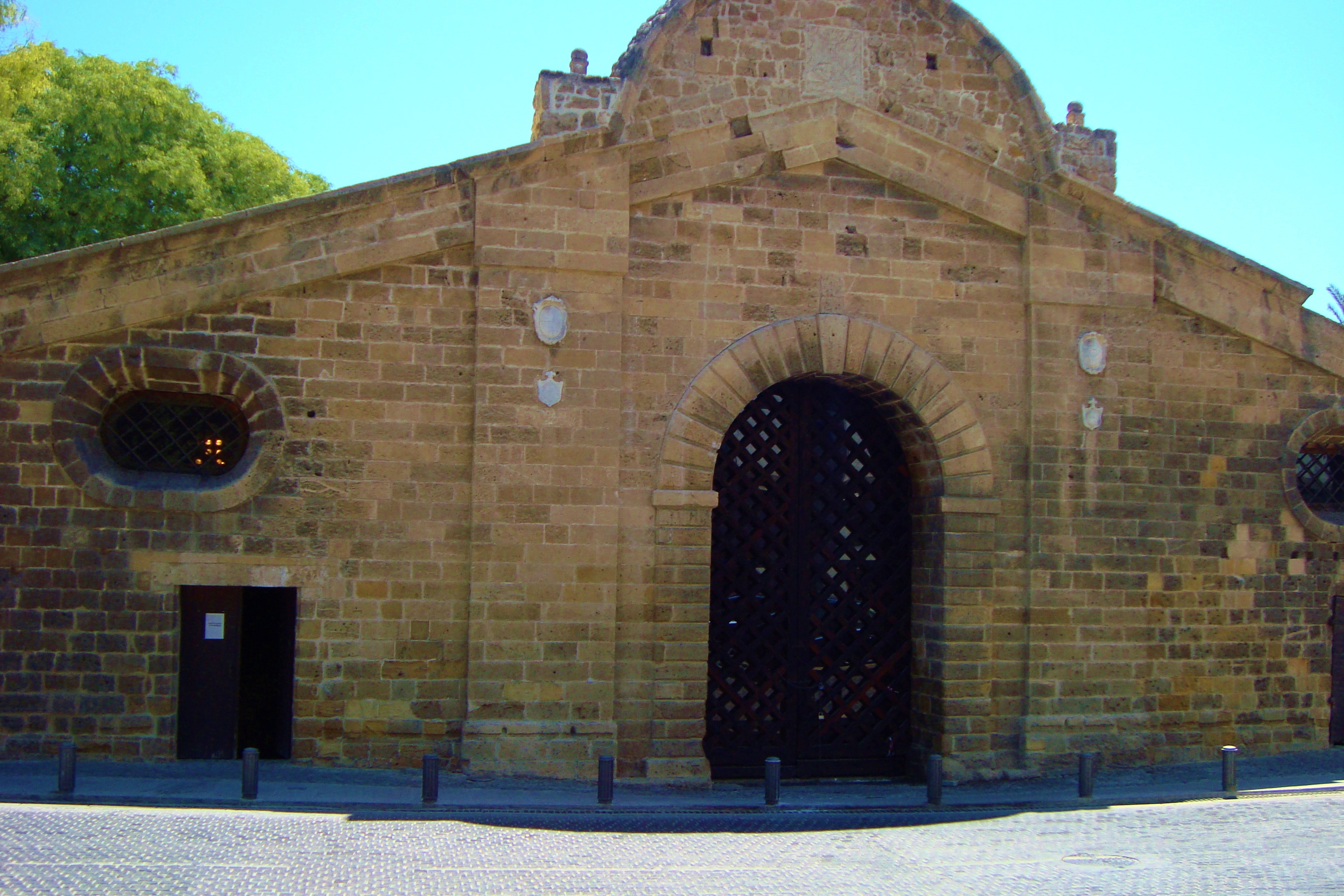
Famagusta Gate exterior

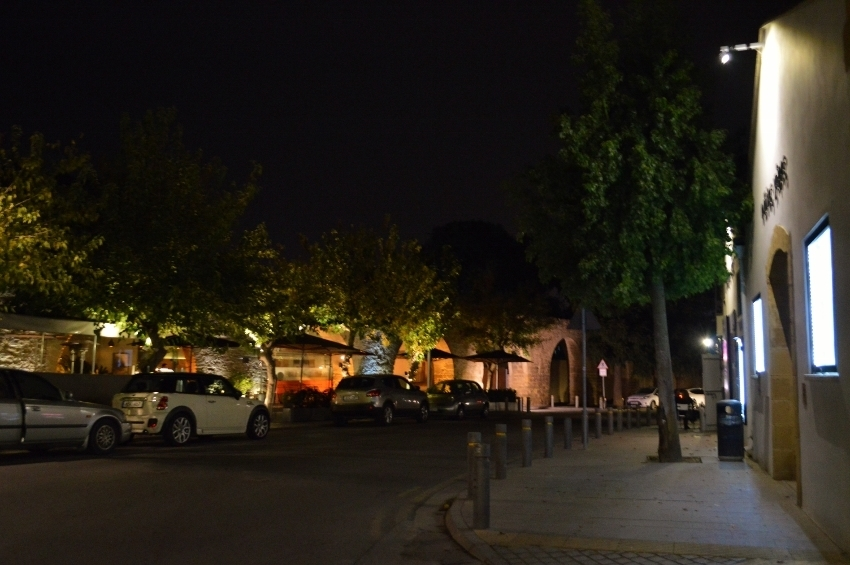
Lounge bars next to the gate

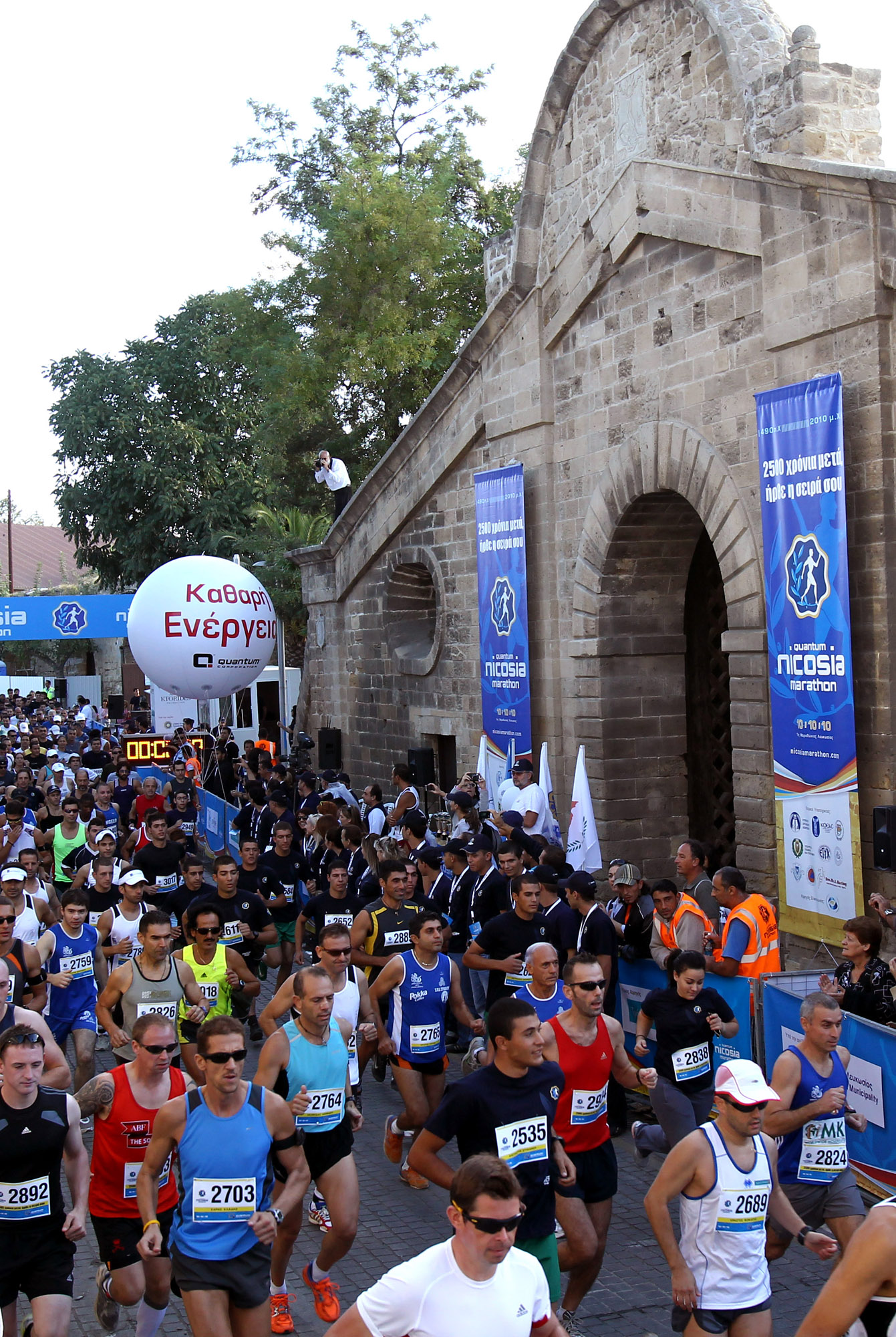
Famagusta gate as starting place of Nicosia Marathon

== See also ==
- Kyrenia Gate
- Paphos Gate
- History of Cyprus
- Venetian Cyprus
