= Kyrenia Gate =

Gate in the Nicosia walls, in North Nicosia, Northern Cyprus

Coordinates: 35°10′53″N 33°21′42″E

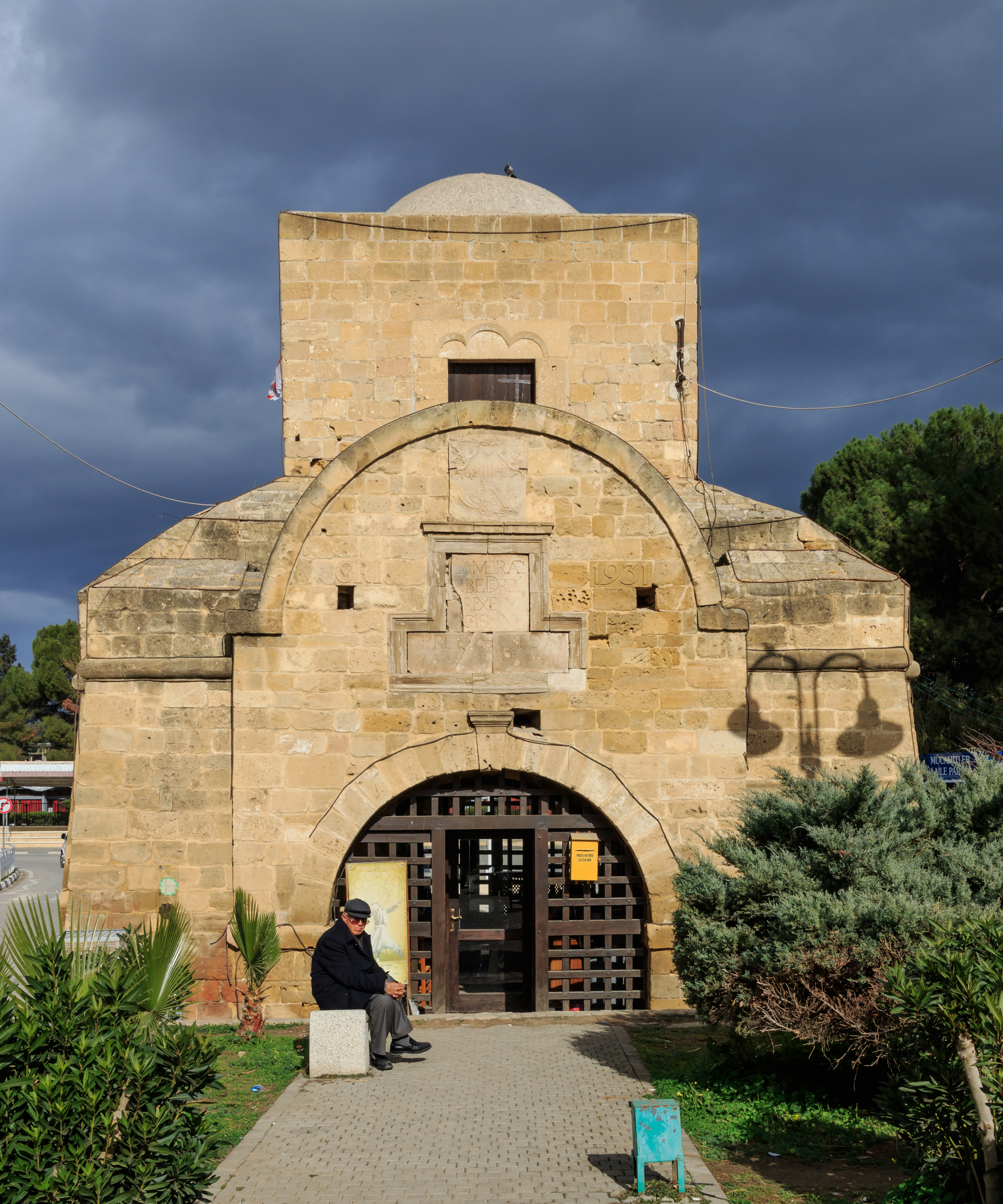
The Kyrenia Gate.

The Kyrenia Gate (Greek: Πύλη της Κερύνειας; Turkish: Girne Kapısı, historically known in Italian as Porta del Proveditore) is a gate in the Nicosia walls, in North Nicosia, Northern Cyprus. It was the gate which was used for transport to the northern areas, especially Kyrenia.

The gate was built in 1567 by Venetians, as a part of the new city walls. It was restored by the Ottomans in 1821, and a lookout was added to the gate for a probable Greek revolt.

Now, the gate is used as a tourism information office by the Nicosia Turkish Municipality.

Tablets from different periods hang on the gate. One of these is in Latin and dates from the Venetian period, featuring the date "MDLXII", (1562) when the construction of the gate began. The text in Latin was rediscovered when an inscription of the Quran placed by the Ottomans on it was removed in 1931 by the British. In the same year, "1931" and "GVRI", which is an abbreviation of "George V Rex et Imperator" ("George V, King and Emperor"), were inscribed on the gate to mark the date of the renovation and the reigning British monarch. A third inscription was placed by the Ottomans in 1821, who renovated the gate at the time, and bears the tughra of Mahmud II. The text in Arabic script reads: "O Muhammad, relay this news to those who have believed: the victory comes from Allah and its celebration is imminent. O, the opener of the gates, open gates that lead to good." The inscription was written by Sayyid Fazullah Dede, the head of the Nicosia Mevlevi Lodge, whose building is now preserved as the Mevlevi Tekke Museum.

== Etymology ==
The gate was called "Porta del Proveditore" or "Porta del Proveditore" by the Venetians when it was first built. Kevork K. Keshishian says that the word "Provveditore" is used to mean "military governor" in Italian and the name of the door refers to the governor of Cyprus. It states that the gate was named after a military architect, Proveditore Francesco Barbaro Nun. Keshishian says that Barbaro is "provveditore". Later, the gate was also named "Porta Bembo", after Laurenco Bembo, who was the governor of the island. The gate was called "Edirne Gate" in the Ottoman period. The gate was also known as the "Door of the Fortress" due to the presence of ammunition in the Armory Bastion to its west.

== History and usage ==
The walls of the 12-meter-high Nicosia city walls, which look quite massive, form a circle. The Venetians rebuilt the Nicosia walls between 1566 and 1568. Kyrenia Gate was built in 1567. The door would open at sunrise and close at sunset. Kyrenia Gate is a short passage with round arches and the square-planned guard room built on the upper part of the doorway is covered with a dome.

In 1821, the gate underwent a major repair by the Ottomans. At this time, they built a second floor at the gate, which was used as a guardhouse. The purpose of the construction of this floor was to protect the city against a possible Greek revolt. During the repair, a stone tablet from the Venetians describing the construction of the gate was found. This tablet is placed above the arch of the door. There is an inscription consisting of a chapter from the Qur'an on the tablet on the side facing the outside of the city, and next to it is the inscription 1931, the date when the walls on both sides of the door were demolished. The sure was written by Calligrapher Sheikh Feyzi Dede. On the side facing the city, the II. Mahmud's tughra.

== See also ==
- Famagusta Gate
