= National parks of Cyprus =

There are ten National Forest Parks in Cyprus:

Name	Established	Location	Area (ha)	Photo
Athalassa National Forest Park	1990	Lefkosia District South-eastern edge of the city of Nicosia	840	
Ayios Nikandros National Forest Park	2000	Famagusta District Near Ayia Napa	26	
Cape Greco National Forest Park	1993	Famagusta District Peninsula near Ayia Napa	385	
Liopetri Forest	1984	Famagusta District Village of Liopetri	89	
Machairas National Forest Park	2004	Lefkosia District 5 km from Lazanias	4523	
Pedagogical Academy National Forest Park	1983	Lefkosia District Aglandjia suburb of Nicosia	45	
Petra tou Romiou (Aphrodites Rock) National Forest Park (part of Ranti State Forest)	2001	Paphos District 10 km from Paphos	350	
Polemidia National Forest Park	1996	Limassol District 6 km north of the city centre of Limassol	125	
Rizoelia National Forest Park	1998	Larnaca District 3 km east of Aradippou and 7 km from Larnaca	97	
Troodos National Forest Park	1992	Limassol District Troodos Mountains	9147	

Proposals for the Akamas National Forest Park are under government review during 2022.
