= Zena Gunther de Tyras =

Cypriot philanthropist

- Ζήνα Κάνθερ ντε Τύρας
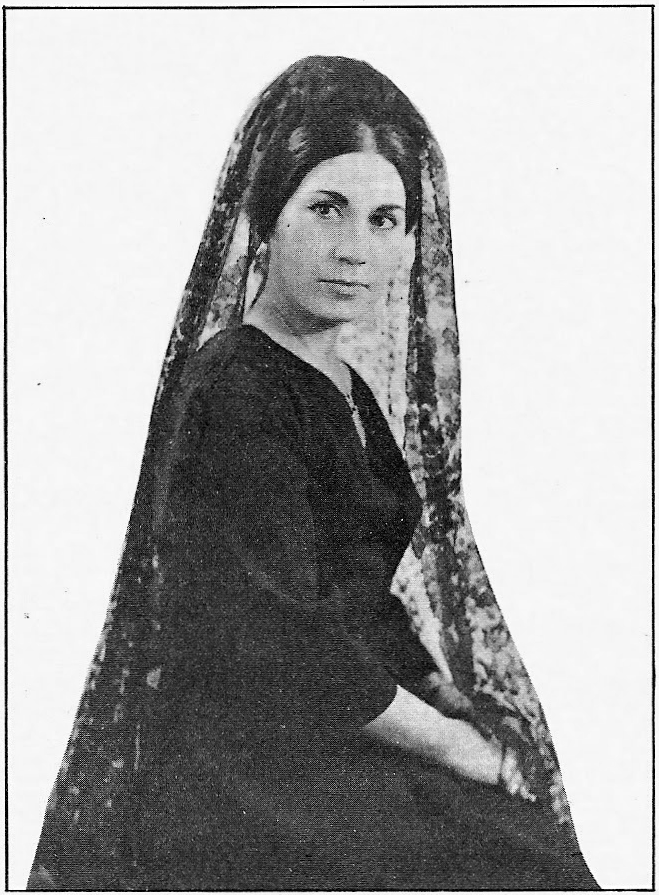
- Portrait taken before Zena's audience with Pope Paul VI (1960s/70s)
- Born: c. 1922 (Note: Zena's date of birth varies between sources. She herself claimed to have been born "around 1930". Some other sources give 1927 as the year of her birth. The 1922 date derives from multiple sources giving her age at her marriage to Christian Gunther (1952) as 30 and her age at the time of death (2012) as 90.); Tala, Paphos, Cyprus
- Died: 3 July 2012 (aged 90); Nicosia, Cyprus
- Spouse: Christian Gunther (m. 1952; died 1983)
- Children: 2
- Parent: Paul Crivez (adoptive father)

Zena Gunther de Tyras (Greek: Ζήνα Κάνθερ ντε Τύρας; c. 1922 – 3 July 2012), also known as Zena Kanther, (Note: "Kanther" being a Hellenised version of Gunther) was a prominent Cypriot philanthropist and socialite. Born into poverty as the youngest of ten children, Zena's early childhood was marked by hardships, both because of her family's financial situation and her abusive father. Originally named Theognosia, the name "Zena" was adopted during her career as a cabaret dancer. After becoming one of the most famous dancers in Cyprus, Zena escaped poverty in the 1950s through her marriage to the American millionaire Christian Gunther, though their marriage was marred by her husband's alcoholism and health issues.

Using funds secured through her marriage, Zena became a generous and influential charity donor, both in Cyprus and elsewhere. She supported public works, various organizations, churches, schools and hospitals and provided housing for both poor families and orphans. In addition to charity work, Zena was also politically involved in Cypriot affairs. She was heavily involved in the Cypriot struggle for independence from the British from 1955 to 1959, among other actions providing funding to the paramilitary EOKA. In 1967, Zena was adopted as the heir to the French eccentric Paul Crivez, the self-proclaimed "rightful heir" of the medieval Byzantine Empire, where after she was styled as the "Princess of Tyre". In 1971 Zena authored her autobiography A Life in the Wind and she has also been the subject of other literary works and a TV series. Zena died in 2012 after a decade of suffering from Alzheimer's disease. As one of the island's greatest benefactors, Zena holds a somewhat legendary status in Cyprus and several locations on the island are named in her honor.

== Background ==
=== Early life ===
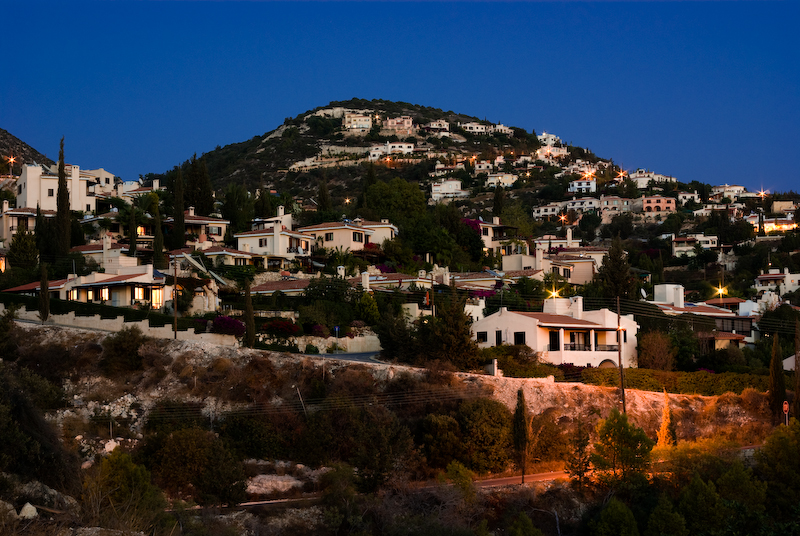
The village of Tala, Zena's birthplace

Zena Gunther de Tyras was born c. 1922 in the village of Tala, near Paphos, Cyprus. Her birth name was Theognosia, "Zena" and the surnames being adopted later in life. Zena was born into poverty and was the youngest of ten children; she had six older brothers and three older sisters. By the time of her birth all of her siblings, save for a seventeen-year old elder sister, had left home. Zena had a difficult childhood; her father was an abusive womanizer who often shouted at and beat her mother, herself and her sister. In one incident, her father rubbed her mother's face into the ground in an attempt to deform her. As his attempts to seek a divorce were unfruitful, Zena's father repeatedly threatened to kill her mother. For most of Zena's early life, her elder sister took care of her and much of the housework. Her father became even more violent and succumbed to alcoholism after being wrongfully accused of committing a robbery, but he eventually left the family.

As her family was unable to support themselves financially, Zena left school, having only been taught the basics of reading and writing. Since her mother and sister were working during the days there was no one to look after Zena and her mother made her sit under a tree in the village square, relying on the kindness of strangers for food and money. When Zena was ten years old, she moved to Limassol with her mother and sister. In Limassol she secured a job as a maid, working until the age of sixteen. For the first year she worked completely unpaid. During the family's time in Limassol, Zena also simultaneously worked two years in a clinic. A few years later Zena met and fell in love with a 23-year-old man named Lefkos, originally from Paphos. Though her mother was hesitant at first, she eventually gave her consent for the two to become engaged. After four or five months of living together, Zena became pregnant. At the same time, Lefkos's mother expressly forbade the two to marry each other. As a result, Lefkos abandoned her and Zena gave birth to their son, Socrates, alone.

Because she needed to work, Zena left Socrates with other women and only saw him when she picked him up at night. After a few months, Zena befriended a man named Alexander. Despite working for nearly all waking hours every day, Zena had by this point little to no money left and owed money both to her local grocer and in rent. After she confessed her difficulties to Alexander one day, he took pity on her and paid off her debts. Around the same time, the woman who took care of Socrates asked to adopt him. Though Zena saw this as cruel, she was forced to accept due to her financial situation. At the same time, Zena was more or less abandoned by her family; although her elder sister had asked her for money to get married and Zena sent funds immediately, she was the only sibling not invited to the wedding. Zena increasingly fell in love with Alexander. The two were engaged after a few years of living together but he died shortly thereafter.

=== Cabaret dancer ===
Once again unable to support herself financially, Zena began working as a cabaret dancer after receiving the suggestion from a friend. At the time of taking the job, Zena was not yet aware of how exploitative the nightclub industry was. She worked hard to prepare, taking fitness and rhythmic classes for five hours a day, and her debut in Limassol was a resounding success. The name "Zena" was first adopted during her time as a cabaret dancer. She also worked in other cities, including Nicosia and Larnaca, and quickly became one of the most famous cabaret dancers in Cyprus, well known for her sophisticated and raunchy shows. Zena later described her work as a cabaret dancer as tormenting, and remembered having to handle men who hugged and stuck on to her carefully and politely in order to not lose her job.

== Marriage to Christian Gunther ==
Zena's luck turned when she met her future husband, Christian Gunther. The two first met when Zena rushed to his aid after he had been robbed and beaten in the street. Gunther came back to the nightclub where Zena worked to thank her and the two quickly became friends; they ate and drank together, and Gunther frequently drove her home from work. Gunther was American, though he had been born on Cyprus, and was unbeknownst to Zena a millionaire, having acquired a fortune through mining and through the oil industry. Shortly after Gunther proposed to her he was involved in a serious car accident, from which Zena helped him recover. Upon their marriage in 1952, several newspapers in Cyprus wrote that she was lucky and compared her to Cinderella. Zena took great offense to such articles since she only learnt of her husband's wealth after the marriage, when she was told about his fortune by his lawyer during the process of getting an American passport.

Gunther, thirty years old at the time of their marriage, suffered from alcoholism and was constantly unsuccessfully trying to recover; after their honeymoon in Beirut, Gunther continued to drink. Though Zena tried to guard her husband's health, he fell deeper into alcoholism. Although Zena often felt that her efforts were in vain and that she was slowly losing her husband, the two at times also enjoyed more stable periods of travelling and spending time together. Although grateful of having escaped poverty, Zena later surmised that her life with Gunther had been "another hell", filled with anxiety and marked with constant monitoring, attention, visits to clinics and visits by doctors. Gunther died in 1983, having been seen little in public for the last twenty years of his life.

== Career ==
=== Involvement in Cypriot affairs ===
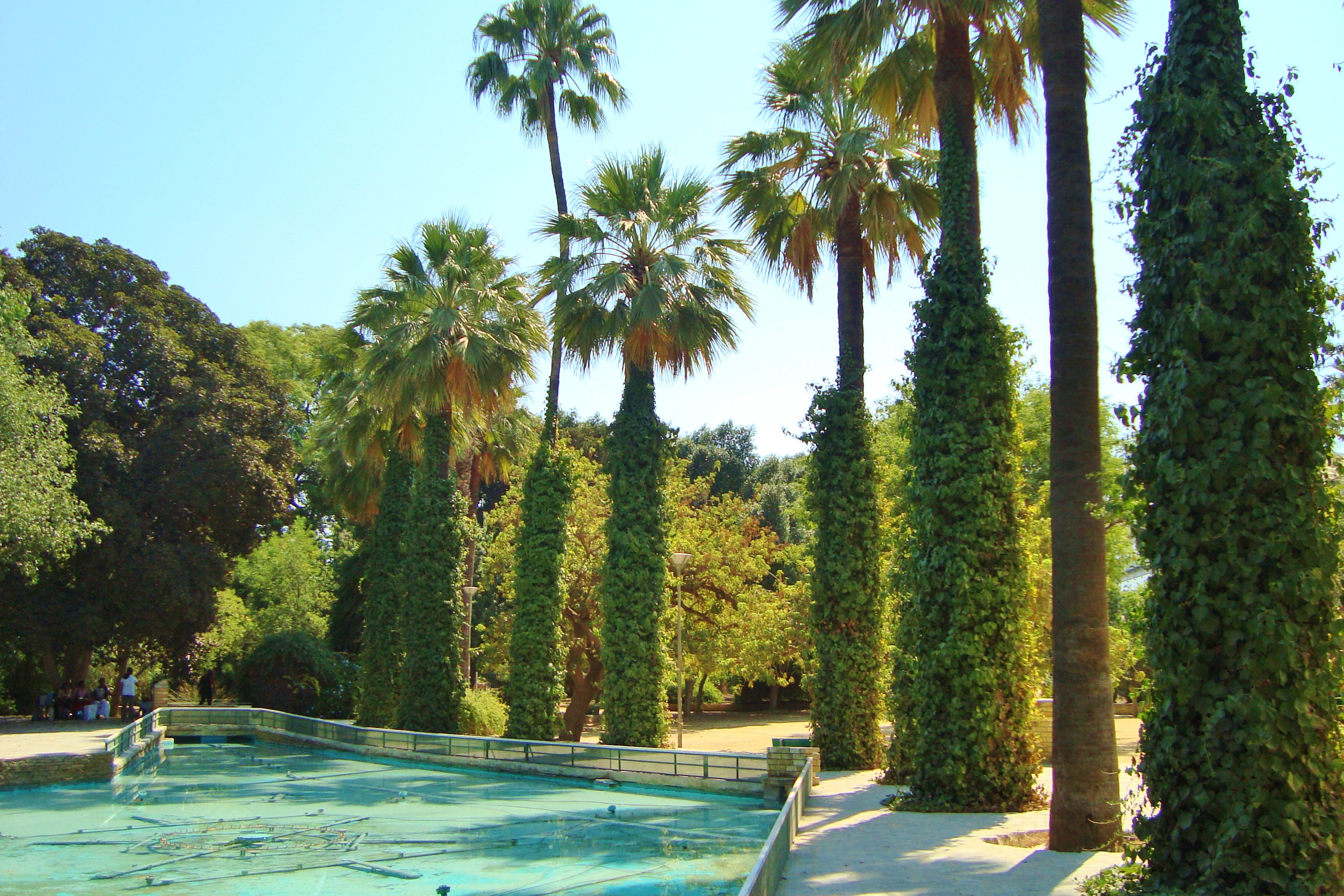
The Nicosia municipal gardens, created in 1969, were funded by Zena

Through the funds secured through her marriage, Zena began to spend enormous amounts of money on various charity works. She paid for housing for families and orphans, education for children and donated large sums to various organizations, churches, schools and hospitals. She also subsidized the construction of sport stadiums, financed sport teams, financially supported communities and municipalities, and financed the construction of several schools and churches. Among the prominent Cypriot projects she financed was the Nicosia municipal gardens in 1969, the largest municipal gardens in the city. Numerous poor people who asked her for help were also given financial support and aid.

The projects supported by Zena were not limited to Cyprus; she also supported numerous projects in Greece, as well as in other countries. In the early years of her marriage to Gunther, she often faced problems with the managers of his property, who intervened every time she wanted to do a charity project and forced her to fight.

Zena was heavily involved in the Cypriot struggle for independence from the British from 1955 to 1959. A friend of Georgios Grivas, leader of the paramilitary EOKA, Zena helped finance groups who opposed British rule over the island and also financed purchases of weapons. Her actions were not merely financial; at one time during the struggle she hid Grivas in her own basement. Zena's political involvement continued after Cyprios independence was achieved. She may have funded the later EOKA B during its 1974 coup attempt and in July 1978 she was implicated in a supposed conspiracy reported by Cypriot president Spyros Kyprianou which involved the German ambassador and various politicians and celebrities. As a result, she was held by the police for eight days.

In 1960, Zena built a massive summerhouse in Prodromos, Cyprus. The house had around 650–825 square meters (7000–8900 square feet) of interior space, several verandas and a swimming pool. Throughout the 1960s Zena often used to house to host important and influential people and musicians. From 1970 onwards, the house largely ceased to be used and Zena unsuccessfully worked to sell it.

=== Princess of Tyre ===
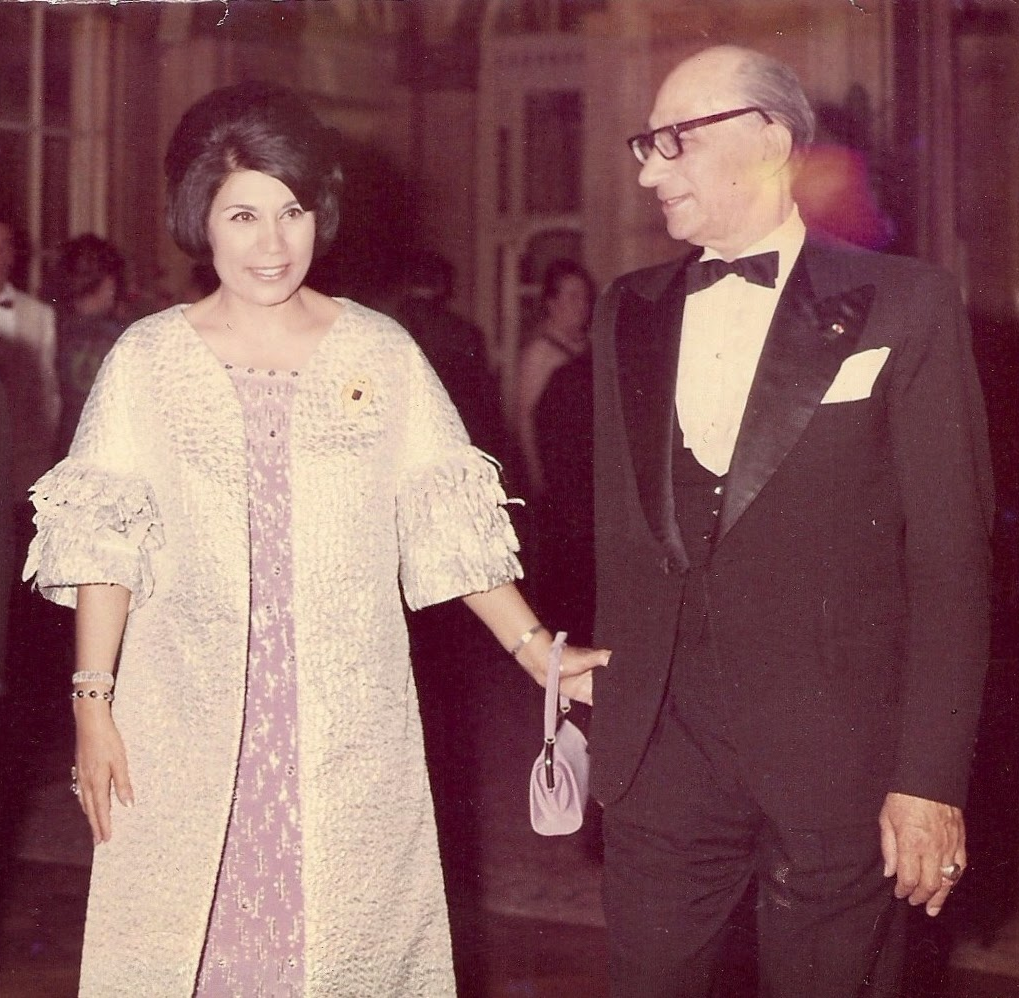
Zena with Paul Crivez at a reception at the Grand Hotel in Rome

In 1967, Zena was adopted by the French eccentric Paul Crivez (1894–1984). Crivez had himself been adopted into the French-Romanian Paléologue family and through them claimed to be the heir of the medieval Byzantine Palaiologos dynasty and the rightful Byzantine emperor. Crivez was childless and adopted Zena as the heir to his claims and titles, designating her as the "princess of Tyre". She was made the chancellor of Crivez's self-founded chivalric order and accompanied Crivez during an audience with Pope Paul VI during which she was presented as the "heiress to the Empire of the Orient". Documents published by Crivez referred to Zena as "Zena Paléologue de Tyras", though she herself later went under the name Zena Gunther de Tyras. After her adoption as "imperial heir", Zena continued to be a global socialite, a major charity donor and a prominent personality both in Cyprus and elsewhere.

Zena eventually reconnected with both her mother and her son Socrates. When her mother reached an old age, Zena brought her to live with her in Nicosia. Though she at times clashed with Socrates the two were largely on good terms and Zena financed his schooling at a private school in Athens and frequently hosted his children (her grandchildren) at her summerhouse. She also adopted her niece Agathia, though changed her name to Veronica.

== Later life and death ==
Zena published her autobiography A Life in the Wind in 1971. She spent her last years living in relative isolation in her villa in the Lykavittos area of Nicosia. For the last ten years of her life Zena suffered from Alzheimer's disease. She died at the age of 90 on 3 July 2012 after an extended period of time in a coma.

== Legacy ==
Zena remains recognized as one of the greatest benefactors of Cyprus and has achieved a somewhat legendary status on the island. She was in her lifetime honored with multiple awards, including the title of Knight of St. Dionysios of Zakynthos, the Holy Cross of the Apostle and Evangelist Mark (granted by the Patriarchate of Alexandria), as well as numerous golden keys to cities in various countries, most prominently in Greece. Numerous locations in Cyprus are named in Zena's honor, including a street and a cinema in Nicosia, Zena Palace. In addition to her own autobiography, Zena's life story has also found its way into other writings. In 1997, the Cypriot author Gristakis Georgiou published Archipelagos: Twenty Years in Labour, a thinly fictionalized rendition of Zena's life story. In 2019, Zena's granddaughter Maria Kanther wrote a best-selling biography of Zena's life titled Princess Zena Kanther de Tyras and also a screenplay for a TV series released in 2020.

After Zena's death in 2012, her large summerhouse in Prodromos fell into the ownership of the Bank of Cyprus since her family was unable to maintain it and it was purchased by a private owner in 2019. Though not officially recognized as architectural heritage by the Cypriot government, the summerhouse was in 2020 archived and studied as 20th-century architectural heritage as part of Nonument, an international artistic and research project created by the Museum of Transitory Art in Ljubljana, Slovenia.
