= Alsos Forest =

Natural park in Nicosia, Cyprus

Pedagogical Academy National Forest Park
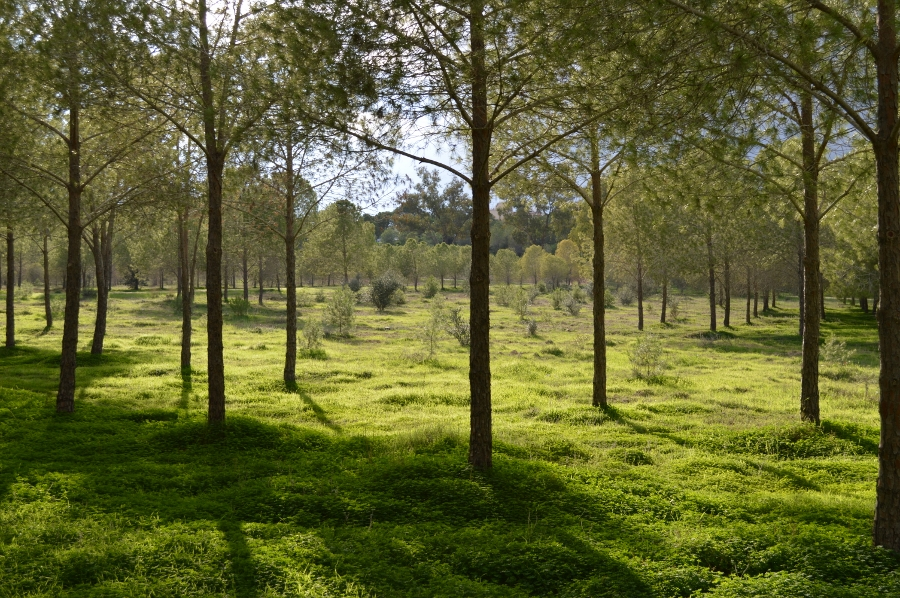
- View of Alsos Forest.
- Type: Public park
- Location: Nicosia
- Area: Aglandjia, Pallouriotissa
- Operator: Nicosia Municipality

Pedagogical Academy National Forest Park (officially Εθνικό Δασικό Πάρκο Παιδαγωγικής Ακαδημίας) is one of the municipal parks of Nicosia. The park forms an almost unbroken stretch of open land reaching from Pallouriotissa to Aglandjia. The forest is bounded on the northwest by the entrance to the University of Cyprus, and overlooks Cyprus European Presidential building and Aglandjia Public High School, located to its southeast. The park is one of Nicosia's largest ecological havens. It hosts a large playground, cafeteria, paths through the forest for pedestrians, and basketball and football courts.

== History ==
The park was largely developed during the early 20th century. Most of the land had previously been a large wetland with shallow bodies of water. It had a large number of hammocks, or dry-land protrusions, covered by aquatic vegetation. Under the effort of the British colonial government during their administration of the island, numerous Eucalyptus trees, brought from Australia, were planted, in order to absorb the water.

== See also ==
- Nicosia municipal gardens
- Cyprus
