= Paul Crivez =

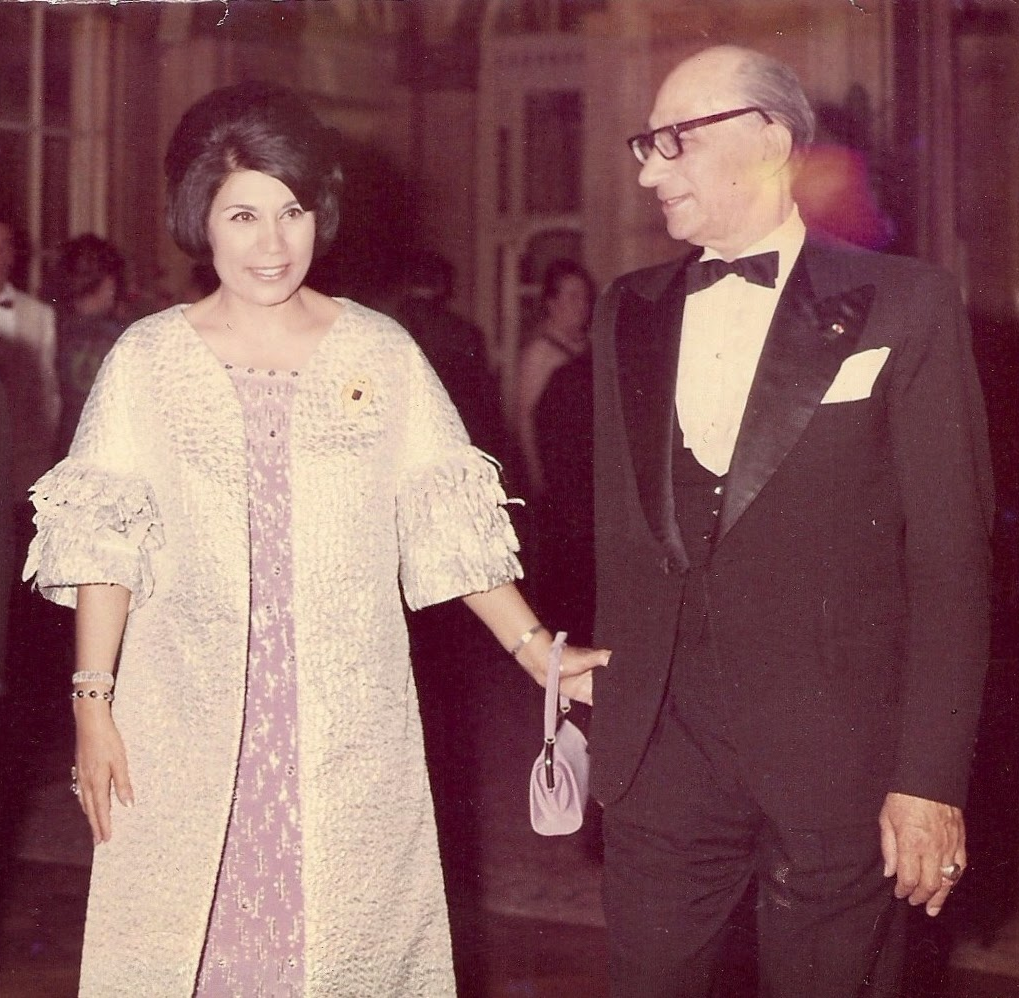
Paul Crivez (right) with his adoptive heir Zena Gunther (left) at a reception at the Grand Hotel in Rome

Paul Crivez (1894–1984), self-styled as Prince Paul Theodore Paléologue-Crivez from 1945 onwards, was a French eccentric and pretender. Through adoption by Alexandrine Paléologue, the widow of a man by the name of Grégoire Paléologue, Crivez claimed to represent the legitimate heir of the Palaiologos dynasty of Byzantine emperors. Crivez forged genealogies linking Grégoire Paléologue to the ancient dynasty, making him out to be a descendant of Manuel Palaiologos, a nephew of the last emperor Constantine XI Palaiologos. Among his activities as the "dethroned sovereign of the eastern empire of Constantinopolis" were granting titles of nobility, claiming the position of Grand Master of the Constantinian Order of Saint George, appointing his own Patriarch as well as attempting to make the Vatican canonize Constantine XI as a saint.

== Biography ==
Paul Crivez was born 1894. As a young man, Crivez met and befriended Alexandrine Paléologue (born Boutcoulesco), the widow of Grégoire Paléologue, a cousin of Maurice Paléologue, a French diplomat of Romanian origin whose family claimed connections to the Byzantine Palaiologos dynasty. The Romanian Paleologu family can be confidently traced back to 17th and 18th-century Phanariots (members of prominent Greek families in the Fener quarter of Constantinople), but not to the old imperial dynasty.

In the 1940s, Crivez began to work on his pretensions, hatching a scheme to integrate himself into Grégoire Paléologue's family. He forged an elaborate genealogy which linked the Romanian Paleologi to the ancient dynasty, supposedly as descendants of Manuel Palaiologos, a nephew of the last emperor Constantine XI Palaiologos, and thus made them out to be the senior heirs to the defunct imperial throne. Crivez's genealogy notably differed from the genealogy of Maurice Paléologue, actually a member of the Romanian Paleologu family, who instead claimed descent from Theodore II Palaiologos, a brother of Constantine XI. Crivez's genealogy also made the modern Romanian Paleologi out to be relatives of the Romanian noble Ghica family. Modern members of the Ghica family have in response to Crivez's claims refuted any kinship between their family and the Palaiologos dynasty. After creating his genealogy, Crivez convinced Alexandrine to adopt him, invoking a supposed ancient Byzantine protocol that in the absence of legitimate children, the emperor's widow could nominate the new imperial heir. Thus, on 11 June 1945, Paul Crivez became "Prince Paul Theodore Paléologue-Crivez", the supposed new head of the imperial house of Palaiologos. Crivez claimed the Byzantine succession solely through his adoption by Alexandrine, as he did not claim any noble origins for himself.

As the supposed rightful Byzantine emperor, styling himself as the "dethroned sovereign of the eastern empire of Constantinopolis", Crivez also extended imperial honors to his younger brother Alexandre (who died in 1976), naming him the "Prince of the Morea". He also claimed to be the rightful Grand Master of the Constantinian Order of Saint George, a chivalric order with invented Byzantine connections. As the emperors of Byzantium often did, Crivez also appointed his own claimant Patriarch, appointing a French professor and poet as "Mar. Aloysius III, Head of the Catholic Evangelical Communion". Crivez repeatedly and unsuccessfully petitioned the Vatican to canonize Constantine XI Palaiologos as a saint. He was an acquaintance of Giorgio Quntini Paleologo, a scion of the Paleologo-Oriundi family, an Italian family that also claims Palaiologos descent, as well as Irakli Bagration, a Georgian prince. In addition to his pretensions, he was also a poet and a painter, whose work was at one point exhibited in Venice.

In the 1960s, Crivez grew acquainted with Zena Gunther, a Cypriot woman who had been born poor but had acquired a fortune through marriage to Christian Gunther, a wealthy American, becoming a global socialite and a major donor to charities across the world. Gunther accepted the style "Princess Zena Gunther de Tyras", bestowed on her by Crivez in 1967. She was to use this style for the rest of her life, until her death in 2012, and even published her autobiography, A Life in the Wind, in this name. Crivez soon adopted Gunther as his heir, and she was even presented as such during an audience between Crivez and Pope Paul VI. Crivez died in 1984, still maintaining his claim to be the rightful emperor.

== See also ==
- Succession to the Byzantine Empire
