= Nicosia municipal gardens =

Coordinates: 35.173°N 33.354°E

Nicosia Municipal Gardens
- Interactive map of the Nicosia Municipal Gardens area

General information
- Status: Completed
- Location: Nicosia, Cyprus
- Completed: 1969; 57 years ago
- Owner: nicosia municipality

Design and construction
- Developer: Joannou & Paraskevaides Company Ltd

Nicosia municipal gardens are the largest municipal gardens located in Nicosia, Cyprus. They are in the centre of the city.

== Gallery ==
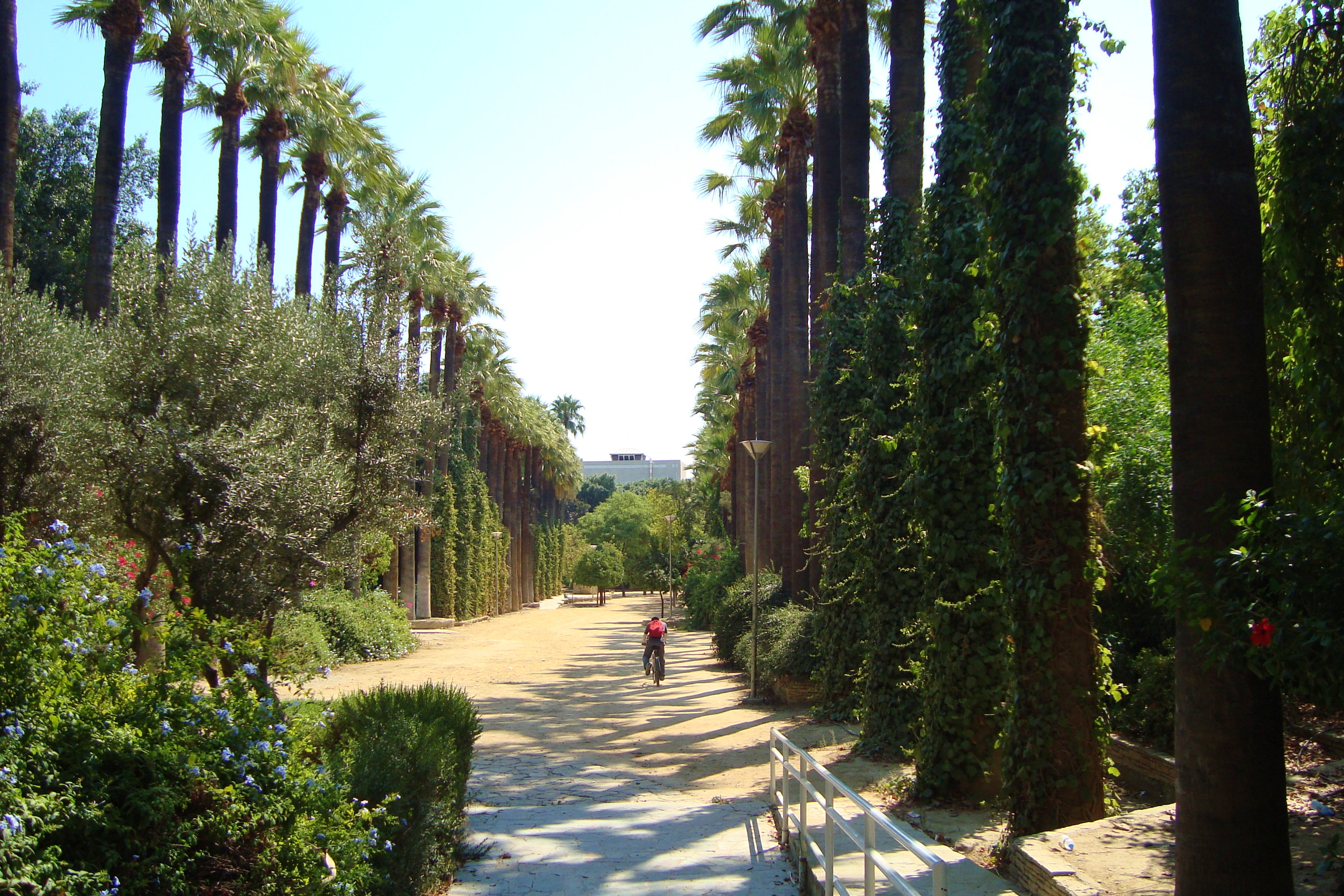

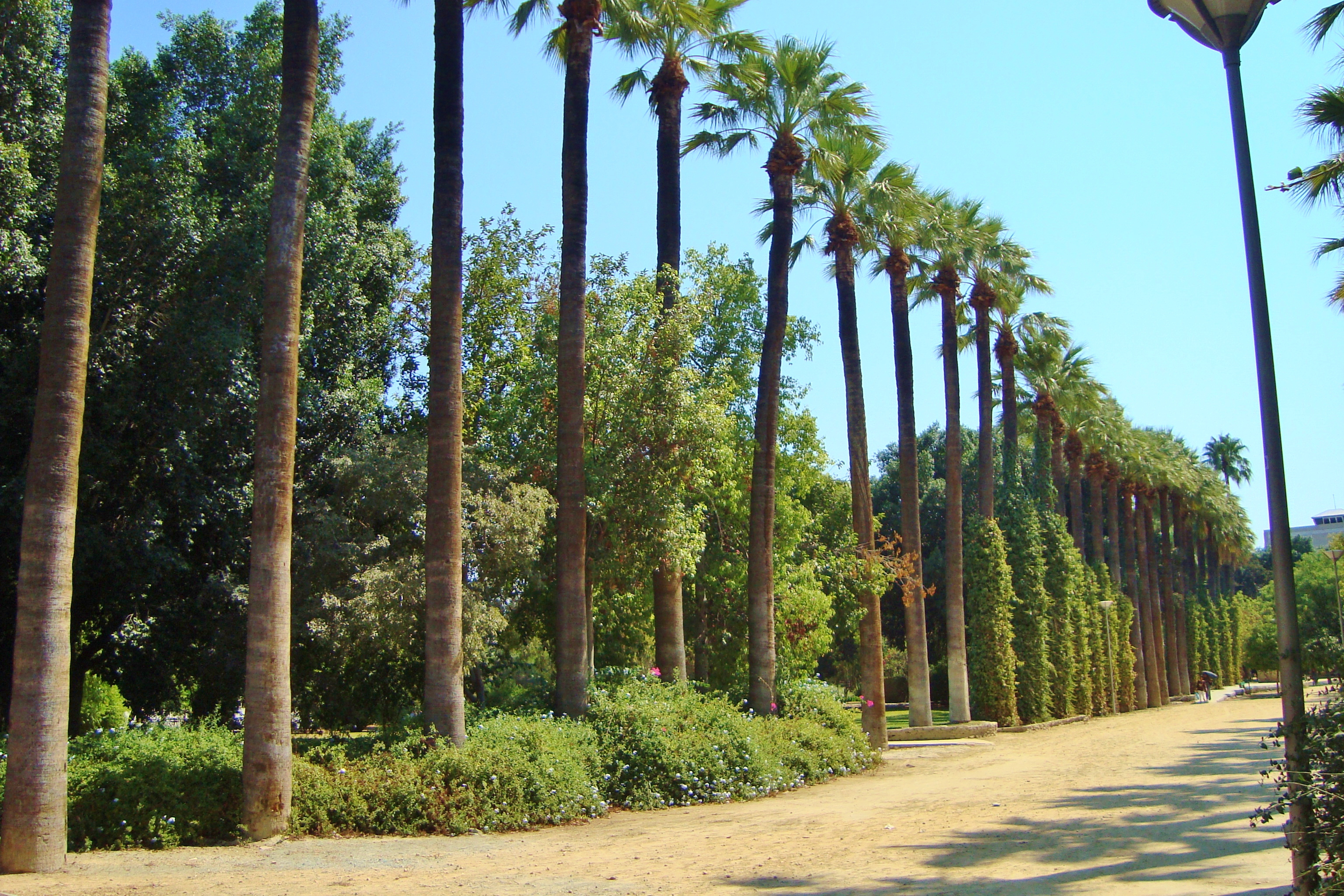

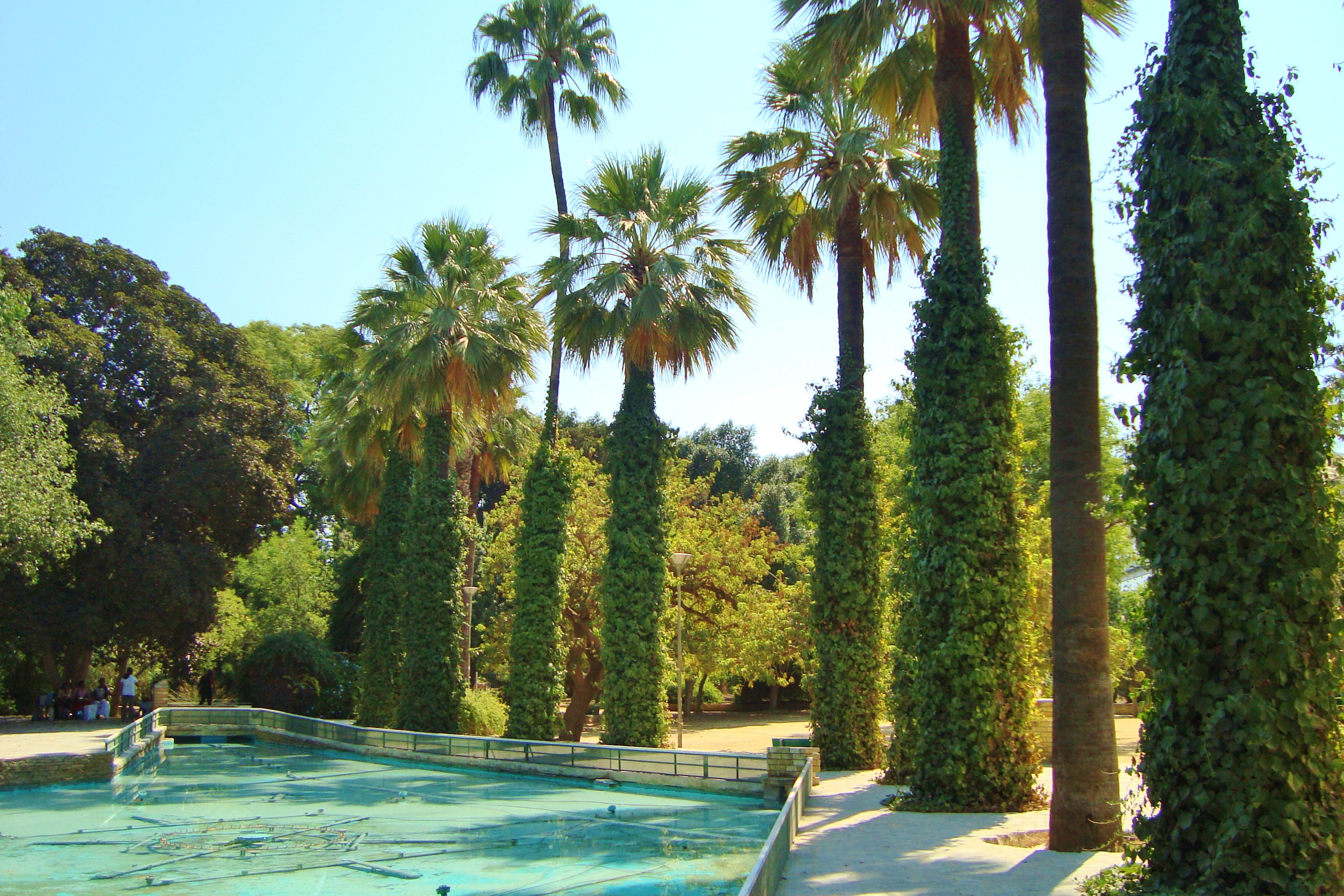

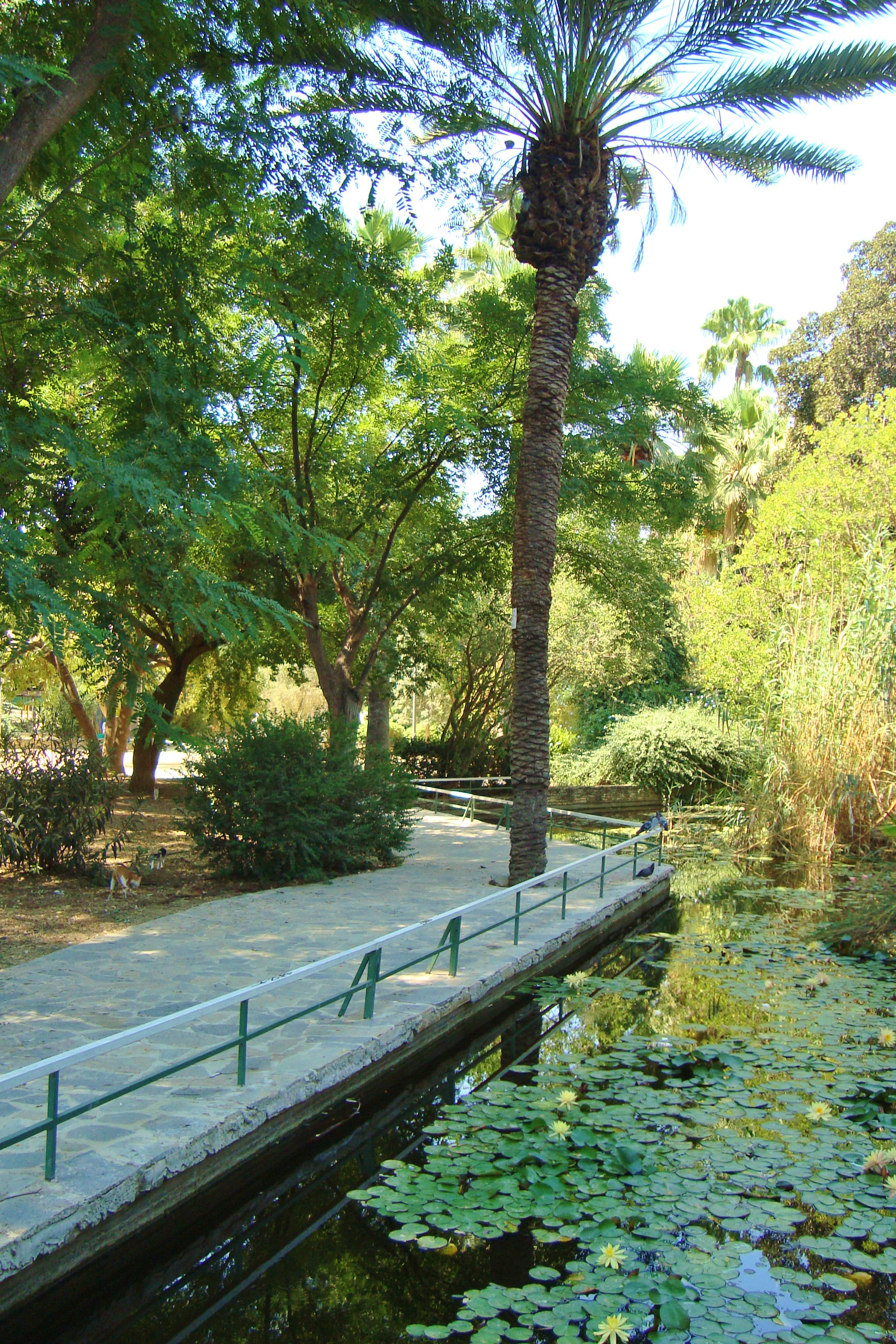

== See also ==
- Alsos Forest
- Nicosia
- Cyprus
