= Aglandjia =

Aglandjia: Αγλαντζιά (Greek); Eylence (Turkish)
- Municipality
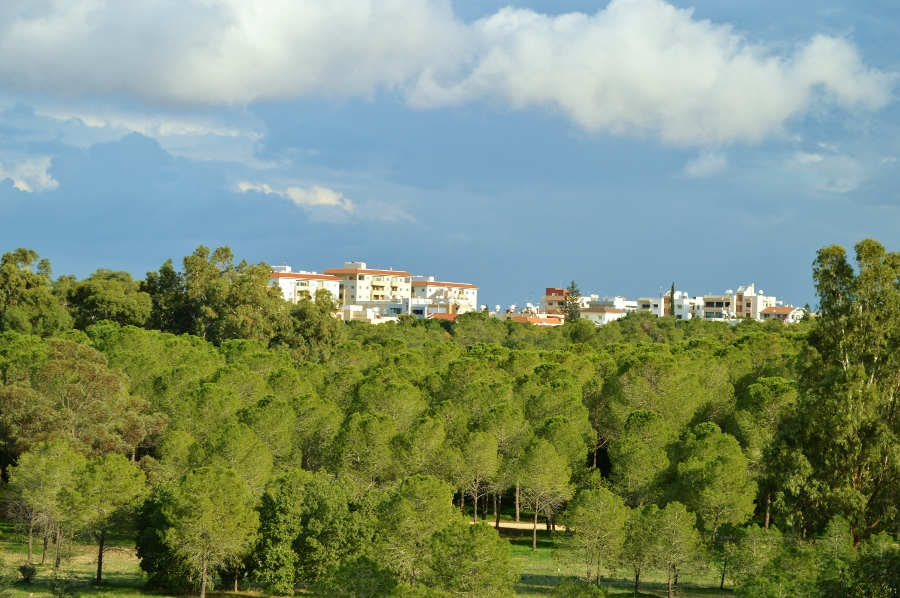
- Alsos Akadimias National Forest

- Seal

- Location within Cyprus Location within the Eastern Mediterranean Location within the European Union Location within Asia
- Coordinates: 35.14592°N 33.390169°E
- Country: Cyprus
- District: Nicosia District
- Urban area: Nicosia

Area
  - Municipality: 21.37 km^{2} (8.25 sq mi)

Population (2011)
  - Municipality: 20,783
  - Density: 972.5/km^{2} (2,519/sq mi)
- Time zone: UTC+2 (EET)
  - Summer (DST): UTC+3 (EEST)
- Postal code: 4700
- Website: http://www.aglantzia.org.cy

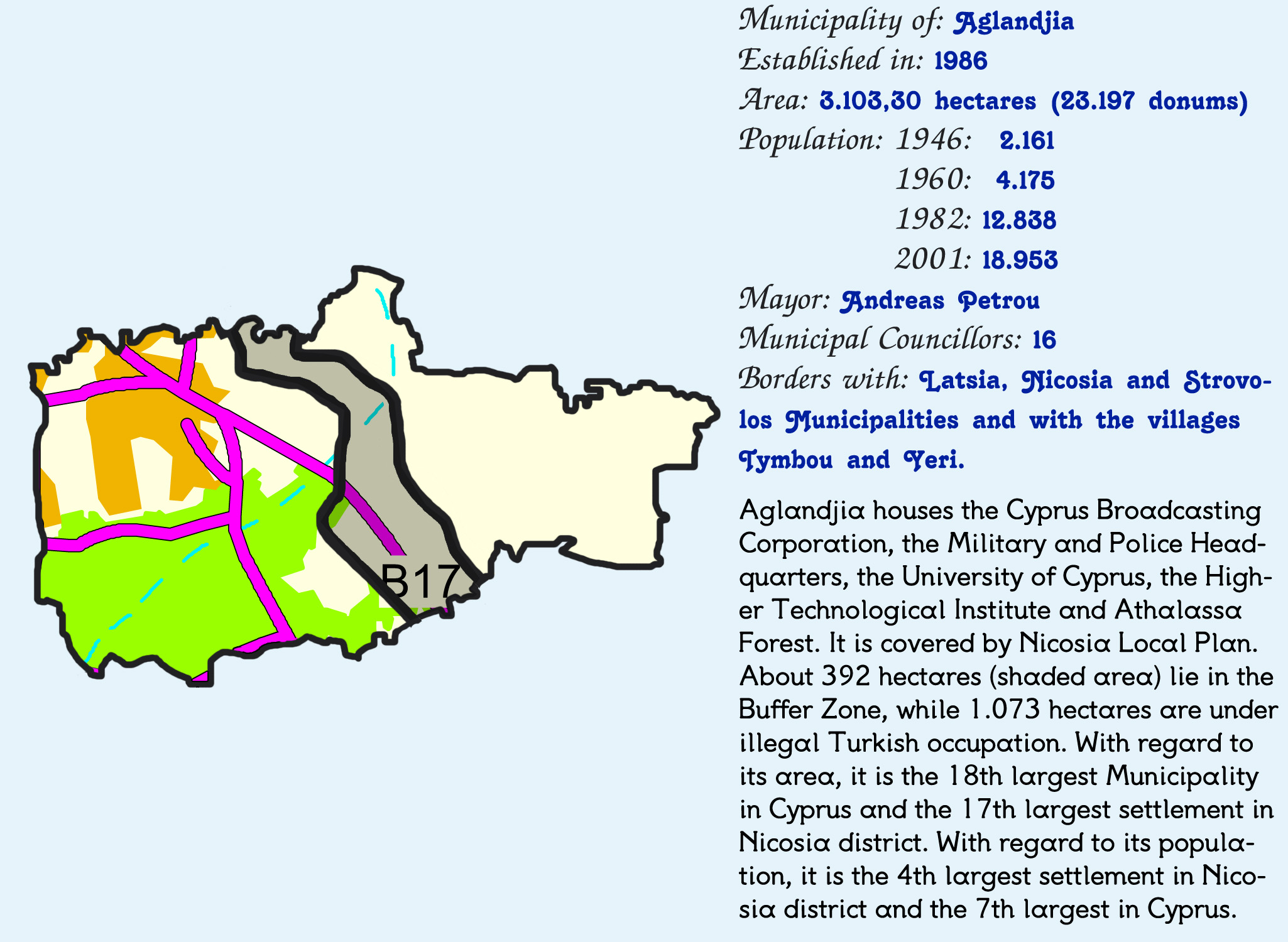
Concise presentation of Aglandjia

Aglandjia (Greek: Αγλαντζιά [locally [aɣlaˈnd͡ʒa]]; Turkish: Eylence) is a suburb and municipality of Nicosia, Cyprus. The municipality has a population of 20,783 (2011) and is contiguous with the Nicosia Municipality.

Aglandjia is near the buffer zone. It has an area of about 31 km^{2}, of which 14 km^{2} is agricultural land that has been occupied by the Turkish army since 1974; of the remaining 17 km^{2}, 9 km^{2} are national forest parks (Athalassa park, 8.6 km^{2} and Pedagogical Academy park 0.4 km^{2}).

== Name ==
The word Aglandjia is of Turkish origin, deriving from eğlence, meaning "entertainment". Its pronunciation in Cypriot Greek is [aɣlaˈnd͡ʒa].

Another theory states that the name derives from the surname of the Frankish family de Aglande, who owned the area during the Frankish rule in Middle Ages.

== Administration ==
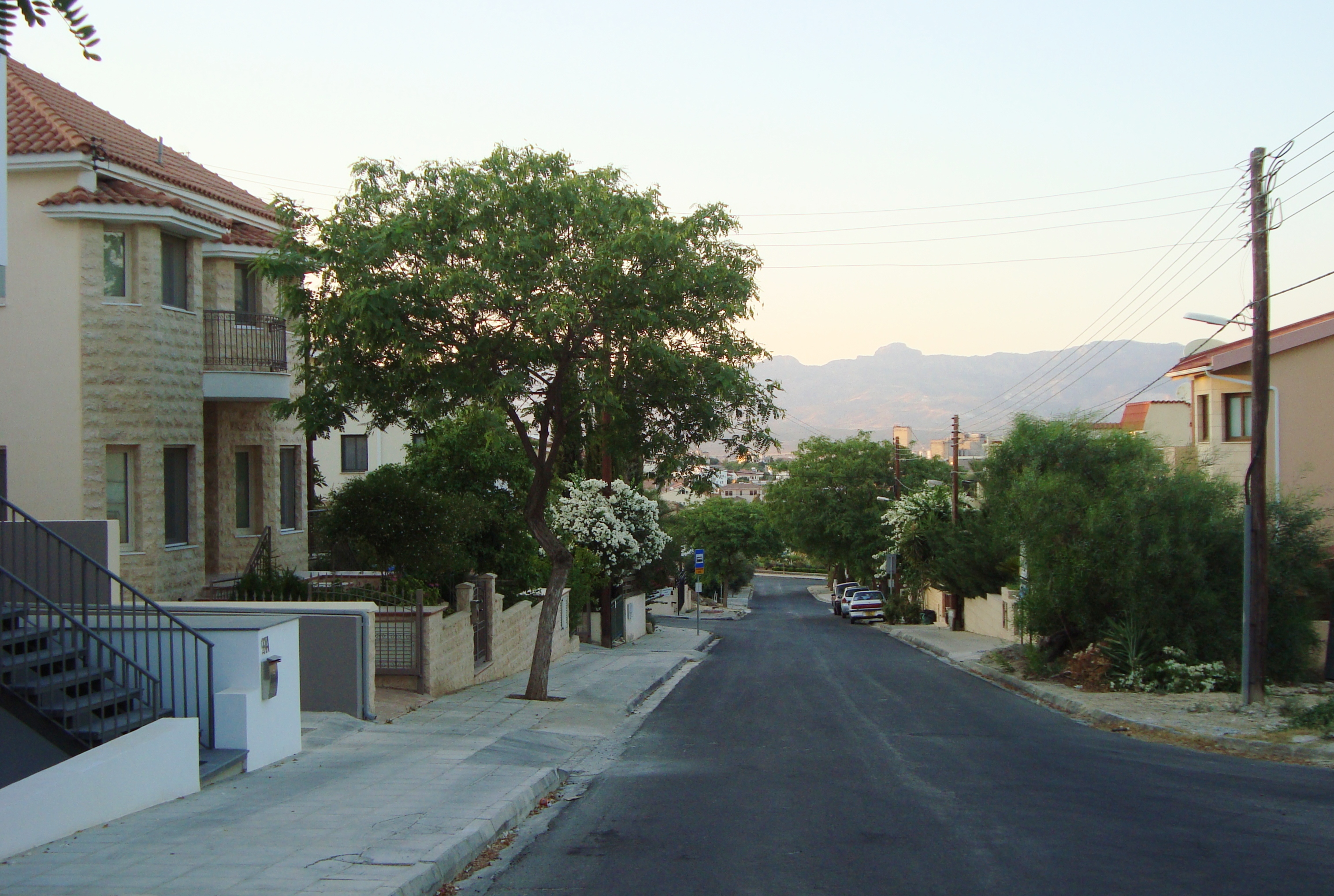
A street in Aglandjia

Aglandjia was declared a Municipality by a referendum in May 1986. The Municipal Council is made up of the mayor and sixteen Municipal Councilors. The current mayor is Andreas Konstantinou. Aglandjia Municipality employs 24 permanent employees and 30 workers (permanent and casual) who staff the services below, which have their seat in the Town Hall:

- Secretariat
- Technical services
- Financial services
- Greenery and Environment services
- Hygiene services
- Cultural services

== History ==
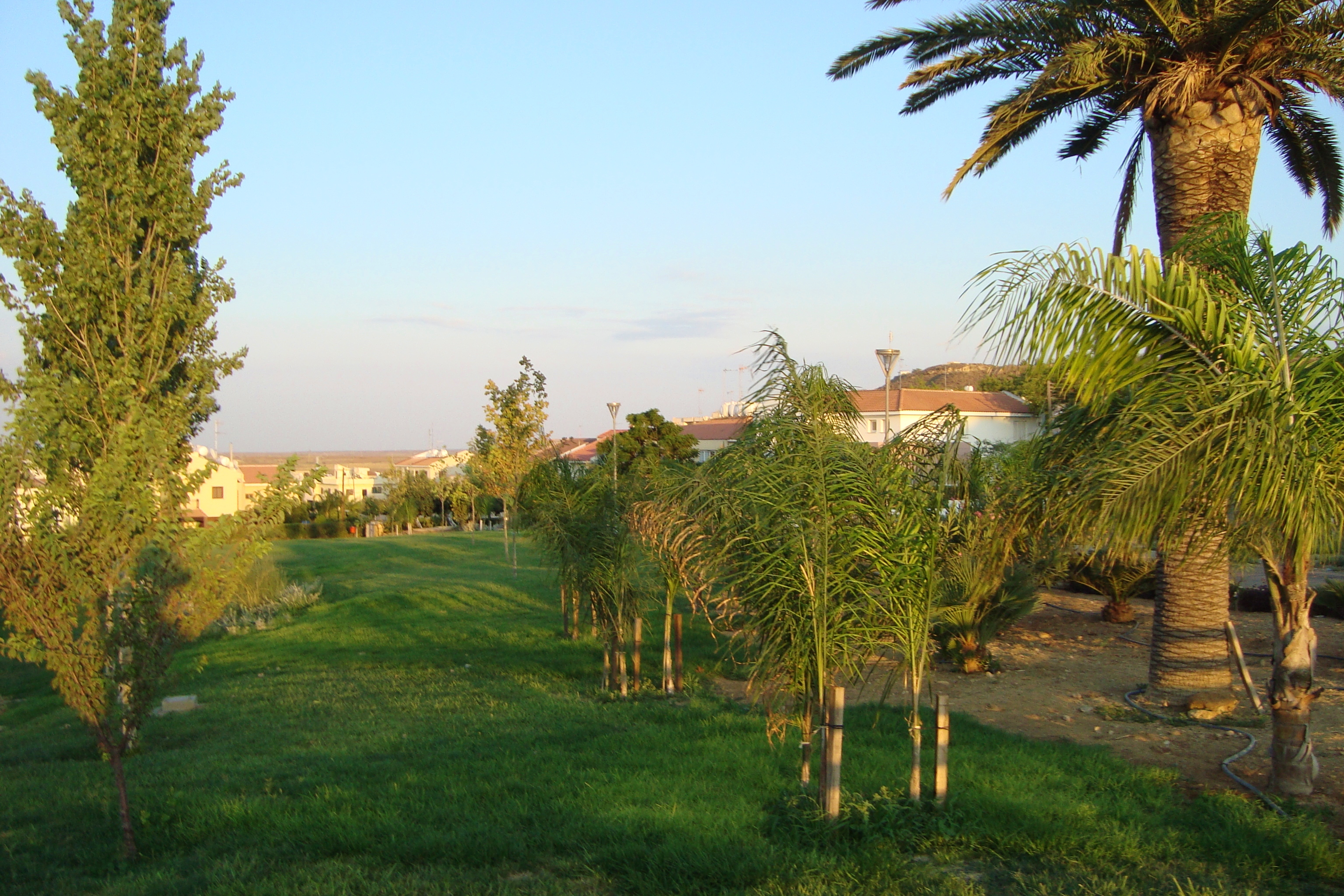
A park in Aglandjia

The history of Aglandjia goes back as far as 3888 BC. Several tombs dating to the Bronze Age have been found on Arona Hill (Mount Lion or Liontarovounos). The hill is strategically located for the defense of the area, so the settlement there was most likely a military deployment during the first phase of its history.

Around the hill there was an ancient settlement, from which the city of Ledra may have originated. Archaeological works of art and inscriptions in the Cypriot syllabary have been found in Kafizin or Small Aronas, a historic site with a cave dedicated to the worship of a Nymph. These objects indicate the site was in use as a place of worship during the Hellenistic period, specifically between 225 and 218 BC, during the reigns of Ptolemy the Benefactor and Ptolemy Philopatoras.

A variety of locally manufactured pottery was also found at the site, including various bowls, two-handled vessels, cup-bearers, feeding bottles, mud-lighters, jars, cooking utensils, frying pans, wash basins, jugs, combined pots, urns, amphorae, rhytons, large jars and jar lids, and objects testifying to the practice of weaving.

In the Middle Ages, the Lefkomiatis settlement was in the area of Aglandjia. The area seems to have been inhabited towards the end of Frankish rule, during the reign of Jacques II (1468–1473). The medieval La Cava castle, built on Arona hill around 1385 by King Jacques I, was used as an observatory for the control of the road leading from Larnaca to Nicosia.The castle took its name from the large rock cistern which still survives today. The castle was blasted by the Venetians during the third decade of the 16th century, while the Ottomans used the bigger of its two towers as a powder magazine. Up until 1870 a considerable amount of the castle was still standing, including the vaulted hall, the curtain walls, and two towers. However, the majority of the castle was pulled down in that year to build the Church of Phaneromeni. In 1888 the area was excavated by M. R. James. The castle was proclaimed an ancient moment in 1915. Today a portion of the Great Tower and Second Tower exists together with the cistern.

After the conquest of Cyprus by the Ottomans, the Aglandjia settlement declined. It started to form a self-sufficient rural settlement around the end of the 18th century whose inhabitants engaged in farming, stockbreeding, and quarrying. Around the end of the 18th century, Dragoman Hadjigeorgakis Kornesios erected Ayios Yeoryios church on the site of the cemetery and Ayios Yeoryios church in Athalassa.

Aglandjia contributed organized groups to the EOKA struggle, and local volunteers also participated in the events of 1964. Aglandjia was bombed during the Turkish invasion of 1974. The Turkish army continues to occupy 45% of the municipality's territory.

== International relations ==
=== Twin towns – Sister cities ===
Aglandjia is twinned with:

- Zografou, Greece (since 1988)
- Kalamata, Greece (since 1993)
- Azov, Russia (since 1998)

=== Friendly cities ===
Aglandjia also cooperates with:

- Fontaine l'Eveque, Belgium
- Bucharest, Romania
- Kyiv, Ukraine
- Rome, Italy
