= Civilian casualties and displacements during the Cyprus conflict =

This article covers the civilian casualties and displacements that occurred between 1963 and 1975 – from the outbreak of the intercommunal fighting until the end of displacements following the Turkish invasion of Cyprus.

== 1963–64: Cypriot intercommunal violence ==
On 21 December 1963, serious violence erupted in Nicosia when a Greek Cypriot police patrol, checking identification documents, stopped a Turkish Cypriot couple on the edge of the Turkish quarter. A hostile crowd gathered, shots were fired, and three people (two Turkish Cypriots and one Greek Cypriot) were killed. As the news spread, members of underground organizations began firing and taking hostages. North of Nicosia, Turkish forces occupied a strong position at St. Hilarion Castle, dominating the road to Kyrenia on the northern coast. The road became a principal combat area as both sides fought to control it. Much intercommunal fighting occurred in Nicosia along the line separating the Greek and Turkish quarters of the city (known later as the Green Line). Turkish Cypriots call this period Bloody Christmas.

Severe intercommunal fighting occurred in March and April 1964. When the worst of the fighting was over, Turkish Cypriots began moving from isolated rural areas and mixed villages into enclaves. Turkish Cypriots state that the hostilities forced such an amalgamation while the Greek Cypriots state that the Turkish Cypriots did so without any pressure from them, but rather by the Turkish Cypriot paramilitary organization TMT so that to apply uniformity. It is believed by progressive Cypriots that both events occurred. Before long, a substantial portion of the island's Turkish Cypriot population was crowded into the Turkish quarter of Nicosia and other enclaves, in tents and hastily constructed shacks. Slum conditions resulted from the serious overcrowding.

Attempts of the Cypriot National Guard under control of General George Grivas, who claimed to be acting under a mandate given to Cyprus by the UN, to re-capture a beach-head at the Kokkina/Erenköy enclave which the Turkish Cypriots claimed was their last link with the outside world but the Greek Cypriots feared would be used as a landing post for Turkish mainland forces, caused an intervention by the Turkish Air Force. On 8 – 9 August, Turkey bombed the Tylliria area for two days, resulting in the death of 33 Greek Cypriots and 230 injuries.

Pierre Oberling noted that according to official sources, the 1963–64 crisis resulted in the death of 364 Turkish Cypriots and 174 Greek Cypriots. 209 Turkish Cypriots and 41 Greeks were reported as missing. Nearly 25,000 Turkish Cypriots, about one sixth of the Turkish Cypriot population at that time, had been forced to leave their homes to live into enclaves. Finally, more than 3000 Armenian ethnics who had been living in the areas of Nicosia that came under the control of Turkish paramilitaries were forced out of their homes.

== 1974: Coup d'etat and the Turkish invasion ==
With the coup d'état of 21 April 1967, Greece entered a period under the rule of the Colonels' Junta.

On 15 July 1974, the Republic of Cyprus government was overthrown by the Greek Cypriot national guard acting under orders from the Greek junta. The Greek junta installed an EOKA veteran and a member of the Cyprus Parliament, Nikos Sampson as the new president. The attempt to murder president Makarios failed, however, and he fled Cyprus with the help of the British army.

On 20 July 1974, in response to the coup, Turkish troops landed near Kyrenia, forcing a narrow corridor to Nicosia within 2 days, until a ceasefire was negotiated on 22 July. On the second day of the Turkish invasion of Cyprus the Colonels' Junta collapsed. Karamanlis returned from Paris and formed his civilian Government. In Cyprus, Nikos Sampson resigned and Glafkos Clerides took over the presidency as acting president, according to the 1960 Constitution.

In August of the same year, almost a month after the coup had dissolved the three guarantor powers, together with representatives of the two communities, met in Geneva. The Turkish Cypriots under Rauf Denktaş demanded a federal state with 34% of the territory ceded to Turkish Cypriots. Glafkos Klerides – the Greek Cypriot representative – asked for 36 to 48 hours in order to consult with his superiors. While still in talks, a second Turkish invasion was launched on Cyprus. When a ceasefire was declared, more than 36% of the territory was occupied by Turkish forces. The ceasefire line of 1974 today still separates the two communities and is generally referred to as the Green Line (or the 'Atilla Line'), and also runs through Nicosia, making it the only divided capital in the world.

The Turkish Army and the Greek side conducted policies of ethnic cleansing in their areas of control. Turkey was found guilty by the European Commission of Human Rights for displacement of persons, deprivation of liberty, ill treatment, deprivation of life and deprivation of possessions. The Turkish policy of violently forcing a third of the island's Greek population from their homes in the occupied North, preventing their return and settling Turks from the mainland there is considered an example of ethnic cleansing.

In 1976 and again in 1983, the European Commission of Human Rights found Turkey guilty of repeated violations of the European Convention of Human Rights. Turkey has been condemned for preventing the return of Greek Cypriot refugees to their properties. The European Commission of Human Rights reports of 1976 and 1983 state the following:

Having found violations of a number of Articles of the Convention, the Commission notes that the acts violating the Convention were exclusively directed against members of one of two communities in Cyprus, namely the Greek Cypriot community. It concludes by eleven votes to three that Turkey has thus failed to secure the rights and freedoms set forth in these Articles without discrimination on the grounds of ethnic origin, race, religion as required by Article 14 of the Convention.

Enclaved Greek Cypriots in the Karpass Peninsula in 1975 were subjected by the Turks to violations of their human rights so that by 2001 when the European Court of Human Rights found Turkey guilty of the violation of 14 articles of the European Convention of Human Rights in its judgement of Cyprus v. Turkey (application no. 25781/94), less than 600 still remained. In the same judgement, Turkey was found guilty of violating the rights of the Turkish Cypriots by authorising the trial of civilians by a military court.

The European commission of Human Rights with 12 votes against 1, accepted evidence from the Republic of Cyprus, concerning the rapes of various Greek-Cypriot women by Turkish soldiers and the torture of many Greek-Cypriot prisoners during the invasion of the island. The high rate of rape resulted in the temporary permission of abortion in Cyprus by the conservative Cypriot Orthodox Church. According to Paul Sant Cassia, rape was used systematically to "soften" resistance and clear civilian areas through fear. Many of the atrocities were seen as revenge for the atrocities against Turkish Cypriots in 1963–64 and the massacres during the first invasion. In the Karpass Peninsula, a group of Turkish Cypriots, called a "death squad", reportedly chose young girls to rape and impregnated teenage girls. There were cases of rapes, which included gang rapes, of teenage girls by Turkish soldiers and Turkish Cypriot men in the peninsula, and one case involved the rape of an old Greek Cypriot man by a Turkish Cypriot. The man was reportedly identified by the victim and two other rapists were also arrested. Raped women were sometimes outcast from society. Greek Cypriot EOKA-B militants committed a massacre in the village of Tochni, where all men between the ages of 13 and 74 were found shot (Tochni massacre). Likewise other mass graves were exhumed in the villages of Aloa, Sandalaris and Maratha, containing 126 dead civilians, including women and children (Maratha, Santalaris and Aloda massacre). There is also evidence of the rape of Greek Cypriot women by Turkish soldiers.

== Legal challenges ==
In 1976 and in 1983 Cyprus challenged Turkey at the European Court of Human Rights over a number of issues, including missing civilian Greek Cypriots, of which Cyprus claimed there were at least 1491. The ECHR concluded that there was a presumption that Turkey had a responsibility for clarifying the fate of civilians last known to be under its control, but also that there was "no proof that any of the missing persons were killed in circumstances for which [Turkey] could be held responsible; nor did the Commission find any evidence to the effect that any of the persons taken into custody were still being detained or kept in servitude by [Turkey]". A further 1994 case brought by Cyprus, on which judgement was made in 2001, concluded that Turkey continued to offer insufficient support in clarifying the fate of missing Cypriots. Another case is the book war crimes written by Andreas Parashos claiming at least 180 reported missings are fake and forged by Cyprus state, and 40 of them are already buried to the graves before 74, he also admitted^{Parashos ?} killing 100 Turkish Cypriot civilians A new case was brought in 2009, following comments by Turkish actor Atilla Olgac about committing war crimes during his service in Cyprus, although Olgac later retracted the remarks, saying he had been testing public reaction to a TV script.

In 2006, owing to the potential huge number of lawsuits against Turkey, the European Court of Human Rights called on Turkey in December to find "effective domestic remedies" for the mass displacement of Greek Cypriots. The result was a property commission established by the Turkish Cypriots purportedly offering right of return of Greek Cypriot properties so long as the property was unoccupied, or not in an area of military significance. A small number of applicants have received compensation. The Greek Cypriots have refused to recognise the commission as a proper means of redress, with some politicians going as far to suggest treason for those who accept. The European Court of Human Rights has ruled that the property commission does provide an adequate domestic remedy.

== See also ==
- Cyprus dispute
- Kokkina/Erenköy
- Loizidou v. Turkey
- Louroujina salient
- Operation Atilla
- List of massacres in Cyprus
