= List of massacres of Turkish people =

This is a list of Turkish massacres against

Turks and Muslims in the Ottoman Empire.

== List ==
Name	Date	Present location	Perpetrators	Deaths	Notes
Persecution of Muslims during the Ottoman contraction	c. 1820 to 1920	Former Ottoman territories and the Russian Empire	Various Christian forces or nation states in the Caucasus, Crimea, Southeastern Europe	Estimated up to around 5 to 5.5 million	Death estimates include non-Turkish people
Massacres of the Muslim population during the Russo-Turkish War	April 1877–March 1878	Balkans and Caucasus	Armies of the Russian Coalition, mainly Russian Army	250,000–600,000	Death estimates include non-Turkish people
Deportation of the Meskhetian Turks	14–15 November 1944	(Georgia (country)) Meskheti, Georgia	NKVD	12,589–50,000	
Buda massacre	September 1686	Buda, Hungary	Armies of the Holy League	+3,000	
Navarino massacre	19 August 1821	Pylos, Greece	Greek revolutionaries	3,000	
Tripolitsa massacre	23 September 1821	Tripoli, Greece	Greek revolutionaries	6,000–30,000	
Galați massacre	20 February 1821	Galați, Romania	Greek revolutionaries	50–300	
Massacres of the Turkish population during the April Uprising	April–May 1876	Bulgaria	Bulgarian revolutionaries	200–1,000	
Harmanli massacre	16–17 January 1878	Harmanli, Bulgaria	Russian Army	2,000–5,000	
Kızanlık massacres	1877–1878	Kazanlak, Bulgaria	Russian Army, Bulgarians	1,751	
Lasithi massacres	1897	Crete, Greece	Christian mobs	850–1,000	
Sarakina massacre	February 1897	Crete, Greece	Christian mobs	104 (61 children, 23 women and 20 men)	
Sitia massacre	February 1897	Sitia, Crete, Greece	Christian mob	300	
Kissamos massacre	February 1897	Kissamos, Crete, Greece	Christian mob	23	
Kirchova massacre	August 1903	Kichevo, North Macedonia	Bulgarian revolutionaries	8	
Raionovo, Planitsa and Kukurtevo massacres	Autumn 1912	(North Macedonia) Raionovo, Planitsa and Kukurtevo, Macedonia	Bulgarian irregulars	+700	
Cisr-i Mustafapaşa massacre	October 1912	Svilengrad, Bulgaria	Bulgarians	200	
Edeköy massacre	1912	Edeköy, Edirne, Turkey	Greeks	1,659	
Serres massacre	1912	Serres, Greece	Bulgarians	600	
Dedeagac massacre	1912	Alexandroupolis, Greece	Armenians	20	
Bulgarian school massacre	1912	Chair quarter of Uskub, North Macedonia	Serbians	18	
Ohrid massacre	1912	Ohrid, North Macedonia	Serbians	500	
Strumica massacre	1912	Strumitsa, North Macedonia	Greeks	3,000	
Petrovo massacre	1912	(Bulgaria) Petrovo	Bulgarians	"every living Turkish thing"	
Yaylacık massacre	1912	(Greece) Yaylacık, close to Salonica	Greeks	15	
Salonica massacre	1912	(Greece) Salonica	Greeks	27	
Derin Çatak massacre	1912	(Turkey) Malkara	Bulgarians	11	
Avrethisar villages massacre	1912–1913	(Greece) Kilkis	Bulgarians	451	
Pravishte massacres	1912–1913	(Greece) Eleftheroupoli	Greeks	195	
Kaz massacre	March 1913	(Turkey) Yukarı Kılıçlı	Bulgarians	43	
Karasatı massacre	June 1913	(Turkey) Karasatı, Keşan	Bulgarians and Greeks	29	
Uzunköprü massacre	July 1913	(Turkey) Uzunköprü	Bulgarians	42	
Habibçe massacre	July 1913	(Bulgaria) Lyubimets	Bulgarians	20	
Greek landing at Smyrna	15 May 1919	(Turkey) İzmir	Hellenic Army and local Greeks	400–600	
Yeşiloba massacre	11 June 1920	(Turkey) Yeşiloba, Adana	French Armenian Legion	64–200	
Menemen massacre	17 June 1919	(Turkey) Menemen, İzmir	Hellenic Army and local Greeks	200	
Massacre in Erbeyli	20–21 June 1919	(Turkey) Erbeyli, Aydın	Hellenic Army	72	
Birecik massacre	11–24 February 1920	(Turkey) Birecik, Şanlıurfa	French Army	280	
Massacre in Marash	1920	(Turkey) Marash	French Army and French Armenian Legion	4,500	
Massacre in Aintab	1920–1921	(Turkey) Aintab	French Army and French Armenian Legion	6,000–7,000	
Yalova Peninsula massacres	1920–1921	(Turkey) Armutlu Peninsula	Hellenic Army, local Christians and Circassians	5,500–9,100	
Bilecik massacre	March–April 1921	(Turkey) Bilecik, Sögüt, Bozüyük	Hellenic Army and local Greeks	208	
İzmit massacre	24 June 1921	(Turkey) İzmit	Hellenic Army	300	
Karatepe village massacre	14 February 1922	(Turkey) Karatepe, Köşk	Hellenic Army	385	
Uşak massacre	1 September 1922	(Turkey) Uşak	Hellenic Army and local Greeks	200	
Alaşehir massacre	3–4 September 1922	(Turkey) Alaşehir, Manisa	Hellenic Army	3,000	
Turgutlu massacre	4–6 September 1922	(Turkey) Turgutlu, Manisa	Hellenic Army	1,000	
Salihli massacre	5 September 1922	(Turkey) Salihli, Manisa	Hellenic Army	+76	
Manisa massacre	6–7 September 1922	(Turkey) Manisa	Hellenic Army and local Christians	4,355	
Suşiçe massacre	April 1941	(North Macedonia) Sušica	Kingdom of Bulgaria	7	
Blatec executions	September 1944	(North Macedonia) Blatec	Kingdom of Bulgaria	15	
Istibanje-Teranci massacres	October 1944	(North Macedonia) Istibanja and Teranci	Nazi Germany	17	
Limassol massacre	13 February 1963	Limassol, Cyprus	Greek Cypriots	16	
Bloody Christmas	21–31 December 1963	Nicosia, Cyprus	Greek Cypriots	364	
Massacre in Famagusta	11 May 1964	Famagusta, Cyprus	Cypriot Police	10–17	
Massacre in Akrotiri and Dhekelia	13 May 1964	(United Kingdom) Akrotiri and Dhekelia	Cypriot Police and local Cypriots	11	
Massacre in Kofinou	14–15 November 1967	Kofinou, Cyprus	Greek Cypriots	26	
Alaminos massacre	20 July 1974	Alaminos, Cyprus	Cypriot National Guard	13–14	
Maratha, Santalaris and Aloda massacre	14 August 1974	Maratha, Santalaris and Aloda, Cyprus	EOKA B	126	
Tochni massacre	15 August 1974	Taşkent, Cyprus	EOKA B	84	
Fergana massacre	3–12 June 1989	Fergana valley, Uzbekistan	Uzbek mobs	97	
Bulgarization of Turks in People's Republic of Bulgaria	1984–1989	Bulgaria	Bulgarian army	300 to 1,500 (according to HRW)	
Çetinkaya massacre	25 December 1991	Istanbul, Turkey	Kurdistan Workers' Party	12	
Bingöl massacre	24 May 1993	Bingöl, Turkey	Kurdistan Workers' Party	38	
Başbağlar massacre	5 July 1993	Başbağlar, Turkey	Kurdistan Workers' Party	33	
Yavi massacre	25 October 1993	Erzurum, Turkey	Kurdistan Workers' Party	33	
Blue market massacre	13 March 1999	Istanbul, Turkey	Kurdistan Workers' Party	13	

== See also ==
- List of massacres in Cyprus
- List of massacres in Turkey
- List of massacres of Azerbaijanis

== Bibliography ==
- Anderson, Liam D.; Stansfield, Gareth R. V. (2009), Crisis in Kirkuk: The Ethnopolitics of Conflict and Compromise, University of Pennsylvania Press, ISBN 978-0-8122-4176-1
- Feldman, David; Volovici, Marc, eds. (2023). Antisemitism, Islamophobia and the Politics of Definition. Palgrave Critical Studies of Antisemitism and Racism. Palgrave Macmillan Cham. doi:10.1007/978-3-031-16266-4. ISBN 978-3-031-16265-7.
  - Anscombe, Frederick F. "Attitudes to Islam and Muslims in the Christian Balkans". In Feldman & Volovici (2023), pp. 41-66. doi:10.1007/978-3-031-16266-4_3
- Gibney, Matthew J.; Hansen, Randall, eds. (2005). Immigration and asylum: from 1900 to the present. ABC-CLIO. ISBN 9781576077962.
  - Fábos, Anita. "Muslim Immigration". In Gibney & Hansen (2005), pp. 434–440.
- Kaser, Karl (2011). The Balkans and the Near East: Introduction to a Shared History. Berlin Wien: LIT Verlag Münster. ISBN 978-3-643-50190-5.
