= Maratha, Santalaris and Aloda massacre =

Massacres of Turkish Cypriots by Greeks and Greek Cypriots

Coordinates: 35°12′40″N 33°48′00″E

- Part of atrocities against Turkish Cypriots during the Turkish invasion of Cyprus
- Dead bodies of Turkish Cypriot civilians at Sandallar (Santalaris).

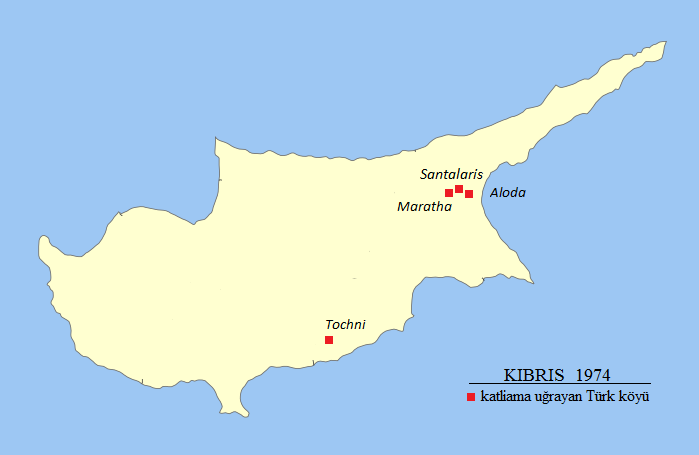
- Locations of massacres against Turkish Cypriots in 1974
- Location: Maratha, Santalaris, Aloda in Cyprus
- Date: 14 August 1974; 52 years ago
- Target: Turkish Cypriot civilians
- Weapons: Machine guns, sharp tools
- Deaths: 126
- Perpetrator: EOKA B
- Motive: Anti-Turkish sentiment, Hellenization

Maratha, Santalaris and Aloda massacre (Turkish: Muratağa, Sandallar ve Atlılar katliamı) refers to a massacre of Turkish Cypriots by EOKA-B; a Greek Cypriot paramilitary group that took place on 14 August 1974 in the villages of Maratha, Santalaris and Aloda. In the massacre, a total of 126 unarmed innocent Turkish Cypriots were killed, with the youngest being 16 days old and the oldest 95 years old.

== Background ==
According to the 1960 census, the inhabitants of the three villages were entirely Turkish Cypriots. The total population of Maratha and Santalaris was 207. By 1973, the total population of the villages had risen to 270, with 124 in Maratha, 100 in Santalaris and 46 in Aloda. However, in July 1974, following the first Turkish invasion of Cyprus, all men of fighting age were taken away as prisoners of war to internment camps in Famagusta and from there transferred to Limassol. The Turkish Invasion of Cyprus started in response to a Greek junta-sponsored Cypriot coup d'état five days earlier, it led to the Turkish capture and occupation of the northern part of the island. On 2 July 1974, Makarios wrote an open letter to President Gizikis complaining bluntly that 'cadres of the Greek military regime support and direct the activities of the "EOKA-B" terrorist organisation'.

== Massacre ==
On 20 July 1974, the men of the villages were arrested by EOKA-B and sent to Limassol. Following this, according to testimonials cited by Sevgül Uludağ, EOKA-B men from the neighboring village of Peristeronopigi came, got drunk in the camp they established in the village coffeehouse, fired shots in the air, and subsequently raped many women and young girls; this continued until 14 August 1974. Upon the launch of the second invasion of the Turkish Army, they decided not to leave behind any witnesses and killed the entire population of the villages present at the time.

Two Greek witnesses also described the massacre, stating: "The only Turk the EOKA-B members did not send to the prison camp was the coffee shop owner who had been providing them with information. However, they also sexually harassed his daughter. When he objected, they killed him as well. At dawn on 14 August, when news arrived that the Turks were advancing on Maraş, the palikaryas (Note: Palikarya is a Greek term meaning "young man," "lad," or "brave young man." In the context of the Cyprus conflict, it refers to Greek Cypriot armed militants, including members of EOKA-B.) did not know what to do. They decided they had to cover up the murders they had committed, telling the women and children of the village that they would take them to Famagusta for their protection, they put them on buses. They stopped the buses in deserted places, made the women and children get off, and massacred them."

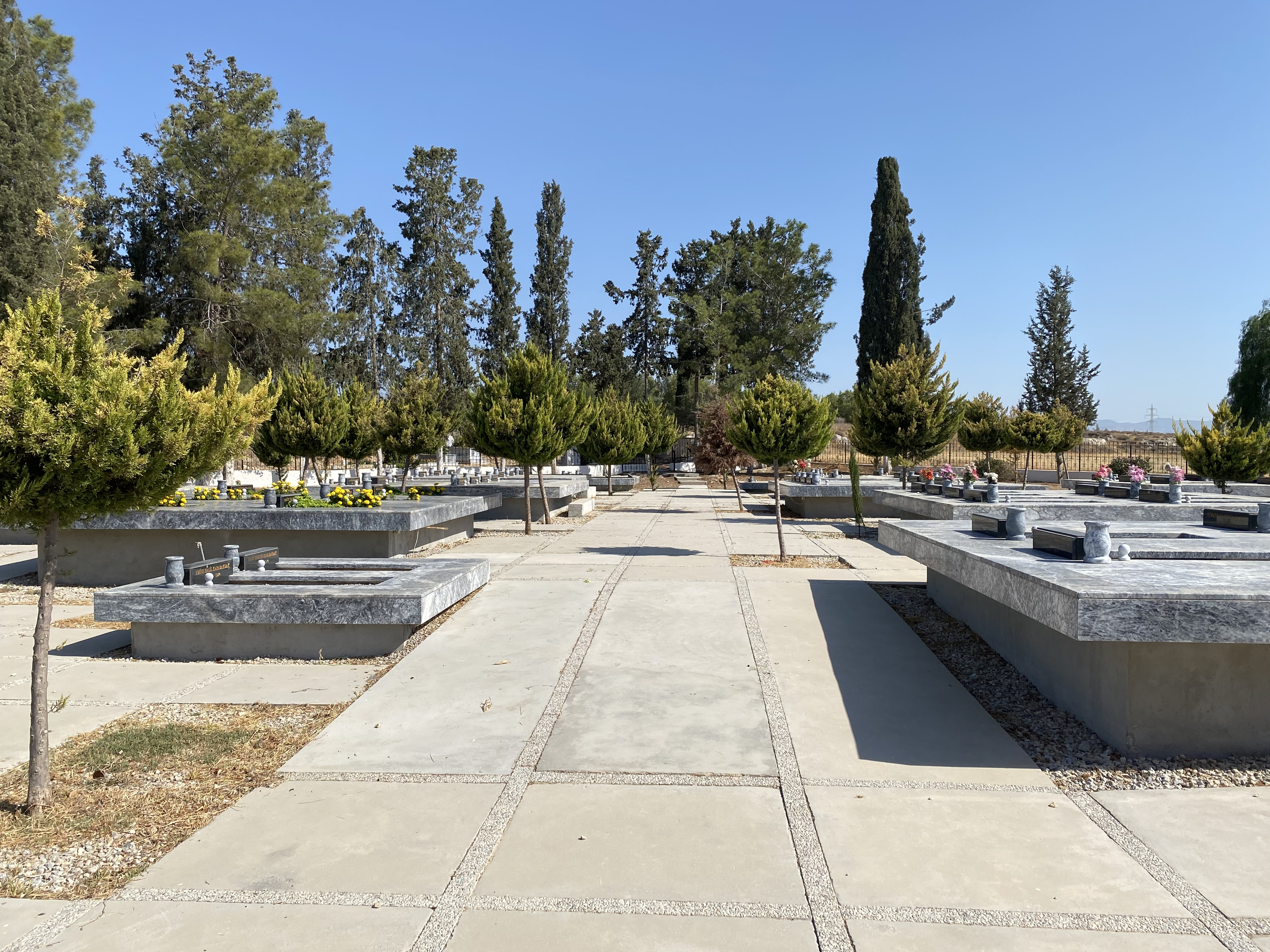
Cemetery where the victims are buried in Maratha. Since the 2010s, the remains of those buried in the Maratha mass grave have been excavated and are being buried individually.

In Maratha and Santalaris, 84-89 were killed. The Turkish imam of Maratha stated that there were 90 people in the village prior to the massacre, and only six people were left. Elderly people and children were also killed during the massacre. Only three people were able to escape from the massacre in Aloda. The inhabitants of the three villages were buried in mass graves in a pit used as a rubbish dump with a bulldozer. The villagers of Maratha and Santalaris were buried in the same grave.

Associated Press described the corpses as "so battered and decomposed that they crumbled to pieces when soldiers lifted them from the rubbish with shovels". Milliyet reported that parts of the bodies had been chopped off and sharp tools, as well as machine guns had been used in the massacre.

According to Greek Cypriot writer and researcher Tony Angastiniotis, at least one of the attackers used a mainland Greek accent, which suggested that he was a Greek officer.

== Reactions and aftermath ==
=== Discovery of mass graves ===
According to the testimony of Nikos Genias, a Greek Cypriot soldier, published in the daily newspaper Haravgi on 20 July 1998, EOKA-B members reportedly used excavators to bury the elderly and children they had killed in the three Turkish Cypriot villages. Genias recalled that one of the perpetrators boasted, "We completed our job."

The mass graves were discovered on 1–2 September 1974. The mass grave in the village of Atlılar was discovered earlier than the one in Muratağa, on 20 August. A shepherd spotted the mass grave in Muratağa after noticing a hand protruding from the ground. Subsequently, soldiers from the 28th Mechanized Infantry Division began excavating the site to uncover the pit. Swedish soldiers serving with the United Nations Peacekeeping Force also observed the excavation. On 2 September 1974, the first day of the excavation, 44 bodies were recovered from the mass grave.

At approximately 20:50 TRT on 1 September, the Turkish Press Attaché’s Office in Nicosia officially confirmed the massacre. The remaining mass graves were exhumed in the presence of foreign press representatives. United Press International described the exhumation work as follows: "New pits and dozens of bodies are being found every hour; it is very difficult to bear witness to the work."

=== Reactions ===
According to Turkish sources, John Akass of The Sun, who witnessed the exhumation of the graves, described the massacre as an atrocity. The discovery of the mass grave in Atlılar on 20 August 1974 was reported by sources such as the The Times and The Guardian which covered the massacre on its front page. Journalists were taken to the mass graves by Turkish military personnel in the region. A briefing on the matter was also given in Ankara by Orhan Birgit, the Minister of Tourism; Turkish officials stated in their statements that there were 57 bodies in the mass grave. United Press International and the BBC also witnessed the exhumation of the graves and carried related reports. The New York Times began reporting on the massacre from 3 September onwards. On 30 July 1974, following the discovery of the Atlılar mass grave, Die Zeit stated: "The massacre of Turks in the Baf and Famagusta regions was the reason for the Turks' second military intervention in August."

Rauf Denktaş, put off a meeting with the Greeks upon hearing the news of the massacre. Denktaş made the following statement regarding the massacre:

Attempting to resolve the Cyprus problem by killing Turks was a futile endeavour.

Some of the bodies exhumed from Muratağa were laid to rest with a religious ceremony on 3 September 1974. The massacre sparked widespread outrage in the Turkish-controlled part of the island and mainland Turkey. Hundreds of Greek Cypriot prisoners of war were brutally tortured in retaliation for the massacre and many were executed. The Autonomous Turkish Cypriot Administration held an emergency meeting following the discovery of the mass graves, while Turkish Cypriot newspapers extensively covered the massacre. Yılmaz Alpaslan, member of the Turkish Grand National Assembly for the Republican People's Party, raised the issue of the massacre at a meeting of the Commission on Population and Development held in Paris. The Turkish Red Crescent protested the massacre by writing a letter to the International Committee of the Red Cross.

When the massacre came to light in 1974, the Greek Cypriots did not acknowledge responsibility. In a statement broadcast on state radio, whilst the massacre was not denied, it was noted that many Greek Cypriots were also missing in the region, and it was suggested that the bodies found in the mass grave might belong to Greek Cypriots. In response to these allegations, Denktaş stated: "However much the Greeks may have rendered the bodies of the Turks they left behind unrecognisable, there remain signs on them that will confirm their identities. We shall show these to the Greeks, who, in their panic, are spreading preposterous lies." Glafkos Klerides stated on 4 September 1974 that the Government of the Republic of Cyprus had "seized hundreds of weapons from Greeks who had illegally armed themselves in recent days". The Turkish press reported that the Greek Government did not want news of the massacre to be published in Greece; consequently, pressure was exerted on the press, and no reports on the matter were published.

In a letter sent to the United Nations, Turkey described the massacre as "an even greater crime against humanity committed by Greek and Greek Orthodox aggressors". William Richard Mead claimed that the United Nations also bears responsibility for the massacre, as it failed to take preventive action.

=== Publications and research ===
Greek Cypriot writer and researcher Tony Angastiniyotis produced a documentary about the massacre entitled Voice of Blood. Whilst the documentary received a positive response from Turks, it provoked very strong reactions from Greeks. The Muratağa, Atlılar and Sandallar Martyrs Memorial Association, meanwhile, has published a book on the massacre entitled 1955–74: Step by Step Genocide – Muratağa, Atlılar, Sandallar.

=== Further exhumations and individual burials ===
Two mass graves, containing the remains of 126 people from the villages of Muratağa, Sandallar and Atlılar, were exhumed in 2015 as part of the work carried out by the bi-communal Committee on Missing Persons. It was announced that, as part of this work, those killed in the massacre would be identified via DNA and given proper burials in accordance with human rights standards. During the exhumation process, carried out by four archaeologists, the area surrounding the memorial was first cordoned off and the marble slabs covering the mass grave were broken up. Prior to this date, those killed in the massacre had officially been listed as missing persons.

On 6 September 2018, a funeral ceremony was held for 12 identified individuals; with their burial, the total number of people buried individually reached 20. On 7 October 2019, a further 21 victims of the massacre were buried in a state ceremony.

On 26 December 2020, 14 children who had been killed in the massacre and whose identities had been established were buried. The youngest of the children buried was four-month-old Hayriye Arif, and the oldest was 15-year-old Ayşe Hasan.

=== Investigation and legal proceedings ===
In 2012, 63 relatives of 126 Turkish Cypriots killed as a result of the massacre lodged an application against the Republic of Cyprus to the European Court of Human Rights on the basis of their claim that an effective investigation had not been carried out by the authorities, who also failed to inform them about this process sufficiently. According to the information submitted to the ECHR, the Cypriot authorities had initiated a police investigation in September 2009 following press reports identifying alleged perpetrators. On 23 September 2014, the ECHR concluded it was premature to say that the investigation had not been efficient since the authorities had taken substantial steps in identifying perpetrators and collecting evidence.

== Commemoration ==
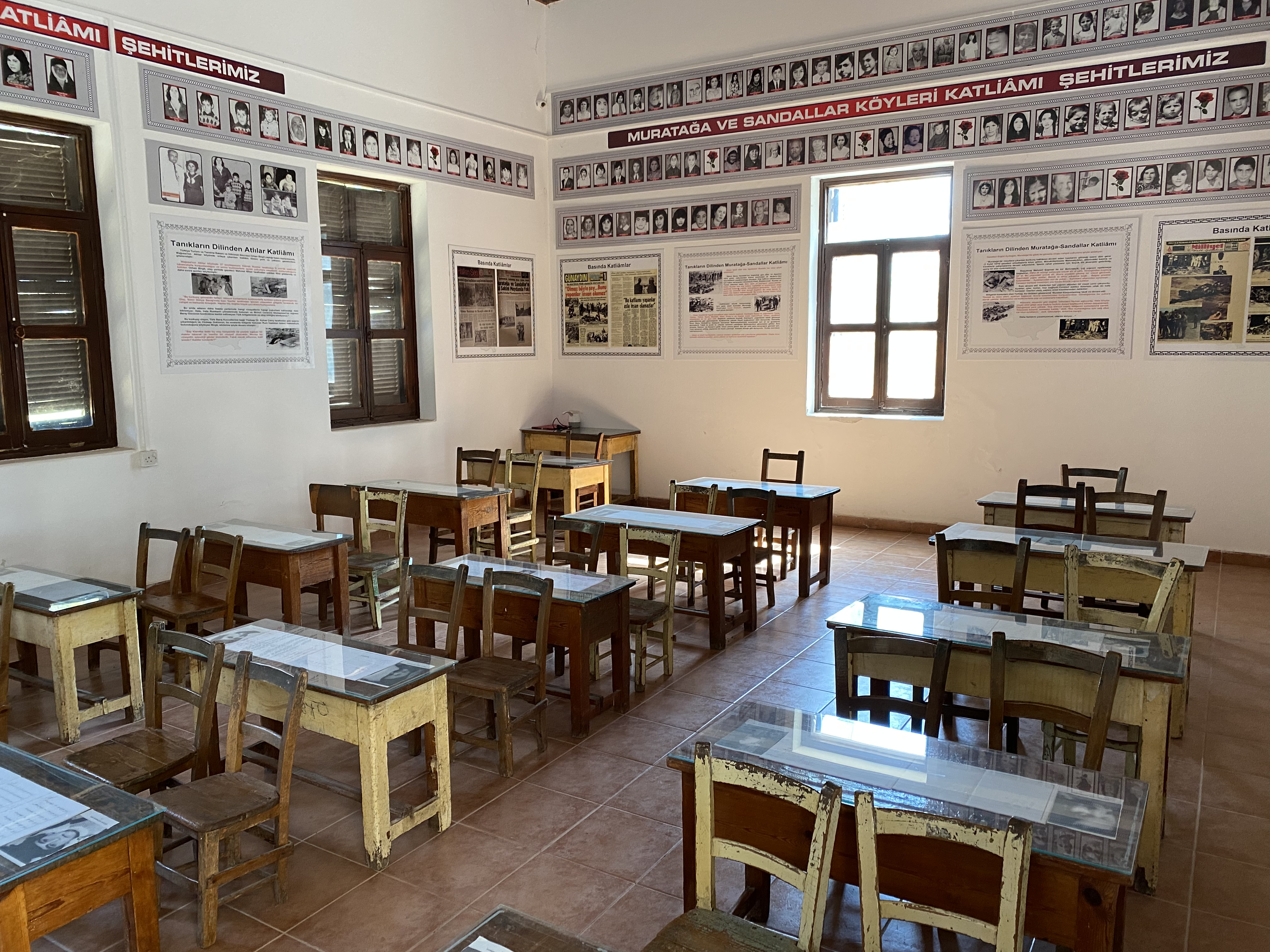
The primary school building in Santalaris is now used as a museum to commemorate the victims of the massacre. Each empty chair symbolises one child killed in the massacre.

=== Turkish Cypriot community ===
An association named the "Muratağa, Atlılar and Sandallar Martyrs Memorial Association" was established in memory of the massacre. Based on accounts provided by survivors, the association claims that the identities of approximately 30 alleged perpetrators have been established. In 2010, following pressure from the European Court of Human Rights, the Republic of Cyprus Police and the Turkish Cypriot police jointly launched an investigation into the events that took place in 1963 and 1974, including the massacre. Today, the villages of Muratağa, Sandallar and Atlılar are also referred to as the "Martyrs" villages. Two martyrs' cemeteries have been built for those killed in the massacre. The bodies were transferred to these cemeteries after being found, and the cemeteries took on their present form in 1980 with the construction of surrounding walls. There is also a museum on the site.

=== Greek Cypriot community ===
Niyazi Kızılyürek describes the massacre that took place in three villages, along with the Tochni massacre, as a subject that the Greek Cypriot community "shies away from confronting" and "does not wish to discuss". According to Kızılyürek, "The few conscientious journalists and intellectuals who attempt to raise the issue are sought to be silenced outright with this clichéd response: "The murders were committed by a few irresponsible fanatics; these cannot be attributed to the Greek Cypriot community." Kızılyürek also states that the identities of the perpetrators of the massacre are known within the Greek Cypriot community and that not a single one of them has made a statement expressing remorse. In the context of research for the book A History of Resentment and Violence, a perpetrator named M., who was contacted in 2014, stated: "In my eyes, they were not human beings but stones. I fired at the stones, not at people. I have no regrets.

The first commemoration of the victims of the massacre by a Greek Cypriot political party was carried out by AKEL, which visited their graves and laid flowers on 9 September 2015. In an article on the subject, AKEL MP Eleni Mavrou wrote that both communities teach children in their schools only about what has happened to their own people. No comments were received from any other Greek Cypriot political parties regarding AKEL's visit. Aristos Mihailidis, a nationalist columnist writing in the Phileleftheros newspaper, argued that these "incidents", carried out by "a few fanatical Greek Cypriots", "cannot be compared to the massacres perpetrated by the occupying Turkish army against Greek Cypriots".

Erato Kozakou-Marcoullis, who served as Minister for Foreign Affairs of the Republic of Cyprus between 2007 to 2008 and from 2011 to 2013, stated in a message posted on her social media account in 2016: "I apologise to the Turkish Cypriots for the 126 women and children killed in Atlılar, Muratağa and Sandallar, and the 85 civilian men killed in Taşkent."

== See also ==
- List of massacres in Cyprus
- List of massacres of Turkish people
- Bloody Christmas (1963)
- Tochni massacre
- Alaminos massacre
