= Turkish invasion of Cyprus =

1974 military conflict

- Part of the Cold War and Cyprus problem
- Ethnic map of Cyprus in 1973. Gold denotes Greek Cypriots, purple denotes Turkish Cypriot enclaves and red denotes British sovereign bases.
Date	20 July – 18 August 1974 (4 weeks and 1 day)
Location	Cyprus
Result	Turkish victory; Cypriot and Greek military juntas collapse on 23 July and 24 July 1974; 200,000 Greek Cypriots displaced; 50,000 Turkish Cypriots moved to the north after the Third Vienna Agreement with the aid of the UNFICYP
Territorial changes	Turkey occupies 36.2% of Cyprus; Formation of the Autonomous Turkish Cypriot Administration

Belligerents
Turkey; (Turkey) Turkish Resistance Organisation	Cypriot Junta (until July 23); Cyprus (after July 23); EOKA B; Greece (until July 24)

Commanders and leaders
(Turkey) Fahri Korutürk; (Turkey) Bülent Ecevit; (Turkey) Necmettin Erbakan; (Turkey) Rauf Denktaş	Nikos Sampson; (Cyprus) Glafcos Clerides; Athanasios Sklavenitis; (Greece) Dimitrios Ioannidis; (Greece) Phaedon Gizikis

Strength
Turkey: 40,000 troops 160–180 M47 and M48 tanks; Turkish Cypriot enclaves: 11,000–13,500 men, up to 20,000 under full mobilisation; Total: 60,000	Cyprus: 12,000; Small number of T-34 tanks; Greece: 1,800–2,000; Total: 14,000

Casualties and losses
1,500–3,500 casualties (estimated) (military and civilian) including 568 KIA (498 TAF, 70 Resistance); 2,000 wounded 270 civilians killed 803 civilians missing (official number in 1974)	4,500–6,000 casualties (estimated) (military and civilian) including 309 (Cyprus) and 105 (Greece) military deaths 1,000–1,100 missing (as of 2015)
- (United Nations) UNFICYP: 9 killed 65 wounded

Turkey invaded Cyprus (Note: In Greek, the invasion is known as "Τουρκική εισβολή στην Κύπρο" (Tourkikí eisvolí stin Kýpro). Among Turkish speakers the operation is also referred as Cyprus Peace Operation (Kıbrıs Barış Harekâtı) or Operation Peace (Barış Harekâtı), based on the viewpoint that Turkey's military action constituted a peacekeeping operation. It is also referred to as Cyprus Operation (Kıbrıs Harekâtı) and Cyprus Intervention (Kıbrıs Meselesi). The operation was code-named by Turkey as Operation Atilla (Turkish: Atilla Harekâtı).) on 20 July 1974 in an operation that progressed in two phases over the following month. Taking place upon a background of intercommunal violence between Greek and Turkish Cypriots, and in response to a Greek junta-sponsored Cypriot coup d'état five days earlier, it led to the Turkish capture and occupation of the northern part of the island.

The coup was ordered by the military junta in Greece and staged by the Cypriot National Guard in conjunction with EOKA B. It deposed the Cypriot president Archbishop Makarios III and installed Nikos Sampson. The aim of the coup was the union (enosis) of Cyprus with Greece, and the Hellenic Republic of Cyprus to be declared.

Turkish forces landed in Cyprus on 20 July and captured 3% of the island before a ceasefire was declared. The Greek military junta collapsed and was replaced by a civilian government. Following the breakdown of peace talks, Turkish forces enlarged their original beachhead in August 1974 resulting in the capture of approximately 36% of the island. The ceasefire line from August 1974 became the United Nations Buffer Zone in Cyprus and is commonly referred to as the Green Line.

Around 150,000 people (amounting to more than one-quarter of the total population of Cyprus, and to one-third of its Greek Cypriot population) were displaced from the northern part of the island, where Greek Cypriots had constituted 80% of the population. Over the course of the next year, roughly 60,000 Turkish Cypriots, amounting to half the Turkish Cypriot population, were moved from the south to the north after the Third Vienna Agreement and with the aid of the UNFICYP.

The invasion and its aftermath is considered a case of ethnic cleansing. In addition, Turkey subsequently supplemented the Turkish Cypriot population with settlers from Turkey, a process that some scholars characterize as a form of settler colonialism, albeit in a hybrid and non-classical form.

The Turkish invasion ended in the partition of Cyprus along the UN-monitored Green Line, which still divides Cyprus, and the formation of a de facto Autonomous Turkish Cypriot Administration in the north. In 1983, the Turkish Republic of Northern Cyprus (TRNC) declared independence, although Turkey is the only country that recognises it. The international community considers the TRNC's territory as Turkish-occupied territory of the Republic of Cyprus. The occupation is viewed as illegal under international law, amounting to illegal occupation of European Union territory since Cyprus became a member.

== Background ==
=== Ottoman and British rule ===
In 1571 the mostly Greek-populated island of Cyprus was conquered by the Ottoman Empire, during the Ottoman–Venetian War (1570–1573). After 300 years of Ottoman rule the island and its population was leased to Britain by the Cyprus Convention, an agreement reached during the Congress of Berlin in 1878 between the United Kingdom and the Ottoman Empire. On 5 November 1914, in response to the Ottoman Empire's entry into the First World War on the side of the Central Powers, the United Kingdom formally declared Cyprus (together with Egypt and Sudan) a protectorate of the British Empire and later a Crown colony, known as British Cyprus. Article 20 of the Treaty of Lausanne in 1923 marked the end of the Turkish claim to the island. Article 21 of the treaty gave Turkish nationals ordinarily resident in Cyprus the choice of leaving the island within 2 years or to remain as British subjects.

At this time the population of Cyprus was composed of both Greeks and Turks, who identified themselves with their respective homeland. Greek and Turkish Cypriots lived quietly side by side for many years.

Formal education was perhaps the most important as it affected Cypriots during childhood and youth; education has been a main vehicle of transferring inter-communal hostility.

British colonial policies, such as the known principle of "divide and rule", promoted ethnic polarisation as a strategy to reduce the threat to colonial control. For example, when Greek Cypriots rebelled in the 1950s, the Colonial Office expanded the size of the Auxiliary Police and in September 1955, established the Special Mobile Reserve which was made up exclusively of Turkish Cypriots, to combat EOKA.

=== 1950s ===
In the early 1950s, a Greek nationalist group was formed called the Ethniki Organosis Kyprion Agoniston (EOKA, or "National Organisation of Cypriot Fighters"). Their objective was to break free from the British first, and then to integrate the island with Greece. EOKA wished to remove all obstacles from their path to independence, or union with Greece.

The first secret talks for EOKA, as a nationalist organisation established to integrate the island with Greece, were started under the chairmanship of Archbishop Makarios III in Athens on 2 July 1952. In the aftermath of these meetings a "Council of Revolution" was established on 7 March 1953. In early 1954 secret weaponry shipments to Cyprus started with the knowledge of the Greek government. Lt. Georgios Grivas "Digenis", formerly an officer in the Greek army, covertly disembarked on the island on 9 November 1954 and EOKA's campaign against the British forces began to grow.

The first Turk to be killed by EOKA on 21 June 1955 was a policeman. EOKA also killed Greek Cypriot leftist members of the KKK (Cyprus Communist Party). After the September 1955 Istanbul Pogrom, EOKA started its activity against Turkish Cypriots.

A year later EOKA revived its attempts to achieve the union of Cyprus with Greece. Turkish Cypriots were recruited into the police by the British forces to fight against Greek Cypriots, but EOKA initially did not want to open up a second front against Turkish Cypriots. However, in January 1957, EOKA forces began targeting and killing Turkish Cypriot police deliberately to provoke Turkish Cypriot riots in Nicosia, which diverted the British army's attention away from their positions in the mountains. In the riots, at least one Greek Cypriot was killed, which was presented by the Greek Cypriot leadership as an act of Turkish aggression.

The Turkish Resistance Organisation (TMT, Türk Mukavemet Teşkilatı) was formed initially as a local initiative to prevent the union with Greece which was viewed by Turkish Cypriots as an existential threat due to the exodus of Cretan Turks from Crete once the union with Greece was achieved. It was later supported and organised directly by the Turkish government, and the TMT declared war on the Greek Cypriot rebels as well.

On 12 June 1958, eight Greek Cypriot men from Kondemenos village, who were arrested by the British police as part of an armed group suspected of preparing an attack against the Turkish Cypriot quarter of Skylloura, were killed by the TMT near the Turkish Cypriot populated village of Gönyeli, after being dropped off there by the British authorities. TMT also blew up the offices of the Turkish press office in Nicosia in a false flag operation to attach blame to Greek Cypriots. It also began a string of assassinations of prominent Turkish Cypriot supporters of independence. The following year, after the conclusion of the independence agreements on Cyprus, the Turkish Navy sent a ship to Cyprus fully loaded with arms for the TMT. The ship was stopped and the crew was caught red-handed in the infamous "Deniz incident".

=== 1960–1963 ===
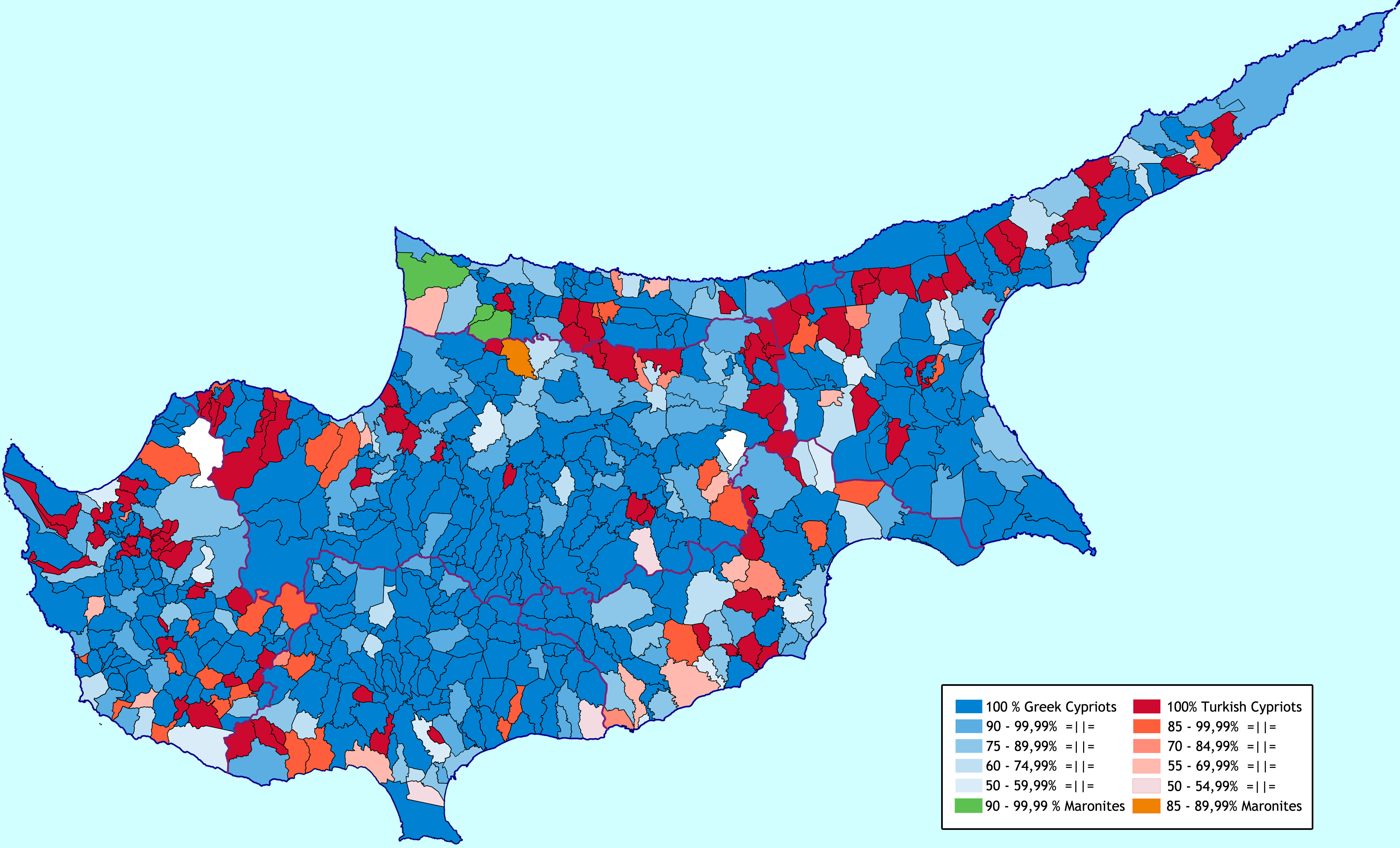
Ethnic map of Cyprus according to the 1960 census

British rule lasted until the middle of August 1960, when the island was declared an independent state on the basis of the London and Zürich Agreements of the previous year.

The 1960 Constitution of the Cyprus Republic proved unworkable, however, lasting only three years. Greek Cypriots wanted to end the separate Turkish Cypriot municipal councils permitted by the British in 1958, made subject to review under the 1960 agreements. For many Greek Cypriots these municipalities were the first stage on the way to the partition they feared. The Greek Cypriots wanted enosis, integration with Greece, while Turkish Cypriots wanted taksim, partition between Greece and Turkey.

Resentment also rose within the Greek Cypriot community because Turkish Cypriots had been given a larger share of governmental posts than the size of their population warranted. In accordance with the constitution 30% of civil service jobs were allocated to the Turkish community despite being only 18.3% of the population. Additionally, the position of vice president was reserved for the Turkish population, and both the president and vice president were given veto power over crucial issues.

=== 1963–1974 ===
In December 1963, the President of the Republic Makarios proposed thirteen constitutional amendments after the government was blocked by Turkish Cypriot legislators. Frustrated by these impasses and believing that the constitution prevented enosis, the Greek Cypriot leadership believed that the rights given to Turkish Cypriots under the 1960 constitution were too extensive and had designed the Akritas plan, which was aimed at reforming the constitution in favour of Greek Cypriots, persuading the international community about the correctness of the changes and violently subjugating Turkish Cypriots in a few days should they not accept the plan. The amendments would have involved the Turkish community giving up many of their protections as a minority, including adjusting ethnic quotas in the government and revoking the presidential and vice-presidential veto power.

These amendments were rejected by the Turkish side and the Turkish representation left the government, although there is some dispute over whether they left in protest or were forced out by the National Guard. The 1960 constitution fell apart and communal violence erupted on 21 December 1963, when two Turkish Cypriots were killed at an incident involving the Greek Cypriot police. Both President Makarios and Vice President Küçük issued calls for peace, but these were ignored. Greece, Turkey, and the UK – the guarantors of the Zürich and London Agreements that had led to Cyprus' independence – wanted to send a NATO force to the island under the command of General Peter Young.

Within a week of the violence flaring up, the Turkish army contingent had moved out of its barracks and seized the most strategic position on the island across the Nicosia–Kyrenia road, the historic jugular vein of the island. They retained control of that road until 1974, at which time it acted as a crucial link in Turkey's military invasion. From 1963 up to the point of the Turkish invasion of 20 July 1974, Greek Cypriots who wanted to use the road could only do so if accompanied by a UN convoy.

700 Turkish residents of northern Nicosia, among them women and children, were taken hostage. The violence resulted in the death of 364 Turkish and 174 Greek Cypriots, destruction of 109 Turkish Cypriot or mixed villages and displacement of 25,000–30,000 Turkish Cypriots. The British Daily Telegraph later called it an "anti Turkish pogrom". A doomed truce was declared on 26 December 1963 and a British peacekeeping despatched to oversee it.

In January 1964, negotiations were hosted by the British in London but their failure to make headway, and two vetoes thereafter by Makarios of a suggested NATO or NATO-dominated peacekeeping force, meant matters were turned over to the United Nations. After intense debate, UN Security Council Resolution 186, unanimously adopted on 4 March, recommended the creation of a UN peacekeeping force (United Nations Force in Cyprus, UNFICYP) and the designation of a UN mediator.

Violence by the militias of both sides had continued, and Turkey made several threats to invade. Indeed, Ankara had decided to do so when, in his famous letter of 5 June 1964, President Johnson of the United States warned that his country was against an invasion, making a veiled threat that NATO would not aid Turkey if its invasion of Cyprus led to a conflict with the Soviet Union. More generally, although Resolution 186 had asked all countries to avoid interfering in Cypriot affairs, the United States disregarded this and, through persistent machinations, managed to overcome manoeuvring by Makarios and protests by the Soviet Union to intimately involve itself in negotiations in the form of presidential envoy Dean Acheson. UN-mediated talks – invidiously assisted by Acheson, boycotted by Makarios because he correctly apprehended that the American goal was to terminate Cyprus' independence – began in July in Geneva. Acheson dominated proceedings and, by the end of the month, the "Acheson Plan" had become the basis for all future negotiations.

The crisis resulted in the end of the Turkish Cypriot involvement in the administration and their claiming that it had lost its legitimacy. The nature of this event is still controversial: in some areas, Greek Cypriots prevented Turkish Cypriots from travelling and entering government buildings, while some Turkish Cypriots willingly refused to withdraw due to the calls of the Turkish Cypriot administration. They started living in enclaves in different areas that were blockaded by the National Guard and were directly supported by Turkey. The republic's structure was changed unilaterally by Makarios and Nicosia was divided by the Green Line, with the deployment of UNFICYP troops. In response to this, their movement and access to basic supplies became more restricted by Greek forces.

Fighting broke out again in 1967, as the Turkish Cypriots pushed for more freedom of movement. Once again, the situation was not settled until Turkey threatened to invade on the basis that it would be protecting the Turkish population from ethnic cleansing by Greek Cypriot forces. To avoid that, a compromise was reached for Greece to be forced to remove some of its troops from the island; for Georgios Grivas, EOKA leader, to be forced to leave Cyprus and for the Cypriot government to lift some restrictions of movement and access to supplies of the Turkish populations.

== Cypriot military coup of July 1974 ==
In the spring of 1974, Greek Cypriot intelligence discovered that EOKA-B was planning a coup against President Makarios which was sponsored by the military junta of Athens.

The junta had come to power in 1967, via a military coup in Athens. In the autumn of 1973, after the student uprising on 17 November, there had been another coup in Athens, in which the original Greek junta had been replaced by one still more obscurantist, headed by the chief of Military Police, Dimitrios Ioannidis; though, the actual head was General Phaedon Gizikis. Ioannides believed that Makarios was no longer a true supporter of enosis, and suspected him of being a communist sympathiser. This led Ioannides to support EOKA-B and the National Guard, as they tried to undermine Makarios.

On 2 July 1974, Makarios wrote an open letter to President Gizikis complaining bluntly that 'cadres of the Greek military regime support and direct the activities of the 'EOKA-B' terrorist organisation'. He also ordered that Greece remove some 600 Greek officers in the Cypriot National Guard from Cyprus. The Greek Government's immediate reply was to order the go-ahead of the coup. On 15 July 1974 sections of the Cypriot National Guard, led by its Greek officers, overthrew the government.

Makarios narrowly escaped death in the attack. He fled the presidential palace from its back door and went to Paphos, where the British managed to retrieve him by Westland Whirlwind helicopter in the afternoon of 16 July and flew him from Akrotiri to Malta in a Royal Air Force Armstrong Whitworth Argosy transport aircraft and from there to London by de Havilland Comet the next morning.

In the meantime, Nikos Sampson was declared provisional president of the new government. Sampson was an ultra-nationalist, pro-Enosis combatant who was known to be fanatically anti-Turkish and had taken part in violence against Turkish civilians in earlier conflicts.

The Sampson regime took over radio stations and declared that Makarios had been killed; but Makarios, safe in London, was soon able to counteract these reports. The Turkish-Cypriots were not affected by the coup against Makarios; one of the reasons was that Ioannides did not want to provoke a Turkish reaction.

In response to the coup, US Secretary of State Henry Kissinger sent Joseph Sisco to try to mediate the conflict. Turkey issued a list of demands to Greece via a US negotiator. These demands included the immediate removal of Nikos Sampson, the withdrawal of 650 Greek officers from the Cypriot National Guard, the admission of Turkish troops to protect their population, equal rights for both populations, and access to the sea from the northern coast for Turkish Cypriots. Turkey, led by Prime Minister Bülent Ecevit, then appealed to the UK as a signatory of the Treaty of Guarantee to take action to return Cyprus to its neutral status. The UK declined this offer, and refused to let Turkey use its bases on Cyprus as part of the operation.

According to American diplomat James W. Spain, on the eve of the Turkish invasion US president Richard Nixon sent a letter to Bülent Ecevit that was not just reminiscent of Lyndon B. Johnson's letter to İsmet İnönü in the Cyprus crisis of 1963–64, but even harsher. However, Nixon's letter never reached the hands of the Turkish prime minister, and no one ever heard anything about it.

Archbishop Makarios III, overthrown by the Greek junta in the 1974 coup, opposed immediate Enosis (union between Cyprus and Greece). Makarios described the coup which replaced him as "an invasion of Cyprus by Greece" in his speech to the UN Security Council and stated that there were "no prospects" of success in the talks aimed at resolving the situation between Greek and Turkish Cypriots, as long as the leaders of the coup, sponsored and supported by Greece, were in power.

== First Turkish invasion, July 1974 ==
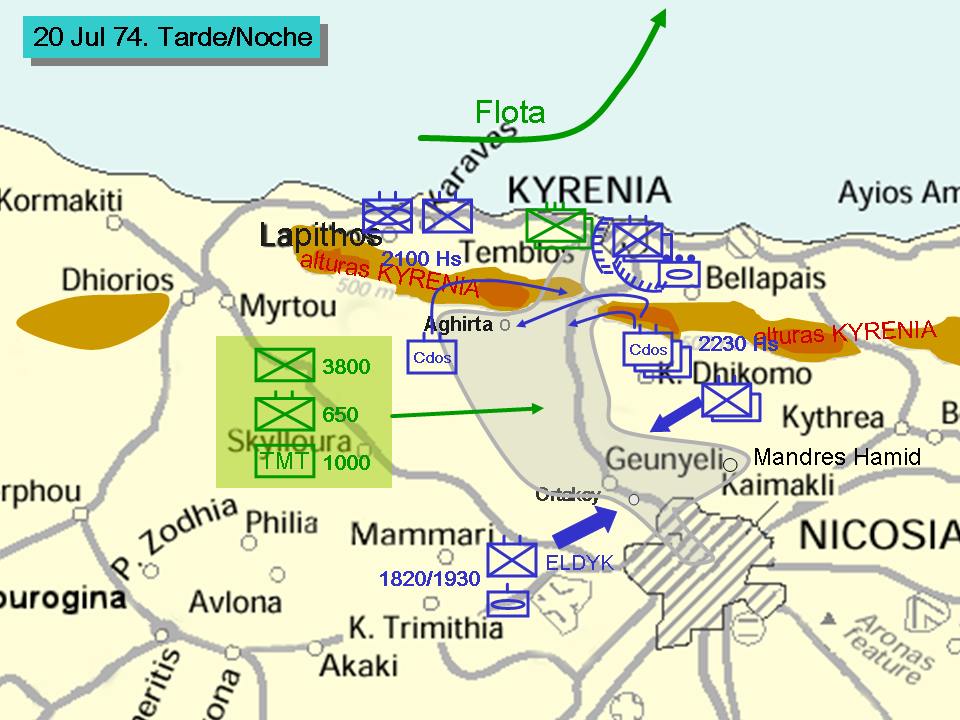
Location of Turkish forces during the late hours of 20 July 1974.

Turkey invaded Cyprus on Saturday, 20 July 1974. Heavily armed troops landed shortly before dawn at Kyrenia (Girne) on the northern coast meeting resistance from Greek and Greek Cypriot forces. Ankara said that it was invoking its right under the Treaty of Guarantee to protect the Turkish Cypriots and guarantee the independence of Cyprus. Article IV of the Treaty of Guarantee stated that, if joint action by the guarantor powers proved impossible, each retained "the right to take action with the sole aim of re-establishing the state of affairs created by the present Treaty". By the time the UN Security Council was able to obtain a ceasefire on 22 July the Turkish forces were in command of a narrow path between Kyrenia and Nicosia, 3% of the territory of Cyprus, which they succeeded in widening, violating the ceasefire demanded in Resolution 353.

On 20 July, the 10,000 inhabitants of the Turkish Cypriot enclave of Limassol surrendered to the Cypriot National Guard. Following this, according to Turkish Cypriot and Greek Cypriot eyewitness accounts, the Turkish Cypriot quarter was burned, women raped and children shot. 1,300 Turkish Cypriots were confined in a prison camp afterwards. The enclave in Famagusta was subjected to shelling and the Turkish Cypriot town of Lefka was occupied by Greek Cypriot troops. The United Kingdom maintained recognition of Makarios as the legitimate President; Makarios himself described the coup before the United Nations Security Council as "an invasion from Greece", carried out by Greek officers controlling the National Guard. The United States refused to recognize the Sampson government and voiced concerns about the coup.

According to the International Committee of the Red Cross, the prisoners of war taken at this stage and before the second invasion included 385 Greek Cypriots in Adana, 63 Greek Cypriots in the Saray Prison and 3,268 Turkish Cypriots in various camps in Cyprus.

On the night of 21 to 22 July 1974, a battalion of Greek commandos was transported to Nicosia from Crete in a clandestine airlift operation.

== Collapse of the Greek junta and peace talks ==
On 23 July 1974 the Greek military junta collapsed mainly because of the events in Cyprus. Greek political leaders in exile started returning to the country. On 24 July 1974 Constantine Karamanlis returned from Paris and was sworn in as Prime Minister. He kept Greece from entering the war, an act that was highly criticised as an act of treason. Shortly after this Nikos Sampson renounced the presidency and Glafcos Clerides temporarily took the role of president.

The first round of peace talks took place in Geneva, Switzerland between 25 and 30 July 1974, James Callaghan, the British Foreign Secretary, having summoned a conference of the three guarantor powers. There they issued a declaration that the Turkish occupation zone should not be extended, that the Turkish enclaves should immediately be evacuated by the Greeks, and that a further conference should be held at Geneva with the two Cypriot communities present to restore peace and re-establish constitutional government. In advance of this they made two observations, one upholding the 1960 constitution, the other appearing to abandon it. They called for the Turkish Vice-President to resume his functions, but they also noted 'the existence in practice of two autonomous administrations, that of the Greek Cypriot community and that of the Turkish Cypriot community'.

By the time that the second Geneva conference met on 14 August 1974, international sympathy (which had been with the Turks in their first attack) was swinging back towards Greece now that it had restored democracy. At the second round of peace talks, Turkey demanded that the Cypriot government accept its plan for a federal state, and population transfer. When the Cypriot acting president Clerides asked for 36 to 48 hours in order to consult with Athens and with Greek Cypriot leaders, the Turkish Foreign Minister denied Clerides that opportunity on the grounds that Makarios and others would use it to play for more time.

== Second Turkish invasion, 14–16 August 1974 ==
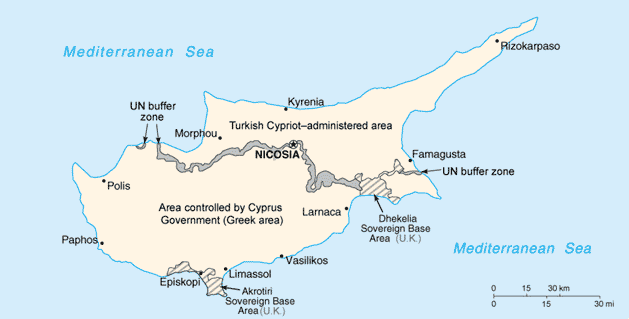
Map showing the division of Cyprus

The Turkish Foreign Minister Turan Güneş had said to the Prime Minister Bülent Ecevit, "When I say 'Ayşe (Note: Ayşe is a daughter of Turan Güneş, today Ayşe Güneş Ayata) should go on vacation' (Turkish: "Ayşe Tatile Çıksın"), it will mean that our armed forces are ready to go into action. Even if the telephone line is tapped, that would rouse no suspicion." An hour and a half after the conference broke up, Güneş called Ecevit and said the code phrase. On 14 August Turkey launched its "Second Peace Operation", which eventually resulted in the Turkish occupation of 37% of Cyprus. Turkish occupation reached as far south as the Louroujina Salient.

In the process, many Greek Cypriots became refugees. The number of refugees is estimated to be between 140,000 and 160,000. The ceasefire line from 1974 separates the two communities on the island, and is commonly referred to as the Green Line.

After the conflict, Cypriot representatives and the United Nations consented to the transfer of the remainder of the 51,000 Turkish Cypriots that had not left their homes in the south to settle in the north, if they wished to do so.

The United Nations Security Council has challenged the legality of Turkey's action, because Article Four of the Treaty of Guarantee gives the right to guarantors to take action with the sole aim of re-establishing the state of affairs. The aftermath of Turkey's invasion, however, did not safeguard the Republic's sovereignty and territorial integrity, but had the opposite effect: the de facto partition of the Republic and the creation of a separate political entity in the north. On 13 February 1975, Turkey declared the occupied areas of the Republic of Cyprus to be a "Federated Turkish State", to the universal condemnation of the international community (see United Nations Security Council Resolution 367). The United Nations recognises the sovereignty of the Republic of Cyprus according to the terms of its independence in 1960. The conflict continues to affect Turkey's relations with Cyprus, Greece, and the European Union.

== Human rights violations ==
=== Against Greek Cypriots ===
Most losses and disappearances during the invasion affected Greek Cypriots, with few exceptions. Turkish troops launched a "brutal campaign" on the island involving mass murders, mass rapes, mass expulsions and looting.

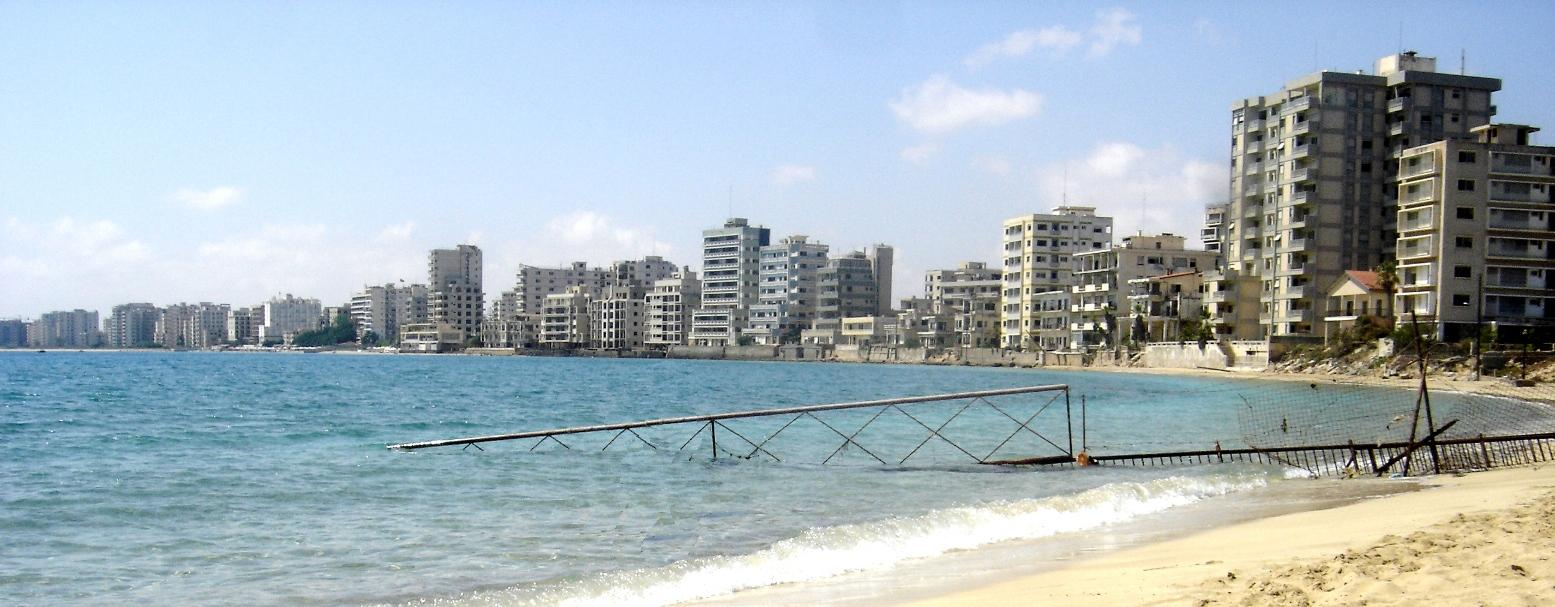
Varosha, a suburb of Famagusta, was abandoned when its inhabitants fled in 1974 and remains under military control.

Turkey was found guilty by the European Commission of Human Rights for displacement of persons, deprivation of liberty, ill treatment, deprivation of life and deprivation of possessions. The Turkish policy of violently forcing a third of the island's Greek population from their homes in the occupied North, preventing their return and settling Turks from mainland Turkey is considered an example of ethnic cleansing, described by some sources as "matched by that of Palestine in 1948 and since".

In 1976 and again in 1983, the European Commission of Human Rights found Turkey guilty of repeated violations of the European Convention of Human Rights. Turkey has been condemned for preventing the return of Greek Cypriot refugees to their properties. The European Commission of Human Rights reports of 1976 and 1983 state the following:

Having found violations of a number of Articles of the Convention, the Commission notes that the acts violating the Convention were exclusively directed against members of one of two communities in Cyprus, namely the Greek Cypriot community. It concludes by eleven votes to three that Turkey has thus failed to secure the rights and freedoms set forth in these Articles without discrimination on the grounds of ethnic origin, race, religion as required by Article 14 of the Convention.

Enclaved Greek Cypriots in the Karpass Peninsula in 1975 were subjected by the Turks to violations of their human rights so that by 2001 when the European Court of Human Rights found Turkey guilty of the violation of 14 articles of the European Convention of Human Rights in its judgement of Cyprus v Turkey (application no. 25781/94), less than 600 still remained. In the same judgement, Turkey was found guilty of violating the rights of the Turkish Cypriots by authorising the trial of civilians by a military court.

The European Commission of Human Rights, with 12 votes against 1, accepted evidence from the Republic of Cyprus, concerning the rapes of various Greek-Cypriot women by Turkish soldiers and the torture of many Greek-Cypriot prisoners during the invasion of the island. The high rate of rape reportedly resulted in the temporary permission of abortion in Cyprus by the conservative Cypriot Orthodox Church. According to Paul Sant Cassia, rape was used systematically to "soften" resistance and clear civilian areas through fear. Many of the atrocities were seen as revenge for the atrocities against Turkish Cypriots in 1963–64 and the massacres during the first invasion. It has been suggested that many of the atrocities were revenge killings, committed by Turkish Cypriot fighters in military uniform who might have been mistaken for Turkish soldiers. In the Karpass Peninsula, a group of Turkish Cypriots reportedly chose young girls to rape and impregnated teenage girls. There were cases of rapes, which included gang rapes, of teenage girls by Turkish soldiers and Turkish Cypriot men in the peninsula, and one case involved the rape of an old Greek Cypriot man by a Turkish Cypriot. The man was reportedly identified by the victim and two other rapists were also arrested. Raped women were sometimes outcast from society.

In the years after the invasion, Turkey also supplemented the Turkish Cypriot population through the resettlement of settlers from Turkey, a policy that some scholars characterize as a form of settler colonialism in a hybrid and non-classical form. American-born journalist, author, and Middle East correspondent Michael Jansen also wrote: "The process of denuding the north of its heritage can be classified as 'cultural genocide' affecting all Cypriots – Greek, Turkish, Armenian, and Maronite – forever".

=== Against Turkish Cypriots ===
The Cypriot National Guard and EOKA B had strict orders, apparently from the Greek junta, to not harm Turkish Cypriots. During the period between the coup and the Turkish invasion, there were no attacks against them. Violence ensued only after the invasion's launch.

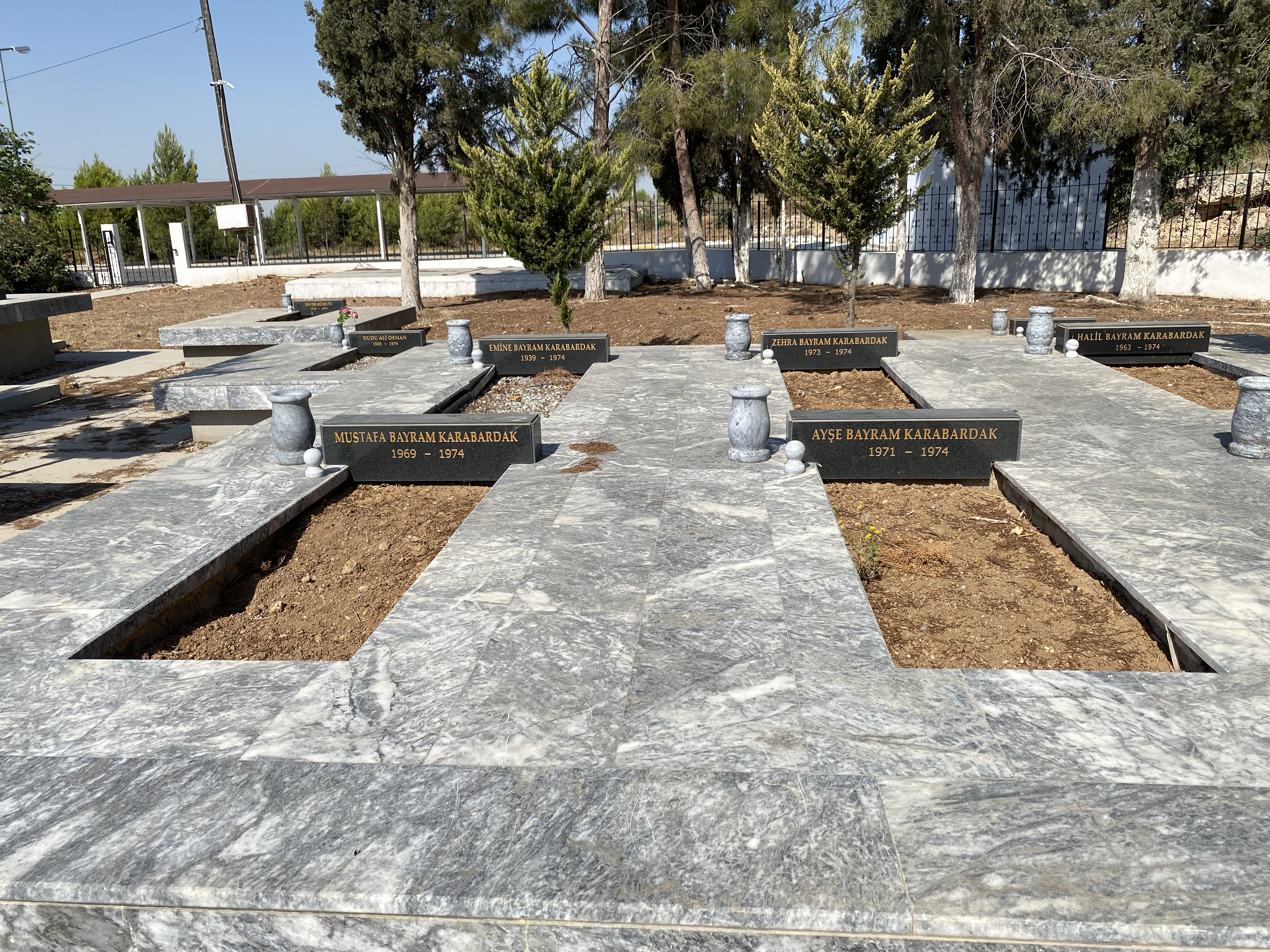
A view from the cemetery in the village of Maratha, where the victims of the massacre are buried individually. This is the photograph of a family grave, showing the four children killed in a single family.

After the first invasion, on 20 July, in the Alaminos massacre, 14 Turks were massacred and buried by a bulldozer. After the second invasion on 14 August, the Maratha, Santalaris and Aloda massacre was committed by EOKA B, in which 126 people were killed. In the Tochni massacre, which happened on the same day, 85 Turkish Cypriot inhabitants were massacred.

The Washington Post covered another news of atrocity in which it is written that: "In a Greek raid on a small Turkish village near Limassol, 36 people out of a population of 200 were killed. The Greeks said that they had been given orders to kill the inhabitants of the Turkish villages before the Turkish forces arrived." In Limassol, upon the fall of the Turkish Cypriot enclave to the Cypriot National Guard, the Turkish Cypriot quarter was burned, women raped and children shot, according to Turkish Cypriot and Greek Cypriot eyewitness accounts.

Turkish authorities and Turkish Cypriot publications alleged that Greek Cypriots were committing or planning a "genocide" against Turkish Cypriots. However, these claims are regarded by historians and scholars to have been false and propagandistic in nature. A 1975 British military assessment confirmed Stephen Olver's telegram that Turkish Cypriots had not been in any danger before the invasion and that Turkey had no genuine protective pretext for the invasion.

=== Missing people ===
Greek Cypriot prisoners taken to Adana camps in Turkey

The missing persons list of the Republic of Cyprus confirms that 83 Turkish Cypriots disappeared in Tochni on 14 August 1974. Also, as a result of the invasion, over 2000 Greek-Cypriot prisoners of war were taken to Turkey and detained in Turkish prisons. Some of them were not released and are still missing. In particular, the Committee on Missing Persons (CMP) in Cyprus, which operates under the auspices of the United Nations, is mandated to investigate approximately 1600 cases of Greek Cypriot and Greek missing persons.

The issue of missing persons in Cyprus took a new turn in the summer of 2004 when the UN-sponsored Committee on Missing Persons (CMP) began returning remains of identified missing individuals to their families. CMP designed and started to implement (from August 2006) its project on the Exhumation, Identification and Return of Remains of Missing Persons. The whole project is being implemented by bi-communal teams of Greek Cypriots and Turkish Cypriot scientists (archaeologists, anthropologists and geneticists) under the overall responsibility of the CMP. By the end of 2007, 57 individuals had been identified and their remains returned to their families.

=== Destruction of cultural heritage ===
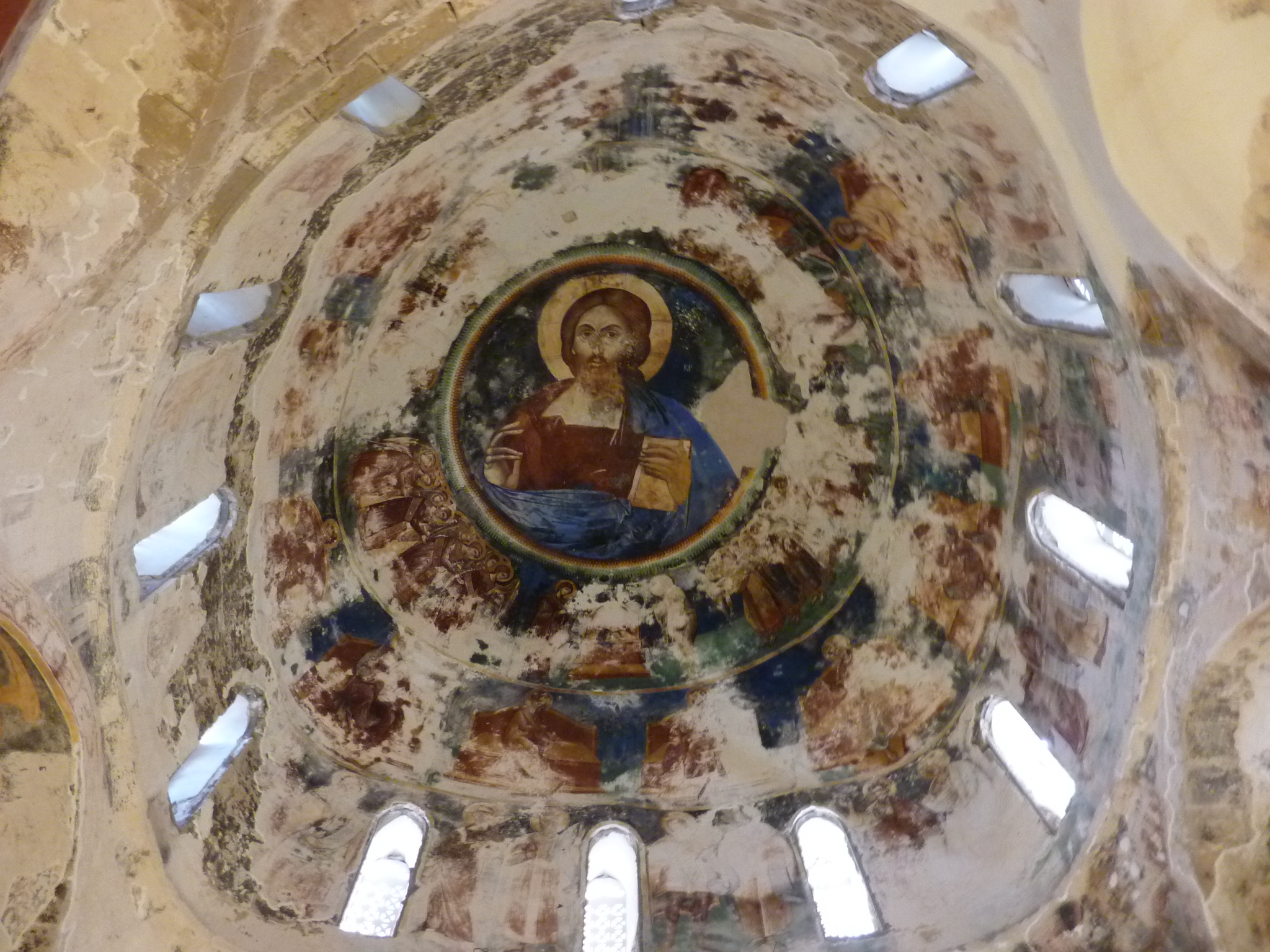
A view from the interior of Antiphonitis, where frescoes have been looted

In 1989, the government of Cyprus took an American art dealer to court for the return of four rare 6th-century Byzantine mosaics that survived an edict by the Byzantine emperor, imposing the destruction of all images of sacred figures. Cyprus won the case, and the mosaics were eventually returned. In October 1997, Aydın Dikmen, who had sold the mosaics, was arrested in Germany in a police raid and found to be in possession of a stash consisting of mosaics, frescoes and icons dating back to the 6th, 12th and 15th centuries, worth over $50 million. The mosaics, depicting Saints Thaddeus and Thomas, are two more sections from the apse of the Kanakaria Church, while the frescoes, including the Last Judgement and the Tree of Jesse, were taken off the north and south walls of the Monastery of Antiphonitis, built between the 12th and 15th centuries. Frescoes found in possession of Dikmen included those from the 11th–12th century Church of Panagia Pergaminiotisa in Akanthou, which had been completely stripped of its ornate frescoes.

According to a Greek Cypriot claim, since 1974, at least 55 churches have been converted into mosques and another 50 churches and monasteries have been converted into stables, stores, hostels, or museums, or have been demolished. According to the government spokesman of the de facto Turkish Republic of Northern Cyprus, this has been done to keep the buildings from falling into ruin.

In January 2011, the British singer Boy George returned an 18th-century icon of Christ to the Church of Cyprus that he had bought without knowing the origin. The icon, which had adorned his home for 26 years, had been looted from the church of St Charalampus from the village of New Chorio, near Kythrea, in 1974. The icon was noticed by church officials during a television interview of Boy George at his home. The church contacted the singer who agreed to return the icon at Saints Anargyroi Church, Highgate, north London.

== Opinions ==
=== Greek Cypriot ===
Greek Cypriots have claimed that the invasion and subsequent actions by Turkey have been diplomatic ploys, furthered by ultranationalist Turkish militants to justify expansionist Pan-Turkism. They have also criticised the perceived failure of Turkish intervention to achieve or justify its stated goals (protecting the sovereignty, integrity, and independence of the Republic of Cyprus), claiming that Turkey's intentions from the beginning were to create the state of Northern Cyprus.

Greek Cypriots condemn the brutality of the Turkish invasion, including but not limited to the high levels of rape, child rape and torture. Greek Cypriots emphasise that in 1976 and 1983 Turkey was found guilty by the European Commission of Human Rights of repeated violations of the European Convention of Human Rights.

Greek Cypriots have also claimed that the second wave of the Turkish invasion that occurred in August 1974, even after the Greek Junta had collapsed on 24 July 1974 and the democratic government of the Republic of Cyprus had been restored under Glafkos Clerides, did not constitute a justified intervention as had been the case with the first wave of the Turkish invasion that led to the Junta's collapse.

The stationing of 40,000 Turkish troops on Northern Cyprus after the invasion in violation of resolutions by the United Nations has also been criticised.

In United Nations Security Council Resolution 353, adopted unanimously on 20 July 1974, in response to the Turkish invasion of Cyprus, the Council demanded the immediate withdrawal of all foreign military personnel present in the Republic of Cyprus in contravention of paragraph 1 of the United Nations Charter.

The United Nations Security Council Resolution 360 adopted on 16 August 1974 declared their respect for the sovereignty, independence and territorial integrity of the Republic of Cyprus, and formally recorded its disapproval of the unilateral military actions taken against it by Turkey.

=== Turkish Cypriot ===
In Resolution 573, the Council of Europe supported the legality of the first wave of the Turkish invasion that occurred in July 1974, as per Article 4 of the Guarantee Treaty of 1960, which allows Turkey, Greece, and the United Kingdom to unilaterally intervene militarily in failure of a multilateral response to crisis in Cyprus.

== Declaration of the Turkish Republic of Northern Cyprus ==
Flag of the Turkish Republic of Northern Cyprus, an entity recognised only by Turkey

Greek Cypriots who were unhappy with the United States not stopping the Turkish invasion took part in protests and riots in front of the American embassy. Ambassador Rodger Davies was assassinated during the protests by a sniper from the extremist EOKA-B group.

In 1983, the Turkish Cypriot assembly declared the independence of the Turkish Republic of Northern Cyprus. Immediately upon this declaration, Britain convened a meeting of the United Nations Security Council to condemn the declaration as "legally invalid". United Nations Security Council Resolution 541 (1983) considered the "attempt to create the Turkish Republic of Northern Cyprus is invalid, and will contribute to a worsening of the situation in Cyprus". The non-binding Resolution 1983/541 went on to state that it "considers the declaration referred to above as legally invalid and calls for its withdrawal".

In the following year UN resolution 550 (1984) condemned the "exchange of Ambassadors" between Turkey and the TRNC and went on to add that the Security Council "considers attempts to settle any part of Varosha by people other than its inhabitants as inadmissible and calls for the transfer of this area to the administration of the United Nations".

Neither Turkey nor the TRNC have complied with the above resolutions and Varosha remains uninhabited. In 2017, Varosha's beach was opened for exclusive use by Turks (Turkish-Cypriots and Turkish nationals).

On 22 July 2010, United Nations' International Court of Justice decided that "International law contains no prohibition on declarations of independence". In response to this non-legally-binding direction, German Foreign Minister Guido Westerwelle said it "has nothing to do with any other cases in the world" including Cyprus, whereas some researchers stated the decision of ICJ provided the Turkish Cypriots an option to be used.

== Ongoing negotiations ==
Proposed flag of the United Republic of Cyprus under the Annan Plan

The United Nations Security Council decisions for the immediate unconditional withdrawal of all foreign troops from Cyprus soil and the safe return of the refugees to their homes have not been implemented by Turkey and the TRNC. Turkey and TRNC defend their position, stating that any such withdrawal would have led to a resumption of intercommunal fighting and killing.

In 1999, UNHCR halted its assistance activities for internally displaced persons in Cyprus.

Negotiations to find a solution to the Cyprus problem have been taking place on and off since 1964. Between 1974 and 2002, the Turkish Cypriot side was seen by the international community as the side refusing a balanced solution. Since 2002, the situation has been reversed according to US and UK officials, and the Greek Cypriot side rejected a plan which would have called for the dissolution of the Republic of Cyprus without guarantees that the Turkish occupation forces would be removed. The latest Annan Plan to reunify the island which was endorsed by the United States, United Kingdom, and Turkey was accepted by a referendum by Turkish Cypriots but overwhelmingly rejected in parallel referendum by Greek Cypriots, after the Greek Cypriot Leadership and Greek Orthodox Church urged the Greek population to vote "no".

Greek Cypriots rejected the UN settlement plan in an April 2004 referendum. On 24 April 2004, the Greek Cypriots rejected by a three-to-one margin the plan proposed by UN Secretary-General Kofi Annan for the settlement of the Cyprus dispute. The plan, which was approved by a two-to-one margin by the Turkish Cypriots in a separate but simultaneous referendum, would have created a United Cyprus Republic and ensured that the entire island would reap the benefits of Cyprus's entry into the European Union on 1 May. The plan would have created a United Cyprus Republic consisting of a Greek Cypriot constituent state and a Turkish Cypriot constituent state linked by a federal government. More than half of the Greek Cypriots who were displaced in 1974 and their descendants would have had their properties returned to them and would have lived in them under Greek Cypriot administration within a period of 3.5 to 42 months after the entry into force of the settlement. For those whose property could not be returned, they would have received monetary compensation.

Cyprus joined the EU on 1 May 2004

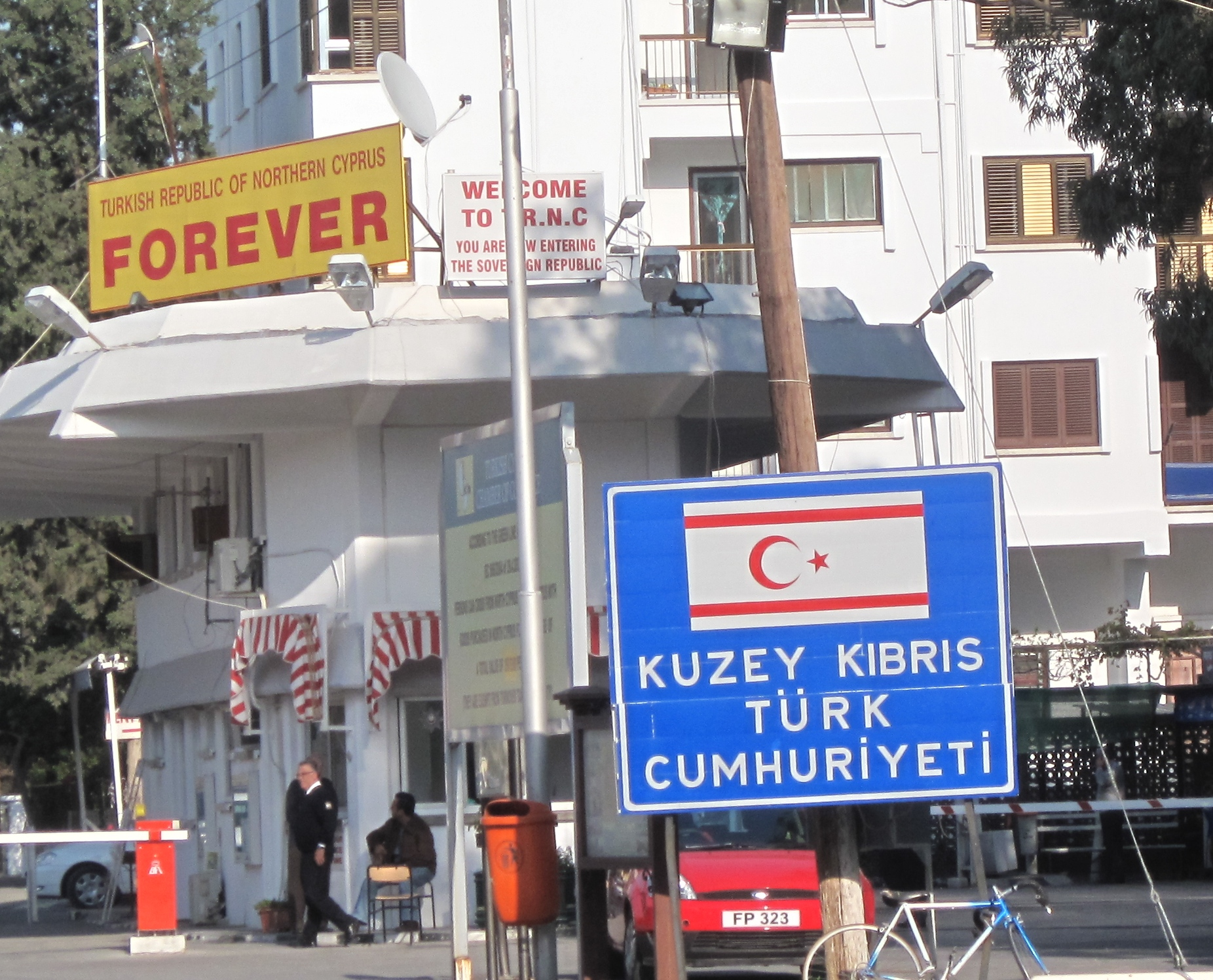
Turkish Republic of Northern Cyprus

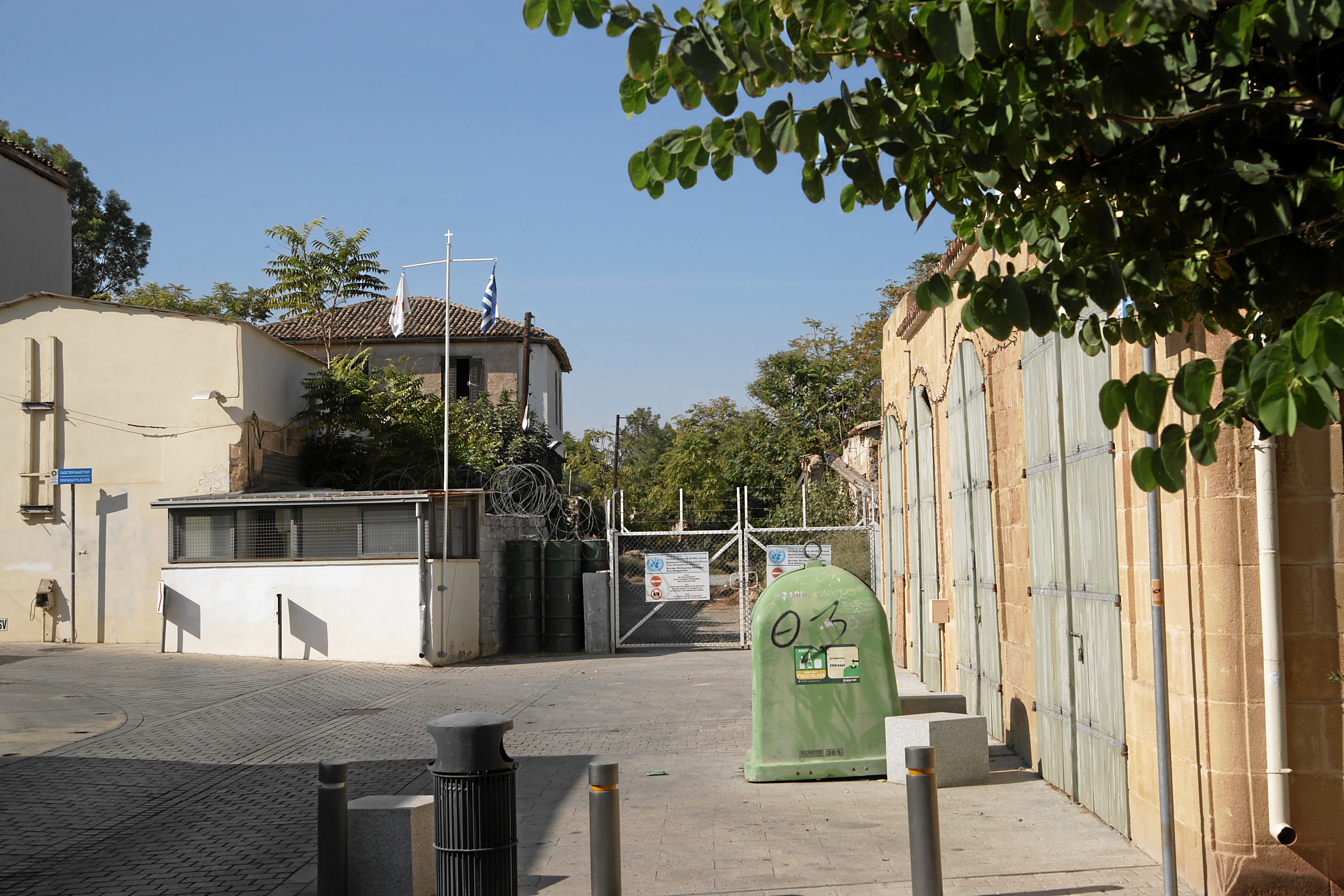
Border gate in the buffer zone

The entire island entered the EU on 1 May 2004 still divided, although the EU acquis communautaire – the body of common rights and obligations – applies only to the areas under direct government control, and is suspended in the areas occupied by the Turkish military and administered by Turkish Cypriots. However, individual Turkish Cypriots able to document their eligibility for Republic of Cyprus citizenship legally enjoy the same rights accorded to other citizens of European Union states. The Greek Cypriot government in Nicosia continues to oppose EU efforts to establish direct trade and economic links to TRNC as a way of encouraging the Turkish Cypriot community to continue to support the resolution of the Cyprus dispute.

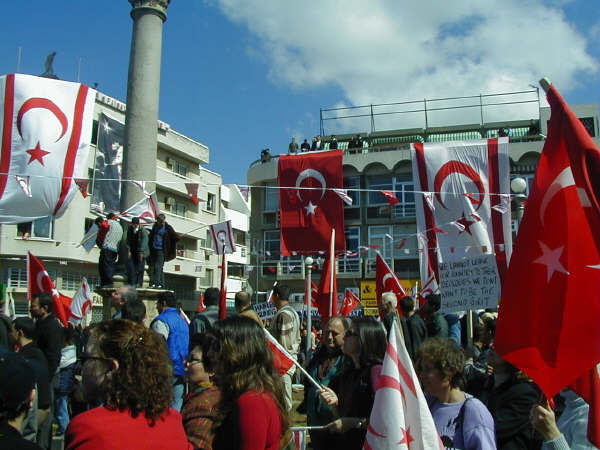
Atatürk Square, North Nicosia

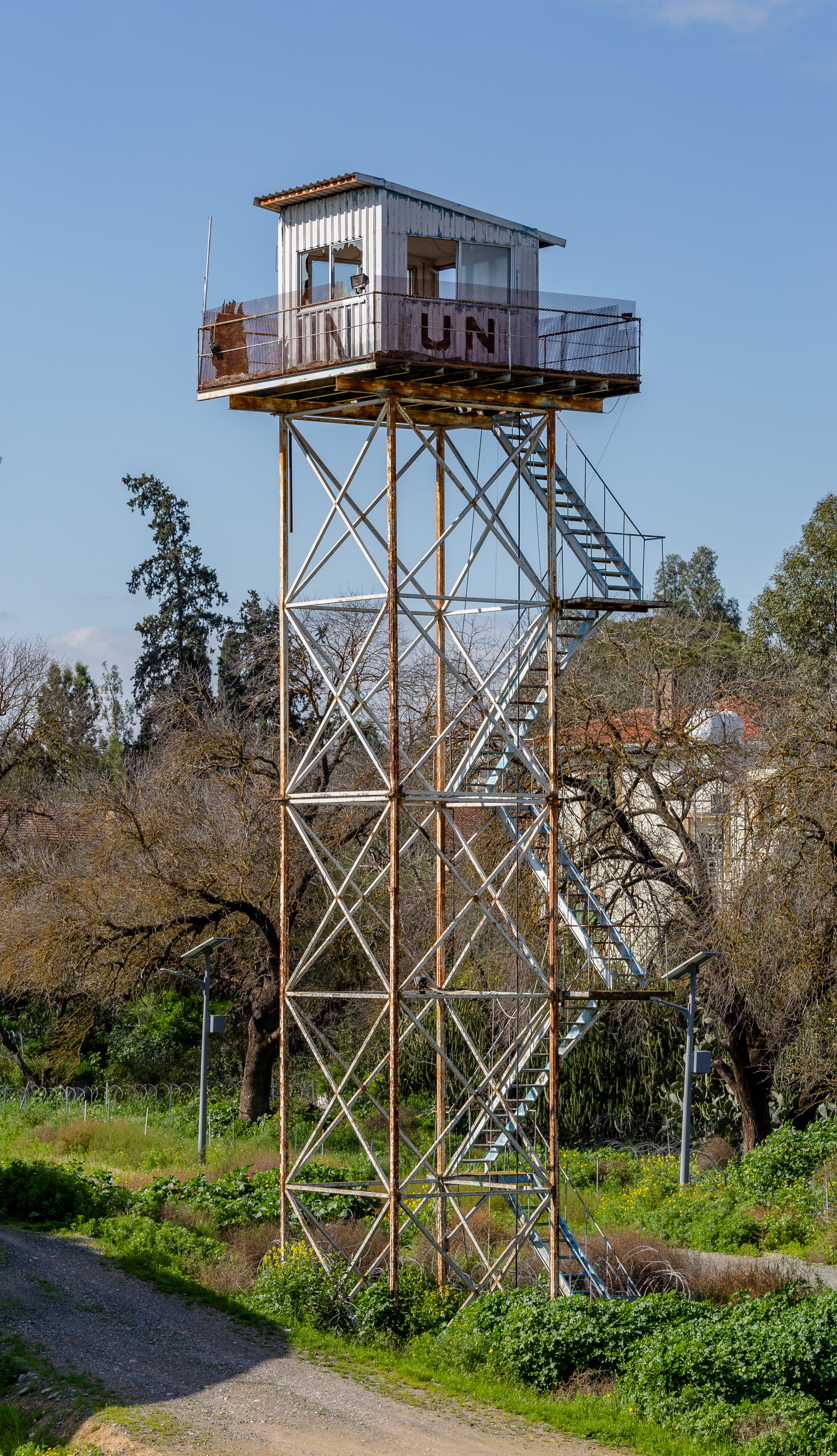
UN tower in the Nicosia border

=== Turkish settlers ===
As a result of the Turkish invasion, the Parliamentary Assembly of the Council of Europe stated that the demographic structure of the island has been continuously modified as a result of the deliberate policies of the Turks. Following the occupation of Northern Cyprus, civilian settlers from Turkey began arriving on the island. Despite the lack of consensus on the exact figures, all parties concerned admitted that Turkish nationals began arriving in the northern part of the island in 1975. It was suggested that over 120,000 settlers came to Cyprus from mainland Turkey. This was a violation of the Article 49 of the Fourth Geneva Convention, which prohibits an occupier from transferring or deporting parts of its own civilian population into an occupied territory.

UN Resolution 1987/19 (1987) of the "Sub-Commission On Prevention Of Discrimination And Protection Of Minorities", which was adopted on 2 September 1987, demanded "the full restoration of all human rights to the whole population of Cyprus, including the freedom of movement, the freedom of settlement and the right to property" and also expressed "its concern also at the policy and practice of the implantation of settlers in the occupied territories of Cyprus which constitute a form of colonialism and attempt to change illegally the demographic structure of Cyprus."

In a report prepared by Mete Hatay on behalf of PRIO (Peace Research Institute Oslo), it was estimated that the number of Turkish mainlanders in the north who have been granted the right to vote is 37,000. This figure however excludes mainlanders who are married to Turkish Cypriots or adult children of mainland settlers as well as all minors. The report also estimates the number of Turkish mainlanders who have not been granted the right to vote, whom it labels as "transients", at a further 105,000.

=== United States arms embargo on Turkey and Republic of Cyprus ===
After the hostilities of 1974, the United States applied an arms embargo on both Turkey and Cyprus. The embargo on Turkey was lifted after three years by President Jimmy Carter, whereas the embargo on Cyprus remained in place for longer, having most recently been enforced on 18 November 1992. In December 2019, the US Congress lifted the decades-old arms embargo on Cyprus. On 2 September 2020, United States decided to lift the embargo on selling "non-lethal" military goods to Cyprus for one year starting from 1 October. Each year the US decided to renew its decision (the latest being September 2024), a move which was heavily criticised by Turkey. In August 2024, Cyprus and the US signed a defense cooperation agreement valid for the next five years; Turkey also condemned this agreement.

== See also ==
- 39th Infantry Division – the major Turkish unit in the invasion
- 1964 Battle of Tylliria
- Cyprus Air Forces
- Cyprus Navy and Marine Police
- Greece–Turkey relations
- History of Cyprus (1878–present)
- List of massacres in Cyprus
- List of modern conflicts in the Middle East
- Reported military losses during the Turkish invasion of Cyprus

== General references ==
- Bolukbasi, Suha (1993). "The Johnson letter revisited". Middle Eastern Studies. 29 (3): 505–525. doi:10.1080/00263209308700963.
- Brinkley, Douglas (1992). Dean Acheson: The Cold War Years, 1953–71. New Haven, CT: Yale University Press.
- Erickson, Edward J.; Uyar, Mesut (2020). Phase Line Attila: The Amphibious Campaign for Cyprus, 1974. Marine Corps University Press. doi:10.56686/9781732003088. ISBN 978-1-7320030-8-8.
- Hatziantoniou, Kostas (2007). Κύπρος 1954–1974: Από το Έπος στην Τραγωδία (in Greek). IANOS. ISBN 978-960-426-451-3.
- Mallinson, William (2016). Kissinger and the Invasion of Cyprus: Diplomacy in the Eastern Mediterranean. Newcastle upon Tyne: Cambridge Scholars Publishing. ISBN 978-1-4438-9737-2.
- Moudouros, Nikos (2025). "Settler colonialism or a hybrid case? Dimensions of colonization in Cyprus and Turkish Cypriot–settler antagonism" (PDF). International Journal of Anthropology and Ethnology. 9 (14) 14. doi:10.1186/s41257-025-00137-7.
- O'Malley, Brendan; Craig, Ian (1999). The Cyprus Conspiracy. London: IB Tauris. ISBN 978-1-860-64439-9.
- Varnava, Marilena (2020). Cyprus Before 1974: The Prelude to Crisis. London: I.B. Tauris. ISBN 978-1-784-53997-9.
