= List of massacres in Cyprus =

The following is a list of massacres that have occurred in Cyprus

| Name | Date | Location | Deaths | Perpetrators | Notes |
|---|---|---|---|---|---|
| Jewish massacre of Greeks | 117 CE | mainly Salamis | 240,000 (Note: This estimate comes from the Roman historian Cassius Dio.) | Jewish rebels | After the revolt had been fully defeated, laws were created forbidding any Jews to live on the island. |
| Massacre in Lefkara | 1570 | Lefkara | 400 | Venetian army | against Cypriots of village |
| Massacre in Nicosia | September 9, 1570 | Nicosia | 20,000 | Ottoman army | The city was looted following its fall to Ottomans, the figure is an estimation of deaths. |
| 9 July Massacre of Greek-Cypriots | July 9, 1821 | Nicosia | 486 | Ottoman army | Hundreds of prominent Greek-Cypriots including Archbishop Kyprianos were executed by the Ottoman Turks during the Massacres of the Greek War of Independence. |
| Massacre of Greek-Cypriot unarmed civilians [tr] | June 12, 1958 | Kioneli | 8 | Turkish Cypriot Civilians | On June 12, 1958, eight Greek-Cypriots out of an armed group of thirty five were killed by Turkish Cypriot locals, near the village of Geunyeli, after having been ordered to walk back to their village of Kondemenos in suspicion of preparing an attack on the Turkish quarter of Skylloura. Part of Cypriot intercommunal violence |
| Bloody Christmas | 21–31 December 1963 | Nicosia | 364 Turkish Cypriots and 174 Greek Cypriots | Greek Cypriots and Turkish Cypriots | Greek Cypriot irregulars committed a massacre in Omorphita, killing Turkish Cypriot women and children indiscriminately. 25,000 Turkish Cypriots fled and were displaced into enclaves. Thousands of Turkish Cypriot homes were ransacked or destroyed 364 Turkish and 174 Greek Cypriots were killed in total, Around 1,200 Armenian and 500 Greek Cypriots were also displaced as a result. |
| Monasteri massacre | 1 January 1964 | Mosfiloti | 3 | Turks of Cyprus | Turks attacked a monastery massacring three unarmed Greek monks with shotguns and injuring additional four. |
| Limassol massacre | 13 February 1964 | Limassol | 16 | Greek Cypriots | The Greeks and Greek Cypriots used tanks to attack and massacre the Turkish Cypriot quarter of Limassol, killing 16 people while injuring 35. |
| Massacre in Famagusta | May 12, 1964 | Famagusta | 17 | Greek Cypriot militia | The event happened as an act of revenge for the killing of 2 Cypriot soldiers and 1 police in city at 11 May. |
| Massacre in Akrotiri and Dhekelia | May 13, 1964 | Akrotiri and Dhekelia | 11 | Greek Cypriot police forces and civilians | The massacre was committed as an act of revenge for the killing of 2 Cypriot soldiers and 1 police officer in Famagusta on 11 May. |
| Alaminos massacre | July 20, 1974 | Alaminos | 13 or 14 | Greek Cypriot militia | 183 Turkish Cypriots and 350 Greek Cypriots used to live in town before massacre. Part of Turkish invasion of Cyprus |
| Massacre in Sysklipos | August 3, 1974 | Sysklipos | 14 | Turkish Cypriot militia and Turkish army | 14 Greek Cypriots were killed in a house and their bodies were buried in a mass grave on August 3, and those who remained at the village disappeared on August 26, they are still missing. Part of Turkish invasion of Cyprus |
| Maratha, Santalaris and Aloda massacre | August 14, 1974 | Maratha, Santalaris and Aloda | 126 | EOKA B | Almost all of the Turkish Cypriot inhabitants of the villages were killed and their bodies were battered. Part of Turkish invasion of Cyprus |
| Tochni massacre | August 14, 1974 | Tochni | 84 | EOKA B | EOKA B took 85 hostages from the village of Tochni and the nearby village of Zygi, mainly men and minor boys who were 13 years old, to the village of Palodia for execution with automatic guns. One of them managed to escape. Part of Turkish invasion of Cyprus |
| Massacre in Prastio | August 16, 1974 | Prastio, Famagusta | 8 | Turkish army | Execution of eight civilians who were taken prisoner by Turkish soldiers. Part of Turkish invasion of Cyprus |
| Massacres of the people of Asha | August, 1974 | Asha and Sinta | 97 | Turkish army | 17-18 men were taken to Sinta as prisoners of war and they were shot there. Other villagers were deported in two buses and they were shot on the way back from the police headquarters in Nicosia. Total number of missing from the village is given as 97. Part of Turkish invasion of Cyprus. |
| Massacre in Eptakomi | August, 1974 | Eptakomi | 12 | Turkish army and militias | 12 Greek Cypriots were executed while their hands were tied and their bodies were found in a mass grave. Part of Turkish invasion of Cyprus. |
| Massacre in Angolemi | August, 1974 | Angolemi | 5 | Greek Cypriot militia | A family of three (father, mother and teenage daughter) and two men killed. Part of Turkish invasion of Cyprus |

== See also ==
- List of massacres in Turkey
