= Turkish massacre =

Turkish massacre can refer to any of multiple events listed at

- List of massacres in Turkey
- List of massacres of Turkish people

== See also ==
- Armenian genocide
- Turkish war crimes
