= Police Reserve Corps =

Police Reserve Corps (Efedriko)
- Εφεδρικό Σώμα της Αστυνομίας Κύπρου
- Leader: Pantelis Pantatzis
- Dates active: 1973 - 1974
- Headquarters: Nicosia, Cyprus
- Ideology: Pro Makarios
- Size: 330
- Part of: Cyprus Police

The Reserve Corps of the Cyprus Police (Or Efedhrikón), was a military force created by the detachment of Cypriot police officers, as the rival organization of the paramilitary organization, EOKA B, to fight and if possible, destroy it and to protect the then President of the Republic of Cyprus, Archbishop Makarios.

it had an active role in dealing with the Coup d'état of 1974, alongside the Cyprus Police and the Presidential Guard. The Reserve Corps was one of the strongest forms of resistance together with the other resistance police officers and in some cases, ordinary citizens of the Republic of Cyprus.

== Controversy ==
The Efedrikos existence and certain actions to tackle EOKA B has been criticised due to some tactics used (Such as torture, beatings and warrantless arrests) in its campaign.
