= Third Vienna Agreement =

August 1975 agreement

The Third Vienna Agreement, also known as the Voluntary Exchange of Populations or Population Exchange Agreement, was a bilateral agreement reached between the Turkish Cypriot leadership (Rauf Denktaş) and the president of Cyprus (Glafcos Clerides) in August 1975. It mainly allowed Turkish Cypriots in the south to move north voluntarily.

It also provided for the safekeeping of the enclaved Greek Cypriots in the north, but this was never fully implemented because the Turkish Army overruled it, through discrimination, harassment, and intimidation, causing the number of Greek Cypriots to decline from 13,000 in 1975 to solely 500 in 2010.

The following issues were agreed upon:

1. The Turkish Cypriots in the south of the island would be allowed, if they wanted to do so, to proceed north with their belongings under an organised programme and with the assistance of the United Nations Peace Keeping Force in Cyprus (UNFICYP).
2. Mr. Denktaş reaffirmed, and it was agreed, that the Greek Cypriots in the north of the island would be free to stay and that they would be given every help to lead a normal life, including facilities for education and for the practice of their religion, as well as medical care by their own doctors and freedom of movement in the north.
3. The Greek Cypriots in the north who, at their own request and without having been subjected to any kind of pressure, wished to move to the south, would be permitted to do so.
4. The United Nations would have free and normal access to Greek Cypriot villages and habitations in the north.
5. In connection with the implementation of the above agreement, priority would be given to the reunification of families, which may also involve the transfer of a number of Greek Cypriots in the south, to the north.

== Background ==
=== Political situation ===
From 1975 the Greek Cypriot administration closely coordinated its foreign policies with those of Greece, in the hope of regaining control of the north. The Turkish Cypriots meanwhile decided to form their own separate, federated state in the north of the island, with the wish to one day be accepted into a federal Cyprus and be treated as equals.

A new Constitution was drafted, and the Temporary Turkish Cypriot Administration (Turkish: Geçici Kıbrıs Türk Yönetimi), also known as the Autonomous Turkish Cypriot Administration of the Republic of Cyprus (Turkish: Otonom Kıbrıs Türk Yönetimi), officially became the Turkish Federated State of Cyprus (Turkish: Kıbrıs Türk Federe Devleti), with Rauf Denktaş as acting president. Turkey supported this decision and endorsed federalism as the answer to the Cyprus Problem.

According to its Constitution, executive power was vested in a President, to be elected by universal suffrage for a period of five years, and a Prime Minister, to be appointed by the President from among the deputies. Legislative power was vested in an Assemble composed of 40 deputies elected for a period of five years.

Following criticism Denktaş clarified that it was by no means a unilateral declaration of independence, and that it was only to last until a suitable arrangement could be worked out with the Greek Cypriot administration which would satisfy the minimum requirements of the Turkish Cypriot community.

Greek Cypriot leader Makarios III and Greek Prime Minister Konstantinos Karamanlis bitterly denounced the act and blamed the United States for not preventing it.

There were large demonstrations in south Lefkoşa, as well as ominous talk of plans for a new armed guerrilla campaign against the Turkish Cypriots and their federated state.

=== Intercommunal talks in Vienna ===
The UN Secretary-General Kurt Waldheim established a good offices mission for Cyprus and the first round of inter-communal talks took place in Vienna, between 28 April and 3 May 1975.

Clerides wished to first establish the powers and functions of the central government to be. Denktaş felt it more urgent to clarify the territorial aspects of a future settlement so that they could know for certain where Turkish Cypriot refugees from the south could be resettled, over concerns they could become dispossessed once more as a result of future negotiations.

The second round of talks took place between 5 and 7 June. Meanwhile concerns for the safety of Turkish Cypriot refugees still trapped in the south increased sharply.

A group of Turkish Cypriot refugees consisting of 48 men, women, elderly and children, while crossing the Trodos mountains on their way to reach the north, was intercepted by Greek Cypriot police. They were brutally assaulted and forced to mop up their own blood, before being left in a Baf street and left to fend for themselves. Denktaş, upon learning of this incident, promptly expelled some 800 Greek Cypriots from the north, including the entire population of the village of Davlos, on the Karpas peninsula, and warned against any further ill-treatment or restrictions on Turkish Cypriots still living in the south. Makarios suspended the 13 policemen involved and allowed the 48 refugees to leave the south.

The Turkish Cypriots proposed the establishment of a "transitional joint government" with the aim of "preventing any further alienation and separation of the two communities" on 18 July 1975, and on 25 July 1975, James Callaghan, the British Foreign Secretary, summoned a conference of the three guarantor powers.

Peace talks began in Geneva, Switzerland, where Britain issued a declaration that the areas under the control of Turkish forces should not be extended, that the Turkish enclaves should immediately be evacuated by the Greeks, and that a further conference should be held at Geneva with the two Cypriot communities present to restore peace and re-establish constitutional government.

In advance of this two further observations were made, one calling for the Greek Cypriots to allow the Turkish Vice-President to resume his functions, the other noting "the existence in practice of two autonomous administrations, that of the Greek Cypriot community and that of the Turkish Cypriot community."

A third round of talks then took place between 31 July and 2 August 1975. There was a momentary glimmer of hope that a real breakthrough in the negotiations was about to take place.

Negotiations took part between Rauf Denktaş and Makarios III on a Voluntary Exchange of Populations under the auspices of the United Nations. To avoid any further incident such as that of 25 June 1975 or 10 November 1974, Makarios III relented and agreed to a comprehensive population exchange whereby Turkish Cypriots and Greek Cypriots would be transferred to the north and the south of the island respectively, with the assistance of the UN.

The Third Vienna Agreement was signed.

On the basis of this agreement, the displacement of 201,000 Greek Cypriots from the north was formalized. In addition, 45,000 Turkish Cypriots living in the south moved to the north with the aid of the UNFICYP.
