= Sevgül Uludağ =

Turkish Cypriot journalist, writer and activist (1958–2026)

Sevgül Uludağ (Turkish pronunciation: [ˈuɫudaː]; 15 October 1958 – 28 June 2026) was a Turkish Cypriot journalist and pro-peace activist.

== Life and career ==
Born in Nicosia on 15 October 1958, Uludağ worked in a bank and later as a proofreader before becoming a journalist in 1980. Working as an investigative reporter, she was instrumental in uncovering information on thousands of missing Cypriots and mass graves in Cyprus. In addition, she also wrote a number of books.

She was a 2008 Courage in Journalism Award laureate, the first Cypriot winner of this award. She co-founded two NGOs, Hands Across the Divide, and the Women's Research Centre in Nicosia. Uludağ was nominated for the Nobel Peace Prize in 2019 for her work on missing people and refugees on the island of Cyprus.

Uludağ died on 28 June 2026, at the age of 67.

== Selected works ==
- Oysters with the Missing Pearls (2005)
- Orphans of Nationalism (2008)

== See also ==
- List of massacres in Cyprus
