= Cypriot refugees =

Residents of the island of Cyprus displaced by the unresolved conflict

Cypriot refugees are the Cypriot nationals or Cyprus residents who had their main residence (as opposed to merely owning property) in an area forcibly evacuated during the Cyprus conflict. The government of Cyprus also recognizes as refugees the descendants of the original refugees in the male line regardless of place of birth.

== 1963–74 background ==
Tension began in 1963 when Makarios proposed thirteen amendments to the constitution of the Republic of Cyprus. Turkish Cypriots were opposed to the proposal since they viewed it as an attempt to remove their constitutional safeguards that Greek Cypriots had claimed to be problematic in the conduct of government. On 21 December 1963, clashes between Greek Cypriots and Turkish Cypriots erupted unleashed a wave of violence across the island. Facing violence from Greek Cypriot paramilitaries, in favour of unification with Greece (Enosis), thousands of Turkish Cypriots fled their properties to enclaves with Turkish Cypriot majorities, protected by Turkish troops. By 1974, an attempted coup sponsored by the military Greek military junta of 1967–1974 then ruling Greece, trying to overthrow the Cypriot government and unite the island with Greece, was met with a military invasion of the island by Turkey, which claimed it was acting as a guarantor power to prevent annexation of the island. Turkey's subsequent decades-long occupation of northern Cyprus has attracted widespread international condemnation.

== Post–1974 ==
Turkey, in the 1974 Turkish invasion of Cyprus, advanced to occupy about 38% of the island in the north of the Republic of Cyprus and thus transforming the Turkish Cypriot objective of Taksim (partition of the island of Cyprus into Turkish and Greek portions, a concept declared as early as 1957 by Fazil Küçük) into reality. Greek Cypriots in the north (nearly half the Greek Cypriot population of the island) were forced by the advancing Turkish Army to flee south. Likewise, Turkish Cypriots who had not already fled to the enclaves during the intercommunal violence now chose to do so.

It is estimated that 40% of the Greek population of Cyprus, as well as the Turkish Cypriot population, were displaced by the Turkish invasion. The figures for internally displaced Cypriots varies, the United Peacekeeping force in Cyprus (UNFICYP) estimates 165,000 Greek Cypriots and 45,000 Turkish Cypriots. The UNHCR registers slightly higher figures of 200,000 and 65,000 respectively, being partly based on official Cypriot statistics which register children of displaced families as refugees.

On August 2, 1975, the two parties reached in Vienna the Voluntary Exchange of Population Agreement, implemented under United Nations auspices. In accordance with this Agreement, Turkish Cypriots remaining in the south moved to the North and Greek Cypriots remaining in the north moved to the south with the exception of a few hundred Greek Cypriots who chose to reside in the north. After that, the separation of the two communities via the UN-patrolled Green Line prohibited the return of all internally displaced people.

Through the years, multiple demonstrations and rallies have been made by the Greek Cypriots demanding to return to their properties, such as the 1996 demonstrations by thousands of Greek Cypriot women attempting to return to their homes and properties in 1989 without success. A number of Greek Cypriots chose to take their case to the European Court of Human Rights filing against Turkey and argued their homes are being occupied by migrant workers brought from Turkey with the intention of altering the demographics of the island.

In 1990, applications filed with the European Court of Human Rights on behalf of 18 Greek Cypriots in the case of Varnava and Others v. Turkey, resulted in a decision on 18 September 2009 which ordered Turkey to pay €12,000 within three months to every applicant for non-pecuniary damages and €8,000 for costs and expenses.

In 1999, UNHCR halted its assistance activities for internally displaced persons in Cyprus.

Neither the Greek Cypriot or Turkish Cypriot displaced populations are considered to be in any need of humanitarian aid. The Greek Cypriot government instituted a program of housing and aid for the displaced. This housing programme was giving Turkish Cypriot refugee properties to the displaced Greek Cypriots. They were also benefitting from the boom in tourism across the south of the island.

Turkish Cypriot relief came mainly in the form of economic aid from Turkey as well as the allocation of formerly Greek Cypriot owned houses and property. Both sides had the same housing programme, taking use of the abandoned properties.

In April 2003, the Turkish Cypriot President Rauf Denktaş opened the border crossing for the first time since the island was divided, allowing both Greek and Turkish Cypriots to view their property for the first time since the separation of the two communities. Crossing procedures have since been relaxed allowing Cypriots from both communities to move relatively freely across the island.

It was hoped that Cyprus's accession to the European Union would provide an impetus for reunification of the island and, in 2004, the UN-backed Annan plan was put to referendums on both sides of the island. The plan envisaged a bicommunal, bizonal, federal state, with territorial concessions by the Turkish Cypriot side but only a limited right of return for displaced Greek Cypriots. The plan was accepted by the Turkish Cypriots but rejected by Greek Cypriots. Cyprus later entered the EU as a divided island. A new round of talks was initiated in 2008 between the leaders of the two Cypriot communities, Dimitris Christofias and Mehmet Ali Talat.

== Legal action ==
=== Toumazou et al. v. Republic of Turkey et al. ===
In October 2009, a lawsuit was brought against the TRNC Representative Offices and HSBC in Washington for the sale of Greek-Cypriot properties in Northern Cyprus. On 30 September 2014, the court dismissed the case with prejudice for lack of jurisdiction.

== Legal status of the displaced Greek Cypriots and Turkish Cypriots ==
The displaced Greek Cypriots and Turkish Cypriots fell under the UN definition of "internally displaced persons". The government of USA considers Greek Cypriots displaced as a result of the 1974 division of the island to be "refugees".

== See also ==
- Loizidou v. Turkey a landmark refugee legal case
- Greco-Turkish relations
- United Nations High Commissioner for Refugees Representation in Cyprus
- List of massacres in Cyprus
