= 1964 Famagusta incident =

Ethnic clashes in Cyprus

| Date | 11 May 1964 |
| Location | Famagusta in Cyprus |
| Result | Massacres of Turkish Cypriots occurred in island |

Belligerents
| Cyprus: EOKA | Turkish Cypriots |

Casualties and losses
| 2 Greek Cypriot officers and a policeman killed | 28 Turkish Cypriot civilians at total killed in following massacres |

The 1964 Famagusta incident was an ethnic clash which occurred in Famagusta, Cyprus in May of 1964 between the Greek Cypriot Militia and Turkish Cypriots.

== Incidents ==
=== 11 May ===
On May 11, 1964, in Famagusta, 2 Greek Cypriot officers and a policeman were killed by Turkish Cypriot separatists. One of the victims were Kostakis Pandelidis, son of the Nicosia Police Chief.

=== 12 May ===
Following the murder, Greek Cypriot security forces who were ordered to "Kill 10 Turks for each slain Greek" entered the town to investigate the murder. 17 Turks that weren't related to the murder were abducted the same day, and was executed by a firing squad in Famagusta.

=== 13 May ===
A massacre of Turks in British bases of Akrotiri and Dhekelia occurred 2 days after the murder. 11 Turks working in the area were killed. Their remains were found in 2006. Perpetrators of the massacres were identified as Greek Cypriot police and colleagues of the victims who were radicalised by Radical Ex-EOKA members.

== See also ==
- Cyprus conflict
- Constantinople pogroms
- List of massacres in Cyprus
