= Aloda =

Aloda: Αλόδα (Greek); Atlılar (Turkish)
- Village
- Location in Cyprus
- Coordinates: 35°12′33″N 33°49′34″E
- Country (de jure): Cyprus
  - District: Famagusta District
- Country (de facto): Northern Cyprus
  - District: Gazimağusa District
- Time zone: UTC+2 (EET)
  - Summer (DST): UTC+3 (EEST)

Aloda (Greek: Αλόδα; Turkish: Atlılar) is a small village located in the Famagusta District of Cyprus five km west of Agios Sergios. It is under the de facto control of Northern Cyprus. The village was inhabited by Turkish Cypriots before 1974. 37 of the inhabitants were killed by EOKA-B during Maratha, Santalaris and Aloda massacre in 1974 and only three could escape.
