= Tochni massacre =

Massacre of 84 Turkish Cypriots in Cyprus in 1974

- Part of atrocities against Turkish Cypriots during the Turkish invasion of Cyprus
- Location: Tochni, Larnaca, Cyprus
- Date: August 14, 1974; 52 years ago
- Target: Turkish Cypriots
- Attack type: Massacre
- Weapon: Guns
- Deaths: 84
- Perpetrator: Greek Cypriot members of the EOKA B
- Motive: Anti-Turkish sentiment

The Tochni massacre refers to the killing of 84 Turkish Cypriots from the village of Tochni, Larnaca, Cyprus by Greek Cypriot members of EOKA B during the Turkish invasion of Cyprus in the summer of 1974.

== Background ==
During the Turkish invasion at the north of the island, members of the Greek Cypriot paramilitary group EOKA B took more than 80 Turkish Cypriot men from the village of Tochni and the nearby village of Zygi hostage, including minors. After being kept at a Greek elementary school during the night, the arrested Turkish Cypriots were boarded into a bus. According to the only survivor of the massacre, Suat Hussein Kafadar, the Turks were taken to the village of Palodia, where they were executed with automatic guns.

The total number of victims is 84 (78 from Tochni and 6 from Zygi). At the school where the prisoners were being held, according to Kafadar, there was a Greek officer. Kafadar said in an interview that a Greek military officer with three stars spoke with them during the night and reassured them that they would not get hurt. "Friends, don't be afraid. Today you are prisoners, tomorrow we might be prisoners. In the army, nobody abuses captives." The officer then departed, before the prisoners were taken to the massacre site. In a later interview, Kafadar stated that the perpetrators had acted without orders from their superiors, recalling that they hurriedly left the scene to avoid being discovered.

The atrocity took place the same day as the massacre of Maratha, Santalaris and Aloda, again by Greek Cypriots members of EOKA B.

In 2016, Former Minister of Foreign Affairs of Cyprus Erato Kozakou-Marcoullis, said "I apologize to the Turkish Cypriots for 126 women and children killed in Aloda, Maratha and Santalaris and 85 civilian men killed in Tochni as a result of the horrific murders committed by EOKA B extremists on 14 August 1974.".

== See also ==
- Alaminos massacre
- Constantinople pogroms
- Cyprus conflict
- Maratha, Santalaris and Aloda massacre
- List of massacres in Cyprus
