= Edeköy massacre =

Massacre of Turkish civilians during the First Balkan War

- Part of Persecution of Muslims during the Ottoman contraction
- Native name: Edeköy katliamı
- Location: Edeköy, Meriç
- Date: November 1912
- Target: Turks of Edeköy
- Attack type: massacre, execution, rape, looting
- Victim: 1,659
- Perpetrators: Greek gangs and Bulgarian gangs Bulgarian army (Turkish claim)
- Motive: Anti-Turkish sentiment, Islamophobia

Edeköy massacre (Turkish: Edeköy katliamı) was a massacre of Turkish civilians that took place during the First Balkan War. It was committed by the Greek gangs and the Bulgarian army in the village of Edeköy.

The village was located near the river of Meriç and was entirely Turkish settlement, consisting of 200 families. It was close to the Greek village of Soufli. There was a trade between the two villages before the massacre. Soufli, although was in the Ottoman Empire, it was controlled by Greek gangs. On 10 October 1912, the Bulgarian 10th Cavalry Brigade under Tanev took control over Soufli. A report made by the local Greeks about atrocities committed by the Edeköy Turks in Soufli and nearby Christian villages was presented to Tanev. According to Ottoman sources, people of Soufli decided to give 800 liras to Tanev, so he can be on their side.

The massacre lasted a week, beginning on 13 November when Tanev disarmed people of Edeköy. While Turks were ready to defend their village, the müftü convinced them to give their weapons to Bulgarians and Greeks. According to Lyubomir Miletich, the massacre took place between 1 and 8 November and was committed by Greek gangs and was stopped by the Nova Zagora Regiment on 9 November.

The women and men were separated; the women were locked in two different houses and the men in a mosque; they were told that they would be questioned in connection with the accusations of the Greek gangs. However, there they were massacred and their remains thrown in the wells of Edeköy. Some of the victims were refugees from the nearby villages of Vakıf, Ahrenpınar, Demirören, Dişbudak. According to Mehmet Rüştü's report from 1913, out of 150 wells in the village, only 7 were usable. The rest have been covered to prevent the smell of corpses. Their houses were looted, and only 1 mosque, 3 shops, and 1 inn survived.

According to Shopov, the administrator of Agricultural Bank of Soufli: "After the massacre, the Greeks wanted to burn down the village. I personally visited the village on March 25, 1913 and some Turkish women, who were wounded and cut, but managed to hide, were still being treated. Our soldiers found terrible things: the corpses formed whole mounds; the wells were full of corpses. Now because of this, the wells there are filled up. The Turks who were captured were taken to boats and there they were slaughtered and thrown into the Maritsa. One, not yet killed, escaped by swimming. His name was Palauzi Ahmed. Because of this Greek massacre, the Soufli Greeks were very afraid during the interregnum, lest the Turks take revenge on them. But because there was a kind of secret alliance between Turks and Greeks at that time, the Greek civil committee in Soufli immediately requested that a Turkish army be sent from Dimotika to Soufli to protect the Greeks. This they achieved with a lot of bribery, and they apologized to the Turks for the Edeköy massacre, saying that Bulgarian committees had led them. That is how they saved themselves."

According to Gelibolu Gendarmerie Commander Mehmet Celal Bey on 2 August 1913: “all these cruelties and massacres were committed partly by the Bulgarian military and Bulgarian and Greek gangs of Malkara, Uzunköprü, Keşan, Dimetoka, Sofulu, Ortaköy, Gümülcine, Dedeağaç and Sancak, all supported by the nobles and wealthy. Unimaginable atrocities, ugliness and cruelties were committed against Muslim villages, which even the savages of ancient times would not have seen fit to do, and even babies in their cradles were massacred. Ninety percent of Muslim villages were burned, destroyed, looted and razed to the ground. I have been investigating by seeing and listening for a week. I have examined this information and determined it through telegraph reports and writings. I present my report on the Sofulu district cases."

According to Miletich, the massacre was more cruel than the Batak massacre.

== Death toll and survivors ==
According to Lybomir MIletich, 900 Turks were massacred, while Mehmet Rüştü states in his report that the number is 1,659 people. Other sources claim 2,018. 8-10 women managed to escape the massacre. According to Major Mehmet Şükrü, who witnessed the aftermath, 8-years-old Mustafa, who was severely injured managed to escape together with other people who were tied up and thrown to Meriç river.

== Aftermath ==
After the massacre, Edeköy was considered a deserted settlement by the Ottoman administration. No money in the following years was sent to the village and the Edeköy District Manager Talat Bey was appointed as to Vize District Governorship in 1915. After the Meriç River flood in 1939, Edeköy was totally abandoned, since its people moved to Kadıköy and renamed it to Kadıdondurma.

== Other massacres ==
According to Mehmet Rüştü, the massacres in Thrace continued. In Çamköy 150 people, in Kalaycıoba 250 people, in Katrancı 250 people, in Mukataa 150 people, in Demirören 300 people and Hancağız 100 people were massacred.

== See also ==
- Balkan Wars Memorial Cemetery in Edirne
- Muhacır
- Persecution of Muslims during the Ottoman contraction
- Petrovo massacre
