= Alaminos massacre =

Massacre of Cypriot Turkish civilians

- Part of atrocities against Turkish Cypriots during the Turkish invasion of Cyprus
- Location: Alaminos, Larnaca, Cyprus
- Date: 20 July 1974
- Victims: 13 or 14 or 15 Turkish men
- Perpetrators: Cypriot Greeks, mainland Greeks
- Motive: Anti-Turkish sentiment, Islamophobia, Greek nationalism, Hellenization

Alaminos massacre (Turkish: Aleminyo katliamı) was a massacre of 13 or 15 Cypriot Turkish civilians in the village of Alaminos which happened on 20 July 1974. A year later the survivors of the massacre fled to Kythrea.

== The massacre ==
The massacre, which lasted half an hour, was committed by the 395th division of EOKA-B and Greek Cypriote National Guard in the mixed village of Alaminos, as a result of the 1974 Turkish invasion of the island. It was directed against the Turkish Cypriot men who were defending the village. When the Turkish Cypriots were defeated, Greeks took hostage Turkish women, children and elderly in the local Greek school, while the men, due to their refusal to surrender, were lined up against a wall and executed by shooting. Total of 13 or 14 or 15 men, between the ages of 25 and 53 were killed and buried by a bulldozer in a mass grave.

According to Ahmed Ibrahim, a native of Alaminos: “A group of six Greeks with automatic weapons came up behind the men. They were no more than 20 feet away. They shot 14 of them in the back. I could hear it from my house.”

An investigation was launched in 2012 by the Greek side and the investigating process is still ongoing. According to the investigation two soldiers were the main perpetrators of the massacre; one of them was codenamed Psia Psias from the nearby Kazoto village.

One of the victims was Kudret Özersoy's father. He commented: "our goal is not to create hatred out of what has happened in the past but to take lessons from (past) mistakes to ensure that everybody sees the truth."

== Victims ==
13 of the victims were identified by their DNA, while two men are still missing. The identified victims were buried in the Lefkoşa Cemetery in a military style. Their names are: Tahir Osman Kaptanoğlu, Hasan Ali Kandıralı, Ali Hasan Cenk, Güney Hüseyin Alaminyolu, Zafer Hasan İmamoğlu, Osman Mehmet Reis, Mehmet Ali Bodo, Ali Ali Bodo, Hüseyin Dildar Özersay, Hasan Dildar Özersay, Ahmet Halil Alkım, Mustafa Ali Taşbel, Ömer Ali Taşbel.

== Legacy ==
Every year the 15 victims of the massacre and another 5 victims, who were massacred in 1967 in Alaminos by Greek Cypriots, are remembered in Kythrea.

== See also ==
- Cyprus conflict
- List of massacres in Cyprus
- Constantinople pogroms
