= Abortion in Cyprus =

Abortion in Cyprus can since 2018 be performed on request up until the 12th week of pregnancy and until the 19th week in rape cases. It was previously performed only if there was a risk of physical or mental harm to the mother, a risk of fetal deformity, or if the patient was raped or otherwise sexually assaulted.

While there is no specific guideline limiting when an abortion is permitted under Cypriot law, in practice no abortions are performed after the 28th week. Cyprus has a natalist policy and thus will not provide routine abortion procedures in state hospitals, so they are typically performed in private clinics, with hospitals only providing the procedure if the mother is at great risk. As abortions are paid out of pocket by the woman undergoing the procedure, private practitioners can and have performed abortions outside the legal framework.
