= Maratha, Cyprus =

Village in Famagusta district, Cyprus

Maratha: Μαράθα (Greek); Muratağa (Turkish)
- Village
- Location in Cyprus
- Coordinates: 35°12′42″N 33°46′34″E
- Country (de jure): Cyprus
  - District: Famagusta District
- Country (de facto): Northern Cyprus
  - District: Gazimağusa District
- Time zone: UTC+2 (EET)
  - Summer (DST): UTC+3 (EEST)

Maratha (Greek: Μαράθα; Turkish: Muratağa) is a small village located in the Famagusta District of Cyprus, 7 km south of Lefkoniko. It is under the de facto control of Northern Cyprus.

The village was recorded as early as the early 13th century in papal documents.

In 1974 a mass-grave containing the bodies of more than 80 murdered Turkish-Cypriots men, women and children was found here. These were the people who were massacred by the EOKA-B in the Maratha, Santalaris and Aloda massacre during the Turkish invasion of Cyprus.

== See also ==
- Santalaris
