= Santalaris =

Santalaris: Σανταλάρης (Greek); Sandallar (Turkish)
- Location in Cyprus
- Coordinates: 35°12′41″N 33°48′0″E
- Country (de jure): Cyprus
  - District: Famagusta District
- Country (de facto): Northern Cyprus
  - District: Gazimağusa District
- Time zone: UTC+2 (EET)
  - Summer (DST): UTC+3 (EEST)

Santalaris (Greek: Σανταλάρης; Turkish: Sandallar) is a small village located in the Famagusta District of Cyprus, north of Famagusta. The Turkish Cypriot inhabitants of the village were killed by EOKA-B during Maratha, Santalaris and Aloda massacre. Santalaris is under the de facto control of Northern Cyprus.

The village was recorded as early as the early 13th century in papal documents.

== See also ==
- Maratha, Cyprus
