= Tochni =

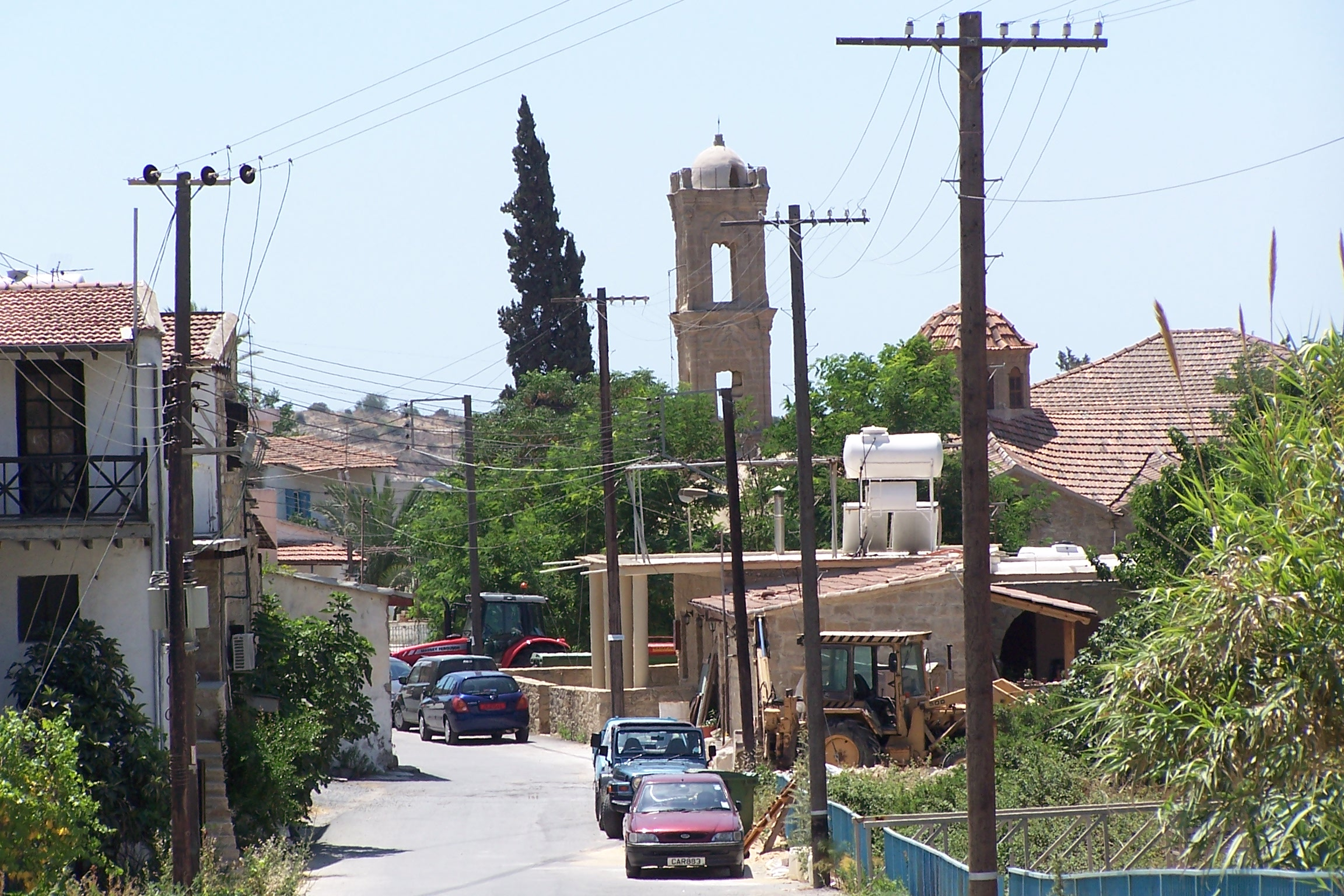
- A street in Tochni

- Location within Cyprus
- Coordinates: 34°46′50″N 33°19′24″E
- Country: Cyprus
- District: Larnaca District

Population (2011)
  - Total: 424
- Time zone: UTC+2 (EET)
  - Summer (DST): UTC+3 (EEST)

Tochni (Greek: Τόχνη; Turkish: Dohni or Taşkent) is a village located in the Larnaca District of Cyprus, about halfway between the cities of Larnaca and Limassol. Prior to 1974, Tochni had a mixed Greek-Cypriot and Turkish-Cypriot population. In August 1974, 85 Turkish Cypriot inhabitants of this village and of neighboring villages were massacred by Greek Cypriots in response to the Turkish invasion of the island. Later that month, the remaining Turkish residents of Tochni were evacuated using coaches and UN military vehicles. The evacuation was carried out by 7 Sqn RCT then serving with the UN at camp UNFICYP Nicosia.

There are the ruins of a Latin church in the centre of the village, overlooking the Orthodox church of St Constantine and Helena. The current church has been reconstructed on the site of the original, over a bridge, said to have been founded by St Helena on return from the Holy Land having brought with her a piece of the True Cross.

There is also a mosque, madrasah and Muslim burial ground in the eastern part of the village, though these are in varying degrees of disrepair.

Today the village has been designated a beautiful 'agrotourism' location which promotes the restoration of the original village house in order to preserve the traditional Cypriot stone houses. The majority of properties use 'Tochni Stone' which is quarried nearby.

Visitors can also enjoy the 2.8 km circular "Exploring Nature" trail or use the village as a base for cycling and hiking across the Mediterranean countryside.
