= EOKA B =

1971–1974 Greek Cypriot ultranationalist paramilitary organisation

- Leaders: George Grivas (until December 1973 where he became sick and later died in January of 1974); Athanasios Sklavenitis
- Dates active: 1971–1978
- Headquarters: Cyprus
- Ideology: Greek nationalism Enosis; Anti-communism; Anti-Turkish sentiment
- Political position: Far-right
- Wars: Cypriot intercommunal violence and Turkish invasion of Cyprus

EOKA-B or Ethniki Organosis Kyprion Agoniston B (EOKA B /eɪˈoʊkə/; Greek: Εθνική Οργάνωσις Κυπρίων Αγωνιστών, lit. 'National Organisation of Cypriot Fighters') was a Greek Cypriot paramilitary organisation formed in 1971 by General Georgios Grivas. It followed an ultra right-wing nationalistic ideology and had the ultimate goal of achieving the enosis (union) of Cyprus with Greece. During its short history, the organisation's chief aim was to block any attempt to enforce upon the Cyprus people what the organisation considered to be an unacceptable settlement to the Cyprus issue. In addition, the organisation drafted various plans to overthrow President Makarios. The organisation continued its activities until it officially declared its dissolution and disbanded on 11 February 1978.

Due to its attacks on civilians (Post Grivas), it was considered a criminal organization and was outlawed by the Republic of Cyprus after the death of George Grivas. Among the attacks it is responsible for is the Maratha, Santalaris and Aloda massacre. EOKA-B members were arrested for the kidnapping of the son of president Spyros Kyprianou and for being involved in the assassination of US ambassador Rodger Paul Davies. Homicide charges were dropped on 4 June 1977 by a Cypriot court against the two men accused of killing the ambassador. According to the Washington Post's 1970s Cyprus correspondent, Joseph W. Fitchett, EOKA-B members were "motivated by a mixture of patriotism, money and macho".

== Formation ==
EOKA-B was founded by General George Grivas as his last organizational attempt before his death on 17 January 1974. Grivas, a stridently anti-communist military leader during the Greek Civil War, was among the founders of EOKA in the early 1950s. After the declaration of independent Cyprus state he took over the Supreme Command of the Greek Cypriot forces organised under the National Guard as well as the Greek military division in early 1960s. Following Turkey's ultimatum of November 1967 he was recalled by the Greek junta to Athens, only to return under cover in 1971.

After Grivas returned to Cyprus in 1971, he created EOKA-B in response to President Archbishop Makarios' deviation from the policy of enosis in 1959 and the reaffirmation of this position during his re-election in 1968. Grivas, along with his new EOKA-B organisation, attempted to forcefully oust Makarios in order to enact his original goal of enosis with Greece.

Whereas EOKA (1955–1959) were seen by the majority of the Greek Cypriots as anti-colonialist freedom fighters, the EOKA-B did not have the overwhelming support of the Greek Cypriot population, as Makarios had called an election after a failed assassination attempt on him and his coalition won 27 out of the 35 seats. The main supporters of EOKA B were pro-enosis supporters who won 7 seats in the previous election, old EOKA fighters who felt they never received the recognition that they deserved after the revolt, right wing military personnel and some pro-enosis elements of the Church of Cyprus. The only armed, organized resistance to EOKA-B came from the Army Reserve, "Efedriko", a special police force set up by Makarios and the members of the Socialist Party EDEK as well as armed supporters of Makarios in every town. The Communist Party AKEL, despite the mild verbal opposition to EOKA-B, had not organized any form of resistance against it.

== Coup d'etat and Turkish invasion ==
When Grivas Digenis died from heart failure on 27 January 1974, the post-Grivas EOKA-B increasingly came under the direct control and influence of the military junta in Athens. EOKA-B was on the verge of dissolution by July 1974. Yet on 15 July 1974 the Greek dictator Dimitrios Ioannides used the National Guard which was led by Greek officers and consisted of Greek-Cypriot conscripts, and EOKA-B to launch a military coup. EOKA-B attempted to assassinate Makarios but failed, and he fled to London. Nikos Sampson was installed as the new president of Cyprus.

This action provoked a Turkish invasion of Cyprus on 20 July 1974, leading to the subsequent de facto division of the island. Ioannides was taken by surprise by the Turkish invasion and failed to convince or coerce the Greek generals to send military reinforcements to Cyprus. The subsequent toppling of the Greek junta led to Sampson's resignation on 23 July 1974.

On 14 August 1974, Turkey mounted an illegal second invasion into Cyprus. By the end of hostilities, about 180,000 Greek Cypriots (almost one third of the population), were forcibly uprooted from their homes and properties, while 80,000 Turkish Cypriots were forced north. Thousands more were killed or listed as missing.

=== Atrocities on 14 August 1974 ===
On 14 August, during the invasion, EOKA-B committed massacres and crimes against Turkish-Cypriots in Maratha, Santalaris, Aloda, Tochni and Kiti. They massacred 84 Turkish-Cypriot men and boys from the village of Tochni, leaving one survivor. 126 were killed in the villages of Maratha, Santalaris and Aloda.

=== Later testimony ===
On 17 April 1991, Ambassador Nelson Ledsky testified before the U.S. Senate Foreign Relations Committee that "most of the 'missing persons' disappeared in the first days of July 1974, before the Turkish invasion on the 20th. Many killed on the Greek side were killed by Greek Cypriots in fighting between supporters of Makarios and Sampson."

== See also ==
- EOKA
- Akamas
- Attilas '74
- Once Upon a Time in Cyprus
