= Bloody Christmas (1963) =

Inter-communal violence Cyprus

Bloody Christmas (Turkish: Kanlı Noel) refers to intercommunal violence between Turkish Cypriot and Greek Cypriot populations during the Cyprus crisis of 1963–64, on the night of 20–21 December 1963 and the subsequent period of island-wide violence amounting to civil war. This initial episode of violence lasted until 31 December and was somewhat subdued with the start of peace talks at the London Conference, but outbursts of violence continued thereafter. The violence precipitated the end of Turkish Cypriot representation in the Republic of Cyprus.

The death toll for the entire conflict between December and August amounts to 364 Turkish Cypriots and 174 Greek Cypriots, of whom 136 Turkish Cypriots and 30 Greek Cypriots were killed in the initial period between 21 December and 1 January.

Approximately 25,000 Turkish Cypriots from 104 villages, amounting to a quarter of the Turkish Cypriot population, fled their villages and were displaced into enclaves after TMT forced them to. Thousands of Turkish Cypriot houses left behind were ransacked or completely destroyed. Around 1,200 Armenian Cypriots and 500 Greek Cypriots were also displaced.

== Background ==
The Republic of Cyprus was established as a bi-communal unitary state in 1960. Neither of the two communities were happy with this situation as Greek Cypriots thought it was their right to unite Cyprus with Greece (enosis), while Turkish Cypriots in direct response to this push and the militant campaign of EOKA starting in 1955 strived for partition (taksim).

The first major crisis came in December 1961 when the Turks refused to vote for the budget as a reprisal for the Greek failure to fulfil certain obligations affecting Turkish interests in other spheres.

After two relatively peaceful years, in November 1963 tensions skyrocketed when President and Archbishop Makarios III proposed 13 constitutional changes for his consideration which were met with fury by Turkish Cypriots. Some of the suggestions were technical, a few had advantages for the Turks, others affected the perceived Turkish security. Nothing at this stage impinged upon the wider interests of Turkey under the Treaty of Guarantee but the Turkish Government saw the attempt to change the basic articles as a dangerous precedent and rejected the proposals. The Archbishop had made his move at a time when intercommunal tension was high. Both sides had been stockpiling arms since the Zürich agreement that led to Cyprus' independence and a clash was expected sooner or later.

== Events ==
=== 21 December: Eruption ===
The incident that sparked the events of Bloody Christmas occurred during the early hours of 21 December 1963. Greek Cypriot police operating within the old Venetian walls of Nicosia demanded to see the identification papers of some Turkish Cypriots who were returning home in a taxi from an evening out. These Turkish Cypriots were being driven by taxi driver Zeki Halil and were around Hermes Street en route to Taht-el Kale. When the police officers attempted to search the women in the car, Halil objected and a discussion ensued. Soon a crowd gathered and shots were fired.

Cemaliye Emirali, the ex-lover of Zeki Halil, who was similarly returning from a night out, saw the incident and got involved. Police called for reinforcements from Paphos Gate, and one of the reinforcements shot and killed Zeki Halil and Cemaliye Emirali. By dawn, two Turkish Cypriots had been killed and eight others, both Greek and Turkish Cypriots, had been wounded.

=== 21 to 23 December ===
After the shooting, crowds of Turkish Cypriots gathered in the northern part of Nicosia, often led by the Turkish Resistance Organisation (TMT). On 22 December, the funerals of the two Turkish Cypriots killed were held without incident. However, shooting broke out on the evening of 22 December. Cars full of armed Greek Cypriots roamed through the streets of Nicosia and fired indiscriminately, and Turkish Cypriots fired at patrolling police cars. Turkish Cypriot snipers fired from minarets and the roof of the Saray Hotel on Sarayönü Square. Some shooting spread to the suburbs and to Larnaca. The Greek Cypriot administration cut off telephone and telegraph lines to Turkish Cypriot quarters of the city of Nicosia and the police took control of the Nicosia International Airport. Greek paramilitary groups led by Nikos Sampson and Vassos Lyssarides were activated.

On 23 December, a ceasefire was agreed upon by Makarios III and Turkish Cypriot leadership. However, fighting continued and intensified in Nicosia and Larnaca. Machine guns were fired from mosques in Turkish-inhabited areas and later on 23 December, Greek Cypriot irregulars headed by Sampson came to assist in the battle of Omorphita, they attacked the suburb and eventually took it over with the Turkish Cypriot residents of the quarter later being expelled from their homes.

=== Later events ===
A number of Turkish Cypriot mosques, shrines and other places of worship were desecrated. Greek Cypriot irregulars attacked Turkish Cypriots in the mixed villages of Mathiatis on 23 December and Ayios Vasilios on 24 December. The entire Turkish Cypriot population of Mathiatis, 208 people, fled to nearby Turkish Cypriot villages.

Based on later interviews, reporter Harry Scott Gibbons described the murder of 21 Turkish Cypriot patients from the Nicosia General Hospital on Christmas Eve. This is taken as a fact in the Turkish Cypriot narrative, but is disputed in the Greek Cypriot narrative. An investigation of the incident by a Greek Cypriot source found that three Turkish Cypriots died, of which one died of a heart attack and the other two were shot by a "lone psychopath".

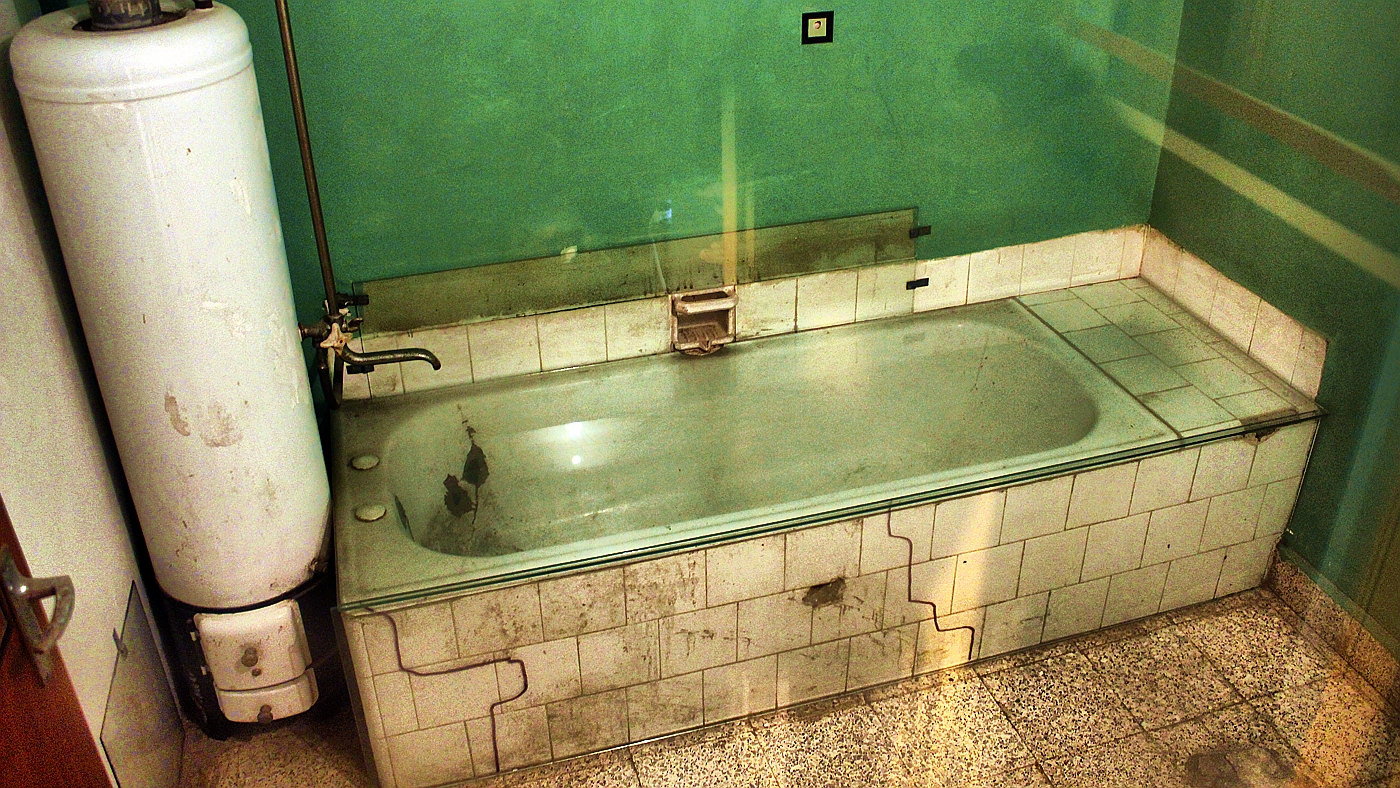
The bathtub where Mürüvet İlhan and children, Murat, Kutsi, and Hakan were killed. The house is preserved today as the Museum of Barbarism.

On 24 December 1963, 11 people were killed in the Kumsal district of Nicosia. Among them were four members of the family of Major Nihat İlhan, who had retired from the Turkish Army as a Medical Brigadier General and was serving with the 650-strong Turkish Cypriot Forces Regiment stationed in Cyprus under the 1960 agreements. His wife, Mürüvet İlhan, and their children, Murat, Kutsi, and Hakan, were found dead in the bathtub of İlhan's home. The house where the raid occurred was later opened to visitors as the Museum of Barbarism.

A joint call for calm was issued on 24 December by the governments of Turkey, Greece and the United Kingdom.

Further clashes took place in the pass linking Nicosia to Kyrenia through the Kyrenia Mountains. This pass had fallen under Turkish Cypriot control and came under intense attack on 26 December from the north, with the Greek Cypriot forces being commanded by a Greek officer from the mainland. Turkish Cypriot forces, mostly from the village of Agirda, managed to retain control of the pass, and one Turkish Cypriot was killed.

As Cyprus was falling into chaos, Greece, Turkey and Britain, with Makarios's approval, created a Joint Truce Force under the command of General Peter Young, whose goal was to maintain, or rather re-establish, law, order and peace in Cyprus. A conference held in London in January among the protagonists of the events, failed because of the maximalist positions of the leadership of Greek and Turkish Cypriots.

==== Mass grave of Ayios Vasilios ====
Greek Cypriot forces attacked the Turkish Cypriot village of Ayios Vasilios on 24 December. A mass grave was exhumed there on 12 January 1964 in the presence of foreign reporters, British Army officers and officials from the International Committee of the Red Cross. The bodies of 21 Turkish Cypriots were found in this grave. A number of the victims in the mass grave showed signs of torture, and observers noted that they appeared to have been shot with their hands and feet tied.

Various rationales have been put forward as motivators for this Greek Cypriot attack. The Greek Cypriot leadership at the time was particularly wary of the villagers of Ayios Vasilios and nearby Skylloura blocking the road from Nicosia to Myrtou, which would have represented a strategic disadvantage should the Turkish army have invaded at the time from the northern coast. There may also have been an element of revenge in response to previous killings of Greek Cypriots in the local area.

An investigating committee led by independent British investigators then linked the incident to an ostensible disappearance of Turkish Cypriot patients in the Nicosia General Hospital, but it was not determined until decades later that many of the bodies had been murdered elsewhere, stored in the hospital for a while and then buried in Ayios Vasilios. However, several of the village's residents were also amongst those killed by Greek Cypriots. The exhumed bodies were interred by the Turkish Cypriot authorities to the yard of the Mevlevi Tekke in Nicosia. The bodies were exhumed in the 2010s by the Missing Persons Committee, the eight villagers of Ayios Vasilios identified and buried individually.

== Legacy ==
The Republic of Cyprus states that between 21 December 1963 and 10 August 1964, 191 Turkish Cypriots were killed and 173 went missing, presumed killed, while Greek Cypriots suffered 133 killed and 41 missing, presumed killed. Overall, 364 Turkish Cypriots and 174 Greek Cypriots were killed in the 1963–64 conflict. Around 25,000 Turkish Cypriots from 104 different villages abandoned their homes. These consisted of 72 mixed and 24 Turkish Cypriot villages that were completely evacuated and 8 mixed villages that were partially evacuated. The displacement amounted to a quarter of the Turkish Cypriot population. Approximately 1,200 Armenian Cypriots and 500 Greek Cypriots were also displaced.

The events of the Bloody Christmas abruptly brought about the end of the power-sharing arrangement in the government of Cyprus, leaving the police and civil service to become de facto Greek Cypriot organisations. This was mainly because Turkish Cypriots felt too unsafe to leave their local areas and go to work in Greek Cypriot-majority places, particularly because of revenge murders caused by the anti-Turkish Cypriot broadcasts on Greek-language radio. This also prompted Greek Cypriot employers to lay off their Turkish Cypriot employees, while some Turkish Cypriots resigned their positions of their own volition.

Most of the property abandoned by Turkish Cypriots was ransacked, damaged, burned or destroyed by Greek Cypriots. A 1964 United Nations report that used aerial photographs determined that at least 977 Turkish Cypriot homes had been destroyed and that 2,000 Turkish Cypriot homes had suffered severe damage and ransacking. The report by the UN Secretary General on 10 September 1964 gives the number of destroyed houses as 527 and the number of looted houses as 2,000. This included 50 totally destroyed and 240 partially destroyed houses in Omorfita and the surrounding suburbs, and 38 totally and 122 partially destroyed houses and shops in the town of Paphos.

== Historiography and commemoration ==
It is generally accepted on both sides of the island that the event is clearly not an occasion for celebration, less importantly by association with the issue of inter-communal violence and what that led to, and more so by its own string of tragic events. It is also often considered to contribute to reflections that the island of Cyprus is still divided more than 50 years later, which is a constant reminder to both sides that there has hardly been any joint communal achievement since, and is therefore seen by many as a time for reflection and trying to find a solution for future generations.

Turkish Cypriots annually, and officially, commemorate 1963 as 'Kanlı Noel' (Bloody Christmas) on 21 December, as a collective tragedy, for which Greek Cypriots have no official commemoration. The anniversary is commemorated by Turkish Cypriots as the 'week of remembrance' and the 'martyrs' struggle of 1963–1974', and follows the TRNC's Independence Day, which is on 15 November and is marked by protests in the south.

There are those on both sides that view these commemorations or lack thereof as issues for contention during Cyprus peace talks. It is often the case that the few public gestures made by Turkish and Greek Cypriot officials that signal possible reunification are often contradicted by these elements which have the effect of reinforcing the conflict mentality.

=== Greek Cypriot official view ===
Following the crisis, the official Greek Cypriot and Greek historiography contended that the resumption of violence was a result of a "Turkish mutiny" (Greek: Τουρκανταρσία, Tourkantarsia) against the lawful government of the Republic of Cyprus. Official Greek Cypriot propaganda works at the time highlighted what they claimed to be "barbaric" Turkish Cypriot actions and the "heroic" actions of the Greek Cypriots against them. This approach is exemplified in the first meeting of the now solely Greek Cypriot House of Representatives after the conflict, on 9 March 1964. During the conflict, enmity amongst the Greek Cypriot populace was also stoked by radio broadcasts that depicted the conflict as a Turkish Cypriot revolt with the intention of provoking a Turkish invasion of the island. This line contrasts with the popular name of the events amongst Greek Cypriots, "the Troubles" (φασαρίες, fasaries).

Cypriot politician and political scientist Niyazi Kızılyürek highlights the "borderline racist" language of these propaganda works and states that a fabricated narrative became the common perception amongst the entirety of the Greek Cypriot elite of the time. Anthropologist Olga Demetriou has described the Greek Cypriot official discourse regarding the events of Bloody Christmas as one that "in a sense, parallels denialist strategies that, for example and albeit in cruder form, draw on the battle of Van in 1915 to present Armenians as aggressors against Turks and deny the genocide." According to Demetriou, this is still reflected in the Greek Cypriot history textbooks today, and has the effect of presenting the Greek Cypriots as the victims of Turkish Cypriot aggression, although the majority of the victims were Turkish Cypriot. According to Yannis Papadakis, Greek Cypriot schoolbooks describe the 1960s as "a period of aggression by the 'Turks' (Turkey and Turkish Cypriots) against the 'Greeks'", though the Turkish Cypriots suffered heavier losses in the conflict. This has been used by the Republic of Cyprus to legitimise human rights violations against Turkish Cypriots, the suspension of their political rights, and, until 2003, the exclusion of Turkish Cypriots from the framing of the missing people by the Republic of Cyprus. In 2004, Greek Cypriot President Tassos Papadopoulos said in an interview that no Turkish Cypriots were killed between 1963 and 1974. Reaction to this claim appeared in the Greek and Turkish Cypriot media, with some Greek Cypriot media calling Papadopoulos's claim a blatant lie.

Demetriou contends that the use of the term "Turkish mutiny" (Tourkantarsia) to describe the events of 1963–64 contributes to the Greek Cypriot narrative that the Cyprus problem started in 1974, under which the Greek Cypriot and Armenian Cypriot people displaced in 1963–64 are not classified as "refugees" but as "those struck by the Turks" (Τουρκόπληκτοι, Tourkopliktoi).

== See also ==
- Cypriot intercommunal violence
- Constantinople pogroms
- 1964 Famagusta incident
- Cyprus problem
- List of massacres in Cyprus
- List of massacres of Turkish people
- Northern Cyprus
- Akritas plan

== Sources ==
- Bayrak (22 January 2018). "Final farewell to martyrs".
- Birkett, Dea (17 July 1999). "Split for infinity?". The Guardian.
- Borowiec, Andrew (2000). Cyprus: A Troubled Island. Greenwood Publishing Group. ISBN 9780275965334.
- Bryant, Rebecca (2012). Displacement in Cyprus Consequences of Civil and Military Strife Report 2 Life Stories: Turkish Cypriot Community (PDF). Oslo: PRIO Cyprus Centre.
- Bryant, Rebecca; Papadakis, Yiannis, eds. (2012). Cyprus and the Politics of Memory: History, Community and Conflict. I.B.Tauris. ISBN 978-1780761077.
- Charalambous, Loucas (12 September 2004). "Does the President have memory problems?". Cyprus Mail. Archived from the original on 5 February 2020.
- Crawshaw, Nancy (1978). "An Account of the Struggle for Union with Greece". The Cyprus Revolt (Hard cover ed.). London, England: Routledge UK. pp. 365–366. ISBN 9781032163352.
- Demetriou, Olga (2006). "EU and the Cyprus Conflict: Perceptions of the border and Europe in the Cyprus conflict" (PDF).
- Demetriou, Olga (2014). "'Struck by the Turks': reflections on Armenian refugeehood in Cyprus". Patterns of Prejudice. 48 (2): 167–181. doi:10.1080/0031322X.2014.905369.
- Goktepe, Cihat (2013). British Foreign Policy Towards Turkey, 1959-1965. Routledge. ISBN 978-1135294144.
- Hadjipavlou, Maria (2016). The Walls between Conflict and Peace. BRILL. p. 207. ISBN 978-9004272859.
- Havadis (21 December 2014). "Her şey buradan başladı [Everything started here]". Havadis. The paper summarises a book by Tzambazis, who investigated this precise event using police records and eyewitness accounts.
- Hazou, Elias (2013). "1963 is still a historical minefield". Cyprus Mail.
- Hoffmeister, Frank (2006). Legal aspects of the Cyprus problem: Annan Plan and EU accession. EMartinus Nijhoff Publishers. ISBN 978-90-04-15223-6.
- Ioannou, Gregoris (2020). The normalisation of Cyprus' partition among Greek Cypriots : political economy and political culture in a divided society. Cham, Switzerland: Springer Nature. ISBN 9783030508166.
- Ker-Lindsay, James (April 2009). Britain and the Cyprus Crisis 1963-1964. Bibliopolis. ISBN 978-3-447-05973-2.
- Ker-Lindsay, James (2011). The Cyprus Problem: What Everyone Needs to Know. Oxford University Press. ISBN 978-0199757152.
- Keser, Ulvi (2013). "Bloody Christmas of 1963 in Cyprus in the Light of American Documents". Journal of Modern Turkish History Studies. XIII (26): 249–271. Archived from the original on 8 November 2018.
- Kızılyürek, Niyazi (2016). Bir Hınç ve Şiddet Tarihi: Kıbrıs'ta Statü Kavgası ve Etnik Çatışma (in Turkish). Istanbul: Istanbul Bilgi University Press. ISBN 978-605-399-404-6.
- Kovras, Iosif (2014). Truth Recovery and Transitional Justice: Deferring Human Rights Issues. Routledge. ISBN 978-1136186851.
- Lieberman, Benjamin (2013). Terrible Fate: Ethnic Cleansing in the Making of Modern Europe. Rowman & Littlefield. p. 264. ISBN 9781442230385.
- Oberling, Pierre (1982). The Road to Bellapais: The Turkish Cypriot exodus to northern Cyprus. ISBN 978-0880330008.
- O'Malley, Brendan; Craig, Ian (1999). The Cyprus Conspiracy: America, Espionage and the Turkish Invasion. I.B. Tauris.
- Papadakis, Yiannis (2005). Echoes from the Dead Zone: Across the Cyprus Divide. I.B.Tauris. p. 149. ISBN 978-1850434283.
- Papadakis, Yiannis (2008). "Narrative, Memory and History Education in Divided Cyprus: A Comparison of Schoolbooks on the "History of Cyprus"". History & Memory. 20 (2): 128. doi:10.2979/his.2008.20.2.128. S2CID 159912409.
- Patrick, Richard Arthur (1976). Political geography and the Cyprus conflict, 1963–1971. Dept. of Geography, Faculty of Environmental Studies, University of Waterloo. ISBN 9780921083054.
- Richter, Heinz (2010). A Concise History of Modern Cyprus, 1878–2009. Verlag Franz Philipp Rutzen. ISBN 978-3-938646-53-3.
- Risini, Isabella (2018). The Inter-State Application under the European Convention on Human Rights: Between Collective Enforcement of Human Rights and International Dispute Settlement. BRILL. p. 117. ISBN 9789004357266.
- Soulioti, Stella (1996). Fettered Independence. Minneapolis, United States: Minnesota Mediterranean and East European Monographs.
- Smit, Anneke (2012). The Property Rights of Refugees and Internally Displaced Persons: Beyond Restitution. Routledge. p. 51. ISBN 9781136331435.
- Stavrinides, Zenon (Spring 2009). "Dementia Cypria: On the Social Psychological Environment of the Intercommunal Negotiations". The Cyprus Review. 21 (1): 175–186.
- Tzermias, Pavlos N. Tzermias (2001). Ιστορία της Κυπριακής Δημοκρατίας (History of the Republic of Cyprus). Vol. 2. Libro Publications.
- United Nations (10 September 1964). "REPORT BY THE SECRETARY-GENERAL ON THE UNITED NATIONS OPERATION IN CYPRUS" (PDF).
- Yakinthou, Christalla (15 August 2009). Political Settlements in Divided Societies: Consociationalism and Cyprus. Palgrave Macmillan. ISBN 9780230223752.
