= Battle of Omorphita =

1963 battle between Greek and Turkish Cypriots

- Part of Crisis of 1963
Date	23–26 December 1963
Location	Omorphita, Cyprus 35°11′30″N 33°22′30″E
Result	Greek Victory

Belligerents
Cyprus	Turkish Cypriots; Turkish Resistance Organisation

Commanders and leaders
(Cyprus) Tassos Markou (Cyprus) Nikos Sampson (Cyprus) Georgios Olympios	Unknown

Units involved
Organisation Akritas: Greek Cypriot Volunteers	Turkish Resistance Organisation (TMT): Turkish Cypriot Volunteers

Strength
77	Unknown

Casualties and losses
Few killed 3 missing	More than 92 killed More than 475 injured Hundreds captives

The Battle of Omorphita was an armed engagement between Greek Cypriot and Turkish Cypriot militias in December 1963 in the Cypriot town of Omorphita, part of the crisis of 1963.

== Background ==
On December 21, 1963, Greek Cypriot police officers stopped two Turkish Cypriots in their vehicles near the Turkish quarter of the Nicosia city and requested they present their IDs, the two refused and soon a crowd of Turks began gathering, and two people were shot and killed. Soon after, as news of this event began spreading, almost the entire island erupted in chaos with organizations on both sides beginning to fire and get into battle positions.

Omorphita was a majority Turkish Cypriot town at the time of these events and as a result of this, at the beginning of the fighting between the two sides, they held a considerable advantage in terms of strength against the Greek Cypriots in the area.

== Siege ==
The siege began on the 23 of December 1963 when Turkish paramilitaries, mainly belonging to TMT began firing on the Greek Cypriots in the area and (later) with aid from the Cyprus Turkish Regiment, tried to overrun the Greek outposts which were being held by an officer of the Cypriot Army (Predecessor of the Cypriot National Guard), Lieutenant Giorgios Olympiou and his volunteers of around 36 men.

The Turkish Cypriot attack was heavy and encircled the Greek fighters and by the evening, their ammunition was running low and as such, a message was communicated to the Greek headquarters that Olympious men were in dire need of assistance.

== Greek Cypriot counterattack ==
On December 24, under the leadership of EOKA veteran Nikos Sampson, and in coordination with Lieutenant Georgios Olympiou, Sampson organised a team of around 41 men (including himself) and they began to move towards the town to aid Olympiou and his volunteers of around 36 men. There was heavy fighting on that day and by December 25–26, after the Turkish Air Force flew over the island using F-104 Starfighters and F-100 Super Sabres, the Greek paramilitaries had successfully forced the Turkish military and fighters to leave the area.

== Aftermath ==
As a result of this battle, 3 Greek Cypriots have remained missing with a few being killed. On the Turkish Cypriot side, more than 92 people were reportedly killed and more than 475 being injured and hundreds having been held captive until a ceasefire was arranged and enacted by the British Forces in Cyprus. Many Turkish Cypriots were forced to flee from the town as a result of the fighting and were unable to return. As a result of this and other events that happened in December 1963, the United Nations Buffer Zone in Cyprus, also known as the "Green line" began to be established in Nicosia.

== See also ==
- Cypriot intercommunal violence
- Cyprus problem
- EOKA
- Nikos Sampson
- Turkish Resistance Organisation
- Turkish Armed Forces
