= Black gang =

Black gang may refer to:

- Black gang (ship), the members of a ship's crew who work in the fire room/engine room
- Black Gang (organisation), a Turkish Cypriot paramilitary organisation of the 1950s
- The Black Gang, an American punk rock band
- The Black Gang (novel), a 1922 novel by H. C. McNeile
- Blackgang, a village on the Isle of Wight, England, and Blackgang Chine, a theme park in Blackgang.
- Peckham Boys, a British gang also known as the Black Gang
