= Polemidia =

Polemidia may refer to:

- Kato Polemidia, a northwestern suburb of Limassol, Cyprus
- Pano Polemidia, a village north of Kato Polemidia
