= Cypriot intercommunal violence =

Violence between ethnic communities in Cyprus

Cyprus Civil/Intercommunal Violence (1958-1974)
- Part of Cyprus problem
Date	1958–1974
Location	Cyprus, mainly in Nicosia
Result	1974 Cypriot coup d'état: Turkish invasion of Cyprus

Belligerents
(Greece) Pro-enosis militias: EOKA (until 1960); Οrganisation Akritas (1961-1964); EOKA B (from 1971); Supported by: Greece	(Turkey) Pro-taksim militias: TMT (from 1958); 9 September Front; Black Gang; Supported by: Turkey

Commanders and leaders
Georgios Grivas (until January 1974); Nikos Sampson	(Turkey) Daniş Karabelen; Rauf Denktaş

Several distinct periods of intercommunal violence involving the Greek and Turkish Cypriots marked mid-20th century Cyprus.

The intercommunal violence began in 1958, when a group of armed Turkish Cypriots massacred Greek Cypriots in Kioneli, and culminated in the Turkish invasion of Cyprus in 1974.

== Background ==
Cyprus, an island lying in the eastern Mediterranean, hosted a population of Greeks and Turks (four-fifths and one-fifth, respectively), who lived under British rule in the late nineteenth-century and the first half of the twentieth-century. Christian Orthodox Church of Cyprus played a prominent political role among the Greek Cypriot community, a privilege that it acquired during the Ottoman Empire with the employment of the millet system, which gave the archbishop an unofficial ethnarch status.

=== Enosis and taksim ===
The repeated rejections by the British of Greek Cypriot demands for enosis, union with Greece, led to armed resistance, organised by the National Organization of Cypriot Struggle, or EOKA. EOKA, led by the Greek-Cypriot commander George Grivas, systematically targeted British colonial authorities. One of the effects of EOKA's campaign was to alter the Turkish position from demanding full reincorporation into Turkey to a demand for taksim (partition). EOKA's mission and activities caused a "Cretan syndrome" (see Turkish Resistance Organisation) within the Turkish Cypriot community, as its members feared that they would be forced to leave the island in such a case as had been the case with Cretan Turks. As such, they preferred the continuation of British colonial rule and then taksim, the division of the island. Due to the Turkish Cypriots' support for the British, EOKA's leader, Georgios Grivas, declared them to be enemies. The fact that the Turks were a minority was, according to Nihat Erim, to be addressed by the transfer of thousands of Turks from mainland Turkey so that Greek Cypriots would cease to be the majority. When Erim visited Cyprus as the Turkish representative, he was advised by Field Marshal Sir John Harding, the then Governor of Cyprus, that Turkey should send educated Turks to settle in Cyprus.

Turkey actively promoted the idea that on the island of Cyprus two distinctive communities existed, and sidestepped its former claim that "the people of Cyprus were all Turkish subjects". In doing so, Turkey's aim to have self-determination of two to-be equal communities in effect led to de jure partition of the island. This could be justified to the international community against the will of the majority Greek population of the island. Dr. Fazil Küçük in 1954 had already proposed Cyprus be divided in two at the 35° parallel.

=== Causes of intercommunal violence ===
Lindley Dan, from Notre Dame University, spotted the roots of intercommunal violence to different visions among the two communities of Cyprus (enosis for Greek Cypriots, taksim for Turkish Cypriots). Also, Lindlay wrote that "the merging of church, schools/education, and politics in divisive and nationalistic ways" had played a crucial role in creation of havoc in Cyprus' history. Attalides Michael also pointed to the opposing nationalisms as the cause of the Cyprus problem.

== Crisis of 1955–1959 ==
By the mid-1950s, the "Cyprus is Turkish" party, movement, and slogan gained force in both Cyprus and Turkey. In a 1954 editorial, Turkish Cypriot leader Dr. Fazıl Küçük expressed the sentiment that the Turkish youth had grown up with the idea that "as soon as Great Britain leaves the island, it will be taken over by the Turks", and that "Turkey cannot tolerate otherwise". This perspective contributed to the willingness of Turkish Cypriots to align themselves with the British, who started recruiting Turkish Cypriots into the police force that patrolled Cyprus to fight EOKA, a Greek Cypriot nationalist organisation that sought to rid the island of British rule.

EOKA targeted colonial authorities, including police, but Georgios Grivas, the leader of EOKA, did not initially wish to open up a new front by fighting Turkish Cypriots and reassured them that EOKA would not harm their people. In 1956, some Turkish Cypriot policemen were killed by EOKA members and this provoked some intercommunal violence in the spring and summer, but these attacks on policemen were not motivated by the fact that they were Turkish Cypriots.

However, in January 1957, Grivas changed his policy as his forces in the mountains became increasingly pressured by the British Crown forces. In order to divert the attention of the Crown forces, EOKA members started to target Turkish Cypriot policemen intentionally in the towns, so that Turkish Cypriots would riot against the Greek Cypriots and the security forces would have to be diverted to the towns to restore order. The killing of a Turkish Cypriot policeman on 19 January, when a power station was bombed, and the injury of three others, provoked three days of intercommunal violence in Nicosia. The two communities targeted each other in reprisals, at least one Greek Cypriot was killed and the British Army was deployed in the streets. Greek Cypriot stores were burned and their neighbourhoods attacked. Following the events, the Greek Cypriot leadership spread the propaganda that the riots had merely been an act of Turkish Cypriot aggression. Such events created chaos and drove the communities apart both in Cyprus and in Turkey.

On 22 October 1957 Sir Hugh Mackintosh Foot replaced Sir John Harding as the British Governor of Cyprus. Foot suggested five to seven years of self-government before any final decision. His plan rejected both enosis and taksim. The Turkish Cypriot response to this plan was a series of anti-British demonstrations in Nicosia on 27 and 28 January 1958 rejecting the proposed plan because the plan did not include partition. The British then withdrew the plan.

In 1957, Black Gang, a Turkish Cypriot pro-taksim paramilitary organisation, was formed to patrol a Turkish Cypriot enclave, the Tahtakale district of Nicosia, against activities of EOKA. The organisation later attempted to grow into a national scale, but failed to gain public support.

=== Beginning of intercommunal violence ===
The first wave of intercommunal violence began in 1958. By then, signs of dissatisfaction with the British increased on both sides, with a group of Turkish Cypriots forming Volkan (later renamed to the Turkish Resistance Organisation) paramilitary group to promote partition and the annexation of Cyprus to Turkey as dictated by the Menderes plan. Volkan initially consisted of roughly 100 members, with the stated aim of raising awareness in Turkey of the Cyprus issue and courting military training and support for Turkish Cypriot fighters from the Turkish government.

In June 1958, the British Prime Minister, Harold Macmillan, was expected to propose a plan to resolve the Cyprus issue. In light of the new development, the Turks rioted in Nicosia to promote the idea that Greek and Turkish Cypriots could not live together and therefore any plan that did not include partition would not be viable. This violence was soon followed by bombing, Greek Cypriot deaths and looting of Greek Cypriot-owned shops and houses. Greek and Turkish Cypriots started to flee mixed population villages where they were a minority in search of safety. This was effectively the beginning of the segregation of the two communities.

On 7 June 1958, a bomb exploded at the entrance of the Turkish Embassy in Cyprus. Following the bombing, Turkish Cypriots looted Greek Cypriot properties. On 26 June 1984, the Turkish Cypriot leader, Rauf Denktaş, admitted on British channel ITV that the bomb was placed by the Turks themselves in order to create tension. On 9 January 1995, Rauf Denktaş repeated his claim to the famous Turkish newspaper Milliyet in Turkey.

==== First massacre of the intercommunal violence ====
The crisis reached a climax on 12 June 1958, when eight Greeks from a group of thirty-five Greek Cypriots from Kondemenos were killed near Kioneli by Turkish Cypriots. The Greek Cypriot group had travelled toward Skylloura after receiving a false report that fighting had broken out there and had taken up arms and an ambush position near the village in anticipation of a possible clash. However, British forces arrested the group and subsequently ordered them to walk back unarmed towards Kondemenos, whereupon they were attacked and murdered by armed Turkish Cypriots near Kioneli.

The above massacre, in which eight Greek Cypriots were killed and five seriously wounded, is considered to have been the first intercommunal massacre in Cyprus. It also served as a catalyst for the escalation of the violence, including later reprisals and attacks.

== Republic of Cyprus ==
After the EOKA campaign against British rule began, the Eden ministry began looking for a way to extricate Britain from the situation. To this end, the Eden ministry resolved to temper demands for enosis in Greece and Cyprus by encouraging the Turkish government of Adnan Menderes to publicly express their support for Turkish-Cypriot cause, which they estimated would ensure the issue would not reach the United Nations Security Council. The Turkish Cypriot leadership visited Menderes to discuss the Cyprus issue. When asked how the Turkish Cypriots should respond to the Greek Cypriot claim of enosis, Menderes replied: "You should go to the British foreign minister and request the status quo be prolonged, Cyprus to remain as a British colony". When the Turkish Cypriots visited the British Foreign Secretary and requested for Cyprus to remain a colony, he replied: "You should not be asking for colonialism at this day and age, you should be asking for Cyprus be returned to Turkey, its former owner".

As Turkish Cypriots began to look to Turkey for protection, Greek Cypriots soon understood that enosis was extremely unlikely. The Greek Cypriot leader, Archbishop Makarios III, now set independence for the island as his primary objective.

Britain resolved to solve the dispute by creating an independent Cyprus. In 1959, all involved parties signed the Zurich Agreements: Britain, Turkey, Greece, and the Greek and Turkish Cypriot leaders, Makarios and Dr. Fazil Kucuk, respectively. The new constitution drew heavily on the ethnic composition of the island. The President would be a Greek Cypriot, and the Vice-President a Turkish Cypriot with an equal veto. The contribution to the public service would be set at a ratio of 70:30, and the Supreme Court would consist of an equal number of judges from both communities as well as an independent judge who was not Greek, Turkish or British. The Zurich Agreements were supplemented by a number of treaties. The Treaty of Guarantee stated that secession or union with any state was forbidden, and that Greece, Turkey and Britain would be given guarantor status to intervene if that was violated. The Treaty of Alliance allowed for two small Greek and Turkish military contingents to be stationed on the island, and the Treaty of Establishment gave Britain sovereignty over two military bases in Akrotiri and Dhekelia.

On 15 August 1960, the Colony of Cyprus became fully independent as the Republic of Cyprus. The new republic remained within the Commonwealth of Nations.

The new constitution brought dissatisfaction to Greek Cypriots, who felt it to be highly unjust for them, since although they made up 77.1% of the island's population, had lived on the island for over 3,000 years, and paid 92.5% of Direct & Indirect and 94% of Income taxes, the new constitution allocated 30% of the public sector jobs and 40% of security force jobs to Turkish Cypriots, who made up 18.2% of the island's population, who had lived on the island for just under 400 years, and paid 7.5% of Direct & Indirect and 5% of Income taxes.

== Crisis of 1963–1964 ==
=== Proposed constitutional amendments and the Akritas plan ===
Within three years tensions between the two communities in administrative affairs began to show. In particular disputes over separate municipalities and taxation created a deadlock in government. A constitutional court ruled in 1963 Makarios had failed to uphold article 173 of the constitution which called for the establishment of separate municipalities for Turkish Cypriots. Makarios subsequently declared his intention to ignore the judgement, resulting in the West German judge resigning from his position. Makarios proposed thirteen amendments to the constitution, which would have had the effect of resolving most of the issues in the Greek Cypriot favour. Under the proposals, the President and Vice-President would lose their veto, the separate municipalities as sought after by the Turkish Cypriots would be abandoned, the need for separate majorities by both communities in passing legislation would be discarded and the civil service contribution would be set at actual population ratios (82:18) instead of the slightly higher figure for Turkish Cypriots.

The intention behind the amendments has long been called into question. The Akritas plan, written in the height of the constitutional dispute by the Greek Cypriot interior minister Polycarpos Georkadjis, called for the removal of undesirable elements of the constitution so as to allow power-sharing to work. The plan envisaged a swift retaliatory attack on Turkish Cypriot strongholds should Turkish Cypriots resort to violence to resist the measures, stating "In the event of a planned or staged Turkish attack, it is imperative to overcome it by force in the shortest possible time, because if we succeed in gaining command of the situation (in one or two days), no outside, intervention would be either justified or possible." Whether Makarios's proposals were part of the Akritas plan is unclear, however it remains that sentiment towards enosis had not completely disappeared with independence. Makarios described independence as "a step on the road to enosis". Preparations for conflict were not entirely absent from Turkish Cypriots either, with right wing elements still believing taksim (partition) the best safeguard against enosis.

Greek Cypriots however believe the amendments were a necessity stemming from a perceived attempt by Turkish Cypriots to frustrate the working of government. Turkish Cypriots saw it as a means to reduce their status within the state from one of co-founder to that of minority, seeing it as a first step towards enosis. The security situation deteriorated rapidly.

=== Intercommunal violence ===
An armed conflict was triggered after December 21, 1963, a period remembered by Turkish Cypriots as Bloody Christmas, when a Greek Cypriot policeman that had been called to help deal with a taxi driver refusing officers already on the scene access to check the identification documents of his customers, took out his gun upon arrival and shot and killed the taxi driver and his partner. Eric Solsten summarised the events as follows: "a Greek Cypriot police patrol, ostensibly checking identification documents, stopped a Turkish Cypriot couple on the edge of the Turkish quarter. A hostile crowd gathered, shots were fired, and two Turkish Cypriots were killed."

In the morning after the shooting, crowds gathered in protest in Northern Nicosia, likely encouraged by the TMT, without incident. On the evening of the 22nd, gunfire broke out, communication lines to the Turkish neighbourhoods were cut, and the Greek Cypriot police occupied the nearby airport. On the 23rd, a ceasefire was negotiated, but did not hold. Fighting, including automatic weapons fire, between Greek and Turkish Cypriots and militias increased in Nicosia and Larnaca. A force of Greek Cypriot irregulars led by Nikos Sampson entered the Nicosia suburb of Omorphita and engaged in heavy firing on armed, as well as by some accounts unarmed, Turkish Cypriots. The Omorphita clash has been described by Turkish Cypriots as a massacre, while this view has generally not been acknowledged by Greek Cypriots.

Further ceasefires were arranged between the two sides, but also failed. By Christmas Eve, the 24th, Britain, Greece, and Turkey had joined talks, with all sides calling for a truce. On Christmas Day, Turkish fighter jets overflew Nicosia in a show of support. Finally it was agreed to allow a force of 2,700 British soldiers to help enforce a ceasefire. In the next days, a "buffer zone" was created in Nicosia, and a British officer marked a line on a map with green ink, separating the two sides of the city, which was the beginning of the "Green Line". Fighting continued across the island for the next several weeks.

In total 364 Turkish Cypriots and 174 Greek Cypriots were killed during the violence. 25,000 Turkish Cypriots from 103 to 109 villages fled and were displaced into enclaves and thousands of Turkish Cypriot houses were ransacked or completely destroyed.

At 1 January 1964, Turks attacked a monastery massacring three unarmed Greek monks with shotguns and injuring an additional four.

During the Battle of Tillyria, between 8–9 August 1964 the Turkish Air Force was given free rein to attack multiple targets within Tillyria, including a number of Greek Cypriot villages. As a result, heavy bombing caused significant casualties among the civilian population. Turkish pilot Cengiz Topel and his forces illegally dropped napalm bombs onto Greek Cypriot civilians and civilian-populated areas, leaving many Greek civilians dead and homeless; several animals were also killed in the bombing. A British Pathé video documented the attack on civilians, noting its "tragic aftermath". 29 civilians were reported as dead in the aftermath of the attack. Cypriot civilian casualties were reported as a result of heavy air attacks (dropping incendiary napalm bombs) against several populated locations, including Kato Pyrgos.

The Secretary-General of the United Nations in 1964, U Thant, reported the damage during the conflicts between 21 December 1963 to 10 August 1964:

UNFICYP carried out a detailed survey of all damage to properties throughout the island during the disturbances; it shows that in 109 villages, most of them Turkish-Cypriot or mixed villages, 527 houses have been destroyed while 2,000 others have suffered damage from looting.

== Crisis of 1967 ==
The situation worsened in 1967, when a military junta overthrew the democratically elected government of Greece, and began applying pressure on Makarios to achieve enosis. Makarios, not wishing to become part of a military dictatorship or trigger a Turkish invasion, began to distance himself from the goal of enosis. This caused tensions with the junta in Greece as well as George Grivas in Cyprus. Grivas's control over the National Guard and Greek contingent was seen as a threat to Makarios's position, who now feared a possible coup. The National Guard and Cyprus Police began patrolling the Turkish Cypriot enclaves of Ayios Theodoros and Kophinou, and on November 15 engaged in heavy fighting with the Turkish Cypriots.

By the time of his withdrawal, 27 Turkish Cypriots had been killed, 24 of which were armed fighters of the Turkish Resistance Organization. Turkey replied with an ultimatum demanding that Georgios Grivas be removed from the island, that the troops smuggled from Greece in excess of the limits of the Treaty of Alliance be removed, and that the economic blockades on the Turkish Cypriot enclaves be lifted. Grivas was recalled by the Athens Junta and the 12,000 Greek troops were withdrawn. Makarios now attempted to consolidate his position by reducing the number of National Guard troops, and by creating a paramilitary force loyal to Cypriot independence. In 1968, acknowledging that enosis was now all but impossible, Makarios stated, "A solution by necessity must be sought within the limits of what is feasible which does not always coincide with the limits of what is desirable."

== Greek Cypriot coup ==
After 1967 tensions between the Greek and Turkish Cypriots subsided. Instead, the main source of tension on the island came from factions within the Greek Cypriot community. Although Makarios had effectively abandoned enosis in favour of an 'attainable solution', many others continued to believe that the only legitimate political aspiration for Greek Cypriots was union with Greece.

On his arrival, Grivas began by establishing a nationalist paramilitary group known as the National Organization of Cypriot Fighters (Ethniki Organosis Kyprion Agoniston B or EOKA-B), drawing comparisons with the EOKA struggle for enosis under the British colonial administration of the 1950s.

The military junta in Athens saw Makarios as an obstacle. Makarios's failure to disband the National Guard, whose officer class was dominated by mainland Greeks, had meant the junta had practical control over the Cypriot military establishment, leaving Makarios isolated and a vulnerable target.

== Turkish Intervention ==
During the first Turkish operation, Turkish troops landed on Cyprus against the military coup of the Greek junta on 20 July 1974, invoking its rights to protect the republic under the Treaty of Guarantee. Turkish troops managed to capture 3% of the island which was accompanied by the burning of the Turkish Cypriot quarter. A temporary cease-fire followed which was mitigated by the UN Security Council. Subsequently, the Greek military junta collapsed on July 23, 1974, and peace talks commenced in which a democratic government was installed. Resolution 353 was broken after Turkey attacked a second time and managed to get a hold of 37% of Cyprus territory. The Island of Cyprus was appointed a Buffer Zone by the United Nations, which divided the island into two zones through the 'Green Line' and put an end to the Turkish military operation. The territory of Turkish Cypriots was called the Federated Turkish State in 1975, was legitimised, and able to internationally trade. The United Nations called for the international recognition of independence for the Republic of Cyprus in Security Council Resolution 367.

== See also ==
- Modern history of Cyprus
- Turkish Resistance Organisation
- Civilian casualties and displacements during the Cyprus conflict
- List of massacres in Cyprus

== Sources ==
- James, Alan (28 November 2001). Keeping the Peace in the Cyprus Crisis of 1963–64. Palgrave Macmillan UK. ISBN 978-1-4039-0089-0.
- Lindley, Dan (2007). "Historical, Tactical, and Strategic Lessons from the Partition of Cyprus". International Studies Perspectives. 8 (2). Oxford University Press (OUP): 224–241. doi:10.1111/j.1528-3585.2007.00282.x. ISSN 1528-3577.
- Yildizian, Arax-Marie; Ehteshami, A. (2004). "Ethnic Conflict in Cyprus and the Contact Hypothesis: An Empirical Investigation".
