= Cumhuriyet Park =

Park in North Nicosia, Northern Cyprus

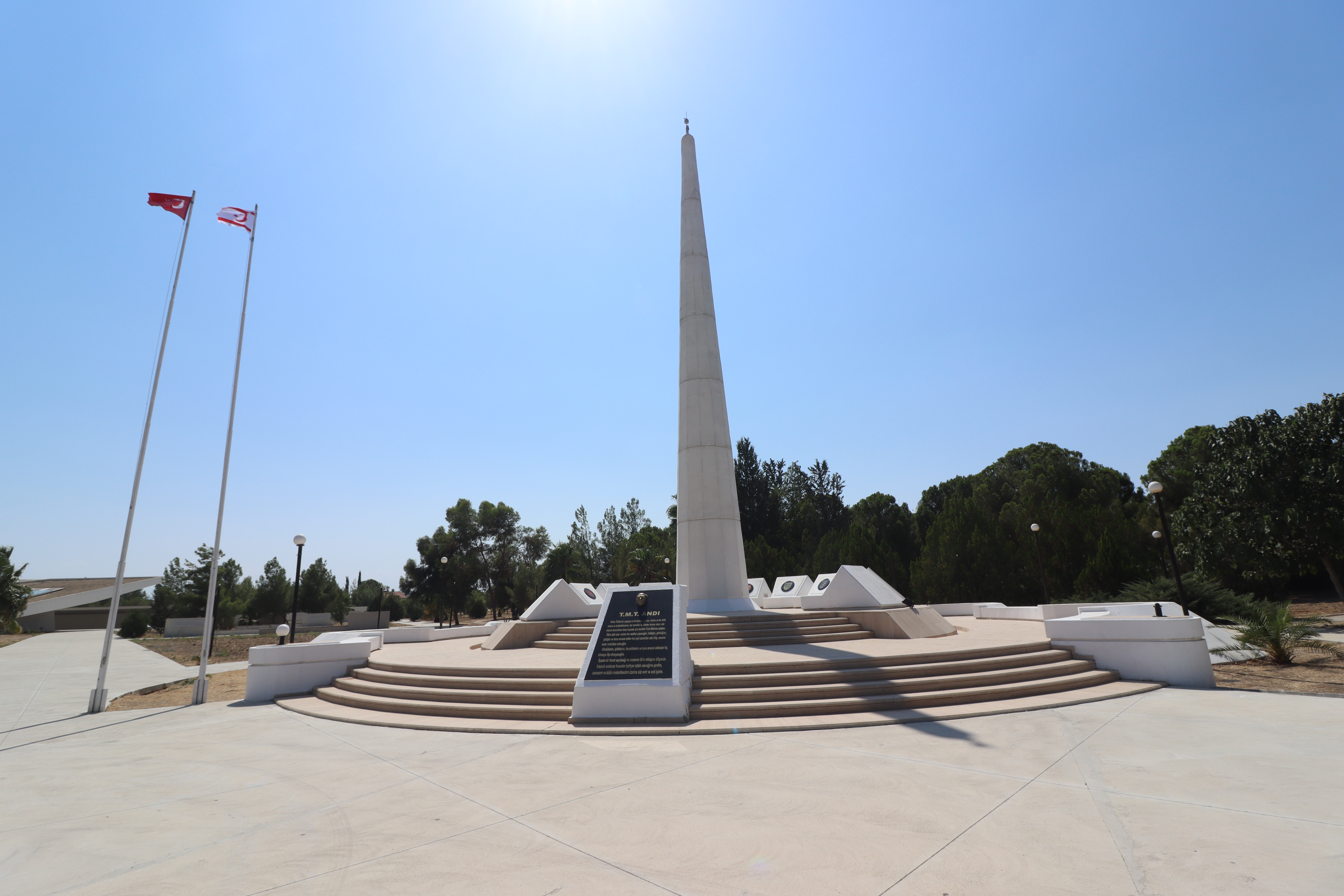
Turkish Resistance Organization Monument in Cumhuriyet Park, 2022

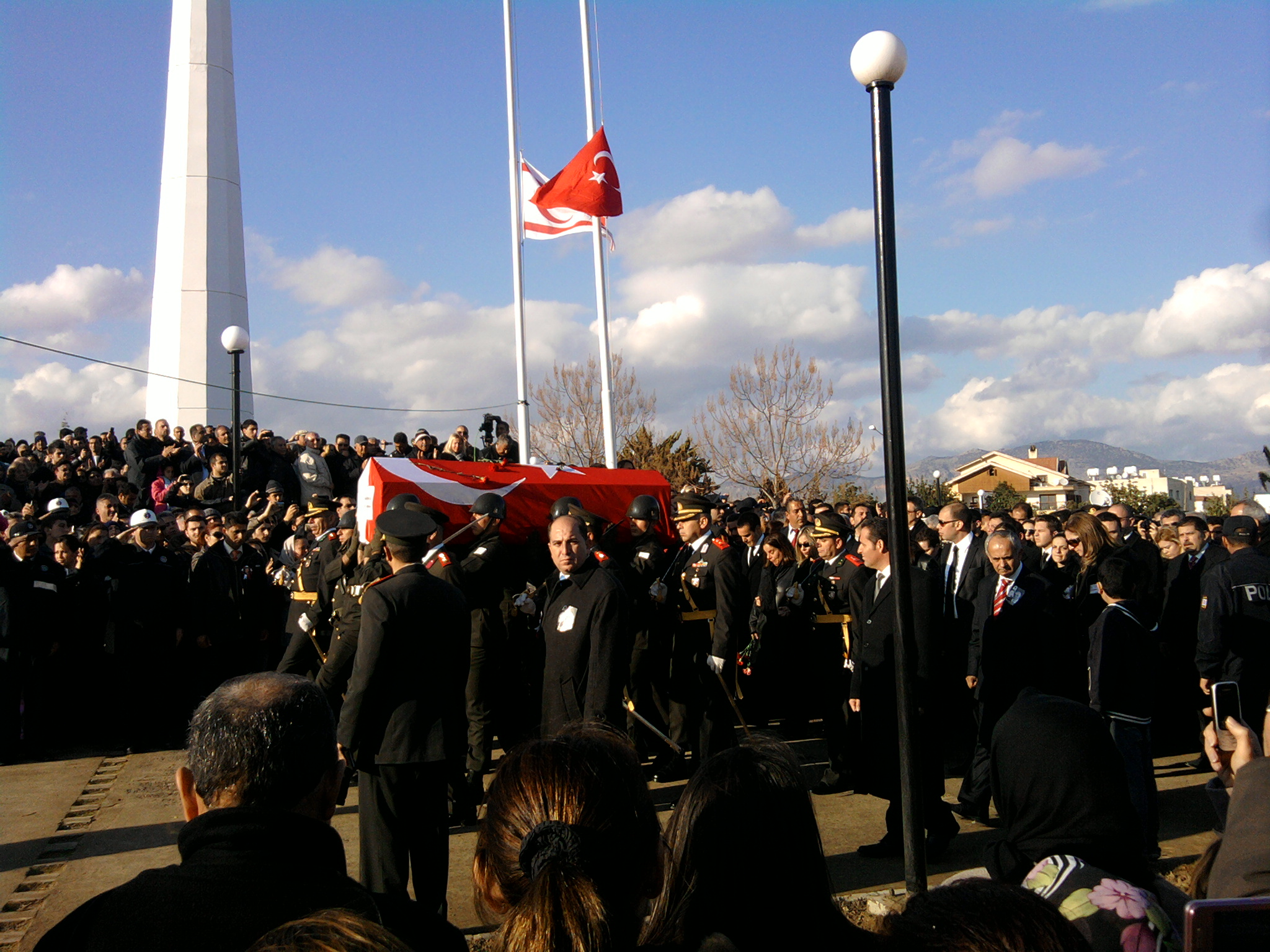
The funeral of Denktaş in Cumhuriyet Park, in front of the TMT monument

Cumhuriyet Park (Turkish: Cumhuriyet Parkı, lit. 'Park of the Republic') is a park in the Gönyeli quarter of North Nicosia. It is the resting place of Rauf Denktaş, the founder of Northern Cyprus, and is an important tourist attraction.

The park covers an area of 100 dunams (approximately 134,000 m^{2} (33 acres)) and is the biggest park and urban green space in Northern Cyprus. In 2007, it was reported by Mustafa Akıncı to be in a poor condition, upon which 400 trees were planted in the park and water supply was restructured. In 2009, eucalyptus trees were planted and 250 more trees were planted in 2011.

The park is home to a monument dedicated to the Turkish Resistance Organization (TMT). On 17 January 2012, Rauf Denktaş was buried in the park. His grave lies 150 meters (490 ft) south of the TMT monument. The decision was taken by the cabinet as the park was perceived as a symbol of Northern Cyprus and the struggle of the Turkish Cypriot people. It was announced that a mausoleum would be constructed for Denktaş.

The competition for the design of a mausoleum and a museum was announced on 1 September 2012, with a grand prize of 150,000 Turkish liras. The competition had 104 participants, 20% of whom were Turkish Cypriots, and the winners were from Istanbul Bilgi University, Yıldız Technical University and Bahçeşehir University. However, by 2014, no plans to begin the construction were on the agenda due to budgetary problems and the grave of Denktaş was reportedly in a poor condition.

The park lies opposite the Dr. Burhan Nalbantoğlu State Hospital.
