= United Nations Security Council Resolution 360 =

UN Security Council Resolution 360
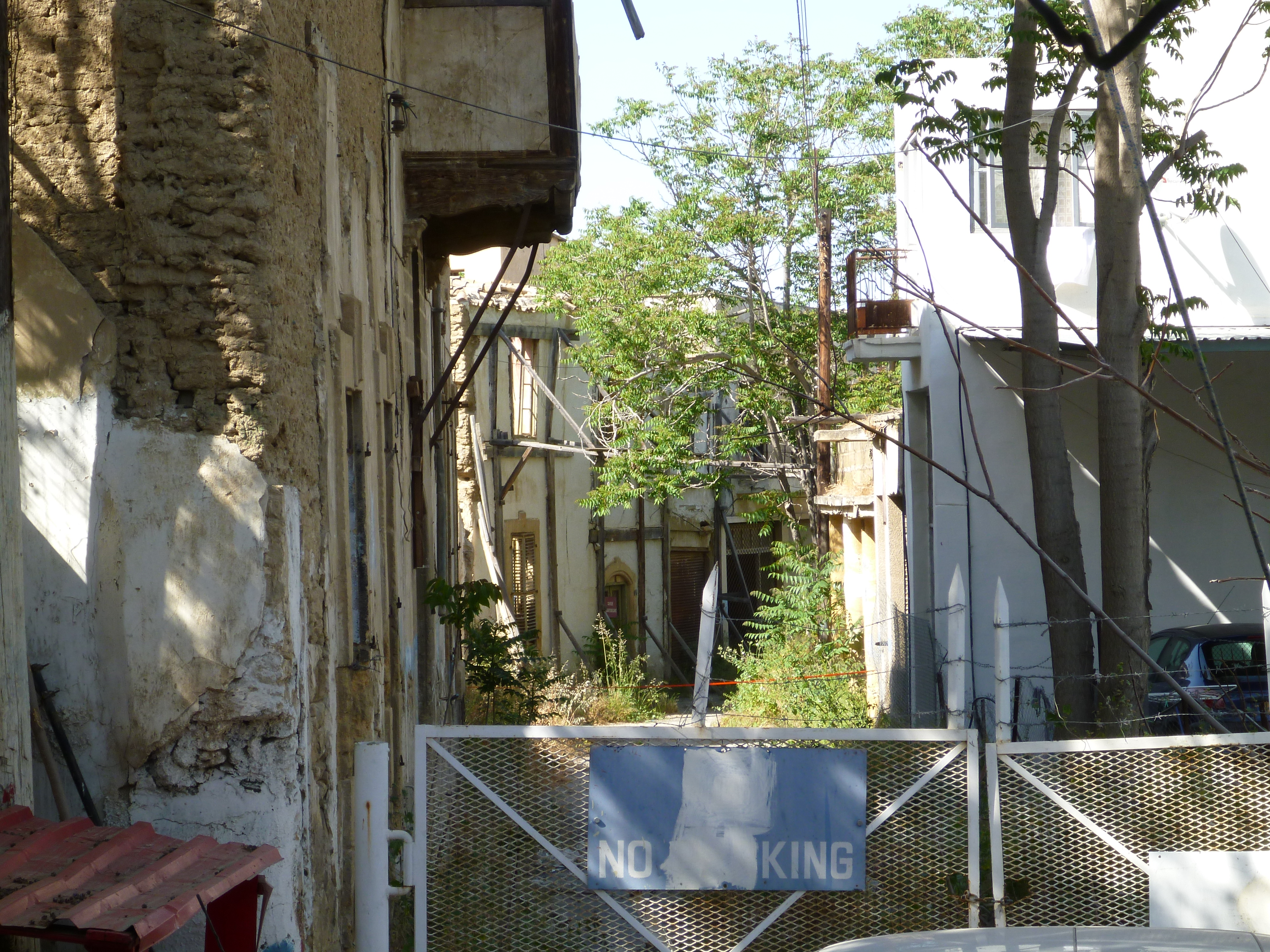
- Buffer zone in Nicosia
- Date: 16 August 1974
- Meeting no.: 1,794
- Code: S/RES/360 (Document)
- Subject: Cyprus
- Voting summary: 11 voted for; None voted against; 3 abstained
- Result: Adopted

Security Council composition
- Permanent members: China; France; Soviet Union; United Kingdom; United States
- Non-permanent members: Australia; Austria; Byelorussian SSR; Cameroon; Costa Rica; Indonesia; Iraq; Kenya; Mauritania; Peru

United Nations Security Council Resolution 360, adopted on 16 August 1974, after recalling previous resolutions and noting that all states have declared their respect for the sovereignty, independence and territorial integrity of the Republic of Cyprus, the Resolution formally records its disapproval of the unilateral military actions taken against it by Turkey. The Council then urged the parties to comply without delay to their previous resolutions, particularly 353, and then requested the Secretary-General to report back to them as necessary with a view to possibly adopting further measures designed to promote the restoration of peaceful conditions.

The resolution was adopted with 11 votes to none against, with three abstentions from Byelorussian Soviet Socialist Republic, Iraq and Soviet Union.

== See also ==
- Cyprus dispute
- List of United Nations Security Council Resolutions 301 to 400 (1971–1976)
- Turkish invasion of Cyprus
