= United Nations Security Council Resolution 354 =

UN Security Council Resolution 354
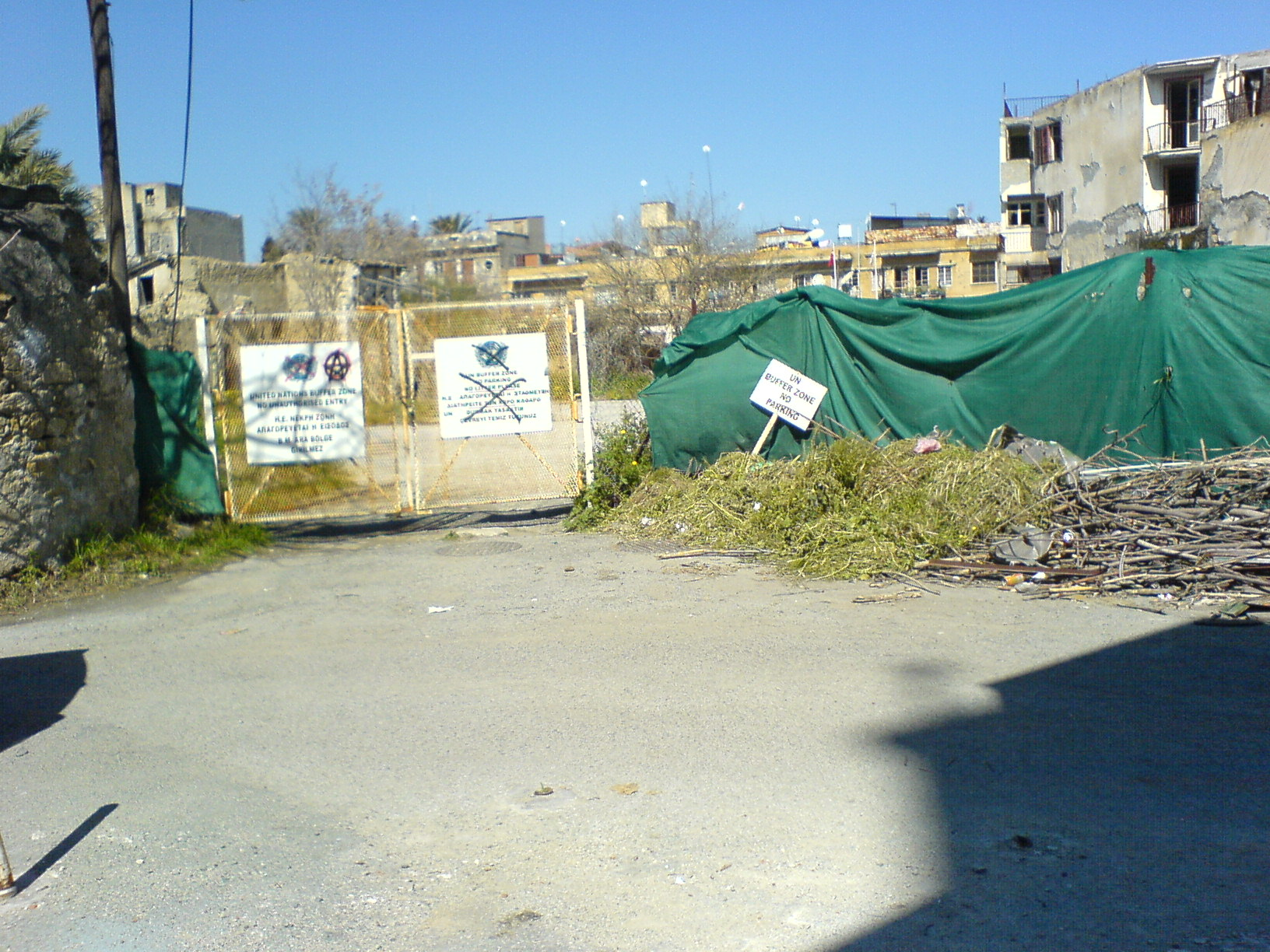
- Border fence in the buffer zone
- Date: 23 July 1974
- Meeting no.: 1,783
- Code: S/RES/354 (Document)
- Subject: Cyprus
- Voting summary: 15 voted for; None voted against; None abstained
- Result: Adopted

Security Council composition
- Permanent members: China; France; Soviet Union; United Kingdom; United States
- Non-permanent members: Australia; Austria; Byelorussian SSR; Cameroon; Costa Rica; Indonesia; Iraq; Kenya; Mauritania; Peru

United Nations Security Council Resolution 354, adopted unanimously on 23 July 1974, was a brief resolution, it reaffirmed the provisions of resolution 353 and demanded that all parties to the fighting in Cyprus to comply immediately with Resolution 353 and to cease fire. Resolution 354 also requested all states to refrain from any action that might further aggravate the situation.

== See also ==
- Cyprus problem
- History of Cyprus
- List of United Nations Security Council Resolutions 301 to 400 (1971–1976)
