= Kato Polemidia =

Kato Polemidia Κάτω Πολεμίδια (Greek) Aşağı Binatlı (Turkish)
- Municipal District
- Interactive map of Kato Polemidia
- Location within Cyprus Location within the Eastern Mediterranean Location within the European Union Location within Asia
- Coordinates: 34°41′35″N 32°59′57″E
- Country: Cyprus
- District: Limassol District
- Urban area: Limassol
- Municipality: Polemidia Municipality

Area
  - Municipality: 20.35 km^{2} (7.86 sq mi)

Population (2011)
  - Municipality: 22,369
  - Density: 1,099/km^{2} (2,847/sq mi)
- Time zone: UTC+2 (EET)
  - Summer (DST): UTC+3 (EEST)
- Website: http://www.polemidiamunicipal.com.cy/

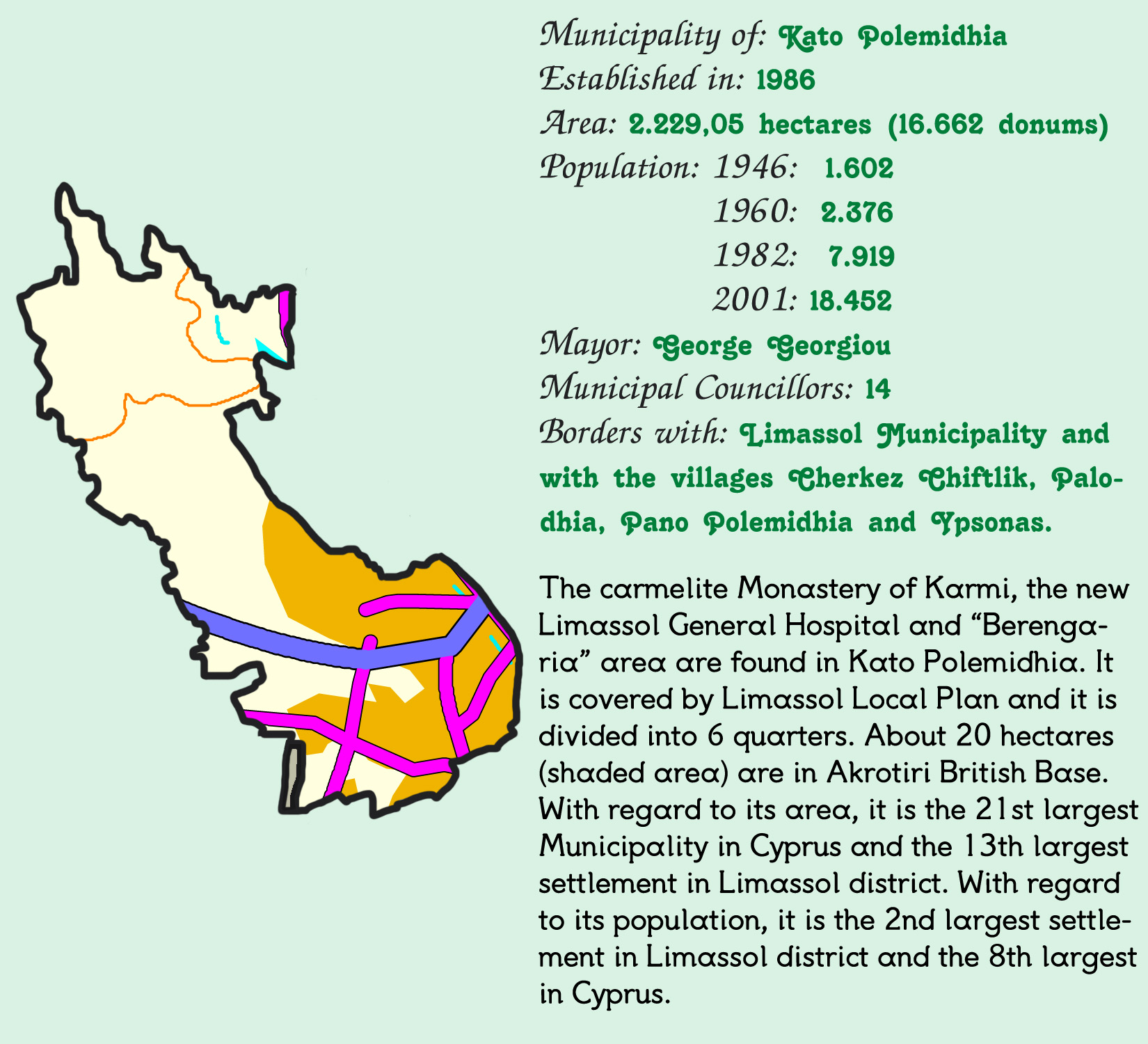
Concise presentation of Kato Polemidhia

Kato Polemidia (Greek: Κάτω Πολεμίδια; Turkish: Aşağı Binatlı) is a municipal district of Polemidia Municipality located in the Limassol District of Cyprus. It has a population of 22,369 according to the 2011 census.

== History ==
The area of Kato Polemidia has been inhabited since prehistoric times. Archaeological excavations have uncovered a Late Bronze Age necropolis, as well as archaeological remains from prehistoric times at sites called Skammata and Ufkia. In medieval sources the village is referred to as Polemidia, without dividing into Lower and Upper Polemidia.

In 1986 Kato Polemidia was declared a municipality.

== Sub-divisions ==
The Municipal District of Kato Polemidia, for administrative purposes, is divided into 6 districts:

1. Archangel Michael
2. Anthoupolis
3. Apostle Barnabas
4. Makarios C.
5. Saint Nicholas
6. Panagia Evangelistria

== Public-health institutions ==
In Kato Polemidia is situated the New State Hospital of Limassol

== Sport clubs ==
Sports clubs in the area are Doxa Polemidion, Anorthosi polemidion and Hermes Polemidion.

== Demographics ==
In 1960 Census, there were 1286 Greek Cypriots and 982 Turkish Cypriots in Kato Polemidia.

During the years of Cypriot intercommunal violence and after the collapse of the bicommunal structure of the Republic of Cyprus, Richard Patrick wrote that the village, along with Pano Polemidia, were exceptional in that they remained accessible to the Greek Cypriot population and the Greek Cypriot National Guard. The National Guard co-existed with the fighters of the Turkish Resistance Organization, which were open with regards to their existence, but were tolerated by the National Guard so long as they did not carry weaponry. In 1974, following the ultra-nationalist Greek coup and the Turkish invasion of Cyprus, the population of the village fled to the Akrotiri British Base. Some of the population then fled secretly to Northern Cyprus, but most were transferred in 1975 and resettled in Morphou. The village was repopulated by displaced Greek Cypriots from the north, who initially filled up the homes of Turkish Cypriots. As more refugees came in, they were allocated self-housing schemes in the village.

== Sports ==
The Turkish Cypriot football club Binatlı Yılmaz S.K., now based in Morphou, was founded in 1940. As of 2015, the club is playing in Cyprus Turkish Football Association (CTFA) K-PET 1st League.
