= Pano Polemidia =

Pano Polemidia: Πάνω Πολεμίδια (Greek); Yukarı Binatlı (Turkish)
- Village and Municipal District
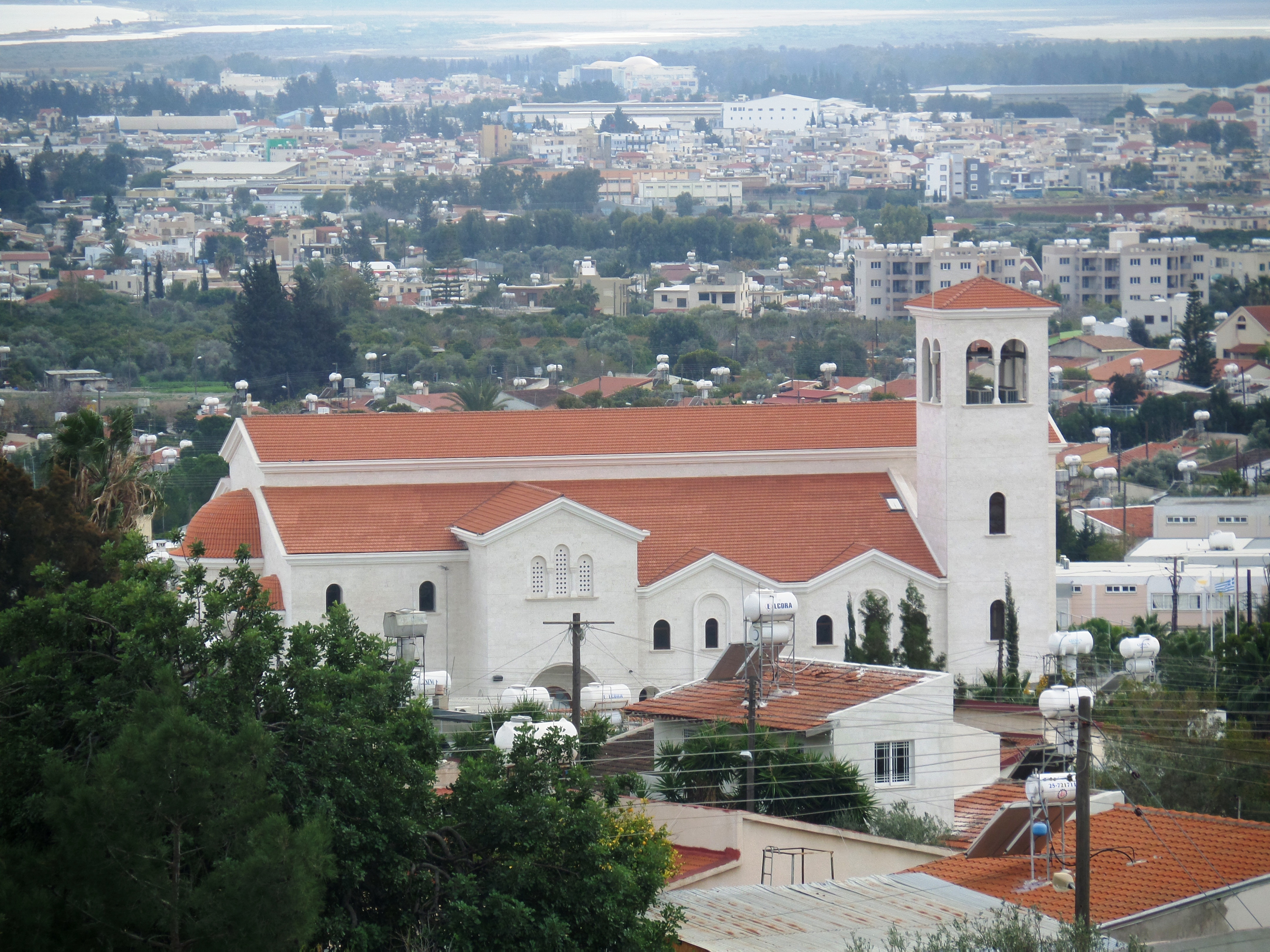

- Location in Cyprus
- Coordinates: 34°42′19″N 32°59′32″E
- Country: Cyprus
- District: Limassol District

Government

Population (2011)
  - Total: 3,443
- Time zone: UTC+2 (Eastern European Time)
  - Summer (DST): UTC+3 (Eastern European Time)
- Postal code: 4130
- Website: www.panopolemidia.org

Pano Polemidia (Greek: Πάνω Πολεμίδια; Turkish: Yukarı Binatlı) is a large village in the Limassol District of Cyprus. It has a population of 3443 according to the 2011 census. It is near Kato Polemidia.

Before 1950s, Pano Polemidia had a pure Turkish Cypriot population: in 1901, there were 121, and in 1946, there were 154 Turkish Cypriots in the village.

During the years of Cypriot intercommunal violence and after the collapse of the bicommunal structure of the Republic of Cyprus, Richard Patrick wrote that the village, along with Kato Polemidia, were exceptional in that they remained accessible to the Greek Cypriot population and the Greek Cypriot National Guard. The National Guard co-existed with the fighters of the Turkish Resistance Organization, which were open with regard to their existence, but were tolerated by the National Guard so long as they did not carry weaponry. In 1974, following the ultra-nationalist Greek coup and the Turkish invasion of Cyprus, the population of the village fled to the Akrotiri British Base. Some of the population then fled secretly to Northern Cyprus, but most were transferred in 1975 and resettled in Morphou. The village was repopulated by displaced Greek Cypriots from the north, who initially filled up the homes of Turkish Cypriots. As more refugees came in, they were allocated self-housing schemes in the village.

== Sports ==
The Turkish Cypriot football club Binatlı Yılmaz S.K., now based in Morphou, was founded in 1940, playing in the Turkish Cypriot Second Division. The professional club APK Karmiotissa Pano Polemidion represents the settlement in the main Cypriot Second Division.

== Sources ==
- History
