= Panayias Evaggelistrias (Kato Polemidia) =

District of the Municipality of Kato Polemidia

Coordinates: 34°41′38″N 33°00′13″E

Panagias Evangelistrias is a district of the municipality of Kato Polemidia in Cyprus.

== Location ==
To the south it borders with Apostolos Barnabas, to the southeast with Makarios III, to the east with Agia Fyla, to the north with Pano Polemidia and Palodia, and to the west with Ypsonas and Agios Nikolaos.

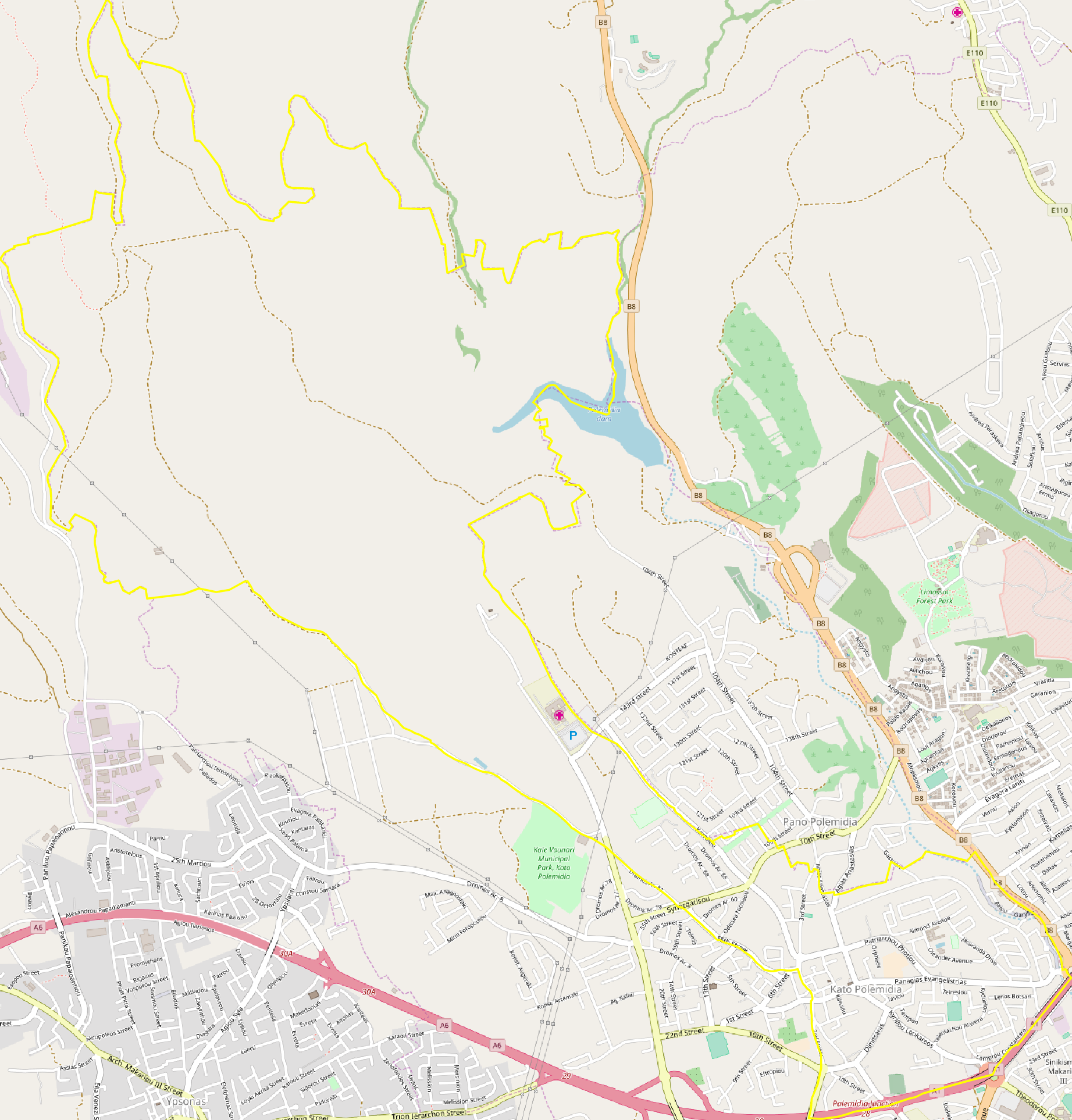
Location of Panagia Evaggelistria district of Kato Polemidia Municipality

== Government buildings ==
The Limassol General Hospital, the public hospital of Limassol that is divided in 2 different places in Limassol, is located in Panayia Evangelistria district of Kato Polemidia.

== Religious sites ==
The sanctuary of the district is dedicated to the Virgin Mary. Construction began in 1908 and was completed in 1959. The inauguration took place in 1963. In Panagia Evangelistria area the Limassol General Hospital is located, the public hospital of Limassol.
