= Anthoupolis (Kato Polemidia) =

Quarter of Kato Polemidia Municipality

Coordinates: 35°06′N 33°17′E

Anthoupolis is a district of the Municipality of Kato Polemidia, Cyprus.

== Location ==
To the east Anthroupolis district borders with the Apostle Varnavas, to the north with Agios Nikolaos, to the west with Ypsonas and to the south with the Archangel Michael.

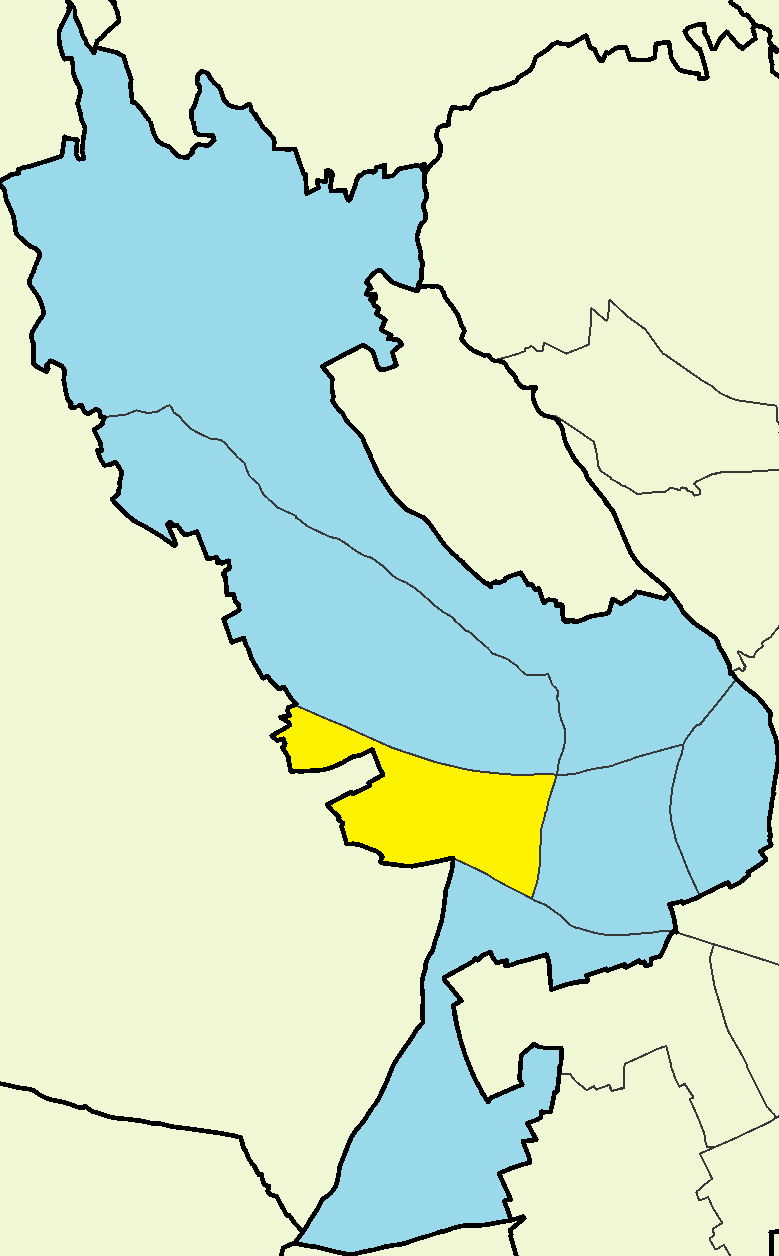
The location of Anthoupolis in the Municipality of Kato Polemidia.

== Area Map ==
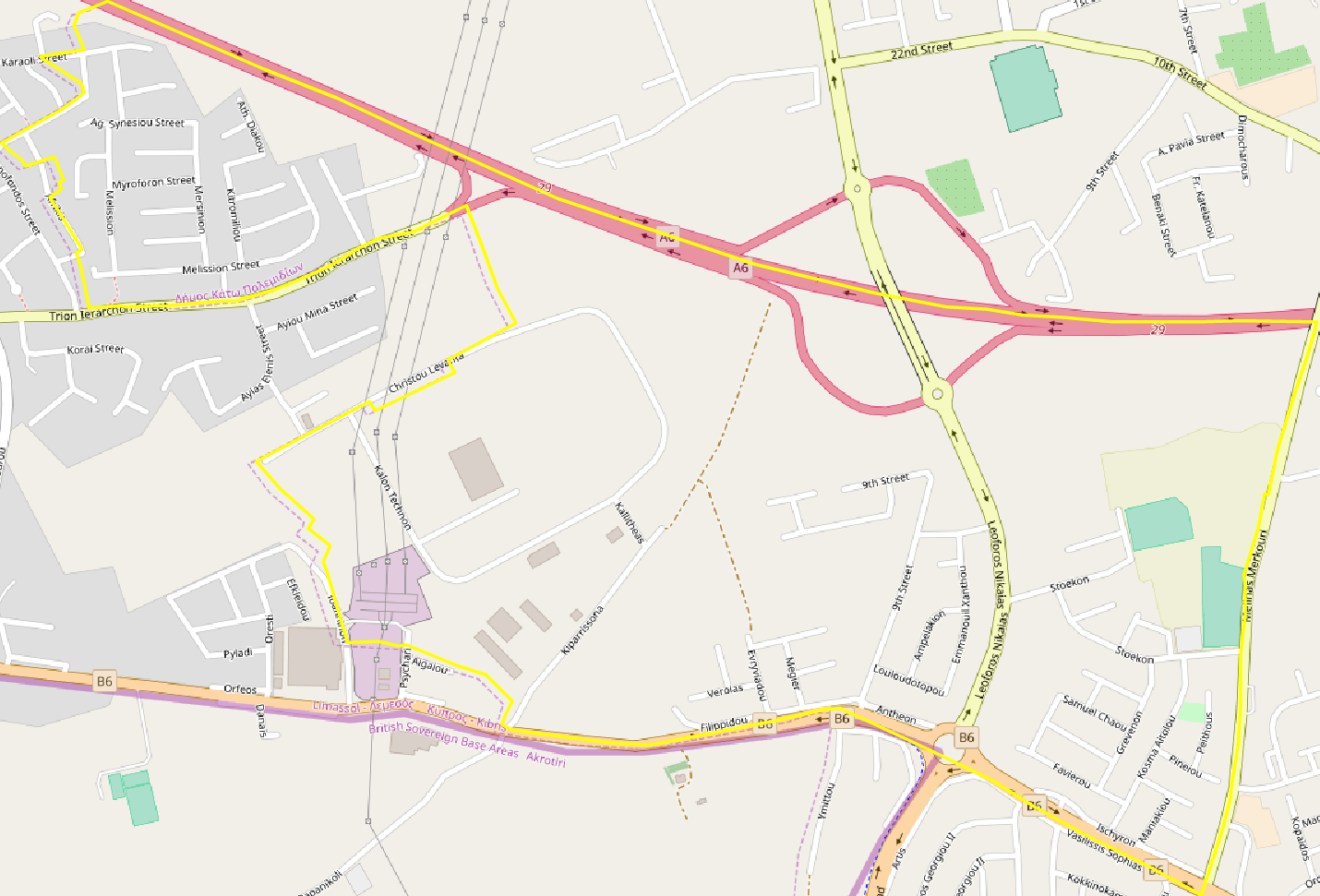
Anthoupolis Local Map
