= 9 September Front =

Turkish Cypriot paramilitary organisation

9 Eylül Cephesi
- Dates active: 1957-1958
- Headquarters: Cyprus
- Ideology: Taksim; Turkish nationalism Anti-communism
- Political position: Far-right
- Wars: Cypriot intercommunal violence

The 9 September Front (Turkish: 9 Eylül Cephesi) was a secret Turkish Cypriot pro-taksim paramilitary organisation formed to counter the Greek Cypriot Fighter's Organization EOKA and Enosis.

== History ==
The organisation was formed to counter the activities of EOKA in 1955 by mostly untrained volunteers. Organisation failed to grow up to a national scale and be effective in all of Cyprus. In 1958, leaders of the organisation decided that they are not enough to achieve their goals separately from other Turkish Cypriot organisations, and abolished itself to merge with Turkish Resistance Organisation.
