= Kontemenos =

Kontemenos: Κοντεμένος (Greek); Kılıçaslan (Turkish)
- Village
- Location in Cyprus
- Coordinates: 35°16′11″N 33°7′18″E
- Country (de jure): Cyprus
  - District: Kyrenia District
- Country (de facto): Northern Cyprus
  - District: Girne District

Population (2011)
  - Total: 194
- Time zone: UTC+2 (EET)
  - Summer (DST): UTC+3 (EEST)

Kontemenos (Greek: Κοντεμένος, Turkish: Kılıçaslan) is a town located in the Kyrenia District of Cyprus, 7 km northwest of Skylloura. It is under the de facto control of Northern Cyprus.

Since the Turkish invasion in 1974, the village has been used as a Turkish military camp. The etymology of the village's name is unclear. Until 1974, Turkish Cypriots called the village "Kördemen" or "Kördümen" ("blind wheel"); this name was changed after 1974 and the village was named after Seçim Kılıçaslan, a Turkish soldier who died near the village during the invasion.
