= Akritas plan =

Secret Greek Cypriot plan of 1963

The Akritas plan (Greek: Σχέδιο Ακρίτας), was an inside document of the Greek Cypriot secret organisation of EOK (mostly known as Akritas organisation) that was authored in 1963 and was revealed to the public later in 1966. It entailed the weakening of the Turkish Cypriots in the government of Cyprus and then uniting (enosis) Cyprus with Greece. According to Turkish Cypriots, the plan was a "blueprint to genocide", but Greek Cypriots claimed that it was rather a “defensive plan”.

== Background ==
Cyprus, an island lying in the eastern Mediterranean sea was ruled by several conquerors during its history. In the late 19th century, the Ottoman Empire handed Cyprus to the British Empire. Greek and Turkish nationalism among the two major communities of the island (four-fifths of the population being Greek, one-fifth Turkish) were growing, seeking opposite goals. Greeks were demanding enosis (Cyprus to be united with Greece) while Turks were aiming for taksim (partition). In 1955, EOKA, a paramilitary guerilla group, declared its struggle against the British.

In 1960, the British gave in and turned power over to the Greek and Turkish Cypriots. A powersharing constitution was created for the new Republic of Cyprus and included both Turkish and Greek Cypriots holding power. Three treaties were written up to guarantee the integrity and security of the new republic: the Treaty of Establishment, the Treaty of Guarantee and the Treaty of Alliance. According to the constitution, Cyprus was to become an independent republic with a Greek Cypriot president and a Turkish Cypriot vice-president, with full powersharing between Turkish and Greek Cypriots.

== Akritas organisation and plan ==
Akritas organisation (or EOK) was a secret group led by prominent members of the Greek Cypriot community, some of them being cabinet ministers. It was formed in 1961 or 1962, in the eve of the creation of Cyprus Republic, and aimed to achieve enosis. It was formed on the command of President Archbishop Makarios, with Glafkos Klerides, Tassos Papadopoulos and Polycarpos Georgadjis having key roles. Guerillas were recruited by former members of EOKA. Apart from communists, who were excluded as in the EOKA's struggle, the organisation had hostile feelings for Greek Cypriots who failed to accept Makarios as their leader, which included ultranationalists who rejected the London-Zürich Agreements. EOK had striking similarities with EOKA, from the structure and the division to tomeis, and its name was also coined to resemble that of EOKA. A joint military exercise was performed in presidential resident in Troodos mountain, along with Greek ELDYK in 1962, other military exercises of smaller-scale also took place in 1962 and 1963.

The plan was an inner document that was publicly revealed in 1966 by pro-Grivas Greek Cypriot newspaper Patris as a response to criticism by pro-Makarios media. It provided a pathway on how to change the constitution of the Cyprus Republic unilaterally, without Turkish Cypriot consent, and to declare enosis with Greece. Because it was expected that Turkish Cypriot would object and revolt, a paramilitary group of several thousand men was formed and began its training. According to the copy of the plan, it consisted of two main sections, one delineating external tactics and the other delineating internal tactics. The external tactics pointed to the Treaty of Guarantee as the first objective of an attack, with the statement that it was no longer recognised by Greek Cypriots. If the Treaty of Guarantee was abolished, there would be no legal roadblocks to enosis, which would happen through a plebiscite.

It is unknown who authored the plan or to what extent Makarios was committed to it. Frank Hoffmeister cited the historian Tzermias to support the notion that Makarios had nothing to do with the plan, but Hoffmeister mentioned John Reddaway and Etrekun, claiming that Makarios had approved the plan. The plan is signed by "Chief Akritas" (Αρχηγός Ακρίτας). According to Hoffmeister, the plan was drawn by the minister of the interior, Polycarpos Georgadjis. Angelos Chrysostomou, in his PhD thesis, wrote that Glafkos Klerides and Christodoulos Christodoulou, a top member of Akritas organisation, pointed to Tassos Papadopoulos as the author of the document. There is also controversy about when the document was formulated, but the most probable was late 1963.

== 1963 events in Cyprus ==
In November 1963, Greek Cypriot leader Makarios proposed thirteen amendments to change the constitution. The proposals resemble the first part of the Akritas plan.

Bloody Christmas violence led to the deaths of 364 Turkish Cypriots and 174 Greek Cypriots. Akritas organization's forces took part in the fighting. About a quarter of the Turkish Cypriots, some 25,000 or so, fled their homes and lands and moved into enclaves.

== Controversy and opinions ==
Greek Cypriot sources have accepted the authenticity of the Akritas plan, but controversy regarding its significance and implications persists. It is a subject of debate whether the plan was actually implemented by Makarios. Frank Hoffmeister wrote that the similarity of the military and political actions foreseen in the plan and undertaken in reality was "striking". The Turkish Cypriot perception is that the events of 1963-1964 were part of a policy of extermination. Turkish Cypriot nationalist narratives have presented the plan as a "blueprint for genocide", and it is widely perceived as a plan for extermination among Turkish Cypriots. The Turkish Ministry of Foreign Affairs calls the plan a "conspiracy to dissolve the Republic of Cyprus, in pre-determined stages and methods, and to bring about the union of Cyprus with Greece".

According to the scholar Niyazi Kızılyürek, however, the meaning later given to the plan was disproportionate, and the plan was a "stupid" and impractical plan that got more attention than it deserved because of propaganda. He claimed that in accordance to the plan, ELDYK troops should have taken action, which was not the case and led to Georgadjis shouting "traitors!" in front of their camp. Calling the plan "infamous", the scholar Evanthis Hatzivassiliou wrote that the aim of quick victory indicated the "confusion and wishful thinking of the Greek Cypriot side at that crucial moment".

== See also ==
- Cyprus
- History of Cyprus
- Modern history of Cyprus
- Timeline of Cypriot history
- Cyprus dispute
- Turkish Cypriot enclaves
- Kokkina exclave
- Cypriot refugees
- Cypriot intercommunal violence

== Sources ==
- Bryant, Rebecca; Papadakis, Yiannis (2012). Cyprus and the Politics of Memory: History, Community and Conflict. I.B.Tauris. ISBN 9781780761077.
- Chrysostomou, Aggelos M. (2013). Από τον Κυπριακό Στρατό μέχρι και τη δημιουργία της Εθνικής Φρουράς (1959-1964) : η διοικητική δομή, στελέχωση, συγκρότηση και οργάνωση του Κυπριακού Στρατού και η δημιουργία ένοπλων ομάδων-οργανώσεων στις δύο κοινότητες (PhD).
- Isachenko, Daria (2012). The Making of Informal States: Statebuilding in Northern Cyprus and Transdniestria. Palgrave Macmillan. ISBN 9780230392069.
- James, Alan (28 November 2001). Keeping the Peace in the Cyprus Crisis of 1963–64. Palgrave Macmillan UK. ISBN 978-1-4039-0089-0.
- Hakki, Murat Metin (2007). The Cyprus Issue: A Documentary History, 1878-2006. I.B.Tauris. ISBN 9781845113926.
- Hatzivassiliou, Evanthis (2006). Greece and the Cold War: Front Line State, 1952-1967. Routledge. p. 160. ISBN 9781134154883.
- Hoffmeister, Frank (2006). Legal Aspects of the Cyprus Problem: Annan Plan And EU Accession. Martinus Nijhoff Publishers. ISBN 9789004152236.
- Kliot, Nurit (2007). "Resettlement of Refugees in Finland and Cyprus: A Comparative Analysis and Possible Lessons for Israel". In Kacowicz, Arie Marcelo; Lutomski, Pawel (eds.). Population resettlement in international conflicts: a comparative study. Lexington Books. ISBN 978-0-7391-1607-4.
- Oberling, Pierre (1982). The road to Bellapais: The Turkish Cypriot exodus to northern Cyprus. p. 120. ISBN 978-0880330008.
- O'Malley, Brendan; Craig, Ian (25 August 2001). The Cyprus Conspiracy: America, Espionage and the Turkish Invasion. I.B.Tauris. ISBN 978-1-86064-737-6.
- Richter, Heinz (2011). Ιστορία της Κύπρου, τόμος δεύτερος(1950-1959). Αθήνα: Εστία.
- Sant-Cassia, Paul (2005). Bodies of Evidence: Burial, Memory and the Recovery of Missing Persons in Cyprus. Berghahn Books. ISBN 9781571816467.
- Tocci, Nathalie (2004). EU accession dynamics and conflict resolution: catalysing peace or consolidating partition in Cyprus?. Ashgate Publishing. ISBN 0-7546-4310-7.
- Tocci, Nathalie (2007). The EU and conflict resolution: promoting peace in the backyard. Routledge. ISBN 978-0-415-41394-7.
- Turkish Ministry of Foreign Affairs (2015). "THE "AKRITAS PLAN" AND THE "IKONES" DISCLOSURES OF 1980". Archived from the original on 13 April 2015.
- Uludağ, Sevgül (2004). "Ayın Karanlık Yüzü". Hamamböcüleri Journal. Archived from the original on 23 January 2020.
