= Black Gang (organisation) =

Turkish Cypriot paramilitary group (1957–58)

Kara Çete
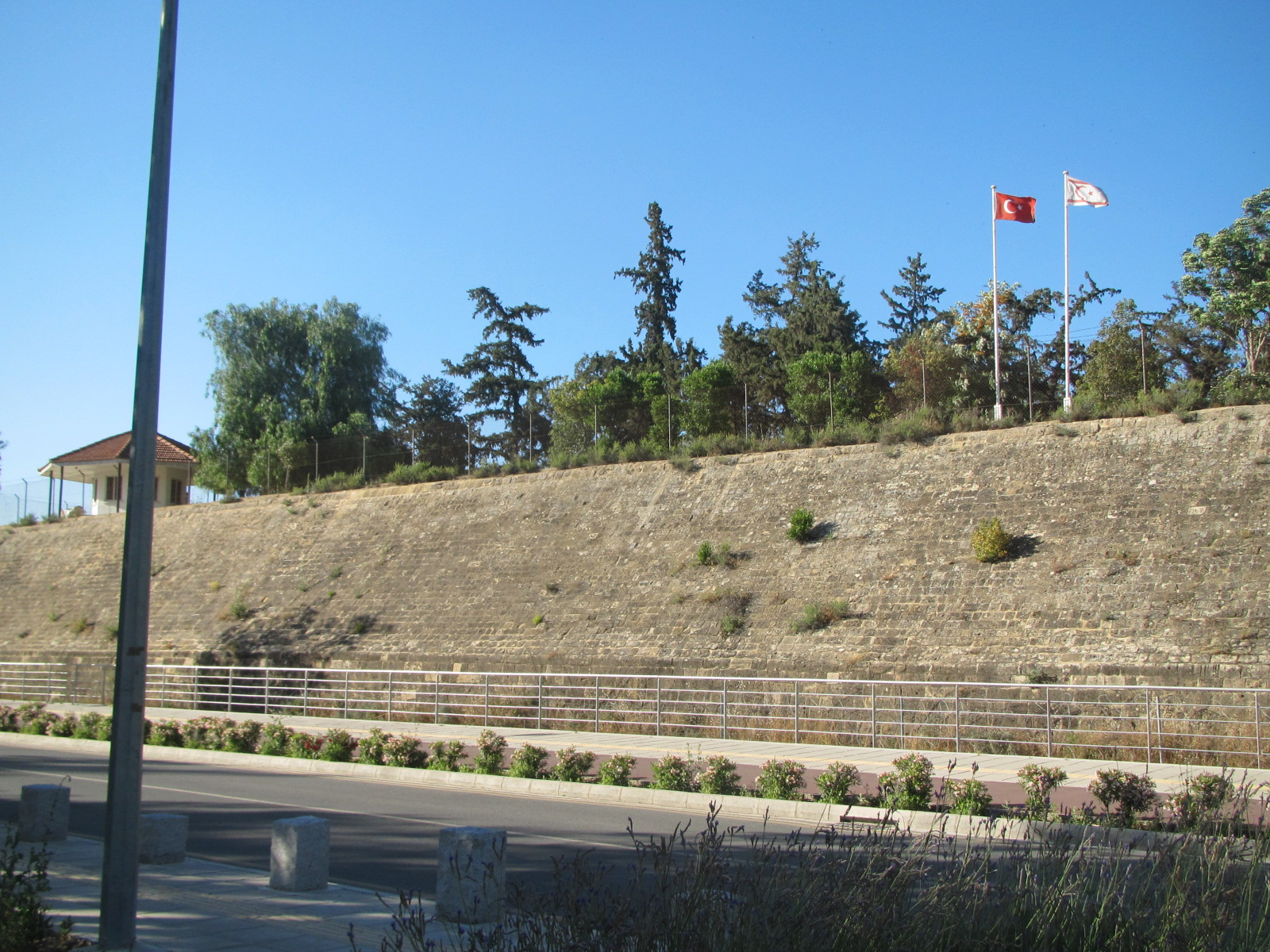
- Border wall in Nicosia
- Dates active: 1957-1958
- Headquarters: Cyprus
- Ideology: Taksim; Turkish nationalism
- Wars: Cypriot intercommunal violence

The Black Gang (Turkish: Kara Çete) was a Turkish Cypriot pro-taksim paramilitary organisation formed in 1957 with the support and funding of Fazıl Küçük and some other predominant Turkish Cypriots as an organisation to counter the Greek Cypriot Fighter's Organization (EOKA).

== History ==
The organisation was originally formed by a couple of youngsters to patrol a Turkish Cypriot enclave, the Tahtakale district of Nicosia, against activities of EOKA. It later attempted to grow into a national scale, but failed to gain public support. In April 1957, 4 members of the organisation arsoned a garage which was allegedly owned by spies of EOKA in the Tahtakale district to gain fame among the public. One member of organisation was detained by the British police related to the incident and was released after 105 days. In 1958, the organisation abolished itself and joined the Turkish Resistance Organisation.
