= Mathiatis =

Mathiatis: Μαθιάτης (Greek); Matyat (Turkish)
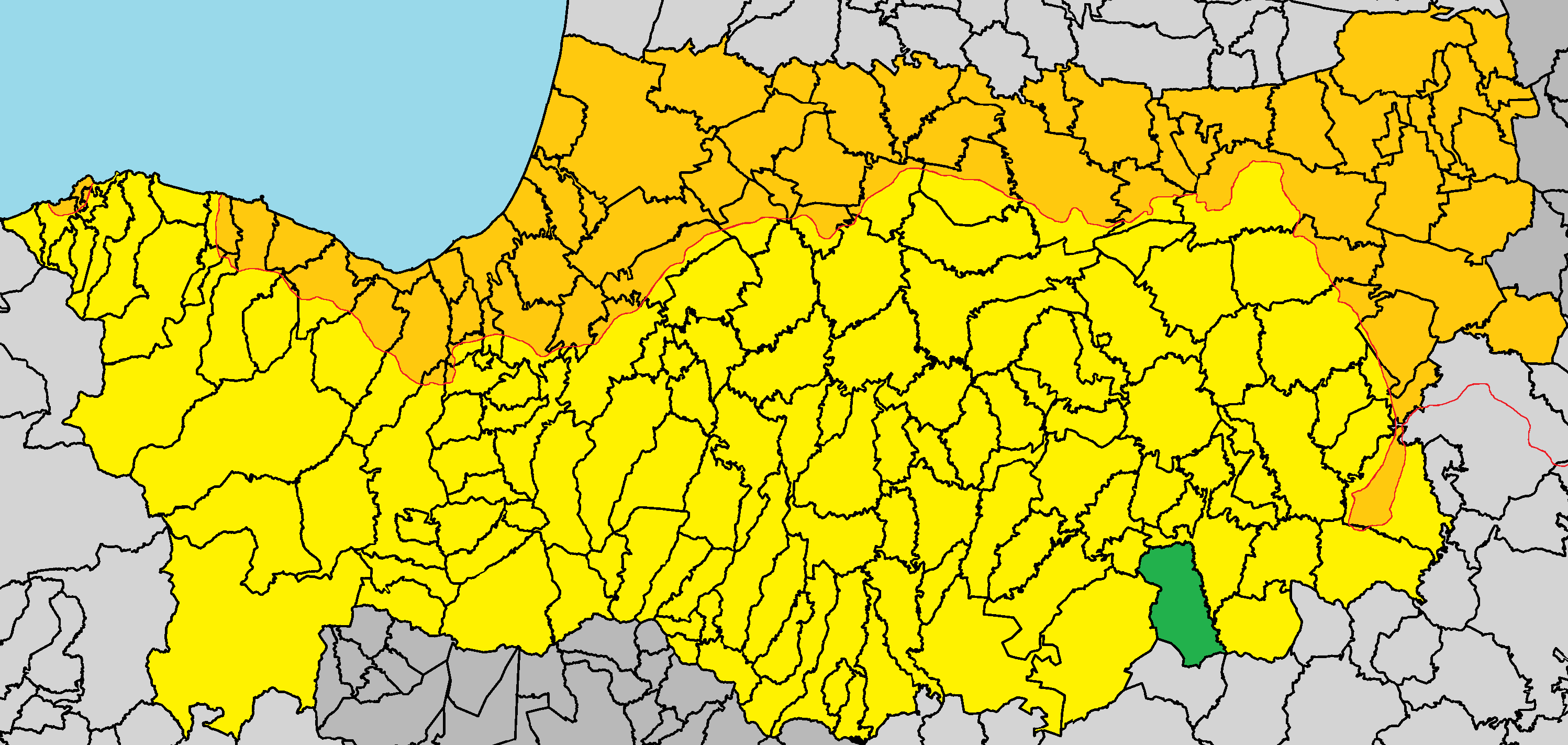

- Location in Cyprus
- Coordinates: 34°57′46″N 33°20′10″E
- Country: Cyprus
- District: Nicosia District

Population (2011)
  - Total: 646
- Time zone: UTC+2 (EET)
  - Summer (DST): UTC+3 (EEST)

Mathiatis (Greek: Μαθιάτης [locally [maˈθcatis]]; Turkish: Matyat) is a village located in the Nicosia District of Cyprus. Before 1960, it had a mixed Greek- and Turkish-Cypriot population.
