= Skylloura =

Skylloura: Σκυλλούρα (Greek); Yılmazköy (Turkish)
- Village
- Location in Cyprus
- Coordinates: 35°13′58″N 33°9′55″E
- Country (de jure): Cyprus
  - District: Nicosia District
- Country (de facto): Northern Cyprus
  - District: Lefkoşa District

Population (2011)
  - Total: 953
- Time zone: UTC+2 (EET)
  - Summer (DST): UTC+3 (EEST)

Skylloura (Greek: Σκυλλούρα; Turkish: Yılmazköy or Şillura) is a village located in the Nicosia District of Cyprus, about halfway between the towns of Morphou and Nicosia. It is administered by the Lefkoşa District of Northern Cyprus. In the town the two main roads Morphou-Nicosia and Kyrenia-Lapithos-Skylloura meet.

== History ==
It was a mixed village with a Greek Cypriot majority before the intercommunal violence of 1963–64. In 1958, Skylloura was the location of an incident. The British Cyprus Police came across 35 armed Greek Cypriots outside the village and arrested them. Instead of taking them to the police station, they were driven ten miles away to the Turkish Cypriot majority Gönyeli and told by British Army escorts to walk home and forced them to start at bayonet point. This led to them being attacked by Turkish Cypriots and while the British Cyprus Police responded with an armoured car within 5 minutes, eight of the prisoners died. An inquiry was held where it was revealed that the "take a walk" was a common military practice for civilian prisoners in Cyprus, though the police armoured car commanding officer admitted that it was "unlawful". The inquiry held that the police and military's actions were illegal and "unwise" given the status of inter-community relations in Cyprus.

A number of Turkish Cypriots were abducted from the village and killed by Greek Cypriot militia, which led to the Turkish Cypriot inhabitants fleeing to Turkish Cypriot villages and Nicosia. In the 1974 Turkish invasion of Cyprus, the Greek Cypriot inhabitants fled in the wake of the Turkish military advance. The village is currently mainly inhabited by its original Turkish Cypriot inhabitants, however, there is a military camp in the village, and a large segment of the population consists of the family of military personnel.
