= Turkish Cypriot enclaves =

Ethnic enclaves in Cyprus (1963–1974)

Ethnic map of Cyprus in 1973 Greek Cypriots Turkish Cypriot enclaves British military bases

The Turkish Cypriot enclaves were inhabited by Turkish Cypriots between the intercommunal violence of 1963–64 and the 1974 Turkish invasion of Cyprus.

== Events leading to the creation of the enclaves ==
In December 1963 the President of the Republic of Cyprus, Archbishop Makarios, citing Turkish Cypriot tactics aimed at obstructing the normal functioning of government, proposed several amendments to the post-colonial constitution of 1960. This precipitated a crisis between the Greek Cypriot majority and the Turkish Cypriot minority, and Turkish Cypriot representation in the government ended. The nature of this event is controversial. Greek Cypriots claim that Turkish Cypriots voluntarily withdrew from the institutions of the Republic of Cyprus, while the Turkish Cypriot narrative has it that the Turkish Cypriots were forcibly excluded.

After the rejection of the constitutional amendments by the Turkish Cypriot community the situation escalated into island-wide intercommunal violence. 103 to 109 Turkish Cypriot or mixed villages were attacked and 25,000–30,000 Turkish Cypriots became refugees. According to official records, 364 Turkish Cypriots and 174 Greek Cypriots were killed. Turkish Cypriots consequently started living in enclaves; the republic's structure was changed unilaterally by Makarios and Nicosia was divided by the Green Line, with the deployment of UNFICYP troops.

== Situation in the enclaves ==
The enclaves were scattered all over the island. The enclaves were deprived of many necessities. Restrictions on the enclaves began to be eased after 1967 and many Turkish Cypriots began to return to the villages they'd left in 1963.

=== Ban on goods ===
The Greek Cypriot-run Republic of Cyprus banned the possession of certain items by Turkish Cypriots and the entrance of these items to the enclaves. The restrictions were aimed not only at restricting the military activities of Turkish Cypriots, but also to prevent their return to economic normality. As for fuels, all kinds of fuels including kerosene were initially banned, but the ban on kerosene was lifted by October 1964. The ban on petrol and diesel did remain in force until that time and hindered food supply to the enclaves. Ban on building materials prevented the restoration of houses damaged by fighting when winter approached, and the ban on woolen clothing affected the supply of clothing to Turkish Cypriots, especially putting the displaced in a concerning situation. The restriction on tent materials further blocked the construction of temporary places of residence for the displaced. Below is a list of banned items as of 7 October 1964, according to a report by the United Nations Secretary-General:

- Accumulators
- Ammonium nitrate
- Angle iron
- Automobile spare parts
- Bags
- Cables
- Camouflage netting
- Cartridges, shotgun
- Cement
- Crushed metal
- Crushed stone
- Electrical detonators
- Exploders and explosives
- Fuel, in large amounts
- Galvanometers
- Iron pickets
- Iron poles and rods
- Khaki-colored cloth
- Mine detectors
- Radio sets
- Safety fuses
- Sand
- Studs for boots
- Sulfur
- Telephones
- Tents and tent material
- Thick steel plates
- Timber
- Tires
- Wire, including barbed wire
- Wire-cutters
- Woollen clothing (if it can be used militarily)

=== Travel restrictions ===
The freedom of movement of Turkish Cypriots were restricted in this period. The Greek Cypriot police committed what was called by the UN Secretary-General "excessive checks and searches and apparently unnecessary obstructions", which instilled fear in Turkish Cypriots who had to travel. Turkish Cypriots suffered the harassment of nationalist Greek Cypriot officers at control points, airports and government offices. The Secretary-General also noted his concerns about arbitrary arrest and detention. Greek Cypriot police imposed restrictions on Turkish Cypriot travel outside the enclave of North Nicosia. Initially, the movement of Turkish Cypriots in and out of Lefka was not allowed at all, the restriction was relaxed by October 1964 to allow them to travel eastwards, but not westwards towards Limnitis. Turkish Cypriot doctors were also not allowed to travel freely to carry out their profession, the Greek Cypriots insisted that they should be searched.

=== Economic situation ===
The period of 1963–74 saw widening economic disparities between the two communities. Whilst the Greek Cypriot economy benefited from flourishing tourism and finance sectors, Turkish Cypriots grew increasingly poor and unemployment increased. The enclaves were put under an economic embargo by the Greek Cypriot administration of the Republic of Cyprus, trade between communities was blocked. Due to travel restrictions, a large number of Turkish Cypriots had to leave their previous jobs. Refugees, meanwhile, had been uprooted from their old sources of income. The period thus saw the beginning of aid from the Turkish government, as by 1968, Turkey had started to give about £8,000,000 a year to Turkish Cypriots.

== List of Turkish Cypriot enclaves ==
- Kazivera (Gaziveren)
- Kokkina (Erenköy)
- Limnitis (Yeşilırmak)
- Lefka (Lefke)
- Nicosia-Agirda (Lefkoşa-Ağırdağ)
- Chatos (Çatoz/Serdarlı)
- Galinoporni (Kaleburnu)
- Kofinou (Geçitkale)
- Louroujina (Akincilar)
- Angolemi (Taşpınar)
- Pergamos (Beyarmudu)

Smaller enclaves within the main cities:

- Paphos (Mouttalos/Kasaba)
- Larnaca (İskele)
- Famagusta (Mağusa/Suriçi)

== See also ==
- History of Cyprus
- Cyprus dispute
- Modern history of Cyprus
- Enclave
