= Black gang (ship) =

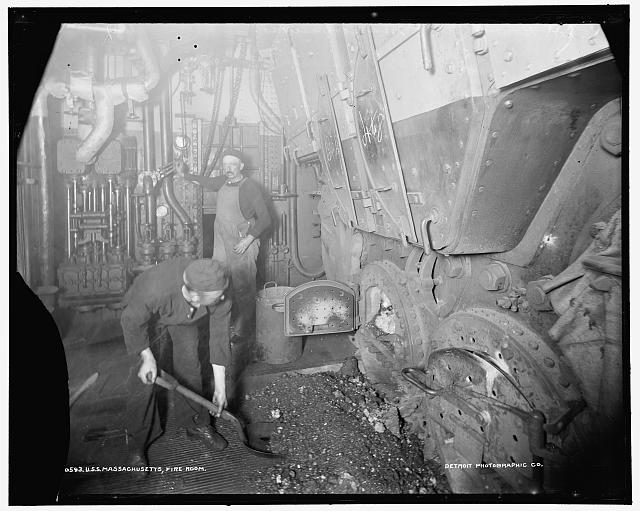
Coal dust adhered to the perspiration-drenched skin and clothing of men shoveling soft coal in the radiant heat of a hot boiler firebox.

The black gang are the members of a ship's crew who work in the fire room/engine room; they are also called stokers or firemen. They are called "black" because of the soot and coal dust that is thick in the air in the fire room/engine room. The term began being used in the days of coal-fired steamships. The term is commonly used in the United States Coast Guard and United States Navy to describe personnel in "M" and "B" divisions.
