= Agirda =

Agirda: Αγύρτα (Greek); Ağırdağ (Turkish)
- Location in Cyprus
- Coordinates: 35°17′45″N 33°15′59″E
- Country (de jure): Cyprus
  - District: Kyrenia District
- Country (de facto): Northern Cyprus
  - District: Girne District

Population (2011)
  - Total: 745
- Time zone: UTC+2 (EET)
  - Summer (DST): UTC+3 (EEST)

Agirda (Greek: Αγύρτα; Turkish: Ağırdağ) is a Turkish Cypriot village in the Kyrenia District of Cyprus. It is under the de facto control of Northern Cyprus. Its population in 2011 was 745.
