= Thirteen Points =

1963 proposed amendments to the Constitution of Cyprus

The Thirteen Points were a group of amendments to the Constitution of Cyprus proposed on 30 November 1963 by Archbishop Makarios, the first president of Cyprus, that altered the ways in which Greek Cypriots and Turkish Cypriots were represented in government. Upon being proposed after two years of peace between the two groups, the amendments were rejected by Turkish Cypriots, sparking a crisis between the two groups that led to widespread intercommunal violence and culminated in the Bloody Christmas conflict.

== Overview ==
The proposed amendments were:

- The veto rights of the Republic of Cyprus' Greek president and Turkish vice president to be abandoned.
- The Turkish vice president to deputise for the Greek president in case of his temporary absence or incapacity to perform his duties.
- The Greek president and Turkish vice president of the House of Representatives to be elected by the House as a whole and not, as at present, the president by the Greek members of the House and the vice president by the Turkish members of the House.
- The Turkish vice president of the House of Representatives to deputise for the Greek president of the House in case of his temporary absence or incapacity to perform his duties.
- The constitutional provisions regarding separate majorities for enactment of certain laws by the House of Representatives to be abolished.
- Unified municipalities to be established.
- The administration of justice to be unified.
- The division of the security forces into police and gendarmerie to be abolished.
- The numerical strength of the security forces and defence forces to be determined by a law.
- The proportion of Greek and Turkish Cypriots participating in public service and forces to be modified in proportion to the ratio of Greek and Turkish Cypriots populating the Republic of Cyprus.
- The number of the members of the Public Service Commission to be reduced from ten to five.
- All decisions of the Public Service Commission to be taken by simple majority.
- The Greek Communal Chamber to be abolished.

The most serious constitutional problem the newly established Republic of Cyprus faced in daily politics stemmed from an issue regarding municipalities; Turkish Cypriots strove for the creation of separate municipalities for Greeks and Turks, while Greek Cypriots aimed for mixed ones. Makarios took into consideration the probability of changing the constitution unilaterally; despite being warned of constitutional collapse by his own cabinet minister Glafkos Clerides (who later became the 4th president of Cyprus), Greece's foreign minister Evangelos Averoff, and the Turkish government, Makarios proceeded with the changes. He calculated the political instability of Turkey and Greece, and believed that his proposal would be backed by the United Nations.

On 30 November 1963, Makarios handed a memo of the 13 points to the Turkish Cypriot side. Fazıl Küçük, Rauf Denktaş, and the Turkish government rejected all 13. Turkish Cypriots filed a lawsuit against the amendments in the Supreme Constitutional Court of Cyprus. Having been proposed after two years of peace between the two groups, the amendments and their rejection sparked a crisis between Greek and Turkish Cypriots that led to widespread intercommunal violence and culminated in the Bloody Christmas conflict.

== Sources ==
- James, Alan (28 November 2001). Keeping the Peace in the Cyprus Crisis of 1963–64. Palgrave Macmillan. ISBN 978-1-4039-0089-0.
- Göktepe, Ci̇hat (2003). British Foreign Policy Towards Turkey, 1959–1965. Psychology Press. ISBN 978-0-7146-5396-9.
- Ker-Lindsay, James (21 April 2011). The Cyprus Problem: What Everyone Needs to Know®. Oxford University Press. ISBN 978-0-19-983135-7.
- Mirbagheri, Farid (1 May 2014). Cyprus and International Peacemaking 1964–1986. Routledge. ISBN 978-1-136-67745-8.
- Richter, Heinz (2010). A Concise History of Modern Cyprus, 1878–2009. Verlag Franz Philipp Rutzen. ISBN 978-3-938646-53-3.
