= Omorfita =

Omorfita Ομορφίτα (Greek) Küçük Kaymaklı (Turkish)
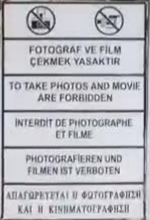
- Warning sign in Nicosia

- Location in Cyprus
- Coordinates: 35°11′30″N 33°22′30″E
- Country: Cyprus
  - District: Nicosia District
  - Municipality: Nicosia
- Country (partially controlled by): Northern Cyprus
  - District: Lefkoşa District
  - Municipality: Nicosia Turkish Municipality

Population (2011)
  - Total: 10,856
- Time zone: UTC+2 (EET)
  - Summer (DST): UTC+3 (EEST)

Omorfita or Kuchuk Kaimakli (Greek: Ομορφίτα [omorˈfita]; Turkish: Küçük Kaymaklı [cyˈtʃyc kajmakˈɫɯ]) is a northeastern quarter of Nicosia, Cyprus. Omorfita has been divided since 1974, its biggest chunk being under the de facto control of Northern Cyprus.

== Name ==
It is Ομορφίτα in Greek, possibly derived from Morphou or from the Greek word for 'beautiful'. It is Küçük Kaymaklı in Turkish, which means 'small Kaimakli', the neighbouring suburb of Kaimakli being referred to as 'big Kaimakli' in Turkish. It seems that Kaimakli derives from kaymak meaning [the] froth [in a cup of local coffee]. However, Rupert Gunnis states that the suburb took its name from a farm which produced clotted cream which in Turkish is known as Kaymak. Küçük Kaimakli was always called Omorfita by Greek Cypriots, meaning “beautiful.” Goodwin, however, claims that the settlers who founded the village came from Morphou and that this is the reason why the village was called Omorfita.

== Administration and demographics ==
Omorfita was formerly an independent village, but was annexed to the municipality of Nicosia on 29 March 1968, the village area becoming a Neighbourhood.

The population in 1946 was 2,231, consisting of 1,236 Greek Cypriots, 995 Turkish Cypriots. At the last Census (2011) it had a population of 10,856.

Area	Population (2011)
Omorfita (Turkish control)	10,572
Omorfita (Cyprus government sector)	284
TOTAL	10,856

The village was in the southern part of the village authority area, south of St. Hilarion Road. The church of St. Demetrianos dates to the early part of the 20th century and is a single nave with a semi-hexagonal apse on the exterior. The nave is divided into 3 bays, with a dome over the central transept bay. The dome is cylindrical, covered in round clay tiles. The roof over the apse was 2 pitched, the exterior walls appear to have been in unplastered dressed ashlar. The church was located in the centre of the nucleated village. The mosque Küçük Kaymaklı Cami (Kuchuk Kaimaklı Jami) is in the south of the village, south of the church.

The centre of Omorfita is about 1 mile north of the historic centre of Nicosia (i.e. Saray/Atatürk Square) and is 433 ft. above sea level, with the river Pediaios passing along its northern border.

Map of Kaimakli and Omorphita/Kuchuk Kaimakli in relation to Nicosia, in 1885

== History ==
Omorfita was always a mixed village. According to the Ottoman census of 1831, Christians constituted almost 55% of the population. However, this proportion declined to 47.5% by 1931. Fifteen years later, the 1946 census shows that the Greek Cypriot proportion had again increased to 55%. During the late 1950s it was the scene of intensive fighting between Greek Cypriot and Turkish Cypriot irregulars. During this time many Greek Cypriots left Omorfita and the Turkish Cypriots left Kaimakli. In 1960, the population of Omorfita was 6,259 (1,123 Greek Cypriots and 5,126 Turkish Cypriots).

=== Current Division ===
Almost half of the village is still situated in the buffer zone or militarized areas. However, the other non-affected parts of the village are mainly occupied by its original Turkish Cypriot inhabitants and displaced Turkish Cypriots who moved there sometime after 1974. In addition, there are many other non-displaced Turkish Cypriots from elsewhere who have moved to this neighbourhood over the past two decades, living in new developments. In addition, many Turkish nationals who work in Cyprus live in this neighbourhood.

An area of 71 streets in the eastern part of the Neighbourhood remains under the control of the Cyprus government.

When Greek Cypriot paramilitaries attacked the village in December 1963, all the Turkish Cypriot inhabitants of Omorfita fled their homes. Most of these displaced persons moved to the Turkish Cypriot quarter of the walled city Nicosia or to Ortakeuy, Guenyeli and Hamid Mandres. Approximately 5,500 Turkish Cypriots were displaced from Omorfita. The third conflict-related displacement took place in the summer of 1974, when all the Greek Cypriots from the village fled from the advancing Turkish army and Turkish Cypriot Fighters in July and August 1974. Currently, like the rest of the displaced Greek Cypriots, the Greek Cypriots of Omorfita are scattered throughout the island’s south, with large pockets in towns. The number of the Greek Cypriots who were displaced in 1974 is approximately 2,200 (2,160 in the 1960 census)
