= Gönyeli =

Gönyeli: Κιόνελι (Greek); Gönyeli (Turkish)
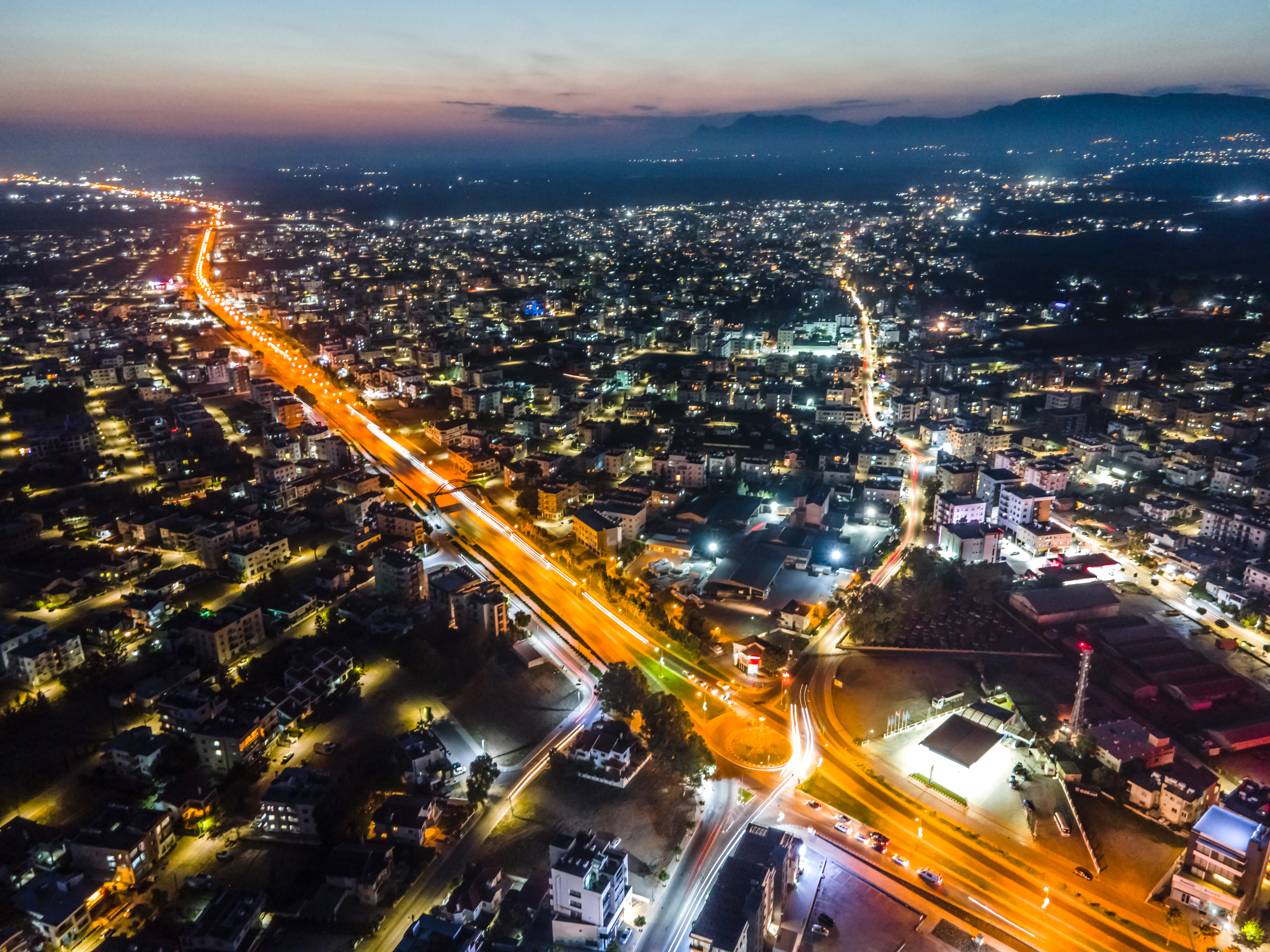
- Monument of National Struggle and Liberation in Gönyeli

- Location in Cyprus
- Coordinates: 35°12′59″N 33°18′17″E
- Country (de jure): Cyprus
  - District: Nicosia District
- Country (de facto): Northern Cyprus
  - District: Lefkoşa District

Government
  - Mayor: Ahmet Yalçın Benli

Population (2011)
  - Total: 11,671
  - Municipality: 17,277
- Time zone: UTC+2 (EET)
  - Summer (DST): UTC+3 (EEST)
- Website: Turkish Cypriot municipality

Gönyeli (Greek: Κιόνελι, romanized: Kioneli; Turkish: Gönyeli) is a town in Cyprus, near the capital city Nicosia. It is de facto under the control of Northern Cyprus. Over the years the town has merged with North Nicosia, making it connurbated with the city. Its population as of 2011 is 11,671.

== History ==
Before the Ottoman conquest of Cyprus in 1571, the area consisted of empty fields. Upon the conquest, two families from Anatolia that of Kurt Ali from Anamur and Mehmet Efendi from Aksaray, settled here and founded Gönyeli. Over time, as the families grew in population, the village grew as a Turkish-speaking farming community. Gönyeli was the site of the first intercommunal violence in Cyprus, in which armed Turkish Cypriots murdered eight Greek Cypriots. It was also one of the first towns to be captured following the Turkish invasion of Cyprus in 1974.

== Culture ==
The football club Gönyeli Spor Kulübü is based in Gönyeli. Gönyeli's stadium, Ali Naci Karacan Stadı (named for journalist Ali Naci Karacan), houses football matches as well as concerts and the annual 23 April Children's Day events.

Every July, the Gönyeli International Folk Dance Festival takes place in the town center. The event lasts one week, with groups of dancers from countries such as Bulgaria, Romania and Turkey performing traditional folk dance.

Gönyeli is a popular town for students looking to rent accommodation as it is about 15 minutes driving distance from the Nicosia-based Near East University.

== International relations ==
=== Twin towns – sister cities ===
Gönyeli is twinned with:

- Kızılcahamam, Ankara, Turkey (since 2009)
- Sarıyer, Istanbul, Turkey
