= United Nations Security Council Resolution 353 =

UN Security Council Resolution 353
- The Turkish Republic of Northern Cyprus (highlighted)
- Date: 20 July 1974
- Meeting no.: 1,781
- Code: S/RES/353 (Document)
- Subject: Cyprus
- Voting summary: 15 voted for; None voted against; None abstained
- Result: Adopted

Security Council composition
- Permanent members: China; France; Soviet Union; United Kingdom; United States
- Non-permanent members: Australia; Austria; Byelorussian SSR; Cameroon; Costa Rica; Indonesia; Iraq; Kenya; Mauritania; Peru

United Nations Security Council Resolution 353, adopted unanimously on 20 July 1974 was a Resolution in which the Council demanded the immediate withdrawal of foreign military personnel present in the Republic of Cyprus in contravention of paragraph 1 of the United Nations Charter. The resolution goes on to call upon Greece, Turkey and the United Kingdom to immediately enter into negotiations to restore peace in the area and constitutional government on the island.

Resolution 353 did not say anything about the military personnel that Turkey, Greece, and the UK have the right to deploy in accordance with the international agreements of 1960 and the Constitution of the Republic of Cyprus:

"4. Requests the withdrawal without delay from the Republic of Cyprus of foreign military personnel present otherwise than under the authority of international agreements, including those whose withdrawal was requested by the President of the Republic of Cyprus, Archbishop Makarios, in his letter of 2 July 1974".

== See also ==
- Cyprus dispute
- Greek–Turkish relations
- History of Cyprus
- List of United Nations Security Council Resolutions 301 to 400 (1971–1976)
