= Turkish Resistance Organisation =

1958–1974 Turkish Cypriot paramilitary organisation

- Türk Mukavemet Teşkilatı
- Leader: Rauf Denktaş
- Dates active: 1958–1974
- Headquarters: Cyprus
- Ideology: Taksim; Turkish nationalism; Anti-communism; Ethnic nationalism
- Political position: Right-wing
- Size: 3,000 volunteers; 17,151 (in 1974)

The Turkish Resistance Organisation (Turkish: Türk Mukavemet Teşkilatı, TMT) was a Turkish Cypriot pro-taksim paramilitary resistance organisation formed by Rauf Denktaş and TAF officer Rıza Vuruşkan in 1958 as an guerilla organisation to counter the Greek Cypriot fighters organization EOKA. The name of the organization was changed twice. In 1967 to Mücahit (Mujahideen), and became the Security Forces Command in 1976.

== Formation ==
The Greek Cypriot paramilitary organization, EOKA started its anti-British activities for Enosis, the union of the island with Greece. This caused a "Cretan syndrome" within the Turkish Cypriot community, as its members feared that they would be forced to leave the island in such a case as was the case with Cretan Turks; as such, they preferred the continuation of the British rule and later, taksim, the division of the island. Due to the Turkish Cypriots' support for the British, the EOKA leader Georgios Grivas declared them an enemy. The first underground organization formed by Turkish Cypriots to oppose enosis was Volkan. This organization was founded in 1956. or September 1955 according to different sources, and purportedly with the support of the British administration. Roni Alasor, however, claims that TMT's organisation structure and base had been formed as early as 1950 with its centre in the Yenişehir section of Ankara. During this period, other resistance organizations were founded, such as the Turkish Resistance Legion for the Movement Legion (KİTEM), 9 September Front or Kara Çete ("Black Gang"), which reportedly had the support of Fazıl Küçük, but these turned out to be unsuccessful attempts and joined Volkan.

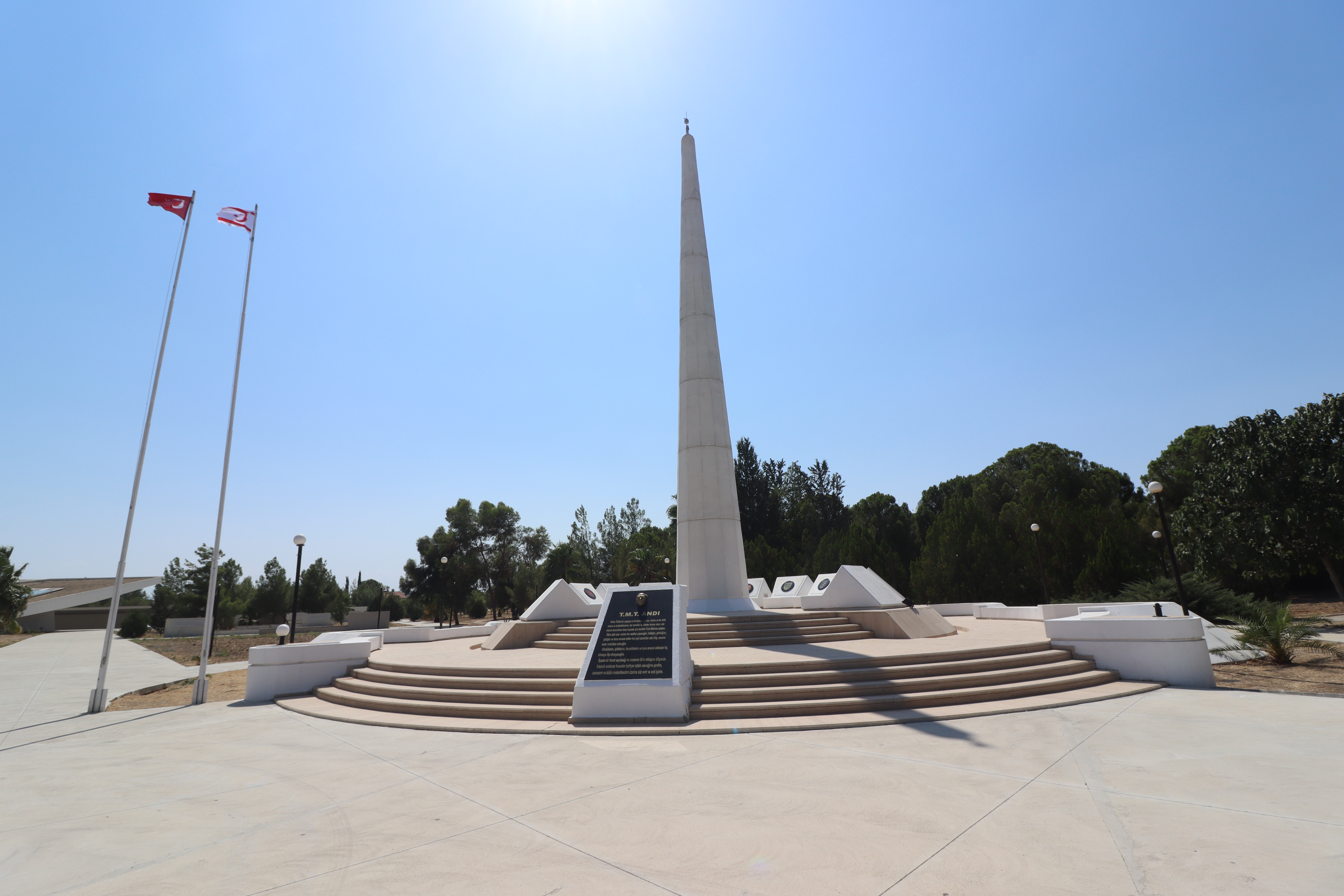
Turkish Resistance Organization Monument in Cumhuriyet Park, North Nicosia, 2022

The exact date of establishment of the TMT varies across several sources, the given dates are 15 or 23 November 1957. Rauf Denktaş, however, claimed that the organization was established on 27 November. The establishment took place in the house of Kemal Tanrıverdi in Nicosia, the Turkish Cypriot attaché at the Turkish embassy, with the participation of Denktaş and Burhan Nalbantoğlu. Its declaration of establishment, which called all Turkish Cypriot members of resistance organizations to unite under the TMT, was printed on 26 November 1957 by the Lefkoşa Türk Lisesi (Nicosia Turkish High School). Initially, it only had about 100 members.

The TMT was initially formed with a local initiative, with the aims of raising awareness in Turkey about the Cypriot issue and military training and supply for Turkish Cypriot fighters. However, its leaders were aware that such an organization would not be popular without Turkish support, and thus, no organization or efforts to establish a leadership took place at this time. On 2 January 1958, Denktaş and Küçük flew to Ankara to meet with Fatin Rüştü Zorlu. In the meeting, Zorlu asked them if they would be able to receive the weapons sent by Turkey, and Denktaş replied positively, after which Zorlu brought the issue to the attention of the Chief of Staff of the Turkish Armed Forces. After several months of consideration, Turkey decided to support the organization on the condition that Turkish support would be kept secret. Daniş Karabelen was assigned to organize the TMT's foundation.

== Structure & Soldiers ==
TMT's members were called mujahid. (Turkish: Mücahit), a term used for Muslims who fight on behalf of the faith or the Muslim community. The mujahids would have no ranks and their names were unknown amongst each other. Communication with its members in Cyprus was by radio and the honorary leader of the TMT was Fatin Rüştü Zorlu.

General Daniş Karabelen, in charge of unconventional warfare office of Turkey, was leading the irregular Turkish Cypriot attacks on Greek Cypriot properties. The Turkish state in 1950s had sent to Cyprus Turkish officers and special forces veterans who arrived secretly and presented themselves as bankers, teachers and business men and trained Turkish Cypriots in tactics of unconventional warfare.

== Ideology ==
The TMT was an ethno-nationalist organization, with a right-wing stance.

TMT's main goal was to counter the Greek Cypriot demand for enosis.

TMT was active mainly between 1958 and 1974, promoting partition (in Turkish: Taksim) of Cyprus. TMT claims that their efforts were simply in response to a real threat against their community by EOKA, after 1963, by the Cypriot Government, which by then was under exclusive Greek Cypriot control and had ended representing Turkish Cypriots.

== Strength ==
Between 1964 and 1967, the TMT maintained a force of about 5,000 fighters, although this was somewhat weakened in 1966 and 1967, when around 950 men, who had interrupted their studies or never had a chance to commence them, went to Turkey to enroll in universities.

== See also ==
- Bloody Christmas (1963)
- Cyprus dispute
- Turkish invasion of Cyprus

== Sources ==
- Alasor, Roni (1999). Sifreli Mesaj: "Trene bindir!" [Encrypted message: "Get on the train!"] (in Turkish). Cologne: Berfin. ISBN 978-960-03-3260-5.
- Apeyitou, Elena (2010). "Turkish-Cypriot nationalism: its history and development (1571–1960)". The Cyprus Review. in Solomou, Emilios; Faustmann, Hubert, eds. (2010). Colonial Cyprus: 1878–1960. Nicosia: University of Nicosia Press. ISBN 978-9963-634-89-7.
- Isachenko, Daria (2012). The Making of Informal States: Statebuilding in Northern Cyprus and Transdniestria. Palgrave Macmillan. ISBN 978-0-230-39206-9.
- Emircan, Mehmet Salih (2007). Kuzey Kıbrıs Türk Cumhuriyeti'nde Tören, Bayram ve Anma Günleri (in Turkish). Turkish Cypriot Association of Former Fighter.
- Lange, Matthew (2011). Educations in Ethnic Violence: Identity, Educational Bubbles, and Resource Mobilization. Cambridge University Press. ISBN 978-1-139-50544-4.
- Patrick, Richard Arthur (1976). Political geography and the Cyprus conflict, 1963–1971. Dept. of Geography, Faculty of Environmental Studies, University of Waterloo. ISBN 978-0-921083-05-4.
- Stylianou-Lambert, Theopisti; Bounia, Alexandra (2012). War Museums and Photography. University of Leicester, Museum and Society, 10(3). pp. 185–186.
