= Nicosia Post Office =

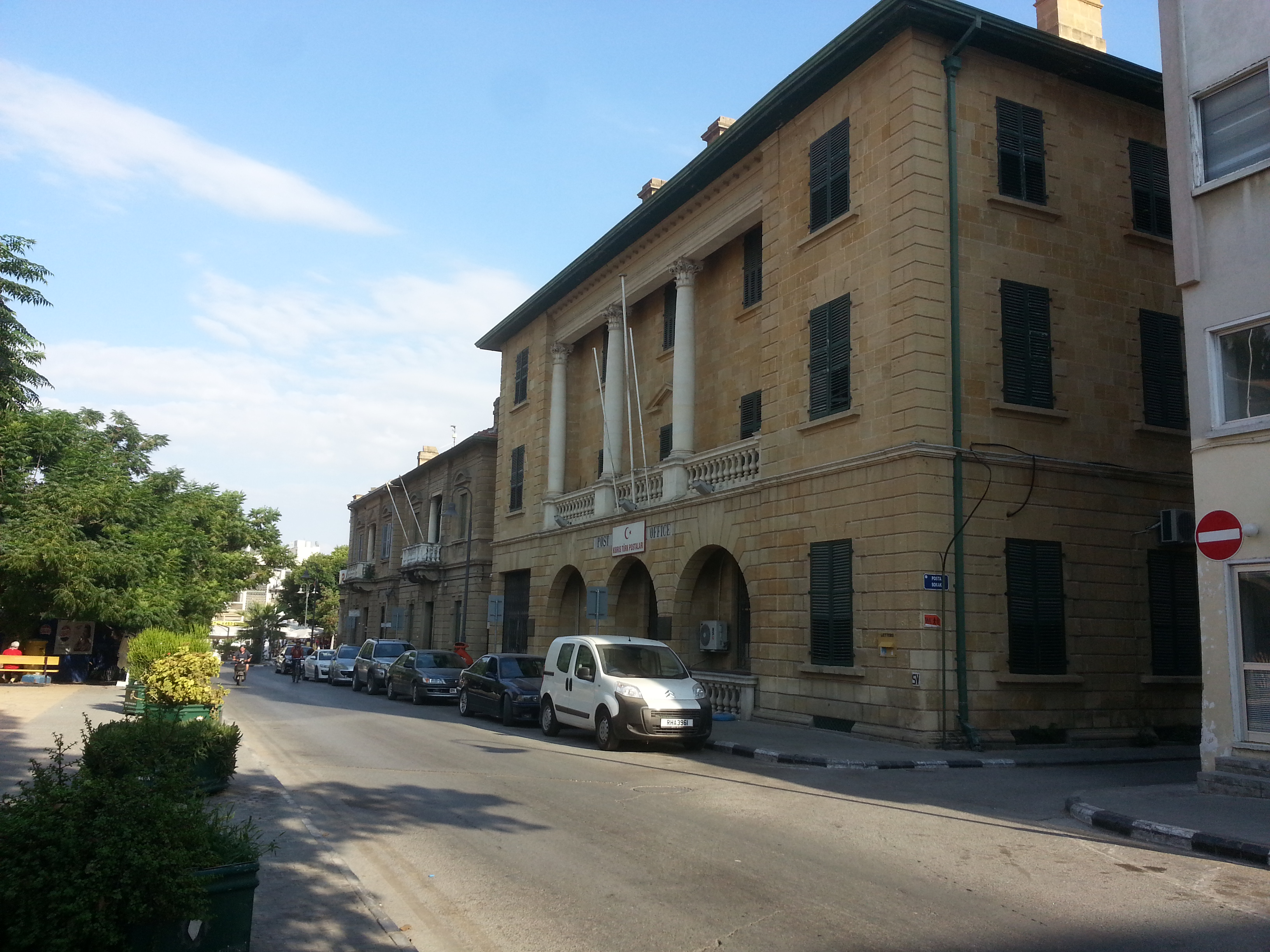

General information
- Type: Post office
- Location: North Nicosia

Nicosia Post Office is a historical building in Nicosia, currently located in North Nicosia. It is located very close to the Sarayönü Square.

Between 1918 and 1925, the postal services were located at shops owned by the Evkaf Administration on Girne Avenue. In 1925, the British colonial administration built the current building on what was then an empty piece of land. On 20 November 1955, it suffered a bombing by the EOKA militants, which resulted in significant damage. It was continuously used for postal services, with Greek and Turkish Cypriots working together. After the intercommunal violence of 1963-64, the post office fell in the Turkish sector of the city and was used by the Provisional Turkish Cypriot Administration as the headquarters of the Turkish Cypriot postal services. Until 1989, the Bayrak Radio and Television also used the first and second floors of the building. The building is listed as an important historical building by the Turkish Cypriot Department of Antiquities and was officially transferred to the Ministry of Transport and Public Works on 23 December 2002. It was renovated and the renovation was completed on 23 December 2003.

The building has three floors and was constructed in the Neo-Renaissance architectural style. The entrance gate is located on the northern front façade, where three semicircular arches are located. The first floor of the front façade has a balcony with four Roman-style columns and a Neo-Renaissance balustrade. There are decorations above windows that were influenced by Classical Greek architecture.
