= ABC plan (Cyprus) =

ABC plan (also known as the Nimetz initiative) was a proposed settlement of the Cyprus dispute, presented by the USA but co-authored by Britain and Canada as well, hence the abbreviation ABC (American-British-Canadian). The settlement was proposed in 1979. It projected a loose federation between the Greek and Turkish community of Cyprus and it was based on previous agreements between Greek and Turkish Cypriot leaders, and UN resolutions. It was rejected by all sides.

== The plan ==
The plan consisted of twelve points, according to Eleftherios Michael most important were:

- The creation of a Bicommunal Bizonal Federation,
- Bicameral legislature,
- Withdrawal of all foreign troops,
- Turkish Cypriots to give back to Greek Cypriots substantial amount of land.

The central federal government would be in charge of Foreign Affairs, Defence, finance and economy, ports, customs controls and immigration.

== Reception and aftermath ==
Newly elected Greek Cypriot president Spyros Kyprianou was fast to reject the plan, Turkey followed. Even so, the Nimetz initiative was utilized by other UN general secretaries as a base to new plans.

== See also ==
- Annan Plan

== Sources ==
- Kordoni, Artemis (2016). Οι διπλωματικές προσπάθειες επίλυσης του Κυπριακού από το 1974 ως το 2013 (Diplomatic efforts to solve Cyprus problem from 1975 to 2013) (PDF) (Thesis).
- Michael, Eleftherios A. (4 September 2015). Peacemaking Strategies in Cyprus: In Search of Lasting Peace. Cambridge Scholars Publishing. ISBN 978-1-4438-8194-4.
