= Lusignan Palace =

Former royal palace in Nicosia, Cyprus

Coordinates: 35.1781°N 33.3609°E

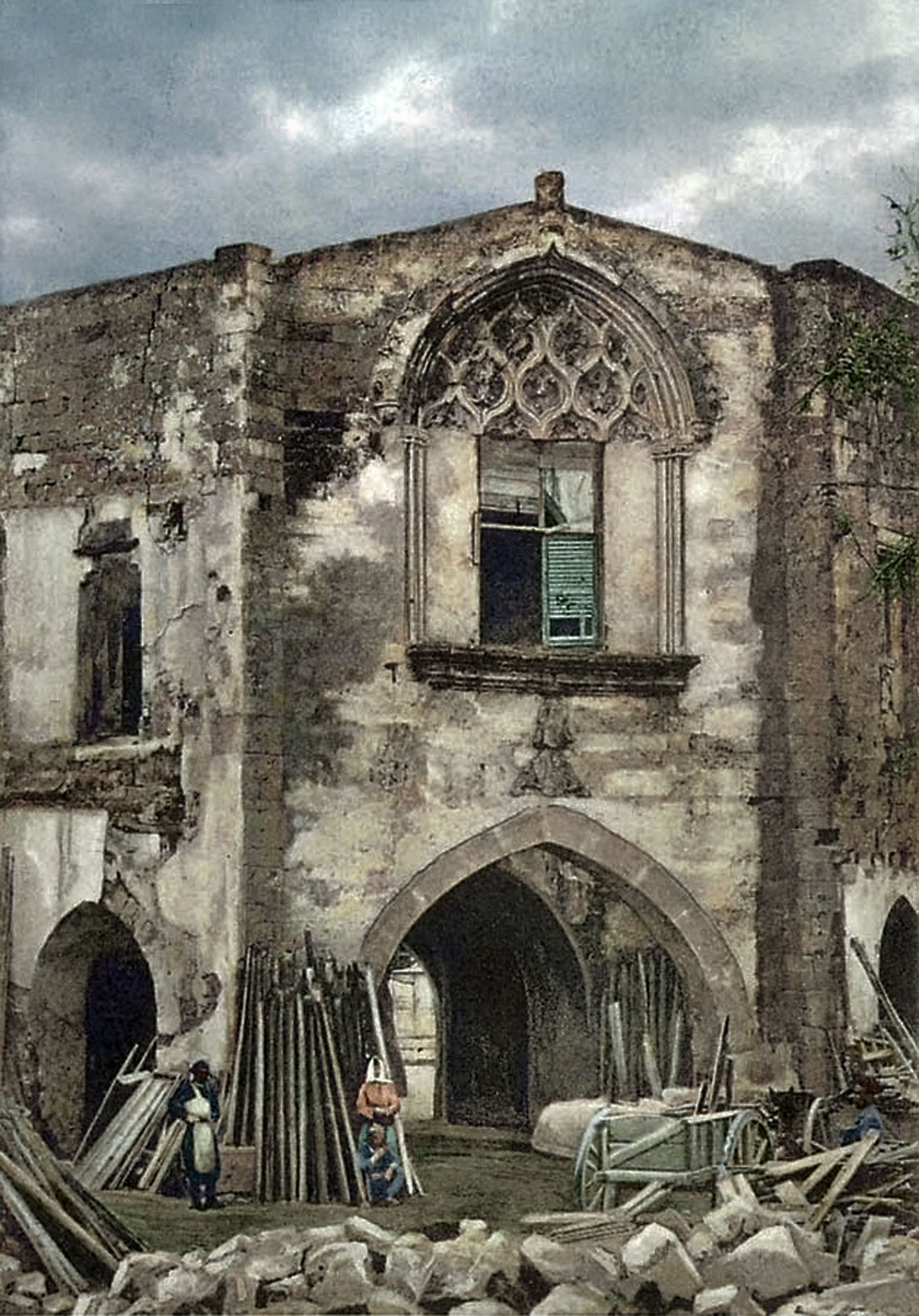
A view of the gate tower of the Lusignan palace

The Lusignan Palace was a Gothic-style royal residence in Nicosia, Cyprus, built in the 15th century. Serving as the seat of power for the kings of Cyprus, and later for Venetian and Ottoman governors, the palace stood prominently on the northwest side of Sarayönü Square. It dominated the area until its demolition in 1904, when the British replaced it with the Nicosia Law Courts building, which still stands there.

== Name ==
The Lusignan palace was referred to as the Palazzo del Governo during the Venetian period. Durin the Ottoman period, it was referred to as "Saray", Seraglio or "Hükümet Konağı" (English: Government House). Under the British, it was also referred to as Konak.

== History ==
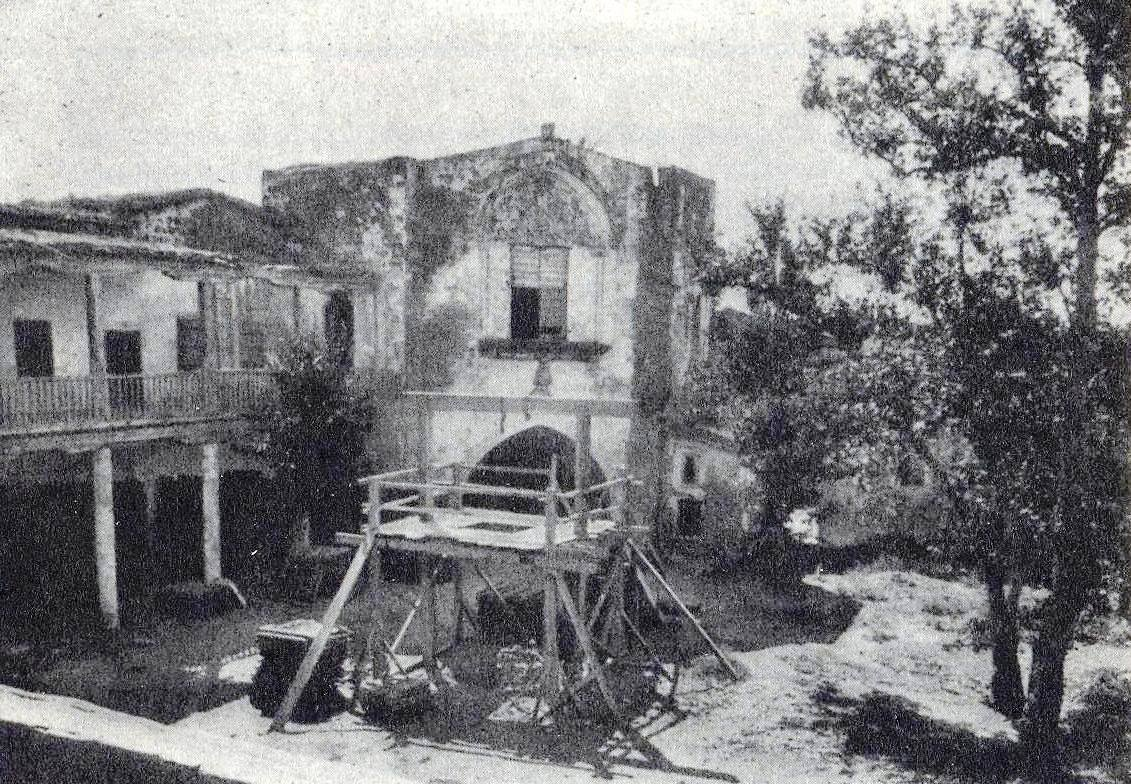
The Lusignan palace

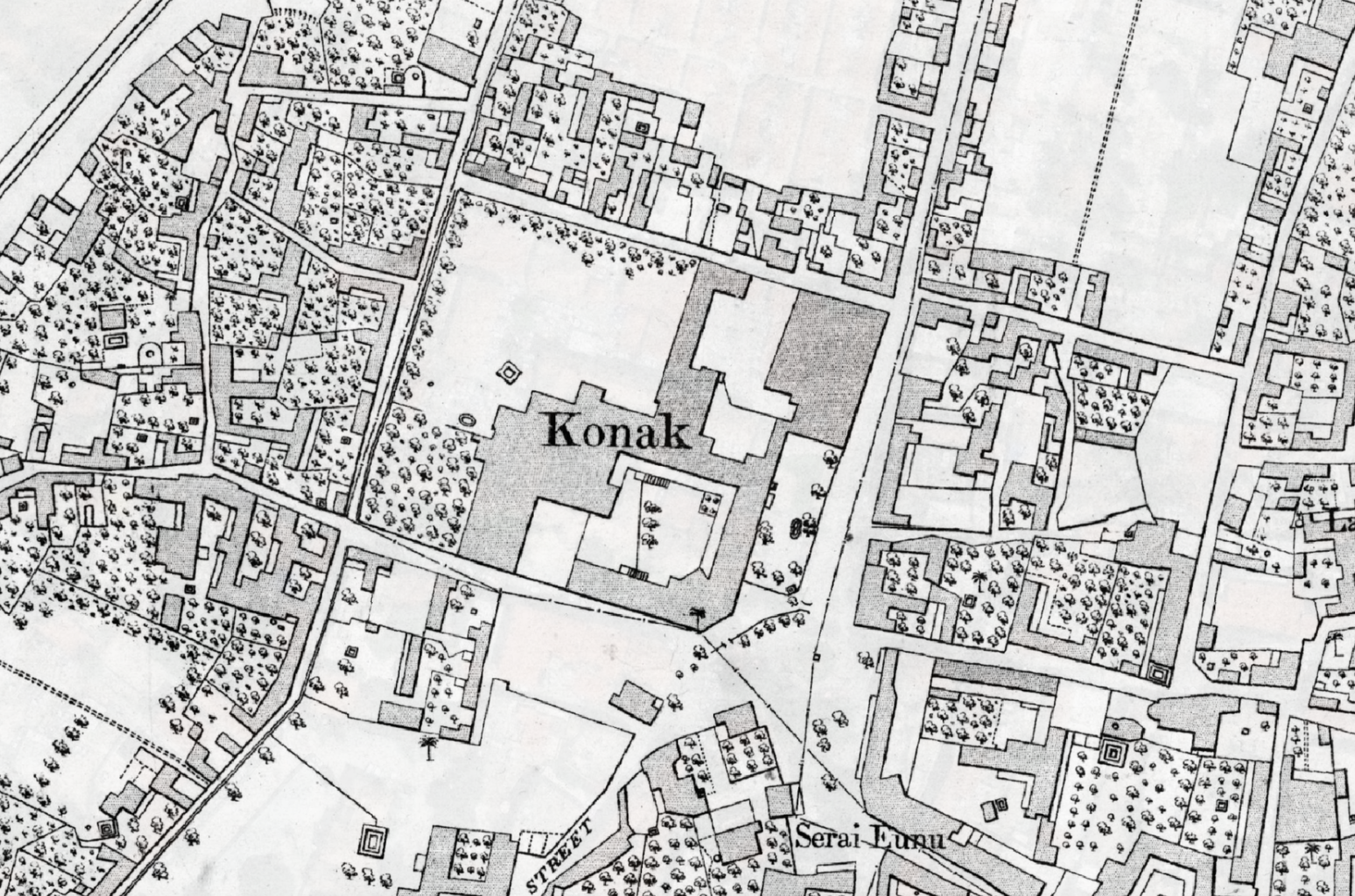
The Lusignan palace (Konak) as depicted on the Kitchener map of Nicosia (1882)

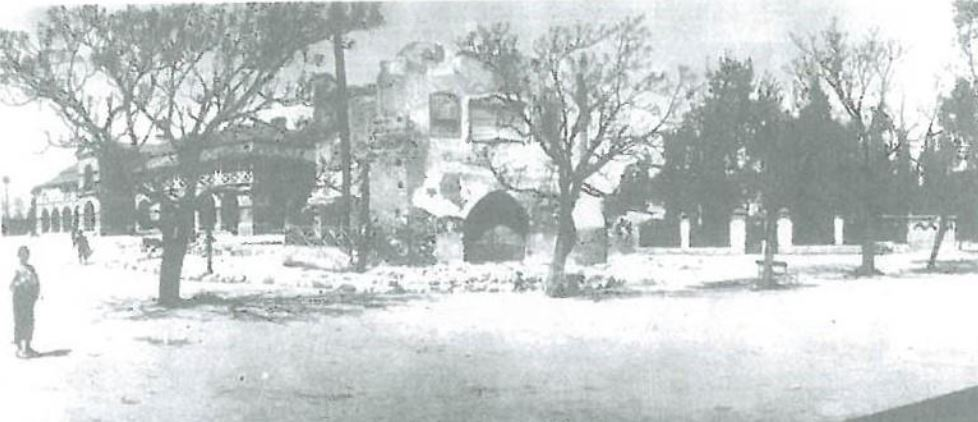
The Lusignan palace and Sarayönü Square

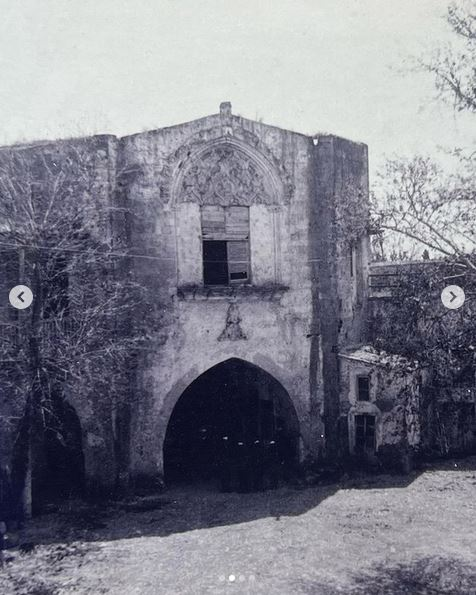
The gate tower with the gothic window

=== House of Lusignan ===
The Lusignan Palace was the third royal residence of the Lusignan dynasty in Nicosia. Originally constructed as the residence of Sir Hugh de la Baume, the Constable of Cyprus, it became a royal palace after the Mamluks burned the second palace, during their campaigns against Cyprus between 1424 and 1426. This transition occurred in 1427 during the reign of King Janus (1375–1432), following structural modifications to accommodate the royal family.

=== Venetian rule ===
When the Republic of Venice seized Cyprus in 1489, the palace underwent further modifications and served as the official residence of the Venetian governor, known as the Palazzo del Governo. It remained an important administrative center throughout Venetian rule.

It was also during the Venetian period, in 1550, that a Venetian column was transported to the square and erected with a Lion of Saint Mark placed on its top to symbolize Venetian dominance. Previously there were raspberry trees on this spot before the palace.

In 1570, as Nicosia fell during the Ottoman conquest of Cyprus, the palace was a stronghold for the final pockets of Venetian resistance. The Governor and his men initially refused to surrender but ultimately complied after a demand by the Ottoman commander, Lala Mustafa Pasha. Despite their surrender, the Venetian governor and other members of the city elite were massacred.

=== Ottoman period ===
Under Ottoman rule, the palace became the residence of the island's governors. It remained a symbol of authority but also of unrest. On 5 November 1764 enraged Cypriots stormed the building and killed Governor Çil Osman Ağa along with 18 of his men, in protest against oppressive taxes.

=== British era ===
With the island coming under British administration in 1878, the palace continued to serve as an official building and housed part of the administration. Despite plans to restore it, the structure was deemed too fragile and dilapidated. In 1904, it was demolished, and the current Nicosia Law Courts were constructed on its site.

=== Legacy ===
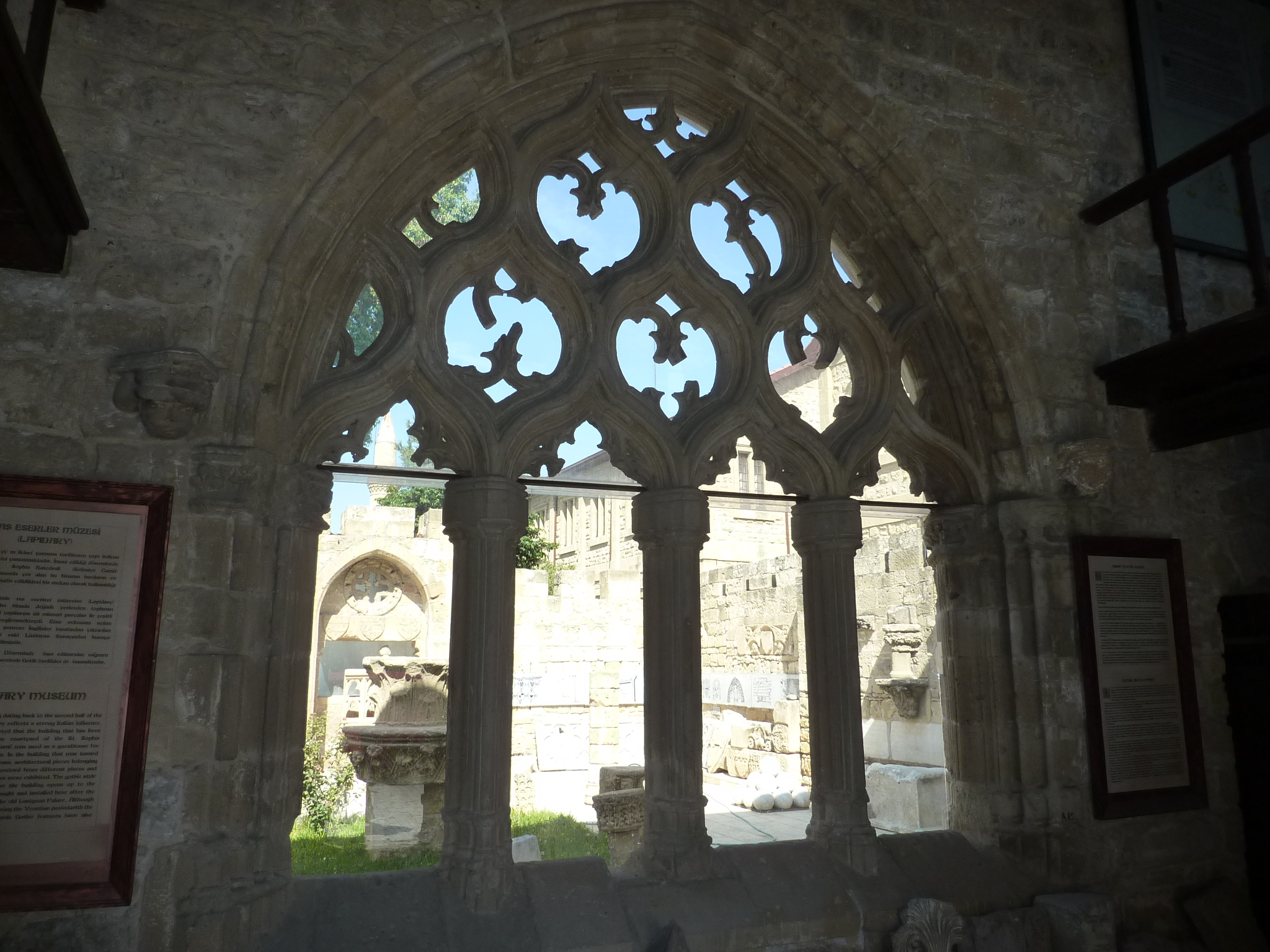
The remaining window of the Lusignan palace at the Lapidary museum in Nicosia

Today, no visible trace of the Lusignan Palace remains in Sarayönü Square. However, a surviving Gothic window from the gate tower of the palace is preserved in the Lapidary Museum in Nicosia.

== 19th century description of the Lusignan palace by Basil Stewart ==
A description of the palace and its surroundings can be found in My experiences of Cyprus; being an account of the people, mediæval cities and castles, antiquities and history of the island of Cyprus: to which is added a chapter on the present economic and political problems which affect the island as a dependency of the British empire written by Basil Stewart in 1880.

"One of the most interesting remains of old Nicosia is the Court of the Seraglio or Lusignan Palace. It is a large, open courtyard, surrounded with an arcade of pointed arches, carried on rather short, square pillars, carrying a balcony above, with a well in the centre. There was, till a few years ago, an entrance gate, over which was a square room, which had a beautiful flamboyant window facing the courtyard. This was pulled down as unsafe. The whole seraglio is now in a very dilapidated, tumbledown condition."

== Literature ==
- Keshishian, Kevork K. (1978). Nicosia: Capital of Cyprus Then and Now (2nd ed.). Nicosia: The Moufflon Book and Art Centre. p. 60.
