= Law Courts, Nicosia =

Historical building in Nicosia, Cyprus

Law Courts building
- Mahkemeler Binası
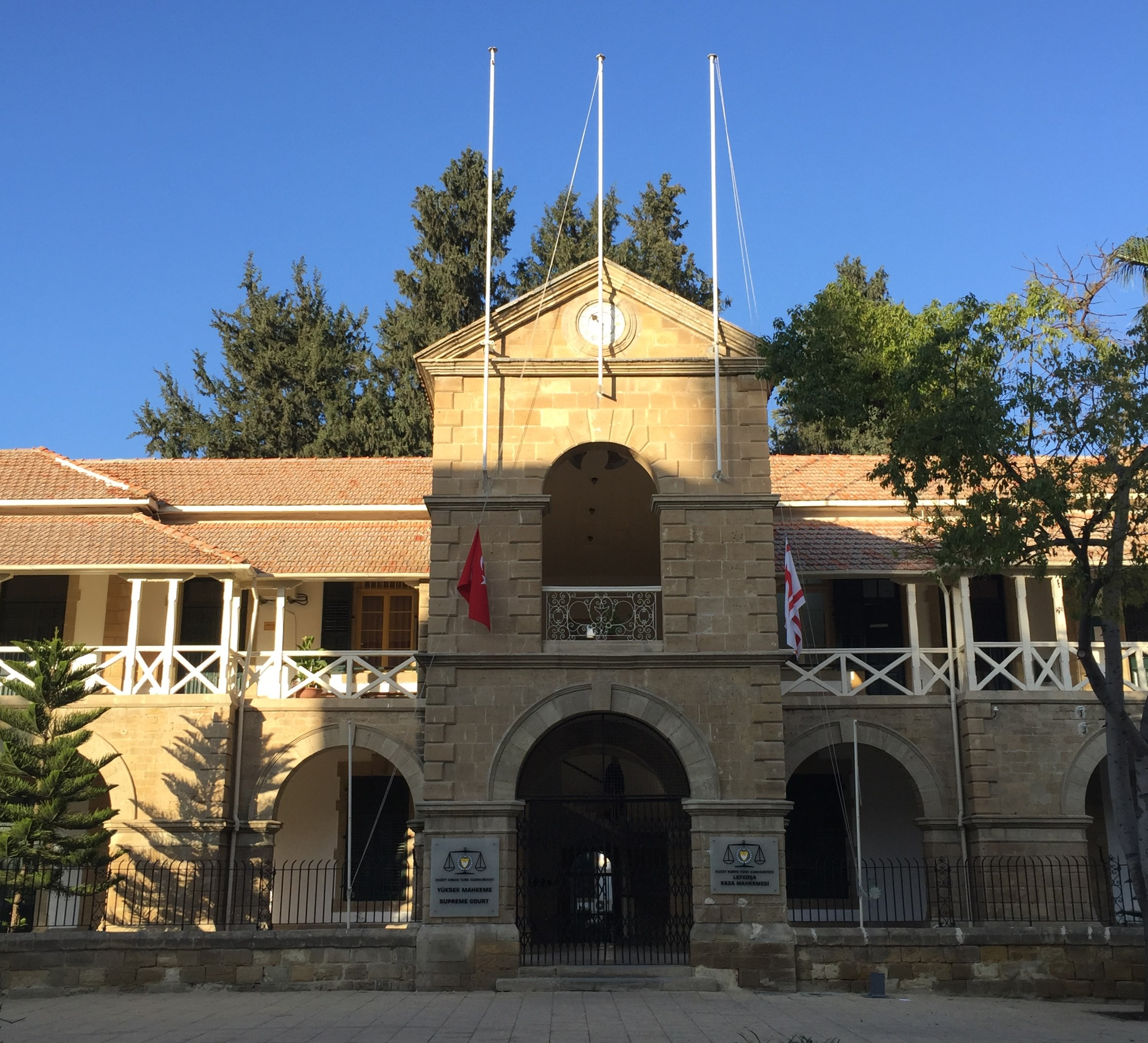
- The front façade and main entrance of the building

General information
- Location: Sarayönü Square, North Nicosia, Northern Cyprus
- Coordinates: 35°10′43″N 33°21′36″E
- Current tenants: Turkish Cypriot law courts
- Groundbreaking: 14 June 1900
- Completed: 1904
- Renovated: 1998-2009

Technical details
- Floor count: 2

Design and construction
- Architect: Charles Bellamy

The Law Courts building is a historic building in Nicosia, Cyprus, currently located in North Nicosia. It is located on the central Sarayönü Square.

== History ==
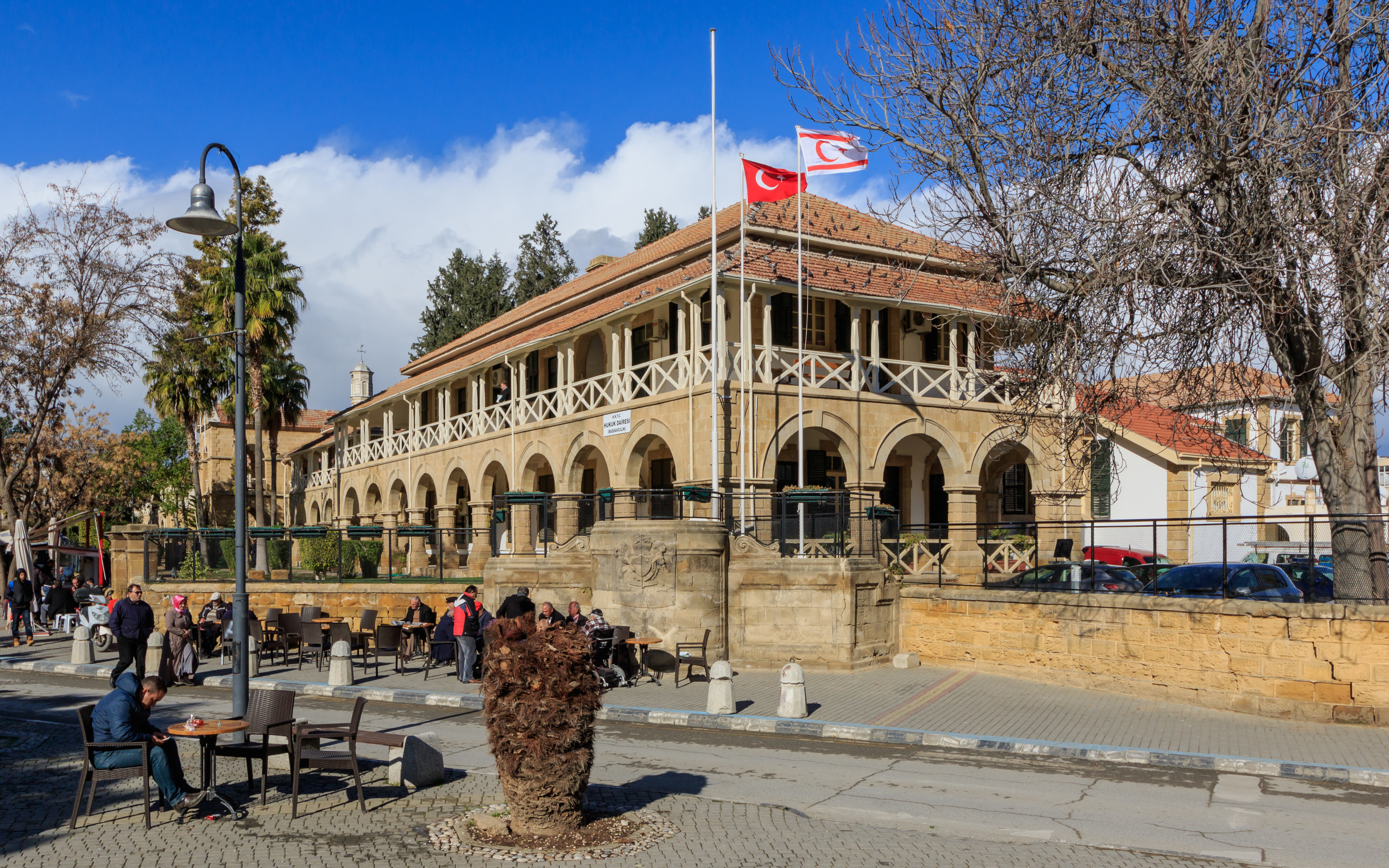
The corner of the building facing the Sarayönü Square, with the British royal coat of arms visible on the surrounding wall

The site of the building was historically occupied by the Lusignan Palace, the former residence of the Frankish kings of Cyprus in the Middle Ages. The British colonial administration considered this building too weak and ruinous and decided to demolish it. The historical gate of the palace wanted to be kept, but it was technically impossible to do so and the gate was moved to the present-day Lapidary Museum. Thus, plans made by Frank Cartwright, George Jeffery and William Williams in 1896 that kept the gate were discarded. The present-day law courts building was designed in 1899 by Charles Bellamy, the Director of Public Works. The construction began on 14 June 1900 and was completed in 1904, when the law courts, postal service, land registry office and police moved in. However, by the 1920s, the building was too small for the needs of the administration and new blocks were added to the east and west of the central building. The building was renovated, part by part, between 1998 and 2009.

== Architecture ==
The building is in the Neoclassical architectural style. The central building is rectangular and built of yellow stone (ashlar). The entrance gate is a tower that protrudes from the front façade of the building, with semicircular arches on its three sides. The other façades are characterized by two-story colonnades and rooms located behind these.
