= Sarayönü Square =

Square in North Nicosia

Sarayönü
- Atatürk Square
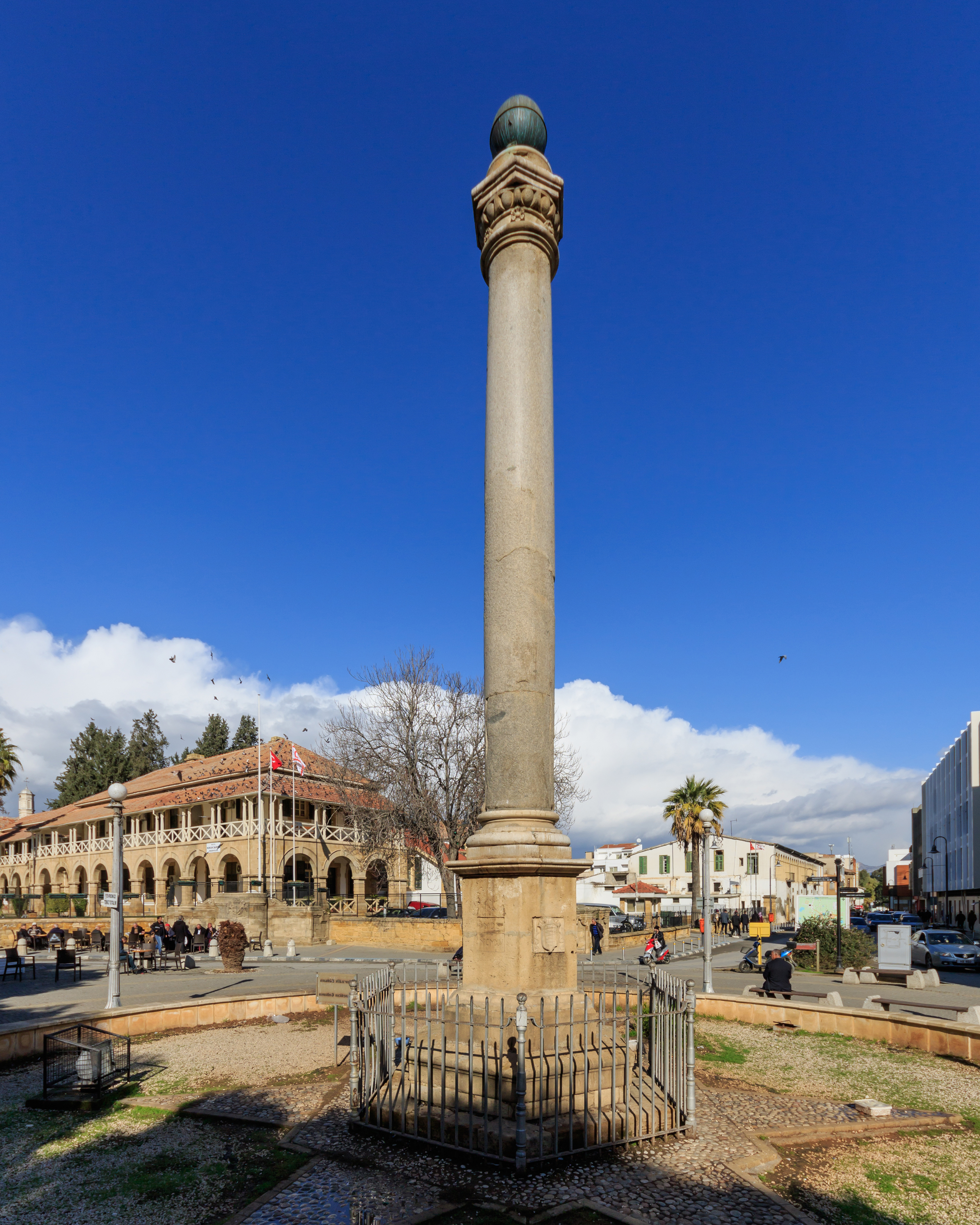
- The Venetian Column, located in the Sarayönü Square.
- Interactive map of Sarayönü
- Former names: Konak Square; Saray Square; Orduönü Square
- Maintained by: Nicosia Turkish Municipality
- Location: North Nicosia, Northern Cyprus (de facto); Nicosia, Cyprus (de jure)
- Coordinates: 35.17812°N 33.360891°E

Other
- Known for: Center of North Nicosia, historical administrative center

Sarayönü (Greek: Πλατεία του Σεραγίου), officially Atatürk Square (Turkish: Atatürk Meydanı; Greek: Πλατεία Ατατούρκ), is a square in North Nicosia. It is the centre of the Turkish part of the city and was the administrative center of the island for centuries.

The Turkish Cypriot central Law Courts, the Nicosia Post Office, as well as a police station and a number of banks are in the square. The thoroughfare of Girne Avenue ends in the square. The Ottoman governor's mansion, originally a Lusignan, and later Venetian palace, also stood in the south west of the square, before it was destroyed by the British in early 20th century.

== Name ==
The name "Sarayönü", meaning "the front of the palace", has been commonly used for a long time. The square was reportedly known as "Orduönü Square" before the 18th century. Giovanni Mariti wrote in 1767 that the square was called "Saray Square" by the local population. The first British administrative mentions the square as "Serai Eunu Meidanlik" ("Sarayönü Meydanlığı", Sarayönü Square) and "Hioukioumet Konaghi Meidani" ("Hükümet Konağı Meydanı", Government House Square). The name was then switched to "Konak Square" ("Mansion Square") prior to the last years of British rule on the island.

The square was officially renamed "Atatürk Square" after Turkish statesman Mustafa Kemal Atatürk in 1943 by the Nicosia Municipality under Themistoklis Dervis. According to the contemporary Turkish Cypriot newspaper Söz, the change was greeted with appreciation by the Turkish Cypriot community and helped Dervis boost his popularity prior to the upcoming elections.

== History ==
=== Lusignan and Venetian era ===
A defining feature of the square was the royal palace constructed by the Lusignan dynasty until its demolition. It was originally constructed as the house of Sir Hugh de la Baume, the Constable of Cyprus, but the royal family moved into the house following the burning of their second royal palace by the Mamluks. The move occurred in 1427 after some alterations and the building became the third Lusignan royal palace in Nicosia. The place where the Venetian Column stands today was occupied by raspberry trees when the Lusignan palace was constructed.

When the Republic of Venice captured Cyprus in 1489, the palace was modified and used as the mansion of the governor. It was called "Palazzo del Governo" by the Venetians. It was during the Venetian period, in 1550, that the Venetian Column was transported to the square and erected with a Lion of Saint Mark placed on its top to symbolize Venetian dominance. It was also reported that the square was home to a Carmelite church during this period.

=== Ottoman era ===
In 1570, following the fall of Nicosia during the Ottoman conquest of Cyprus, a last pocket of resistance continued in the palace, as the Governor and his men kept fighting. The Ottoman commander, Lala Mustafa Pasha, called for the surrender of the palace, which the Venetians complied with. This was followed by the killing of the Venetian governor and other members of the city elite. On 5 November 1764, another bloody incident happened in the square as the people of Cyprus attacked the palace to kill the governor Çil Osman Ağa and his 18 men for the higher taxes that they demanded.

Ottoman rule saw several developments in the square. The palace was modified again and kept being used as the governor's mansion. Information regarding the structure of the building at this time has been retrieved from contemporary land title archives and the accounts of A.L. Salvator, who visited the city in 1873. The mansion had two floors and a rectangular shape. After the gates, an arched gateway led to a yard surrounded by porticoes, where a well and a large tree used for executions could be found. On the upper floor, some rooms were reserved for the personal use of the governor, while some were used as his offices. The ground floor was used as further offices, a barn and the central prison. The palace extended to cover almost the half of the present-day square, while the Venetian Column was located at the yard of the Sarayönü Mosque, with a raspberry tree at its modern-day place.

The old Latin Carmelite church was converted into the Sarayönü Mosque, also known as the Orduönü Masjid (Turkish: Orduönü Mescidi). Its exterior displayed arched Gothic architecture, while its interior reflected classical Ottoman architecture. The Sarayönü madrasa, a cemetery, a bazaar, law courts, a fountain, coffeehouses, an arsenal, a military hospital, coffeehouses, a hamam (bathhouse) and the Ottoman qadi's residence were built during the Ottoman period in the square. However, as the city's population grew, the military facilities were relocated outside the city and houses with classical Ottoman architecture, featuring bay windows were built.

== Features ==
=== Venetian Column ===
The Venetian Column, which was transported from the ruins of Salamis, stands in the square. The column is made of granite and it is believed to have been aquarried from the temple of Zeus at Salamis. It was brought to Nicosia from Salamis in 1550 and was stored in the grounds of the "Sarayönü Mosque". It was placed in its current place in 1915 and then decorated with an engraving at its base of the date it was brought to Nicosia and the date it was erected (1550 and 1915). In the north of the square, there is a fountain built during Ottoman rule.

=== Fountain ===
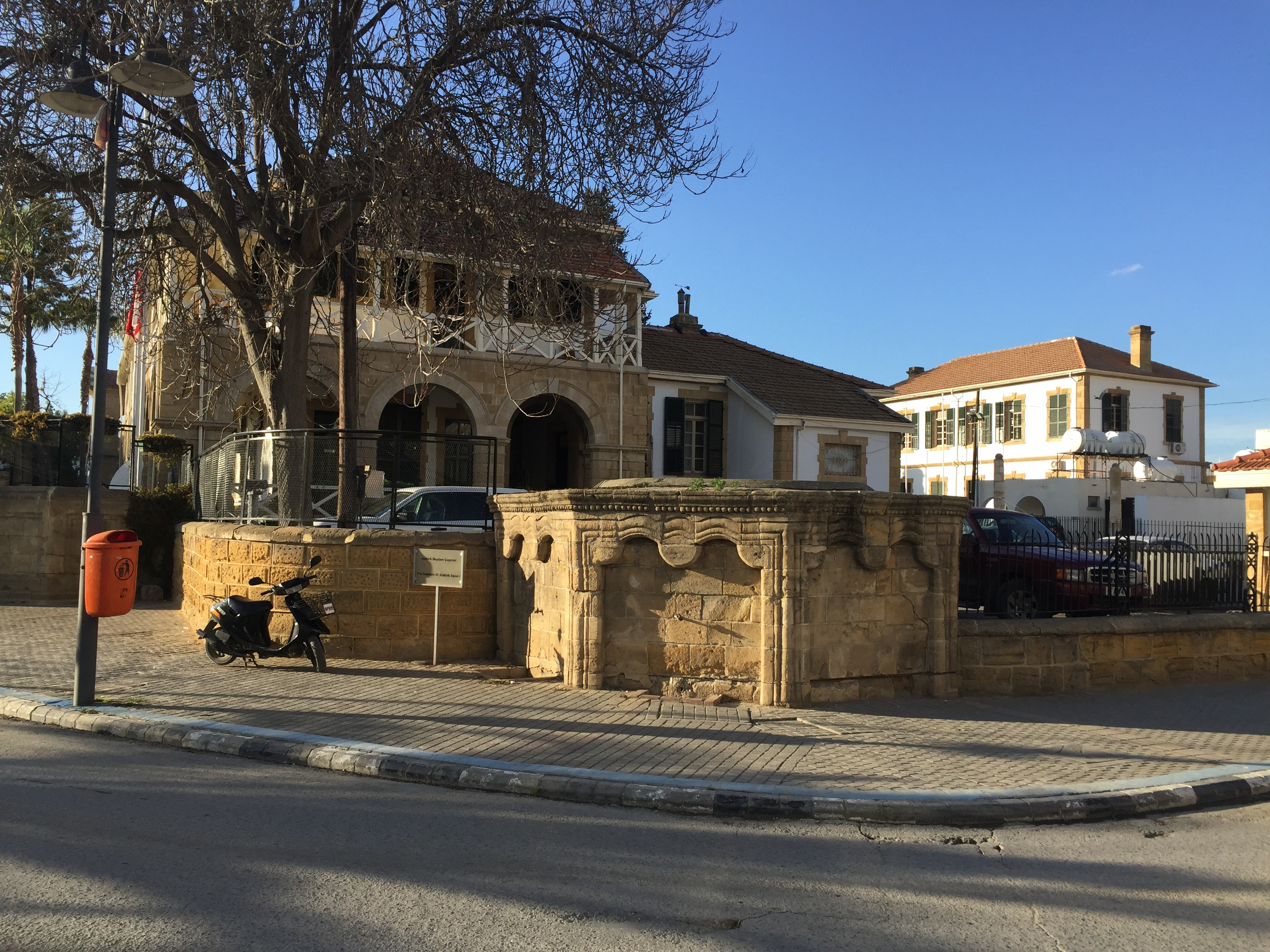
The fountain at Sarayönü Square

The fountain at the square, which stands at the corner of the Law Courts, was built in the Ottoman period. Giovanni Mariti wrote of the fountain's existence in the 1760s, stating that it was well-supplied with water. The fountain was once supplied with water from the Arab Ahmet water source, but has not been functional for a long time. The fountain has an octagonal plan and has one fountain on every side, within niches. The fountain was covered by a frame supported by columns until the 1950s, but this frame was removed at that time. In 1976, the fountain was restored by the Turkish Cypriot Department of Antiquities.
