= Lobby for Cyprus =

Lobby for Cyprus is a non-party-political human rights NGO that is based in London in the United Kingdom. Lobby for Cyprus campaigns for the reunification of Cyprus and for the human rights of Cypriots.

== See also ==
- Loizidou v. Turkey
- Greek Cypriots, et al. v. TRNC and HSBC Bank USA
- Eleni Foka
- Titina Loizidou
- Human rights in Northern Cyprus
