= Right of return =

Principle in international law

The right of return is a principle in international law which guarantees peoples' right of return to, or re-entry to, their country of citizenship. The right of return is part of the broader human rights concept of freedom of movement and is also related to the legal concept of nationality. While many states afford their citizens the right of abode, the right of return is not restricted to citizenship or nationality in the formal sense. It allows stateless persons and for those born outside their country to return for the first time, so long as they have maintained—subject to the legal concept of laches—a "genuine and effective link". (Note: A lack of this maintenance would be "rare for those who have personally fled [from a given country]".)

The right is formulated in several modern treaties and conventions, most notably in the 1948 Universal Declaration of Human Rights, the 1966 International Covenant on Civil and Political Rights and the 1948 Fourth Geneva Convention. Legal scholars have argued that one or more of these international human rights instruments have attained the status of customary international law and that the right of return is therefore binding on non-signatories to these conventions.

The right of return is often invoked by representatives of refugee groups to assert that they have a right to return to the country from which they were displaced.

== History ==
The right to leave any country and to return to one's own country are regarded as human rights and are founded on natural law.

=== Ancient precedents ===
While the right of return was not explicitly recognized in antiquity, exile, being explicitly refused permission to return home, was a common punishment for severe crimes. The topic was discussed extensively by antique writers. For example, Teles of Megara in his diatribe On Exile wrote "But exiles are not allowed to return home, and this is a severe restriction of their freedom."

During antiquity, groups of people were frequently deported or uprooted from their cities and homeland, often as part of conquest or as a punishment for rebellion. In some cases they were allowed or encouraged to return, typically after the balance of military and political forces had changed.

A well-known example is the return to Zion, by which King Cyrus the Great granted the Jews expelled from Judah to Babylon the option to return to their ancestral homeland and rebuild Jerusalem. Recorded in the Hebrew Bible (Book of Ezra and Book of Nehemiah) this case is often cited as a precedent by modern Zionists and also inspired other groups seeking to pursue their own return.

During the Peloponnesian War, Athens expelled and scattered the inhabitants of Melos, Aegina and other cities (some of them being sold into slavery). Following the victory of Sparta, the Spartan general Lysander in 405 BC made a concerted effort to gather these exiles and restore them to their original cities.

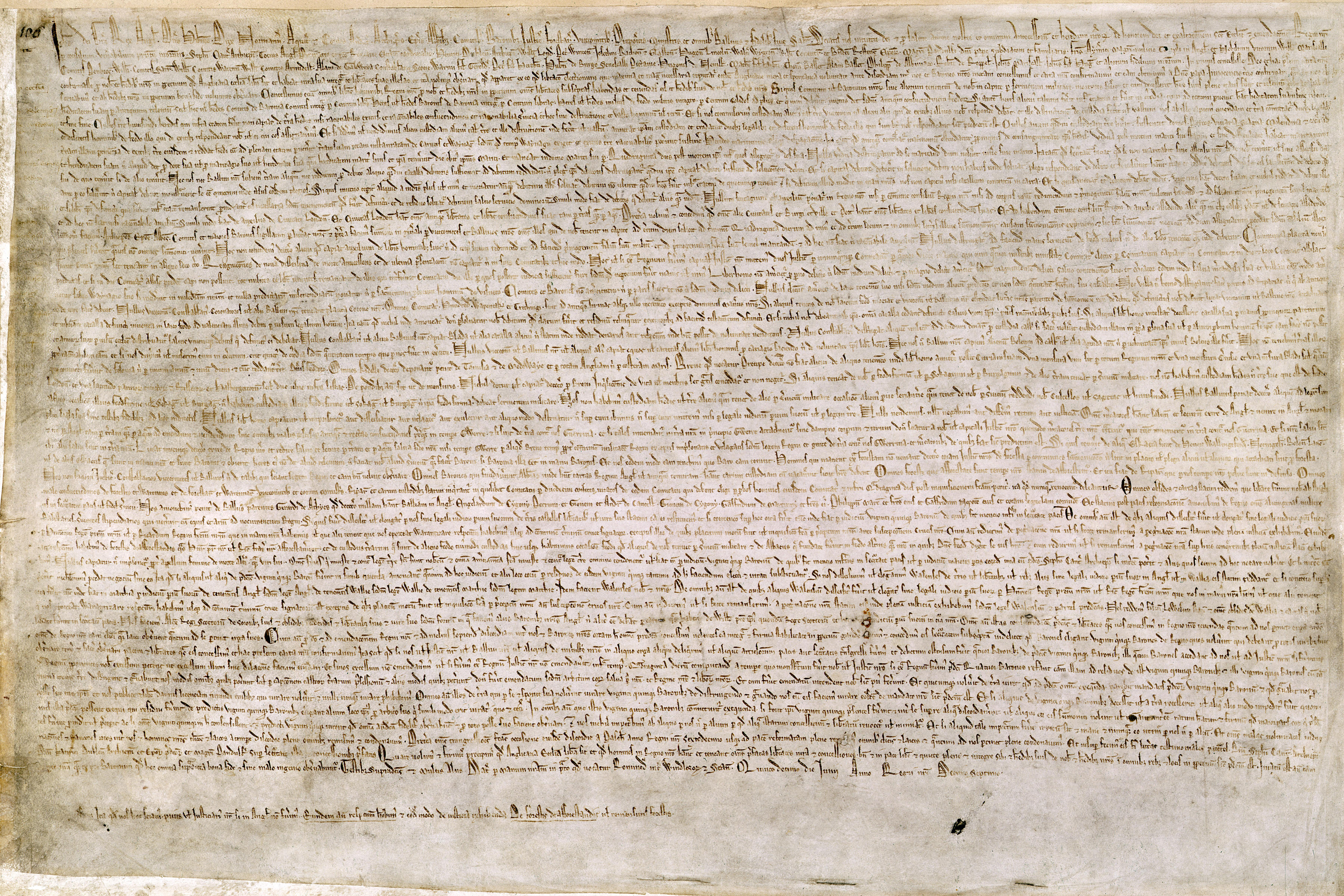
Cotton MS. Augustus II. 106, one of only four surviving exemplifications of the 1215 text

=== Magna Carta ===
The first codified law guaranteeing a right of return can be found in the English charter Magna Carta from 1215:

In future it shall be lawful for any man to leave and return to our kingdom unharmed and without fear, by land or water, preserving his allegiance to us, except in time of war, for some short period, for the common benefit of the realm. People that have been imprisoned or outlawed in accordance with the law of the land, people from a country that is at war with us, and merchants – who shall be dealt with as stated above – are excepted from this provision.

=== French Constitution of 1791 ===
Another early example of national law recognizing the Right of Return was the French constitution of 1791, enacted on 15 December 1790:

the freedom of everyone to go, to stay, or to leave, without being halted or arrested unless in accordance with procedures established by the Constitution.

The constitution put an end to the centuries-long persecution and discrimination of Huguenots (French Protestants).

Concurrently with making all Protestants resident in France into full-fledged citizens, the law enacted on December 15, 1790 stated that:

All persons born in a foreign country and descending in any degree of a French man or woman expatriated for religious reason are declared French nationals (naturels français) and will benefit to rights attached to that quality if they come back to France, establish their domicile there and take the civic oath.

The revocation of the Edict of Nantes and expulsion of the Huguenots had taken place more than a century earlier, and there were numerous Huguenot emigrants to other countries, where they often intermarried with the population of the host country (see Edict of Potsdam). Therefore, the law potentially conferred French citizenship on numerous Britons, Germans, South Africans and others – though only a fraction actually took advantage of it. This option for Huguenot descendants to gain French citizenship remained open until 1945, when it was abolished – since after the occupation of France, the French were unwilling to let Germans of Huguenot origin take advantage of it.

=== Schleswig plebiscites, 1920 ===
In the aftermath of the Second Schleswig War of 1864, the previously Danish-ruled territory of Schleswig became part of Imperial Germany. A significant number of inhabitants, known as "optants", chose to retain their Danish citizenship and refused to take up a German one. Consequently, they were expelled from the area by Prussian authorities. Half a century later, following the German defeat in the First World War, a plebiscite was held in 1920 to determine the future of the area. The Danish government asked the Allied Powers to let these expelled ethnic Danes and their descendants return to Schleswig and take part in the plebiscite. This was granted, though many of the optants had in the meantime emigrated to the United States, and most of these did not actually come back.

== Legal understanding of the right ==
The right of return principle has been codified in a number of international instruments, including:

Hague Regulations (HR), article 20:

20. After the conclusion of peace, the repatriation of prisoners of war shall be carried out as quickly as possible.

It has been argued that if the HR require the repatriation of prisoners, then it is "obvious" that civilians displaced during conflict must also be allowed to repatriate.

Universal Declaration of Human Rights (UDHR), article 13:

1. Everyone has the right to freedom of movement and residence within the borders of each State.
2. Everyone has the right to leave any country, including his own, and to return to his country.

International Covenant on Civil and Political Rights (ICCPR) article 12(4):

4. No one shall be arbitrarily deprived of the right to enter his own country.

Fourth Geneva Convention, article 49:

49. Individual or mass forcible transfers, as well as deportations of protected persons from occupied territory to the territory of the Occupying Power or to that of any other country, occupied or not, are prohibited, regardless of their motive.
  Nevertheless, the Occupying Power may undertake total or partial evacuation of a given area if the security of the population or imperative military reasons so demand. ... Persons thus evacuated shall be transferred back to their homes as soon as hostilities in the area in question have ceased.

Convention on the Elimination of All Forms of Racial Discrimination, article 5d(ii):

The right to leave any country, including one's own, and to return to one's country.

Some controversy exists among scholars on how these articles should be interpreted.

=== "His own country" ===
The landmark International Court of Justice case the Nottebohm case of 1955 is often cited as staking out more criteria as to what "one's country" should be. The court ruled that there needed to be a "genuine and effective" link between the individual and the country. Among the criteria listed for such a link were "a close and enduring connection", "tradition", "establishment", "interests" and "family ties". The 1955 ruling has been supplanted by more recent conventions and court rulings.

There is some disagreement as to what "his own" and "his country" means in the ICCPR and UDHR. According to the United Nations Human Rights Committee's authoritative interpretation from 1999:

The scope of "his own country" is broader than the concept "country of his nationality". It is not limited to nationality in a formal sense, that is, nationality acquired at birth or by conferral; it embraces, at the very least, an individual who, because of his or her special ties to or claims in relation to a given country, cannot be considered to be a mere alien. This would be the case, for example, of nationals of a country who have been stripped of their nationality in violation of international law, and of individuals whose country of nationality has been incorporated in or transferred to another national entity, whose nationality is being denied them. The right of a person to enter his or her own country recognizes the special relationship of a person to that country ... It includes not only the right to return after having left one's own country; it may also entitle a person to come to the country for the first time if he or she was born outside the country.

According to Agterhuis, the record of negotiations - the travaux préparatoires - of the ICCPR reveals that the wording of article 12(4) was changed from "the right to return to one's country" to "the right to enter one's country" was made in order to include nationals or citizens born outside the country and who have never lived therein.

=== Mass displacement ===
Some disagreement exists on whether the right of return is applicable to situations in which whole ethnic groups have been forcibly displaced. Ruth Lapidoth from the Jerusalem Center for Public Affairs has argued, by citing Stig Jägerskiöld from his 1966 commentary of ICCPR, that the right was not intended to protect groups of displaced people:

... [it] is intended to apply to individuals asserting an individual right. There was no intention here to address the claims of masses of people who have been displaced as a by-product of war or by political transfers of territory or population, such as the relocation of ethnic Germans from Eastern Europe during and after the Second World War, the flight of the Palestinians from what became Israel, or the movement of Jews from the Arab countries.

Hurst Hannum has made a similar argument:

There is no evidence that mass movements of groups such as refugees or displaced persons were to be intended to be included within the scope of article 12 of the Covenant by its drafters.

Austrian human rights lawyer Manfred Nowak has argued the opposite position, that the right of return applies "even if masses of people are claiming this right". Bracka has argued similarly:

At any rate, what seems clear is that neither the text nor the travaux préparatoires of the relevant UDHR, ICCPR and CERD provisions actually support circumscribing [the right of] return in this way [to exclude situations of mass displacement]. Firstly, there is no indication that the drafters considered the applicability of the freedom of movement principle to members of displaced populations. And although it may have been assumed at the time that such a scenario would receive discussion in "some other body of law", this is not synonymous with an intention to limit these articles to isolated individuals. Secondly, nowhere in the actual text is the operation of the right of return qualified on the basis of group affiliation. Rather, in each instance, the relevant language refers to "everyone". In addition, the HRC in General Comment 27 affirms this reading in so far as it states: "[t]he right to return is of the utmost importance for refugees seeking voluntary repatriation. It also implies prohibition of enforced population transfers or mass expulsions to other countries". Thirdly, whilst the right of return in art 12(4) of the ICCPR is presented as an individual right, Quigley confirms that "this is also true of most rights in international human rights instruments". Indeed, the movement of people has historically taken on a collective dimension. Accordingly, to deny the availability of human rights simply because individuals form part of a mass group would render those rights illusory.

Eric Rosand, legal advisor to the US State Department, used the same argument:

Although political negotiations and the issue of self-determination may be appropriate in situations involving mass displacement, nothing in the text or travaux préparatoires of the relevant provisions of the UDHR, ICCPR, or ICERD limits the application of the right of return to individual instances of refusals to repatriate. In fact, based on a close review of these documents, one could conclude that the drafters did not intend to except mass movements of refugees and displaced persons from this right, particularly since the UDHR, the ICCPR, and the ICERD do not indicate that the right to return should be linked to one's group status. In each instance, the relevant language refers to "everyone" having a right to return.

Rosand discusses the views of scholars who do not consider the right of return to be applicable under mass displacement but concludes:

In the final decade of this century, however, the world now condemns such population transfers, which, along with mass expulsions, are deemed to violate important principles of international law. ... Moreover, the right to return in both the UDHR and the ICCPR was the basis for guaranteeing this right in recently signed peace agreements in order to resolve conflicts in Rwanda and Georgia, both of which produced hundreds of thousands of refugees and displaced persons. ... Although the actual return of these groups may, in the end, be determined by political feasibility, this should not prevent the international community from grounding their return in international law. ... In short, there is a difference between acknowledging that a right to return exists although in certain instances it may not be implementable due to the unresolved political situation and declaring that the issue of the return of large groups is beyond the scope of international law and resolvable only as part of ongoing political negotiations.

=== Resettled refugees ===
According to Masri, refugee status is independent of right of return. Thus, refugees who acquire new nationalities in their host countries do not necessarily lose their right to return to the countries they left. Masri argues that the resettlement "weakens the link" between the refugee and the source country but that this weakening is not enough to automatically lead to the deprivation of rights.

=== Regional treaties ===
The right of return is also found in many regional treaties, such as article 12(2) of the African Charter on Human and Peoples' Rights:

Every individual shall have the right to leave any country including his own, and to return to his country. This right may only be subject to restrictions, provided for by law for the protection of national security, law and order, public health or morality.

The right is also found in article 3(2) of the European Convention on Human Rights; "[n]o one shall be deprived of the right to enter the territory of the state of which he is a national" and article 22(5) of the American Convention on Human Rights: "[n]o one can be expelled from the territory of the state of which he is a national or be deprived of the right to enter it." In these conventions the word "national" is used which is considered narrower than "his own country" in article 12(4) of the ICCPR.

== Right of return in case law ==
Few cases have dealt with the right of return principle. In 1996, the European Court of Human Rights (ECHR) ruled in a landmark case known as Loizidou v Turkey. Mrs Titina Loizidou was a Greek-Cypriot refugee displaced from Northern Cyprus and prevented from returning by Turkey. The court ruled that Turkey had violated Mrs Loizidou's human rights, that she should be allowed to return to her home and that Turkey should pay damages to her.

In a similar case, petitioners for the Chagossians asked the ECHR in 2005 to rule about their removal from Diego Garcia by the British government in the 1960s. The court ruled in 2012 that their case was inadmissible and that by accepting compensation, the islanders had forfeited their claim:

The Court notably found that the heart of the applicants' claims under the European Convention on Human Rights was the callous and shameful treatment which they or their antecedents had suffered during their removal from the Chagos islands. These claims had, however, been raised in the domestic courts and settled, definitively. In accepting and receiving compensation, the applicants had effectively renounced bringing any further claims to determine whether the expulsion and exclusion from their homes had been unlawful and breached their rights and they therefore could no longer claim to be victims of a violation of the Convention.

== Non-state groups claiming a right of return ==
=== Armenians from Nagorno-Karabakh (Artsakh) ===
Up until Azerbaijan's military offensive in Nagorno-Karabakh, ethnic Armenians comprised the overwhelming majority of the region. The Azerbaijani government imposed a 10-month-long military siege and offensive, resulting in the dissolution of the Republic of Artsakh, the flight of the entire population, and the incorporation of the territory into Azerbaijan. The Azerbaijani government has denied the right of return to former ethnic Armenians who have fled. Multiple human rights observers, and government officials, including from the United Nations, ICJ, Switzerland, Canada, and the European Parliament, have called on Azerbaijan to ensure the rights of ethnic Armenian residents to return safely to their homeland. Amnesty International stated that "the right [of ethnic Armenians] to remain in their own homes and other rights should not be made conditional on accepting Azerbaijani citizenship."

The Armenian refugees from Nagorno-Karabakh have petitioned for the principle of return as a legal entitlement. The government of Artsakh remains a government-in-exile. Samvel Shahramanyan, former and final president of Nagorno-Karabakh stated "Our right to return to our birthplace, our homeland, is not up for denial." However, the state-sponsored anti-Armenian sentiment within Azerbaijan complicates the possible return of Azerbaijan's ethnic Armenian population. The few Armenians which remain in Azerbaijan live in virtual hiding. Talin and Devedjian state that such an atmosphere "makes the safe, dignified return of Nagorno-Karabakh Armenians virtually impossible." The scholars emphasize that Azeri President Ilham Aliyev has publicly fostered antagonism against Armenians through gestures, including stepping on the Nagorno-Karabakh flag and overseeing the demolition of the parliamentary building of Nagorno-Karabakh.

Gegham Stepanyan, former Human Rights Defender of Artsakh, states, "The right of return is not some fairy tale; it is a right that is enshrined and must be protected." Critics have characterized the destruction of Armenian heritage sites in Nagorno-Karabakh as cultural genocide, or cultural erasure. According to Lori Khatchadourian, a professor and co-founder of Caucasus Heritage Watch, the erasure of Armenian heritage in the Azerbaijani-controlled exclave of Nakhchivan is an example of what may occur in Nagorno-Karabakh. The Aram Manoukian Institute states "the return of ethnic Armenians back to their homeland without preserving their cultural and religious presence (monuments, buildings, churches, and monasteries) will question the very existence of Armenian history on these territories."

=== Circassians ===
Circassians are an indigenous ethnic group originating from the northwestern Caucasus. Throughout the 19th century, the Russian Empire adopted a policy to eradicate Circassians from their ancestral homelands, pushing most surviving Circassians into the diaspora. Many Circassians have expressed an interest in returning to Circassia, particularly Circassians fleeing the conflict in Syria.

=== Georgian refugees and internally displaced people ===
During Abkhazia's war of secession in 1992–1993 and the second Abkhazia war in 1998, 200,000–250,000 Georgian civilians became internally displaced people (IDPs) and refugees. Abkhazia, while formally agreeing to repatriation, has hindered the return of refugees both officially and unofficially for more than fifteen years.

=== Greek-Cypriots ===
During the Turkish invasion of Cyprus, 40% of the Greek-Cypriot population as well as over half of the Turkish-Cypriot population of the island were displaced. The island was divided along ethnic lines and most of the Greek-Cypriot displaced people were not allowed to return to their homes in the northern Turkish-Cypriot side and vice versa.

Plans for a solution of the conflict has centered around bilateral agreements of population exchange, such as the Third Vienna Agreement reached in 1975 or the proposed Annan Plan of 2004. In these plans, the right of return was to be severely limited with respect to Greek-Cypriot internally displaced people/refugees to districts such as Kyrenia, Morphou, Famagusta, and parts of Nicosia, despite judgements of the European Court of Human Rights in cases such as Loizidou v. Turkey, and numerous UN resolutions recognizing the right of return (such as SC 361 and GA 3212). Two referendums on the Annan Plan were held in April 2004, separately along ethnic lines. The Annan Plan was overwhelmingly rejected in the Greek-Cypriot referendum.

The right of return continues to remain a stumbling block to the settlement of the Cyprus problem.

=== Diego Garcia Chagossians ===
The Chagossians, an ethnic group residing on the island of Diego Garcia in the Indian Ocean, were expelled to Mauritius in the 1960s, in connection with the erection of an U.S. Military strategic military installation on the island. Ever since, the Chagossians have been conducting a persistent political and legal struggle to return to Diego Garcia. As of 2007, their right to return was recognised by several British courts but the UK government had failed to implement it.

=== Palestinians ===
State succession arises when there is a definitive replacement of one state by another in respect of sovereignty over a given political territory, in conformity with international law. Experts argue that, under those principles, Palestinian citizens who fled or were expelled from the areas that became Israel automatically acquired Israeli nationality with the creation of the state in 1948. Consequently, these individuals, based on their de jure nationality, could claim a right to return.

== Countries with laws conferring a right of return ==
=== Abkhazia (self-declared) ===
The law on the repatriation of self-declared Republic of Abkhazia gives the right of return to the ethnic Abkhaz and Abazins who are the descendants of the refugees who left Abkhazia due to the 19th-century genocide. The State Repatriation Committee provides support to the repatriates.

=== Armenia ===
Article 14 of the Constitution of Armenia (1995) provides that "[i]ndividuals of Armenian origin shall acquire citizenship of the Republic of Armenia through a simplified procedure." This provision is consistent with the Declaration on Independence of Armenia, issued by the Supreme Soviet of the Republic of Armenia in 1989, which declared at article 4 that "Armenians living abroad are entitled to the citizenship of the Republic of Armenia".

=== Austria ===
Under Section 58c of the Austrian Citizenship Act (German: Staatsbürgerschaftsgesetz), Austrians and their descendants who were persecuted or feared persecution by Nazi Germany can become Austrian citizens. While Austria does not allow dual citizenship in most circumstances, people who receive citizenship under § 58c may keep their previous citizenship. However, if they later receive another country's citizenship, they must renounce their Austrian citizenship and may not re-apply. Alternatively, they can apply for a permit for the retention of Austrian citizenship if they wish to receive another citizenship after claiming Austrian citizenship.

=== Finland ===
People of Finnish origin may receive citizenship by declaration, which is faster and cheaper than naturalization and has fewer requirements. People of Finnish origin can be: 1) children, born abroad, of a Finnish father; 2) 12–17-year-old adopted children; 3) former Finnish citizens; 4) citizens of another Nordic country; 5) 18-22-year-olds with a long residency in Finland.

Between 1990 and 2016, Finland also accepted returnees with a Soviet passport (or post-Soviet passport) where the ethnicity was marked as Finnish. This allowed the immigration of Ingrian Finns and other Finns who had remained in the Soviet Union. People who served in the Finnish Defence Forces or Finnish people evacuated by German or Finnish authorities from occupied areas to Finland during World War II also qualified as returnees. However, these options are no longer available, and applicants must qualify for ordinary naturalization instead.

=== France ===
Another early example of national law recognizing the Right of Return was the French constitution of 1791, enacted on 15 December 1790:

the freedom of everyone to go, to stay, or to leave, without being halted or arrested unless in accordance with procedures established by the Constitution.

The constitution put an end to the centuries-long persecution and discrimination of Huguenots (French Protestants).. Concurrently with making all Protestants resident in France into full-fledged citizens, the law enacted on December 15, 1790 stated that:

All persons born in a foreign country and descending in any degree of a French man or woman expatriated for religious reason are declared French nationals (naturels français) and will benefit to rights attached to that quality if they come back to France, establish their domicile there and take the civic oath.

The revocation of the Edict of Nantes and expulsion of the Huguenots had taken place more than a century earlier, and there were extensive Huguenot diasporas in many countries, where they often intermarried with the population of the host country. Therefore, the law potentially conferred French citizenship on numerous Britons, Germans, South Africans and others – though only a fraction actually took advantage of it. This option for Huguenot descendants to gain French citizenship remained open until 1945, when it was abolished - since after the Occupation of France, the French were unwilling to let Germans of Huguenot origin to take advantage of it. In October 1985, French President François Mitterrand issued a public apology to the descendants of Huguenots around the world.

=== Germany ===
German law allows (1) people descending from German nationals of any ethnicity or (2) people of ethnic German descent and living in countries of the former Warsaw Pact (as well as Yugoslavia) the right to "return" to Germany and ("re")claim German citizenship Aussiedler/Spätaussiedler, "late emigrants"). After legislative changes in late 1992 this right is de facto restricted to ethnic Germans from the former Soviet Union. As with many legal implementations of the right of return, the "return" to Germany of individuals who may never have lived in Germany based on their ethnic origin or their descent from German nationals has been controversial.

The law is codified in paragraph 1 of Article 116 of the Basic Law for the Federal Republic of Germany, which provides access to German citizenship for anyone "who has been admitted to the territory of the German Reich within the boundaries of December 31, 1937, as a refugee or expellee of German ethnic origin or as the spouse or descendant of such person". Those territories had a Polish minority, which also had German citizenship and after World War II lived in Poland. These Polish people are also Aussiedler or Spätaussiedler and came especially in the 1980s to Germany, see Emigration from Poland to Germany after World War II. For example Lukas Podolski and Eugen Polanski became German citizens by this law.

Paragraph 2 of Article 116 also provides that "Former German citizens who between 30 January 1933 and 8 May 1945 were deprived of their citizenship on political, racial or religious grounds, and their descendants, shall on application have their citizenship restored". The historic context for Article 116 was the eviction, following World War II, of an estimated 9 million foreign ethnic Germans from other countries in Central and Eastern Europe. Another 9 million German nationals in the former eastern German territories, over which Joseph Stalin and eastern neighbour states extended military hegemony in 1945, were expelled as well. These expellees and refugees, known as Heimatvertriebene, were given refugee status and documents, and—as to foreign ethnic Germans—also West German citizenship (in 1949), and resettled in West Germany.

The discussion of possible compensation continues; this, however, has been countered by possible claims for war compensation from Germany's eastern neighbours, pertaining to both Germany's unconditional surrender and the series of population transfers carried out under the instruments of Potsdam. Between 1950 and 2016 it is estimated that up to 1,445,210 Aussiedler/Spätaussiedler and their family members, including many ethnic Poles according to Deutsche Welle (for example Lukas Podolski and Eugen Polanski), emigrated from Poland.

=== Ghana ===
Ghana allows people with African ancestry to apply for and be granted the right to stay in Ghana indefinitely, known as the Right of Abode.

=== Greece ===
Various phenomena throughout Greek history (the extensive colonization by classical Greek city states, the vast expansion of Greek culture in Hellenistic times, the large dominions at times held by the Greek-speaking Byzantine Empire, and the energetic trading activity by Greeks under the Ottomans) all tended to create Greek communities far beyond the boundaries of modern Greece.

Recognizing this situation, Greece grants citizenship to broad categories of people of ethnic Greek ancestry who are members of the Greek diaspora, including individuals and families whose ancestors have been resident in diaspora communities outside the modern state of Greece for centuries or millennia.

"Foreign persons of Greek origin", who neither live in Greece nor hold Greek citizenship nor were necessarily born there, may become Greek citizens by enlisting in Greece's military forces, under article 4 of the Code of Greek Citizenship, as amended by the Acquisition of Greek Nationality by Aliens of Greek Origin Law (Law 2130/1993). Anyone wishing to do so must present a number of documents, including "[a]vailable written records ... proving the Greek origin of the interested person and his ancestors".

Albania has demanded since the 1940s that Greece grant a right of return to the Muslim Cham Albanians, who were expelled from the Greek region of Epirus between 1944 and 1945, at the end of World War II – a demand firmly rejected by the Greeks (see Cham issue).

=== Hungary ===
In 2010, Hungary passed a law granting citizenship and the right of return to descendants of Hungarians living mostly on the former territory of the Kingdom of Hungary and now residing in Hungary's neighbouring countries. Slovakia, which has 500,000 ethnic Magyar citizens (10% of its population), objected vociferously.

=== Ireland ===
Present Irish nationality law states that any person with a grandparent born on the island of Ireland can claim Irish nationality by enrollment in the Foreign Births Register. Additionally, the law permits the Minister of Justice to waive the residency requirements for naturalization for a person of "Irish descent or Irish associations".

=== Israel ===
The Law of Return is legislation enacted by Israel in 1950 that gives all Jews, people of Jewish ancestry up to at least one Jewish grandparent, and their spouses the right to immigrate to and settle in Israel and obtain citizenship, and obliges the Israeli government to facilitate their immigration. Originally, the law applied to Jews only, until a 1970 amendment stated that the rights "are also vested in a child and a grandchild of a Jew, the spouse of a Jew, the spouse of a child of a Jew and the spouse of a grandchild of a Jew". This resulted in several hundreds of thousands of people fitting the above criteria immigrating to Israel (mainly from the former Soviet Union) but not being recognized as Jews by the Israeli religious authorities, which on the basis of halakha recognize only the child of a Jewish mother as being Jewish, or a proselyte to Judaism. Moreover, some of these immigrants, though having a Jewish grandparent, are known to be practicing Christians. People who would be otherwise eligible for this law can be excluded if they can reasonably be considered to constitute a danger to the welfare of the state, have a criminal past, or are wanted fugitives in their countries (with the exception of persecution victims). Jews who converted to another religion can also be denied the right of return. Since its inception in 1948, over three million Jews have immigrated to Israel.

=== Latvia ===
According to the law passed in 2013, any person who themself or whose parent or grandparent had Latvian or Livonian ethnicity, did not voluntarily choose a different ethnicity and lived on Latvian territory between 1881 and 17 June 1940, may register Latvian citizenship upon providing proofing documents and passing a language exam.

=== Poland ===
From the Constitution of Poland, Article 52(5): "Anyone whose Polish origin has been confirmed in accordance with statute may settle permanently in Poland."

=== Portugal ===
On April 12, 2013, the Portuguese parliament unanimously approved a measure that allows the descendants of Jews expelled from Portugal in the 16th century to become Portuguese citizens.

=== Romania ===
Romanian citizenship can be regained or granted to individuals who were Romanian citizens and who lost it for reasons beyond their control or whose citizenship was revoked involuntarily. This legal provision also applies in the case of descendants of former Romanian citizens up to the third degree.

=== Russia ===
The Russian Federation offers citizenship to individuals descended from Russian ancestors who can demonstrate an affinity for Russian culture and, preferably, speak Russian. Concern about Russia's shrinking population prompted the program. This has had a positive effect because this has not only reversed Russia's population decline but has also increased the birth rate. Officials estimate that 25 million members of the Russian diaspora are eligible for nationality. The Foreign Ministry has sent emissaries to countries around the world to urge the descendants of Russian emigrants to return home. The majority of these emigrants have returned from Ukraine, many of them young men looking for better education and job opportunities.

=== Spain ===
Sephardi Jews were expelled from Spain in 1492. Despite the requirement by general rule for obtaining Spanish nationality after five years of residence in Spain, by royal decree on 20 December 1924, Sephardi Jews can obtain Spanish nationality with two years of residence in Spain. From 1924 until 2015 Sephardi Jews living abroad could also ask the Spanish Government for a conferment of Spanish nationality, but the Government enjoyed full discretion as to the decision whether to grant Spanish nationality. On 24 June 2015, the Spanish Parliament approved the 12/2015 Act, the Law Granting the Nationality to Sephardi Jews, that grants the Spanish nationality automatically to Sephardi Jews living abroad, provided they can prove that they are descendants of the Sephardi Jews expelled in 1492.

In 2007, the Spanish Parliament approved the 52/2007 Act, the Law of Historical Memory. The 52/2007 Act provides for the descendants of Spaniards living abroad that left Spain because of political persecution during the Civil War and Franco's dictatorship – that is the period between 1936 and 1975 – to obtain Spanish nationality.

Finally, following the Anglo-Dutch capture of Gibraltar in August 1704 during the War of the Spanish Succession, the Spanish population left, citing their loyalty to the Bourbons and establishing themselves in the surrounding area (which has come to be known as the "Campo de Gibraltar"). The Spanish population established institutions similar to those they maintained in Gibraltar, including the census and the archives in the City of San Roque, which is the city "where Gibraltar lives on". Some of the population's descendants have cited the right of return in order to return to Gibraltar, although their requests have not been currently addressed by the Spanish government.

=== United States of America ===
The Fourteenth Amendment of the U.S. Constitution guarantees United States citizenship to those born in the United States of America according to jus soli ('right of soil'), which is solely based on the place of birth. There are few exceptions, most notably- when a parent has diplomatic immunity (i.e. not a "subject to the US law"). However, acts of Congress also provide for US citizenship for children born outside the country to a U.S. citizen under the principle of jus sanguinis. Generally, acquisition of citizenship at birth abroad depends on whether, at the time of the child's birth, one or both of the parents was a U.S. citizen; the gender of the U.S. citizen-parent, and whether the parents were married at the time of the child's birth. Numerous courts have held that U.S. citizens, including acquired citizens, who are outside the United States have a fundamental right to return to the country.

Large-scale deportations of undocumented immigrants from the United States have resulted in a diaspora of U.S. citizens, especially of Mexican Americans. Children born in the United States to undocumented immigrants became U.S. citizens at birth and, subsequently, joined their parents in Mexico due in part to immigration enforcement. Over time, these U.S. citizens have had children of their own in Mexico, giving rise to a generation of Mexican-born children who acquired U.S. citizenship at birth. These acquired citizens struggle to prove their U.S. citizenship and have been falsely deported and imprisoned when exercising their right to return to the United States.

== See also ==
- Accidental American
- Back-to-Africa movement / Rastafari movement
- Birthright Armenia
- Canadians of convenience
- Diaspora politics (Diaspora nationalism)
- Freedom of movement
- Internally Displaced Persons
- Jus sanguinis
- Law of Return
- Nationality law
- Overseas Citizenship of India, a scheme allowing foreign citizens with ancestral origins in India to obtain permanent residency in India
- Renunciation
- Right of asylum
- Right to homeland
- Voluntary return
