= Northern Cyprus–United States relations =

- Northern Cyprus: United States

Diplomatic mission
- Representative Office of Northern Cyprus to the United States: Ambassadorship Office of the United States in North Nicosia

Northern Cyprus and the United States do not have official diplomatic relations as the United States does not recognize Northern Cyprus as a sovereign nation and instead recognizes the region of Northern Cyprus as part of Cyprus. Despite no formal relations between the two nations, Northern Cyprus has appointed Ambassadors to the United States and has a representative office in Washington, D.C. which serves as its de facto embassy. Northern Cyprus also maintains a Representative office in New York City serving as a de facto consulate-general and as a de facto Permanent Mission to the United Nations. The United States on the other hand has a diplomatic office in North Nicosia as part of its embassy in Nicosia to Cyprus.

== History ==
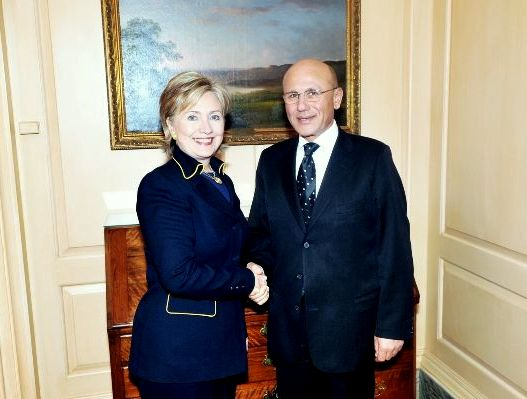
U.S. Secretary of State Hillary Clinton and Turkish Republic of Northern Cyprus President Mehmet Ali Talat in Washington, D.C., 15 April 2009.

The official position of the United States on Northern Cyprus is that it "regards the status quo on Cyprus as unacceptable and supports efforts to reach a comprehensive settlement to reunify the island as a bizonal, bicommunal federation. Successive U.S. administrations have viewed UN-facilitated, Cypriot-led settlement negotiations based on a bizonal, bicommunal federation framework as the best means to achieve a fair and permanent settlement. The United States urges all parties to demonstrate the necessary openness, flexibility, and willingness to compromise to restart formal talks, implement confidence-building measures, and improve bicommunal relations."

On April 15, 1991, Secretary of State James Baker met with the founding President of Northern Cyprus Rauf Denktaş. This meeting marked the first interaction between senior leaders from both countries. The meeting was a result of an effort by George H. W. Bush to organize a conference for September which failed to materialize.

On May 4, 2004, during a meeting discussing the Annan Plan to end the Cyprus dispute at the United Nations, Secretary of State Colin Powell met with then-Prime Minister of Northern Cyprus, Mehmet Ali Talat. Talat stated to the press that the U.S. could end the isolation of Turkish Cypriots.

Later on May 26, the State Department issued a written statement announcing it no longer recognized President Rauf Denktaş as the leader of Northern Cyprus instead recognizing Talat as the leader of the country. The move was seen as a response to Denktaş rejecting the Annan Plan to resolve the Cypriot conflict.

The following year on October 28, 2005, Secretary of State Condoleezza Rice met with then-President Talat for half an hour. This was the first time the leader of Northern Cyprus visited Washington to hold direct talks with American officials. After the rejection of the Annan Plan, Talat stated the plan was still on the table after it was rejected by 76% of Greek Cypriots in a referendum vote the previous year. And would be willing to hear changes to the plan by Cyprus.

On April 15, 2009, then-President Talat, met with then-Secretary of State, Hillary Clinton. The meeting revolved around trying to find a solution to the Cyprus dispute and try to reunify Cyprus. Talat stated that the meeting lasted a bit over half an hour and stated that the approach of the Obama administration was "very warm". An American official told the media after the meeting that the U.S. is also in close contact with Northern Cyprus as much as the Republic of Cyprus.

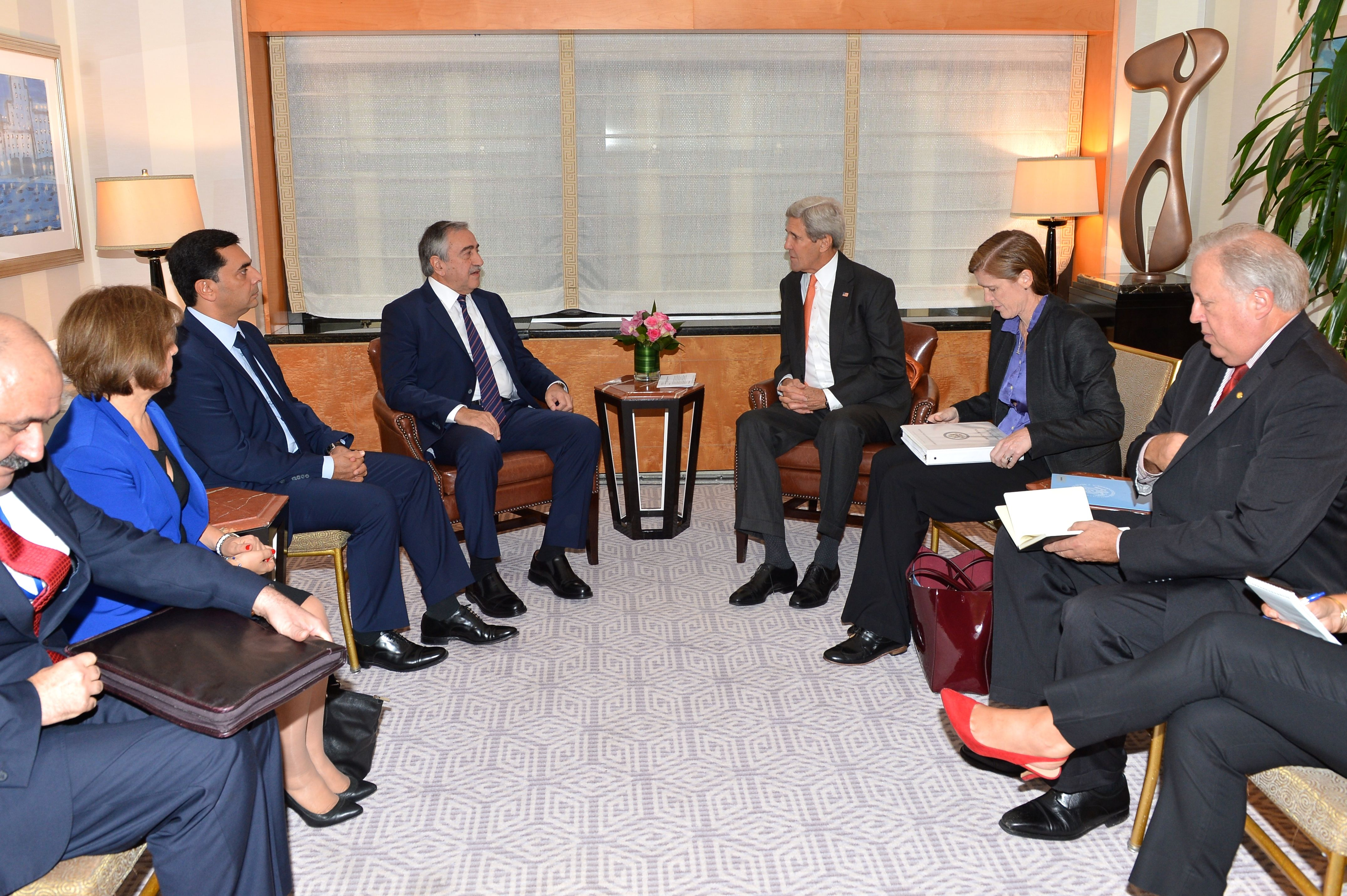
Mustafa Akıncı meeting with John Kerry on 2 October 2015.

In March 2010, Clinton had invited Talat to the U.S. for talks by the end of the month. However, Talat stated he would reply to the invite by the following week. Talat responded the following week that he would meet with Clinton if she was willing to visit Europe in the next few days as it would mean going back and forth for four days and the upcoming presidential elections in which he was running for reelection.

On October 2, 2015, Secretary of State John Kerry met with the President of Northern Cyprus, Mustafa Akıncı, on the sidelines of the Seventieth session of the United Nations General Assembly exchanging each other's views on bi-zonality and bi-communality.

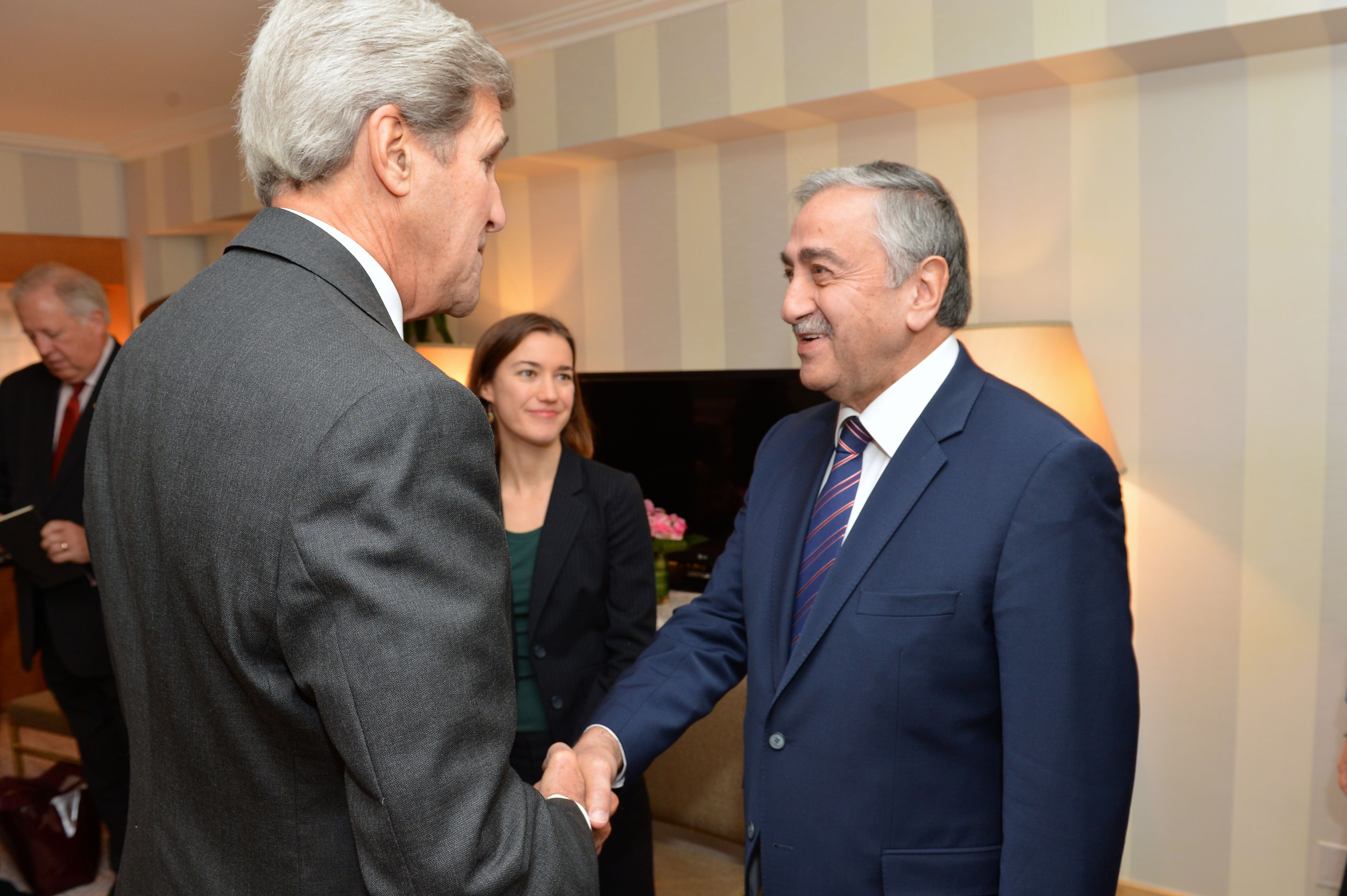
John Kerry shaking hands with Mustafa Akıncı on October 2, 2015.

On December 3, 2015, John Kerry made visits to both Cyprus and Northern Cyprus meeting with both the President of Cyprus, Nicos Anastasiades, and the President of Northern Cyprus, Mustafa Akıncı, each individually, and then together shaking hands with both men. The visit marked the first time a sitting Secretary of State met with leaders of both Cyprus administrations in the respective nations. Kerry stated that a deal to end the conflict was in reach stating, "I am more convinced than ever that a settlement is within reach. This will not happen automatically, but it can be done. A united Cyprus can stand as a beacon for peace in a troubled region of the world. It has been a priority for me and President Obama. I am impressed with both Nicos and Mustafa. Our focus must be on what we can change. Today I have witnessed that desire".

Upon the announcement by the TRNC to reopen Varosha in October 2020, Secretary of State Mike Pompeo called the move "provocative" and urged a reversal when speaking with Nikos Christodoulides, the Foreign Minister of Cyprus. The State Department cited the move as being inconsistent with UN Security Council Resolution 550 and 789.

On September 11, 2020, Mike Pompeo visited Cyprus meeting with Cyprus' President Nicos Anastasiades and Foreign Minister Nikos Christodoulides. The President of Northern Cyprus, Mustafa Akıncı, viewed the visit as unacceptable as Pompeo did not also visit the TRNC. He stated, "This is a wrong decision for US diplomacy, which claims to help solve problems". The U.S. Ambassador to Cyprus, Judith Garber, during a phone call told Akıncı that Pompeo's visit only to the Greek administered Cyprus was due to a "lack of time" and stated the U.S. stance on the Cyprus issue hadn't changed. The U.S. embassy in Cyprus also told Akıncı that Pompeo could have a phone call with him, however, Akıncı rejected it saying it would not be enough or appropriate. Akıncı's statement was based on the precedent established by John Kerry when he visited both the Greek and Turkish administered regions of Cyprus in 2015 when he was Secretary of State.

== See also ==
- Foreign relations of Northern Cyprus
- Foreign relations of the United States
- Cyprus–United States relations
- Cyprus problem
- Toumazou v. Republic of Turkey
