= Women in Cyprus =

General statistics
- Maternal mortality (per 100,000): 10 (2010)
- Women in parliament: 19.6% (2016)
- Women over 25 with secondary education: 71.0% (2010)
- Women in labour force: 58.6% (employment rate Eurostat definition, 2014)

Gender Inequality Index
- Value: 0.123 (2021)
- Rank: 35th out of 191

Global Gender Gap Index
- Value: 0.696 (2022)
- Rank: 93rd out of 146

Cypriot women were greatly affected by changes in the wake of World War II, as they received expanded access to education and increased participation in the national workforce. Cyprus women have made great advancements in their society not just pertaining to education and the workplace, but also more women are beginning to hold political offices as well.

== History of Cypriot women ==
Even at the beginning of the 1990s, Cypriot women were still burdened with the expectation of safeguarding the honor of the family. According to tradition, a woman's duty was to protect herself against all criticism of sexual immodesty.

A study carried out in a farming community in the mid-1970s found that women were still expected to avoid any social contact with men that could be construed to have a sexual context. An expressed desire for male company was seen to reflect poorly on a woman's honor, and virginity was seen by many villagers, both men and women, to be a precondition for marriage. The honor of a family, that is, the sense of dignity of its male members, depended on the sexual modesty and virtue of its women. These traditional attitudes have waned somewhat in recent decades, especially in urban areas, but were still prevalent in the early 1990s. Another indication of the conservative nature of Greek Cypriot society at the beginning of the 1990s was that the feminist movement in Cyprus was often the object of ridicule from both sexes. Nevertheless, women's increasing economic independence was a force for liberation in all sections of the population.

Women's roles in Cyprus have changed over the years. In the past, Cyprus women's main expectations were to get married and have children. Their schooling was little to none and many women did not work outside their homes. If you ask a woman in Cyprus if her social role is different from that of men, many of them will disagree. Today, many Cyprus women have jobs outside of their homes and receive a higher education. Even so, women still continue to keep up with the domestic work that their home life requires of them. Something that hasn't changed in Cyprus is the idea that women should be seen and not heard, or should listen rather than speak. Due to gender socialization, women in Cyprus are known to keep their goals and successes to themselves.

== Education ==
In 1859 the Limassol School for Girls was founded as the first school for girls, and its principal Polyxeni Loizias became a voice promoting the education of women in public debate as well as by founding a course for adult women teachers as well as organizing for women to get a university education abroad before this was a possible in Cyprus. A public secular education system was introduced in 1895, women were guaranteed the right to study and work in the public educational system in the Educational Law of 1923, and the higher secondary education became public when the Girls' School of Phaneromeni in Nicosia became a part of the Pancyprian Gymnasium in 1935.

At the beginning of the 20th century, the proportion of girls to boys enrolled in primary education was one to three. By 1943, some 80 percent of Cypriot girls attended primary school. When, in 1960, elementary education was made compulsory, the two sexes were equally enrolled. By the 1980s, girls made up 45 percent of those receiving secondary education. Only after the mid-1960s did women commonly leave Cyprus to receive higher education. In the 1980s, women made up about 32 percent of those studying abroad.

== Female employment ==
The participation of Cypriot women in the workforce has been steadily increasing. In 1976 women's share in the workforce was 30 percent and a rise to 37 percent in 1985. Today women's share in the workforce is 44 percent. 62.1% of women between the ages of 15–64 years old are active in workforce.

Cyprus has long had a high degree of female participation in the workforce. In the period 1960-85, women's share of the work force rose only slightly, from 40.8 percent to 42.2 percent. However, where women worked changed greatly. Women's share of the urban workforce rose from 22 percent to 41 percent, while their share of the rural workforce fell from 51 percent to 44.4 percent. The decline in rural areas stemmed from the overall shift away from agricultural work, where women's contribution had always been vital, to employment in urban occupations.

The occupational segregation of the sexes was still persistent in Cyprus at the beginning of the 1990s. Even though the participation of women in clerical jobs had more than doubled since the late 1970s, only one woman in fifteen was in an administrative or managerial position in 1985. Women's share of professional jobs increased to 39 percent by the mid-1980s, compared with 36 percent ten years earlier, but these jobs were concentrated in medicine and teaching, where women had traditionally found employment. In fields where men were dominant, women's share of professional positions amounted to only 11 percent, up from 8 percent in 1976. In the fields where women were dominant, men took just under half the professional positions.

Nonetheless, there is still room for improvement pertaining to the gender equality Cyprus women are experiencing in the workforce. Not only do women represent 14.4% of high posts, women are also paid on average 24% less per hour compared to their male counterparts. The equal pay-equal work principle would help to solve this problem, but the women are generally in lower positions than men, resulting in the unequal pay.

According to the 2006 Population Census, the unemployment rate for women was 19%, whereas for men it was 6%. In 2010, the unemployment rate was 17.5% for women a and 8.9% for men. Even though the unemployment rate for women is decreasing, the rate is still twice as high compared to men.

=== Welfare ===
Cypriot women enjoy the same rights to social welfare as men in such matters as social security payments, unemployment compensation, vacation time, and other common social provisions. In addition, after 1985 women benefited from special protective legislation that provided them with marriage and maternity grants that paid them 75 percent of their insurable earnings. Still, a large number of women, including the self-employed and unpaid family workers on farms, were not covered by the Social Insurance Scheme. These women constituted 28 percent of the economically active female population.

In 1985, the Republic of Cyprus ratified the United Nations Convention on the Elimination of all Forms of Discrimination against Women. Despite ratification of this agreement, as of late 1990 there was no legislation in the Republic of Cyprus that guaranteed the right to equal pay for work of equal value, nor the right of women to the same employment opportunities.

== Politics ==
The British colonial authorities gave women the right to vote for education committees for tax reasons in the Education Amendment Law 1906 without any prior activism in the issue, but the reform was retracted after big protests from the male population.

In May 1931 the male politician Kyriakos Rossides suggested the introduction of women's suffrage in the Legislative Council with the argument that women paid taxes and most (Western) countries had already introduced the reform, but the male politicians voted down the reform with the argument that not even all men had suffrage yet, and the following year, the British dissolved the Cypriot Legislative Council, and the issue was put on hold.

Women's suffrage was introduced in Cyprus in the new constitution after independence in 1961, because women's suffrage had at that time became a given standard in international democratic standard, rather than because of any prior activism in the issue.

Women are present in very few political positions in Cyprus, but the following are some of the women who have held or currently hold a political position:

- Praxoula Antoniadou- President of the United Democrats (March 2007 – Present), She attends the meetings of the leaders of the Greek and Cypriot political parties as well as being an active participant.
- Erato Kozakou-Marcoullis- Minister of Foreign Affairs (August 2011 - February 2013), Ministry of Foreign Affairs (1980-2007), Ambassador of the Republic of Cyprus to the United States of America (1998-2003)
- Eleni Mavrou- First female mayor of Cyprus' capital (2006-2011), Minister of Interior of the Republic of Cyprus (until February 2013)
- Antigoni Papadopoulou- First Woman to serve as Chair of the House’s Committee of Economic Affairs and Budgeting (2006–2009), President of GOIDK, Member of the Municipal Council of Strovolos, Member of the House of Representative of Cyprus, Mayor of Morphu, Parliamentary Assembly of the Council of Europe, Member of the European Parliament
- Sibel Siber- Turkish Cypriot politician and the first Cypriot woman to serve as the Prime Minister of the Turkish Republic of Northern Cyprus in 2013. As of November 2015, Siber serves as the Speaker of Parliament, the Republican Assembly of Northern Cyprus.
- Androulla Vassiliou- European Commissioner for Health (March 2008- February 2010), European Commissioner for Education, Culture, Multilingualism and Youth (February 2010-November 2014)

=== Women's movement ===
In the late 19th-century, Polyxeni Loizias (1855-1942) participated in the public debate in favor of women's right to education and professional life, but there was no organized women's movement until the mid 20th-century. Persophone Papadopulou (1887-1948) published the first feminist periodical, the Estiades (1913-1915), but this became an isolated phenomena for a small minority of educated elite women and did not start any organized activism on Cyprus, were many women were still illiterate at the time.

Women first started to organize on Cyprus in the 1930s, and their groups was founded within the already existent political associations, such as the women's groups of the CPC and AKEL parties: the Pancyprian Organization of Democratic Women (PODG), which was founded within the AKEL in 1950, has been called the first feminist women's organization on Cyprus.

== Notable women ==
- Caterina Cornaro - The last reigning Queen of Cyprus during the Lusignan/Venetian periods
- Suzan Ari - Advocate for reform in Cyprus pertaining to education, social movements, and protecting cultural heritage
- Lia Vissi - Singer, songwriter, and politician in Cyprus

== Violence against women in Cyprus ==
Studies show that socioeconomic patterns play a big role in violence against women in Cyprus, specifically domestic violence. Women who possess characteristics such as having little to no education, reside in Urban areas, are of older age, and struggle financially are said to be especially susceptible to domestic violence. Due to there not being a national survey conducted focusing on domestic violence against women in Cyprus, statistics and findings can only be discovered through the police or through Association of the Prevention and Handling of Violence in the Family. The reports to the police have drastically been increasing each year. In 2002, 538 cases were reported, whereas in 2008 that number almost doubled with 969 cases being reported. During the years between 2002 and 2008, 71.18 percent of the victims were women. During the years between 2004 and 2009, the number of cases triples and 80 percent of victims are women, whereas 8.6% of victims are men. Of these cases, 79 percent involved physical violence, 18.5 percent involved psychological violence, and 2.4 percent involved sexual violence. The annual report from Association of the Prevention and Handling of Violence in the Family reveals that out of a total of 1051 incidents, 815 of them include women between the ages of 41-50 who were abused. Furthermore. 96.1 percent of these incidents involve psychological violence and 78 percent reside with their attacker.

Cyprus made marital rape illegal in 1994.

== See also ==
- Women in Northern Cyprus
- Women in Europe
