= Alexandra Papadopoulou =

Alexandra Papadopoulou may refer to:

- Alexandra Papadopoulou (author) (1867–1906), Ottoman Greek writer
- Alexandra Papadopoulou (diplomat) (born 1957), Greek diplomat
