= GlobaLex =

Online publication providing research tools for law

GlobaLex is an online publication of the Hauser Global Law School Program at the New York University School of Law providing research tools for comparative law, international law, and the laws of various jurisdictions around the world. It was launched in 2005 by editor-in-chief Mirela Roznovschi, then NYU Law School's Foreign and International Law Reference Librarian, with the support of professor Joseph H. H. Weiler and dean Richard Revesz. Roznovschi conceived of the project while in Armenia as a guest instructor in legal research, and in 2003 after her return to NYU, she discussed the idea with Weiler, who came up with the name.

GlobaLex publishes articles both on topical areas, such as treaty research (particularly travaux préparatoires), regional trade agreements in Africa, or the TRIPS Agreement, as well as guides to the laws of specific jurisdictions. By 2007, GlobaLex had coverage of more than 80 jurisdictions. By 2012, that had expanded to a total of 195 research guides, including 144 guides for specific jurisdictions, 15 comparative law guides, and 32 international law guides. As editor-in-chief, Roznovschi was responsible for finding authors who are experts in their topic areas to write guides to specific jurisdictions or topic areas, and to supervise the process of writing the article. Some authors write a guide in a foreign language and have it translated into English, with the whole process often taking as long as a year. GlobaLex pays a small honorarium to authors to offset basic expenses. In 2017, Lucie Olejnikova replaced Roznovschi as editor-in-chief following the retirement of the latter.

Because of GlobaLex's breadth, law librarians frequently recommend it as a valuable resource for legal research. Some commenters in 2007 noted that the depth of coverage varied greatly by jurisdiction and that greater standardization would be helpful. A 2016 review evaluated GlobaLex favorably under information search process criteria, though criticized it for its lack of current awareness tools. Roznovschi was the recipient of the American Association of Law Libraries' Reynolds & Flores Award in 2015 for her work on GlobaLex.
