= Loizidou v. Turkey =

European court case

Decided 18 December 1996
- Full case name: Loizidou v. Turkey
- Case: 40/1993/435/514
- Chamber: Grand Chamber
- Language of proceedings: English
- Nationality of parties: Cypriot; Turkish

Ruling
- Violation of Article 1 of Protocol 1 to the European Convention on Human Rights
- President; Rolv Ryssdal
- Judges: Rudolf Bernhardt; Feyyaz Gölcüklü; Louis-Edmond Pettiti; Brian Walsh; Alphonse Spielmann; Sibrand Karel Martens; Elisabeth Palm; Raimo Pekkanen; Andreas Nicolas Loizou; José María Morenilla; András Baka; Manuel Antonio Lopes Rocha; Luzius Wildhaber; Giuseppe Mifsud Bonnici; Peter Jambrek; Uno Lõhmus

Case opinions
- Majority: Ryssdal, joined by Walsh, Spielmann, Martens, Palm, Pekkanen, Loizou, Morenilla, Wildhaber, Bonnici, Lõhmus
- Concurrence: Wildhaber, joined by Ryssdal
- Dissent: Bernhardt, joined by Lopes Rocha
- Dissent: Baka
- Dissent: Jambrek
- Dissent: Petitti
- Dissent: Gölcüklü

Loizidou v. Turkey is a landmark legal case regarding the rights of refugees wishing to return to their former homes and properties.

The European Court of Human Rights ruled that Titina Loizidou, and consequently all other refugees, have the right to return to their former properties. The ECHR ruled that Turkey had violated Loizidou's human rights under Article I of Protocol I of the European Convention on Human Rights, that she should be allowed to return to her home and that Turkey should pay damages to her. Turkey initially ignored this ruling.

On 22 July 1989 a Cypriot national Loizidou filed an application against Turkey to the European Court of Human Rights, represented by Greek-Cypriot lawyer Achilleas Demetriades. Loizidou had been forced out of her home during Turkey's invasion of Cyprus in 1974 along with around 200,000 other Greek-Cypriots. During more than 20 years, she made a number of attempts to return to her home in Kyrenia but was denied entry into the Turkish occupied part of Cyprus by the Turkish army.

Her application resulted in three judgments by the European Court of Human Rights (Strasbourg) which held Turkey responsible for human rights violations in the northern part of Cyprus, which is under overall control of the Turkish armed forces.

The U.S. Department of State commented on this case as follows:

In 1996 the European Court of Human Rights ruled 11 to 6 that Turkey committed a continuing violation of the rights of a Greek Cypriot woman by preventing her from going to her property located in north Cyprus. The ruling reaffirmed the validity of property deeds issued prior to 1974. The Court also found in this case that "it was obvious from the large number of troops engaged in active duties in northern Cyprus that the Turkish army exercised effective overall control there. In the circumstances of the case, this entailed Turkey's responsibility for the policies and actions of the 'TRNC'". In July the Court ordered Turkey to pay the woman approximately $915,000 in damages and costs by October 28. Initially Turkey declined to pay the damages awarded. The Turkish Government stated that it cannot implement the Court's decision, which it contends is a political decision, and argued that the land in question is not Turkish but is part of the "Turkish Republic of Northern Cyprus". The Council of Europe (COE) during 1999 continued to call on the Turkish Government to comply with the Court's decision. In October the COE Committee of Ministers' Deputies voted to deplore Turkey's lack of compliance. A number of similar cases have been filed with the ECHR.

The court also stated expressly that the damages awarded were not compensation for the property per se, but only for the denial of the ownership and use of the property, and that Loizidou retains full legal ownership of her property.

In 2003 Turkey paid Loizidou the compensation amounts (of over $1 million) ruled by the European Court of Human Rights.

== Precedent ==
The case serves as important precedent for judgments in international courts of law regarding the Cyprus dispute. Similar cases have been brought to the ECHR are awaiting judgement and two have been concluded in a similar fashion:

- May 2007: Myra Xenides v. Turkey, where Myra Xenides was awarded damages for loss of use of her property in Famagusta.
- April 2008: Demades v. Turkey, where Ioannis Demades was awarded damages amounting to €835,000 for loss of use of his Kyrenia property.

The Loizidou case was also cited in the 2001 judgment on the interstate case Cyprus v. Turkey.

== See also ==
- Apostolides v Orams
- Eleni Foka
- Greek Cypriots, et al. v. TRNC and HSBC Bank USA
- Human rights in Turkey
- Human rights in Northern Cyprus
