= Osman Ertuğ =

Turkish-Cypriot diplomat (born 1949)

Mr. Osman Ertuğ (born 1949) served as the de facto ambassador of the Turkish Republic of Northern Cyprus (TRNC) to the United States of America from 2002 to 2007, when he was succeeded by Hilmi Akil. As the TRNC is not recognized as sovereign, his title was officially that of Representative of the Turkish Cypriot Community in Washington DC.

Mr. Ertuğ served as the Representative of the TRNC in New York (de facto Chief of Mission to the United Nations) before taking up his Washington DC posting. He is regarded by the TRNC Foreign Ministry as a very capable diplomat.

Mr. Ertuğ is one of the framers of the TRNC's Unilateral Declaration of Independence.
