= Women in Northern Cyprus =

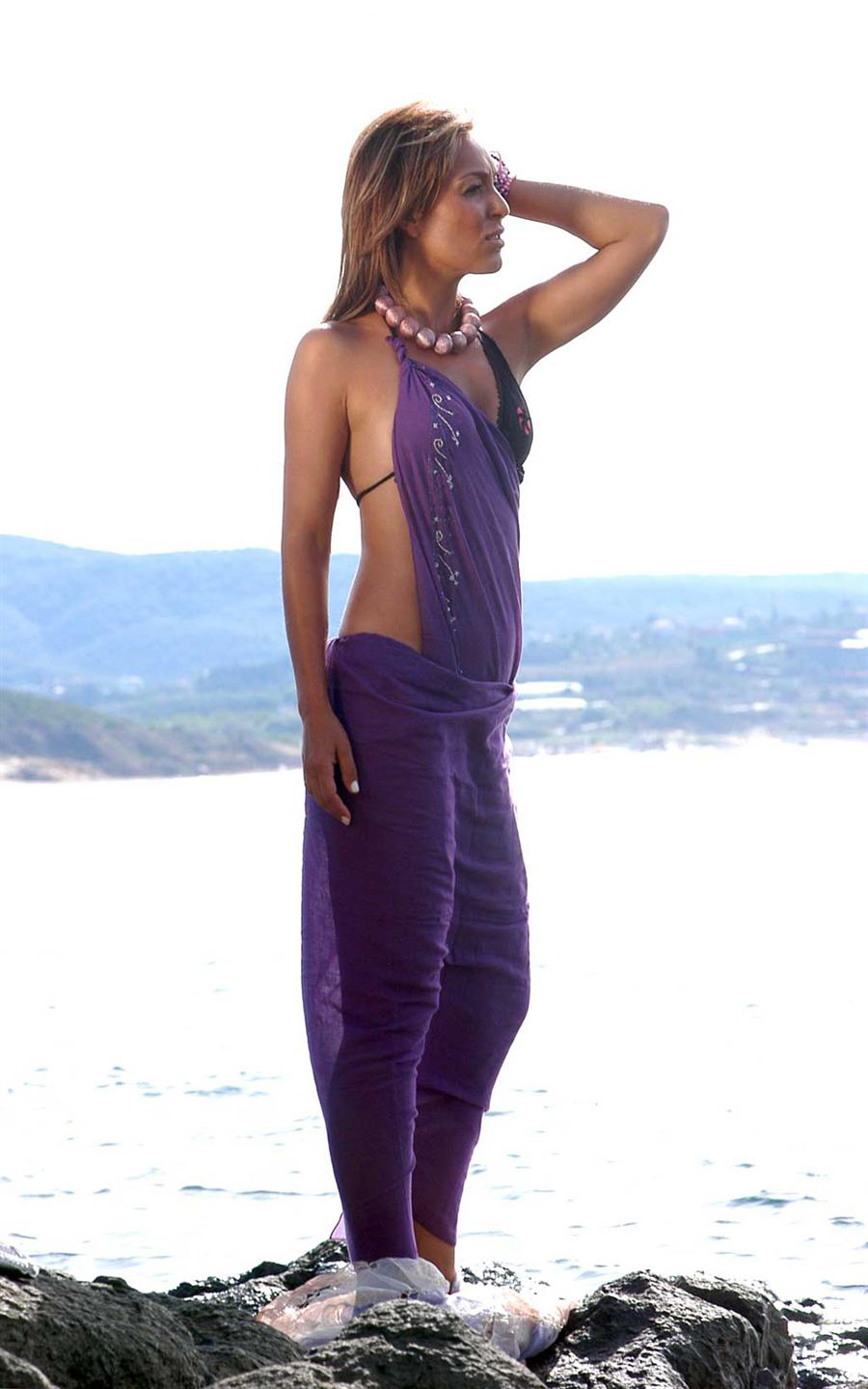
- Ziynet Sali, a female singer from Northern Cyprus

General statistics
- Women in parliament: 18% (2018)
- Women in labour force: 39-40% (2015)

The women in Northern Cyprus are inhabitants of the internationally unrecognised Turkish Republic of Northern Cyprus, where they have been contributors to the fields of science, law and justice. However, several factors have inhibited women's participation in politics, and women constitute only 8% of the Assembly of the Republic. In 2013, Sibel Siber became the first female prime minister of Northern Cyprus.

Northern Cyprus has no active women's shelters. In 2014, the parliament unanimously voted to establish a department promoting gender equality, which is establishing institutions for women's welfare.

== Societal attitudes ==
A survey of 600 women in 2010 for the Association for Support for Life from Women (KAYAD) indicated that 51% of women agreed that women had to conform to pre-determined gender roles, 88% agreed that above all else, women should be good mothers and caretakers of the home, 58% believed that women should be home before their husbands and 80% believed that girls should be raised to become "ladies", 20% believed that widowed or divorced women should not live alone. 40% stated that they had difficulties in achieving their goals due to societal pressure, while 38% believed that it was not as important for women to have a significant role in public life in comparison to men. 55% believed that women should be able to work outside the family even if not necessitated by economic conditions.

== Politics ==
Constraints affecting women who have entered politics in Northern Cyprus include investing time for home, motherhood, family, and political life. The fact that coffeehouses and meyhane (traditional drinking taverns), social spaces that have been traditionally reserved for men, remain central to Turkish Cypriot politics is a restraining factor for women. Even some regional headquarters of political parties function as coffeehouses.

=== Female politicians ===
As of 2010, there were only 7 female Northern Cypriots who held high-level positions in the Parliament of Northern Cyprus. The posts that the women occupied included parliamentarian and ministerial jobs, such as the Speaker of the House of Representatives and the appointed Minister of Education. Fatma Ekenoğlu was the Speaker of the House of Representatives. Onur Borman was the Minister of the Ministry of Economy and Finance and was also the Minister of the Ministry of Public Works between 1993 and 1999. Gülsen Bozkurt was the former Minister of the Ministry of Health. Gülin Sayıner was one of the first two elected female members of the Parliament of Northern Cyprus (Republican Assembly) and served from 1987 to 1993. Şerife Ünverdi used to be the Minister of Labor and Social Security. These women were able to reach out to voters of Northern Cyprus because of their medical backgrounds. In 2013, Sibel Siber became the first female prime minister of Northern Cyprus and is running for president from the ruling Republican Turkish Party (CTP) in the 2015 presidential election. In spite of this, women constitute only 8% of the parliament as of 2015. Only 4 out of 47 female candidates were elected in the 2013 parliamentary election.

On February 29, 1980, Gönül Başaran Erönen became the first female Justice of Northern Cyprus. She was also appointed as the first female District Court Judge in Cyprus. At present, she is the only female justice of the Supreme Court on the whole island of Cyprus.

In 2015, a new Political Parties Law brought a quota requiring that at least 30% of candidates for member of parliament are selected from each sex by each party. Any party that does not fulfill this requirement may not participate in elections.

== Violence against women ==
In 2014, 204 women filed complaints to the police reporting violence against them. Aziz Gürpınar, the Minister of Labour and Social Security at the time, called the figure "frightening". Between 2013 and 2015, the number of complaints was 442 in total, and according to Asım Akansoy, Minister of the Interior at the time, only 10% of victims were estimated to have reported violence. Northern Cyprus ratified the Istanbul Convention in 2011. A survey of 1000 married women in 2012 by the non-governmental organization Feminist Workshop found that 33% of married women experienced violence, while the participants reported knowing on average 2.58 women who experienced violence from their partners. 14% of women reported having experienced marital rape.

Due to the lack of a reliable public transport system, students in Northern Cyprus sometimes have to hitchhike. Students have reported that female students often face sexual harassment in these hikes, while male students also reported harassment.

== Employment ==
According to a 2015 survey by the State Planning Organization, 39-40% of women participated in the workforce as opposed to 71-72% of men. Female unemployment rate was found to be 8.9%, as opposed to 6.5% for men, and 36.5% of all employees were women. It was also found that 85.7% of women were employed in the services sector, as opposed to 67.8% of men. The same survey in 2008 indicated that only 36.2% of women participated in the workforce as opposed to 67.1% of men. Female unemployment rate was found to be 14%, as opposed to 7.6% for men, and 32.6% of all employees were women.

The Plan for the Support of Local Employment, whose implementation started in 2013, prioritised the increase of women's participation in the workforce. The plan resulted in the employment of 2091 women along with 1812 men until January 2015. The plan also allowed 78 women to start businesses in 39 sectors. These women owned their own businesses for the first time.

== Organizations ==
The first and only academic research and training center for women in Northern Cyprus is the Center for Women's Studies (CWS) of the Eastern Mediterranean University (EMU). It was established on November 17, 1998. The Cyprus Research Center of the Near East University also conducts research on women's human rights in Northern Cyprus. The first women's shelter in Northern Cyprus was opened by the Foundation for the Prevention of Social Risks in 2011; the center has been supported by volunteers and companies. However, the shelter was unable to host the victims of human trafficking and prostitution due to concerns over safety and lack of resources. In 2016, the shelter was permanently closed due to difficulties with security.

In 2014, the Turkish Cypriot parliament unanimously approved the establishment of the Communal Gender Equality Department under the Ministry of Labor and Social Security. The department has prioritized the establishment of women's shelters, Violence Prevention and Consultation Centers, a Council of Consultation and Monitoring and organizing annual gender equality conferences.

== See also ==
- Human rights in Northern Cyprus
- Women in Cyprus
