= Sappho Leontias =

Greek writer and educator (1830/1832–1900)

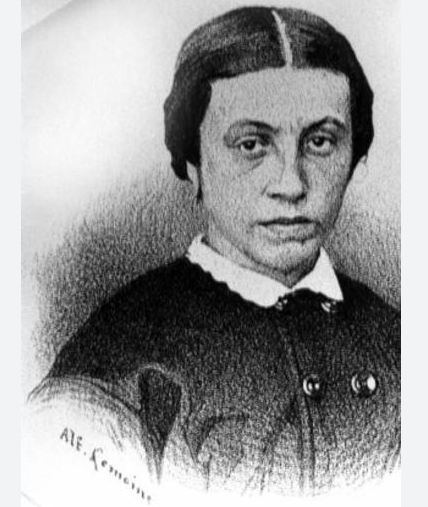
Sappho Leontias

Sappho Leontias (Greek: Σαπφώ Λεοντιάς; 1830 or 1832 – 1900) was a Cypriot writer, feminist, and educator.

== Early life and education ==
Sappho was born as Sappho Clerides (Σαπφώ Κληρίδη) either in 1830 in Constantinople or, according to other accounts, in 1832 in Moutoullas village, Nicosia district. Leontias was her literary nickname. Her father was Leontios Clerides (Λεόντιος Κληρίδης) from Marathasa, he was a well known teacher and Hellenist. Leontios was possibly the headmaster of the Greek School of Nicosia (Ελληνικής Σχολής Λευκωσίας) between 1840 and 1845. Sappho was educated by him and later founded with him a number of schools in Cyprus and in Leros. Her mother was Sophia Clerides (Σοφία Κληρίδη) and her sister Emilia Leontias-Kteni (Αιμίλια Λεοντιάς-Κτενή).

== Career ==
She taught in Nicosia schools for seven years and then at Morphou. In 1854 she went to Samos where she founded a girls school and taught for three years. For the next three years she taught at Aronis girls school (παρθεναγωγείο Αρώνη) in Smyrna and then she went back to Samos where she was the headmistress of a school for four years. Then she went back to Smyrna and taught for many years at the girl school of Agia Fotini, where one of her pupils was the also Cypriot and later educator and feminist Polyxeni Loizias. Finally, she settled in Constantinople where she taught at the Palladion girls school (παρθεναγωγείο Παλλάδιον). Where among her students was Alexandra Papadopoulou.

Ιn Constantinople she published Eurydice (1870–1873), together with her sister Emilia Leontias, the first Greek literary journal that was directed by a woman. In the journal she published a large amount of her own work. In her literary work she published mostly romantic poetry with subjects inspired from nature, the motherland and religion. She also wrote short stories, articles, studies and various school textbooks. She translated Jean Racine from the French and Homer as well as Aeschylus's The Persians into modern Greek. In 1887, she published a book on home economics, Oikiaki oikonomia pros hrisin ton Parthenagogeion. She published only a small part of her work in a book in Constantinople in 1899, entitled Ὁ Ἀνήρ καί ἡ Γυνή.

She advocated for educational opportunities for Greek women. She became active advocating women's rights, particularly the right to education.

== Personal life ==
She was married to Narlis, a member of the so-called Greek Ottoman assembly. They had a daughter called Korinna (or Corina) who married the doctor D. Logiades (Δ. Λογιάδης). Korinna had a daughter in Paris, Anna. Anna then had Korinna in Alexandria. Korinna was married to the son of Adamandios Kaloghiros, a Greek Chiot industrialist. Johny and Korinna Kalogirou had three kids: Ioli, Melita and Mandicos. Ioli had to kids Alex Patelis and Korinna Patelis with Yiannis Patelis the nephew of Greece most famous modernist sculptor Lazaros Lameras.

== Publications ==
- Λεοντιάς, Σ. (1858). Περί πολιτισμού: λόγος εκφωνηθείς την ΚΔ' Αυγούστου 1858, καθ' ην ημέραν ετελέσθησαν τα εγκαίνια του εν Σμύρνη Ελληνικού Παρθεναγωγείου. Εν Σμύρνη: Εκ του τυπογραφείου της Αμαλθείας.
- Λεοντιάς, Σ. (1865). Ελεγείον εις τον Αοίδιμον Ιεράρχην Ρόδου Δωρόθεον. Εν Κωνσταντινουπόλει: Τύποις Οθωμ. Φιλ. Συλλόγου.
- Λεοντιάς, Σ. (1881). Χριστομάθεια κορασιακή προς χρήσιν των παρθεναγωγείων εις τόμους δέκα δια τας τρεις περιόδους της κορασιακής εκπαιδεύσεως την προπαιδευτικήν ή πρώτην, την μέσην και την ανωτέραν, περιέχουσα τα προς διδασκαλίαν της Ελληνικής γλώσσης νεωτέρας τε και αρχαίας μαθήματα, και τα ηθικά ή μορφωτικά του ήθους της Ελληνίδος κόρης κατά τον προορισμόν αυτής. Τόμος δεύτερος, περιέχων τα βιογραφικά, ηθικά και γλωσσικά μαθήματα της Βας τάξεως κατά το Βον έτος της προπαιδευτικής ή Αης περιόδου της των κορασίων εκπαιδεύσεως. Τεύχος πρώτον. Εν Σμύρνη: Βιβλιοπωλείον "Ο Κοραής".
- Λεοντιάς, Σ. (1887). Οικιακή Οικονομία προς χρήσιν των παρθεναγωγείων. Κωνταντινούπολη: Α. Κορομηλάς.
- Λεοντιάς, Σ. (1891), Λόγος. Εφημερίς των Κυριών, αρ. 236 (24 Νοέμβρη), σσ. 5-6.
- Λεοντιάς, Σ. (1895). Διδασκαλία των συνθέσεων κατά μαθήματα μετά παραδειγμάτων και οδηγιών προς χρήσιν των αρρεναγωγείων και παρθεναγωγείων εις τεύχη: τεύχος δεύτερον, δια την Γ' και Δ' τάξιν σχολείου (Παρθεναγωγείων) και την Δ και Ε τάξιν (Αρρεναγωγείων). Εν Κωνσταντινουπόλει: Πωλείται παρά τοις Αδελφοίς Σφύρα, εκ του τυπογραφείου Α. Κορομηλά.
- Λεοντιάς, Σ. (1895). Περί του γυναικείου ζητήματος, Εφημερίς των Κυριών, αρ. 400 (28 Μαΐου):2-3, 402 (11 Ιουνίου):3-4.
- Λεοντιάς, Σ. (1899). Ο ανήρ και η γυνή: διαλέξεις τρεις αναγνωσθείσαι εν τω Ελληνικώ Φιλολογικώ Συλλόγω και πέντε ποιήματα. Εν Κωνσταντινουπόλει: Τύποις Αδελφών Γεράρδων.

== Publications about Leontias ==
- Αλιμπέρτη, Σ. (1900). Σαπφώ Λεοντιάς η του Γένους διδάσκαλος, Πλειάς 2, αρ. 8-9:130-131, αρ. 10:153-155, αρ. 11-12, σ. 183-184.
- Δεβιάζης, Σπ. (1912). Διαπρεπείς Ελληνίδες κατά το 19ο αιώνα: Σαπφώ Λεοντιάς, Ελληνική Επιθεώρησις, 5, αρ. 55-60, σσ. 172- 173, 199-200.
- Μεγάλη Παιδαγωγική Εγκυκλοπαίδεια, λήμμα «Σαπφώ Λεοντιάς» (συντάκτης λήμματος Αντ. Ισηγόνης).
- Παρασκευά, Παρ. (2001). Σαπφώ Λεοντιάς (1830-1900): Παιδαγωγικές απόψεις, εκπαιδευτική δράση, κοινωνική παρουσία. Μεταπτυχ. διπλωμ. εργασία, Α.Π.Θ.
- Κωνσταντοπούλου, Α. (2006). Η Σαπφώ Λεοντίας και η γυναικεία εκπαίδευση στη Σμύρνη το 19ο αιώνα. Διπλωμ. εργασία, Πανεπιστήμιο του Αιγαίου.
- Δαλακούρα, Κ. (2013). Μεταξύ Ανατολής και Δύσης: Η Εκπαιδευτική Θεωρία της Σαπφούς Λεοντιάδος (1830-1900). Θέματα της Ιστορίας της Εκπαίδευσης. Περιοδική Έκδοση των Ελληνικής Εταιρείας των Ιστορικών της Εκπαίδευσης (ΕΛ.Ε.Ι.Ε.), 11, 89-127.

== See also ==
- Polyxeni Loizias, feminist author, student of Sappho
- Alexandra Papadopoulou (author), feminist author, student of Sappho
- Kalliroi Parren
- Persephone Papadopoulou
