= Eurydice (magazine) =

Women's magazine in Ottoman Empire (1870–1873)

- Editor: Emilia Ktena Leontias
- Categories: Women's magazine; Political magazine
- Frequency: Weekly; Every five days; Biweekly
- Founded: 1870
- First issue: 21 November 1870
- Final issue: 30 May 1873
- Country: Ottoman Empire
- Based in: Istanbul
- Language: Greek

Eurydice was one of the Greek language women's magazines published in Istanbul, Ottoman Empire. It featured women-related articles and also, articles on Greek Orthodox identity and Greek nationalism. The magazine was in circulation between 1870 and 1873.

== History and profile ==
Eurydice was first published on 21 November 1870. It was published and edited by Emilia Ktena Leontias who was a school teacher and the sister of Sappho Leontias. The frequency of the magazine varied. It was published on a weekly basis between its start on 21 November 1870 and 24 March 1871. Then it appeared every five days between 14 April 1871 and 30 October 1871. Next the magazine published biweekly from 15 January 1872 to 20 October 1872 and from 8 March 1873 to 30 May 1873. Page number of Eurydice was not also standard and varied between eight pages and twenty-four pages. The magazine folded with the issue dated 30 May 1873 after producing a total of 76 issues.

== Content ==
Eurydice had a moderate approach towards women-related issues. The magazine mostly reflected the views of Sappho Leontias concerning the connections between women question and Greek nationalism. Leontias argued that the woman was destined to live not for herself, but for the others living in the same society and the nation. Eurydice also advocated the Greek Orthodox identity.
