= Rizokarpaso Primary School for Greek Cypriots =

Primary school in Cyprus

- Rizokarpaso, Northern Cyprus; Cyprus

Information
- Language: Greek

Rizokarpaso Primary School is a Greek-Cypriot primary school in Rizokarpaso, in Northern Cyprus. For a number of years it was the only Greek language school in Northern Cyprus. It has regularly appeared in Greek language media because it was reported that primary school teachers had been prevented from teaching there by the government of Northern Cyprus.

== Notable cases ==
Eleni Foka was prevented from returning to her village and the primary school, and therefore applied to the European Court of Human Rights for justice.

Alexia Koukotsikas and her husband Grigoris Koukotsikas were primary school teachers who taught at Rizokarpaso Primary School in Northern Cyprus who were prevented, together with their children, from returning to their village and primary school by the government of Northern Cyprus. The plight of the Koukotsikas family was raised by MEP Dimitris Tsatsos at the European Parliament and in the Parliament of Cyprus by the President of the House of Representatives (Mr Demetris Christofias). The Cypriot Financial Mirror newspaper has recorded that as recently as September 2008, the government of Northern Cyprus has prevented schoolteachers from returning to the primary school in Rizokarpaso.

== See also ==
- Human rights in Northern Cyprus
- Enclaved Greek Cypriots
- Kormakitis
- Right to education
- Romanian-language schools in Transnistria
