= Human rights in Northern Cyprus =

Human rights in Northern Cyprus are protected by the constitution of Northern Cyprus. However, there have been reports of violations of the human rights of minorities, democratic freedom, freedom from discrimination, freedom from torture, freedom of movement, freedom of religion, freedom of speech, right to education, right to life, right to property, and the rights of displaced persons. The rights of Greek Cypriots displaced by the 1974 Turkish invasion of Cyprus, notably their rights to property and right of return, is one of the focal points of ongoing negotiations for the solution of the Cyprus question.

According to a United States Department of State Country Report of 2001, human rights were generally respected, although problems existed in terms of police activities, and the restriction of movement. In January 2011, The Report of the Office of the United Nations High Commissioner for Human Rights on the question of Human Rights in Cyprus noted that the ongoing division of Cyprus continues to affect human rights throughout the island "... including freedom of movement, human rights pertaining to the question of missing persons, discrimination, the right to life, freedom of religion, and economic, social and cultural rights."

== Freedoms ==
=== Democratic freedom ===
Freedom House has classified the perceived level of democratic and political freedom in Northern Cyprus as "free" since 2000 in its Freedom in the World report. In January 2024, Freedom House again classified Northern Cyprus as "free" in both political rights and civil liberties.

In January 2009, the Turkish Cypriot Human Rights Foundation reported that: "Greek Cypriots and Maronite residents [of Northern Cyprus] are prohibited from participating in Turkish Cypriot "national" elections." The US Department of State also recorded that "Greek Cypriots and Maronite residents were prohibited from participating in Turkish Cypriot "national" elections; they were eligible to vote in Greek Cypriot elections but had to travel to the government-controlled area to exercise that right." It also reported that the elections in Northern Cyprus in 2009 and 2010 were free and fair and that "authorities did not restrict the political opposition, and membership or non-membership in the dominant party did not confer formal advantages or disadvantages".

=== Freedom from torture ===
In January 2009, the Turkish Cypriot Human Rights Foundation (TCHRF), acknowledged that: "Torture and inhuman treatment cases by the police are frequently reported and lawyers and the TCHRF are pressing authorities to truly investigate them."

=== Freedom of religion ===
The constitution of Northern Cyprus protects the freedom of religion, and it states that Northern Cyprus is a secular state. The US Department of State report in 2002 stated that religious freedom was protected by law in Northern Cyprus and the government generally respected the freedom of religion. The freedom of religion report in 2007 by US Department of State also stated that "Turkish Cypriot authorities generally respected this right in practice" and the practice of religion was generally free. In 2009, Minority Rights Group International also reported that "Turkish Cypriot authorities respected religious freedom in general."

On 27 January 2011, 68 representatives in the Parliamentary Assembly of the Council of Europe, in written declaration no. 467, condemned the: "Interruption of the Christmas mass in the northern occupied part of Cyprus by Turkish troops and restrictions to the right to freedom of religion and worship." Where it was noted that Turkish troops forced the priest conducting the service at Agios Synesios, in Rizokarpaso, to remove his vestments and ordered everybody to leave the church thus violating the European Convention on Human Rights.

=== Freedom of speech and of the press ===
On 6 July 1996, the Committee to Protect Journalists reported that, Kutlu Adali, a journalist of the newspaper Yeni Duzen, was fatally shot outside his home. He had criticised the government's immigration policies. Adali's wife went to court at the European Court of Human Rights as a result of the failure of the Northern Cyprus authorities to investigate her husband's murder adequately.

The US Department of State report in 2002 stated that freedom of speech and press was generally respected in Northern Cyprus and there were opposition newspapers which often criticized the government.

World Press Freedom Index 2010 ranked Cyprus and Northern Cyprus 45 and 61 respectively. Also, in 2010, the US Department of State reported that the freedom of press was again generally respected, there were no restrictions on the internet, and the independent media were active and expressed a wide variety of views without restriction.

In April 2011, the International News Safety Institute reported that, Mutlu Esendemir, the news editor for the Turkish-Cypriot television channel Kanal T, and a reporter for the Turkish-language newspaper Kıbrıs, were both injured in a car bomb. Esendemir was convinced that the attack was related to articles concerning town planning issues in Kyrenia. Kemal Darbaz, the president of Basin Sen, the journalist association, noted that attacks against journalists had become more common.

== Rights ==
=== Right to education ===
During the 2004/5 school year, a gymnasium, adding to the only Greek Cypriot primary school in Northern Cyprus, was opened for the Greek Cypriot community in Rizokarpaso, this was the first Greek Cypriot community secondary school available to the community since the Turkish invasion of Cyprus in 1974.

In 2008, the Cypriot Financial Mirror newspaper has recorded that, the government of Northern Cyprus had prevented schoolteachers from returning to the primary school in Rizokarpaso.

In 2010, US Department of State reported that "there were no recorded cases of official or societal discrimination based on [...] access to education".

=== Rights of LGBT ===
Sexual intercourse between consenting adult females is legal in Northern Cyprus. Male homosexuality was still criminalised in Northern Cyprus until January 2014, while anti-homosexuality legislation formerly in effect in the Republic of Cyprus was repealed following a 1993 ruling by the European Court of Human Rights (Modinos v. Cyprus).

On 27 January 2014 Turkish Cypriot deputies passed an amendment repealing a colonial-era law that punished homosexual acts with up to five years in prison by a new Criminal Code. It was the last territory in Europe to decriminalise sexual relations between consenting, adult men. In response to the vote, Paulo Corte-Real from the International Lesbian, Gay, Bisexual, Trans and Intersex Association, a rights advocacy group said that "We welcome today's vote and can finally call Europe a continent completely free from laws criminalising homosexuality".

=== Rights of minorities ===
In 2008, a synagogue was opened in Kyrenia for the small Jewish community in Northern Cyprus which mostly comprises non-resident businesspersons. There have been no reported Anti-Semitic attacks.

The tiny Greek and Maronite minority communities live in enclaves and suffer from social and economic disadvantages. The small Kurdish population is reportedly subject to discrimination in employment. Both groups have complained of surveillance by Northern Cyprus authorities.

=== Rights of women ===
The law of Northern Cyprus prohibits domestic violence under a general assault/violence/battery clause in the criminal code, although a separate domestic violence legislation has not yet been passed in Northern Cyprus. In January 2009, the Turkish Cypriot Human Rights Foundation, noted that women do not have equal rights as men, nor do they live in similar conditions as men, especially when married. Women are prevented from enjoying their rights by the patriarchal society. A US Department of State report in 2010 indicated that although authorities handled and prosecuted rape cases effectively, violence against women was an issue and there were no NGOs to support victims of rape.

== History ==
=== Issues pertaining to the Cyprus problem ===
In 2001, the US Department of State said that Greek Cypriot and Maronite minorities are not treated as well as they should be. However, another US Department of State report in 2002 reported that the government of Northern Cyprus was easing restrictions on minorities and it respected the rights of travelling abroad and emigrating. In April 1998, the United Kingdom-based National Coalition of Anti-Deportation Campaigns asserted that the Turkish army had carried out a forced migration policy where Kurds were forced to colonise Northern Cyprus from the Republic of Turkey, and The Immigration and Nationality Directorate of the United Kingdom in 1999 said that Kurds were not being discriminated against and enjoyed equal political and religious rights to others.

The Class Action lawsuit, Greek Cypriots, et al. v. TRNC and HSBC Bank USA, initiated by Greek Cypriot refugees from the Turkish invasion of Cyprus in 1974, has been joined by Sandra Kocinski, Pat Clarke and Suz Latchford who paid for but have never been given legal title to the villas that they purchased in the northern part of the island.

The Immoveable Property Commission of Northern Cyprus offers to buy outright the properties of displaced persons in case of an application to the commission but does not allow the return of displaced persons to their properties or land.

Unjustified killings:

On 14 August 1996, during a protest at the United Nations Buffer Zone, Solomos Solomou, a Greek Cypriot refugee, was shot and killed while climbing a flagpole in order to remove a Turkish flag. The incident occurred only a few days after the funeral of his cousin Tassos Isaac, who was murdered a few days earlier, by Turkish nationalists belonging to the militant Grey Wolves organization, during an earlier protest.

On 22 November 2005, concerning the chamber judgment of Kakoulli v. Turkey at the European Court of Human Rights:

"The Court held, unanimously, that there had been:

· a violation of Article 2 (right to life) of the European Convention on Human Rights concerning the killing of the applicants’ relative by a Turkish soldier in the buffer zone between northern and southern Cyprus;

· a violation of Article 2 concerning the inadequate investigation into his death ..."

Furthermore, in January 2011, The Report of the Office of the United Nations High Commissioner for Human Rights on the question of Human Rights in Cyprus noted that:

"The case of Andreou v. Turkey (45653/99) concerns an unjustified killing in the area of the UN buffer zone and Panayi v. Turkey (45388/99) in the area of entry in the UN buffer zone."

Displaced Greek Cypriots:

The European Court of Human Rights ruled in the case of Loizidou v. Turkey concerning the right of Greek Cypriot Titina Loizidou to return to her home, since the Turkish invasion of Cyprus, and also highlighted the failure of the Republic of Turkey to compensate Loizidou after the ruling at a later Human Rights meeting of the Council of Europe: "... that the Turkish authorities had continuously prevented her from having access to and enjoying certain property she owned in northern Cyprus."

In May 2001, the European Court of Human Rights (ECHR) ruled:

"... that Turkey was responsible for violations of human rights in Cyprus stemming from the 1974 Turkish military intervention. The result of a complaint by the Government of Cyprus, the decision rejected the Turkish argument that the "TRNC" is an independent state and instead ruled that it is "a subordinate local administration of Turkey operating in northern Cyprus"."

The Enclaved:

In May 2001, the European Court of Human Rights (ECHR) pointed out that Turkey had ignored its earlier rulings concerning the right to education. The ECHR also highlighted, amongst other violations, the following two that were directly relevant to the right to education, where the second summarily describes what Rizokarpaso primary school teachers (and their families) were subjected to:

"... violation of Article 2 of Protocol No. 1 (right to education) in respect of Greek Cypriots living in northern Cyprus in so far as no appropriate secondary-school facilities were available to them; ... violation of Article 3 in that the Greek Cypriots living in the Karpas area of northern Cyprus had been subjected to discrimination amounting to degrading treatment;"

Moreover, the ECHR noted the censorship of school books and the denial of secondary school education to the enclaved. The ECHR called on the Turkish authorities to stop censoring Greek language textbooks and informed them that the closure of Greek-language schools was a denial of the right to education.

In 2003, the Ministry of Education and Culture of the Republic of Cyprus noted in its report that the primary school at Rizokarpasso was the only Greek Cypriot primary school in Northern Cyprus and that it had three teachers and twenty-five students. On 1 September 2003, at the European Parliament, in Strasbourg, during "One minute speeches on matters of political importance", two European MEPs raised their concern about the expulsion, by local authorities, of two Rizokarpaso Primary School teachers (Alexia and Grigoris Koukotsikas) together with their children.

The restrictions of the enclaved were highlighted in an earlier report, by the United Nations:

"... the U.N. Secretary-General in his report on December 1995 stated that Greek Cypriots and Maronites in the occupied area were "the object of very severe restrictions which curtailed the exercise of many basic freedoms and had the effect of ensuring that, inexorably with the passage of time these communities would cease to exist in the northern part of the island."

"The Secretary-General, in his report to the Security Council dated 30 November 1991 (S/24050), stated: "... on a number of occasions UNFICYP was impeded ... while conducting humanitarian tasks in support of Greek Cypriots in the north. Access to the Greek Cypriots living in the Karpas peninsula by UNFICYP humanitarian staff and civilian police was on several occasions denied ... uninterrupted freedom of movement in carrying out its established and important humanitarian duties and responsibilities" ..."

=== Views of the Republic of Cyprus ===
The Republic of Cyprus claimed in a 1994 report that the rights of enclaved Greek Cypriots were being violated. The report featured claims of denial of Greek Cypriot doctors' rights to settle in the area or regularly visit it, restrictions on the movement of the UN peacekeeping forces, alleged requirements of an application of the enclaved to move outside their villages and to report to a police station weekly, being made to clean the station and the adjacent areas. It claimed that these were part of "a persistent policy of harassment, racial discrimination, intimidation and coercion". The report also drew attention to the distribution of Greek Cypriot property by the Turkish Cypriot authorities as a violation of the right to property, and the continued prevention of 200,000 displaced Greek Cypriots to return to their property.

== Other issues ==
The constant focus on the division of the island sometimes masks other human rights issues. Prostitution is rife, and the island has been criticized for its role in the sex trade as one of the main routes of human trafficking from Eastern Europe.

In January 2009, the Turkish Cypriot Human Rights Foundation noted concerns about human trafficking:

"Trafficking in persons is a major visible area of human rights violations in North Cyprus which is a destination country for trafficked women from countries such as Ukraine, Moldova and Russia. Human trafficking appears to be on the rise in North Cyprus as it is worldwide."

== See also ==
- Human rights in Cyprus
- Internet censorship and surveillance in Cyprus
- Loizidou v. Turkey, a 1989 legal case regarding the rights of refugees wishing to return to their former homes and properties.
- Greek Cypriots, et al. v. TRNC and HSBC Bank USA, a class action suit by Greek Cypriots and others suing for "the denial of access to and enjoyment of land and property held in the north".
- Kormakitis, a small village on the northern coast of Cyprus.
- Rizokarpaso, a town on the Karpass Peninsula in the northeastern part of Cyprus.
