= Cyprus v Turkey =

Concerning Turkish Invasion of Cyprus

Cyprus v. Turkey (IV) (2001) (No. 25781/94) is a case raised by Cyprus against Turkey in 1994 and decided on merits by the Grand Chamber of the European Court of Human Rights in 2001. It concerns the situation existing in Northern Cyprus after 1974 Turkish invasion of Cyprus and the de facto separation of the Mediterranean island.

== Judgment ==
On the accountability, the Court held, by sixteen votes to one, referring to its Loizidou v. Turkey judgment, that the facts, which were complained of, fell within the jurisdiction of Turkey and therefore entailed Turkey's responsibility.

On the merits, the Court held with differing divisions of votes (in most cases either unanimously or by 16 votes to 1):

- that there had been 14 violations of the European Convention on Human Rights by Turkey:
  - Violations of Articles 3 and 5 concerning Greek-Cypriot missing persons and their relatives;
  - Violations of Articles 8, 13 and P1-1 concerning home and property of displaced Greek-Cypriots;
  - Violations of Articles 3, 8, 9, 10, 13, P1-1 and P1-2 concerning living conditions of Greek-Cypriots in Karpas region of northern Cyprus;
  - Violation of Article 6, concerning rights of Turkish Cypriots living in northern Cyprus;
- that there had been no violation concerning part of complaints, including all those raised under Articles 4, 11 and 14, and
- that it was not necessary to consider some complaints, including those under Article P1-3.

Deciding on possible awarding compensation was postponed and the judgment on this issue was adopted on 12 May 2014, ordering Turkey to pay €90,000,000 to Cyprus.

== Separate opinions ==
Judges Palm (Sweden), Costa (France), Jungwiert (Czech Republic), Pantiru (Moldova), Levits (Latvia), Kovler (Russia), Fuad (Turkey) and Marcus-Helmons (Cyprus) expressed partly dissenting opinions to the judgment on the merits.

15 judges have expressed five concurring or dissenting opinions on the judgment on just satisfaction.
