= United Nations General Assembly Resolution 3212 (XXIX) =

UN General Assembly 3212
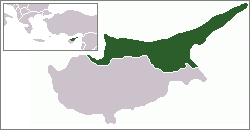
- Occupied Cyprus
- Date: 1 November 1974
- Code: S/11557
- Subject: Cyprus
- Voting summary: 117 voted for; None voted against; None abstained
- Result: Adopted

United Nations General Assembly Resolution 3212 was adopted on 1 November 1974, after statements in debate and the Report of the Special Political Committee on the Question of Cyprus regarding the Turkish invasion of Cyprus.

== Resolution ==
The United Nations General Assembly:

"1. Calls upon all states to respect the sovereignty, independence, territorial integrity and non-alignment of the Republic of Cyprus and to refrain from all acts and interventions directed against it;

"2. Urges the speedy withdrawal of all foreign armed forces and foreign military presence and personnel from the Republic of Cyprus and the cessation of all foreign interference in its affairs;

"3. Considers that the constitutional system of the Republic of Cyprus concerns the Greek-Cypriot and Turkish-Cypriot communities;

"4. Commends the contacts and negotiations taking place on an equal footing, with the good offices of the Secretary-General between the representatives of the two communities, and calls for their continuation with a view to reaching freely a mutually acceptable political settlement, based on their fundamental and legitimate rights;

"5. Considers that all the refugees should return to their homes in safety and calls upon the parties concerned to undertake urgent measures to that end;

"6. Expresses the hope that, if necessary, further efforts including negotiations can take place, within the framework of the United Nations, for the purpose of implementing the provisions of the present resolution, thus ensuring to the Republic of Cyprus its fundamental right to independence, sovereignty and territorial integrity"

The resolution was adopted by 117 votes in favour, none against and no abstentions.

== See also ==
- Cyprus dispute
- List of United Nations Security Council Resolutions 501 to 600 (1982–1987)
- United Nations Buffer Zone in Cyprus
- Turkish Invasion of Cyprus
