= Representative Office of Northern Cyprus to the United States =

Unofficial mission to the United Nations

Coordinates: 38°54′10.8″N 77°2′17.2″W

TRNC Coat of Arms

The Representative Office of Northern Cyprus is a representative office of the Turkish Republic of Northern Cyprus to the United States. The United States does not formally recognize the Turkish Republic of Northern Cyprus, and therefore the office is legally a commercial enterprise. The staff of the Representative Offices do not have diplomatic visas and only operate within the United States using business visas. It is located at 1667 K Street, Northwest in Washington, D.C. The Representative Office in New York City is the de facto mission of the TRNC to the United Nations Organization (as well as a de facto Consulate-General).

== Status ==
As the United States does not recognize the TRNC as an independent country, the mission does not have formal diplomatic status under the provisions of the Vienna Convention on Diplomatic Relations. As such, the United States Department of State does not have the TRNC flag as part of its collection of national flags (denoting nations with which the United States has diplomatic relations) at its headquarters in Foggy Bottom, nor does the President of the United States accept credentials from the head of mission.

== Ranking diplomats ==
Hilmi Akil serves as the current de facto TRNC Ambassador (officially regarded as the Washington D.C. Representative of the Turkish Cypriot Community). He succeeded Osman Ertuğ, who served as the TRNC representative from 2002 to 2007. Kemal Gökeri serves as the current de facto TRNC Chief of Mission (officially regarded as the Representative of the Turkish Cypriot Community in New York City), succeeding Reşat Çağlar in January 2007. Although, TRNC Ambassadors to the USA have no recognition of their TRNC diplomatic passports, TRNC Diplomats also hold Republic of Turkey diplomatic passports and have the status of Ambassador Extraordinary and Plenipotentiary of the Republic of Turkey due to bilateral arrangements between the TRNC and Turkey.

== Legal action ==
An American attorney, Athan Tsimpedes, filed a lawsuit against the representative office in 2010, claiming that it operated as a commercial enterprise and sold stolen properties owned by British citizens. The lawsuit, Toumazou v. Republic of Turkey, was dismissed in 2014 for lack of jurisdiction.

== Further information ==
As well as representing the TRNC, this office supervises the other TRNC Representatives and Honorary Representative offices in the United States. These serve as de facto consulates and Honorary Consulates, with the exception of the TRNC Representative Office in New York, which is the TRNC's unofficial mission to the United Nations. Objections to the presence of this office by the internationally recognized government of the Republic of Cyprus are countered by the status of this mission—and its staff—as a commercial, non-diplomatic entity. Under United States law, the mission is regarded simply as an information center operated by staff with non-diplomatic visas; its existence does not imply formal recognition of the TRNC by the United States.

== See also ==
- Foreign relations of Northern Cyprus
- Diplomatic missions of the Turkish Republic of Northern Cyprus
- Toumazou v. Republic of Turkey
