= Polyxeni Loizias =

Cypriotic feminist

Polyxeni Loizias (Greek: Πολυξένη Λοϊζιάς) (Limassol, 1855—1942), was a Cypriot educator, writer and feminist. She was a pioneering figure in the feminist and women's movement in Cyprus.

== Early life and education ==
She was born in Limassol in 1855. She was educated first in the Limassol School for Girls, then in Smyrna in the school Agia Fotini under another Cypriot educator, Sappho Leontias and she finished her studies in 1878 in Constantinople at Palladion again under Sappho Leontias.

== Career ==
In 1878 after the transfer of Cyprus from the Ottoman to the British Empire, Loizias returned to Limassol and was employed as the principal of the Limassol School for Girls (Παρθεναγωγείο), which was founded in 1859 as the first school for higher education for women in Cyprus. At that point, most women were illiterate and it was not until 1895 that the British introduced a public school system, and most Cypriot families outside of the elite upper class long opposed education for girls. She taught at the school for 35 years, until 1913. She was the first educator in Cyprus to introduce physical education in the cariculum.

She expanded the educational opportunities for women on Cyprus: as an author, she participated in the public debate in favour of education and a professional life for women; and as a principal, she fulfilled these reforms by sending students to study in universities in Greece when women were allowed to study in university level, no universities existed in Cyprus at the time, and by starting educational courses for adult women teachers in her school. She participated in several women’s associations and charity groups and was a prolific writer.

She is the first woman author who lived and wrote in Cyprus, the first Cypriot woman author was her teacher Sappho Leontias who lived outside of Cyprus.

== Legacy ==
The Cyprus University of Technology named one of its buildings after her and Eleni Autonomou, another pioneering schoolteacher. In 2015 she was commemorated by a stamp from the Cyprus post.

== Publications ==
- Πατριδογραφία Κύπρου, Λεμεσός, 1890.
- Ἡ Δούλη Κύπρος, Λεμεσός, 1890.
- Ἴριδες, Αθήνα, 1901.
- Ἡ ψυχή τῆς Κύπρου (ἔπος ἤ ἐγκόλπιον τῶν Ἑλληνίδων), Λεμεσός, 1908.
- Κυπριακή Κυψέλη, περιοδική έκδοση 1912-1920, Λεμεσός, 1921.
- Κυπριακόν Λεύκωμα, Λεμεσός, 1924.
- Μαθητικός Κόσμος, Λεμεσός, 1925.

== See also ==
- Persophone Papadopulou
