= Persephone Papadopoulou =

Cypriot feminist and educator

Persephone Papadopoulou (Greek: Περσεφόνη Παπαδοπούλου) (Paphos, 1888— Patras, 1948), was a Cypriot feminist, educator and scholar. She was a pioneering figure in the feminist and women's movement in Cyprus.

== Early life, education and career ==
Persephone was born in 1888 in Paphos, she graduated from the Arsakeio high school in Athens.

With her return to Cyprus she worked as an educator in Famagusta, she was vice-principal of the Senior Girls' School Between 1905-1919 and later as the principal of the Scholarcheio (Σχολαρχείο) in Larnaca. Later she studied philosophy, sociology, psychology and pedagogy at the University of Sorbonne. Upon her return in 1924 she worked at the Didaskaleio Thileon (Διδασκαλείο Θηλέων) in Nicosia. In 1937 she was invited by the Greek government to be the principal of the Arsakeio Lyceum of Patras, a position she held for 12 years, until her death.

She belonged to the minority of Cypriot elite women who were educated abroad in a time period when there was not yet a university in Cyprus. She founded and managed the feminist periodical Εστιάδες (Estiades) (1913-1915). It was the first feminist newspaper in Cyprus, and held an international standard, informing women of the international women's movement at the time. It was a pioneering publication in a time period when Cyprus did not yet have any organized women's movement. However, the short period of feminist debate did not result in any organised women's movement in Cyprus, since the level of education was so low in Cyprus - many women still being illiterate - that the periodical was not able to reach more than a small circle of educated elite women (no women's movement was to organize in Cyprus until the mid 20th-century).

== Legacy ==
In 2015 she was commemorated by a stamp from the Cyprus post.

== Publications ==
- Ἐκπαιδευτικόν ὑπόμνημα. Ἡ ἐν Ἑλλάδι μεταρρυθμιστική κίνησις καί τά κυριώτερα προβλήματα τοῦ Κυπριακοῦ σχολείου (1930).
- Πίνακες μαθητικῆς ὠχρότητος καί καχεξίας (1931).
- Ἡ φιλοσοφία τοῦ Μπερξόν (1939).

== Publications about Persephone ==
- Φιλεκπαιδευτική Εταιρεία Αρσάκειον Πατρών (1950). Περσεφόνη Παπαδοπούλου. Γενική Διευθύντρια των σχολείων 1935-1948. Πάτραι: Εκδοτικός οίκος Χαρ. Καγιάφα.

== See also ==
- Polyxeni Loizias
- Sappho Leontias
