= Alexandra Papadopoulou (author) =

Greek writer (1867–1906)

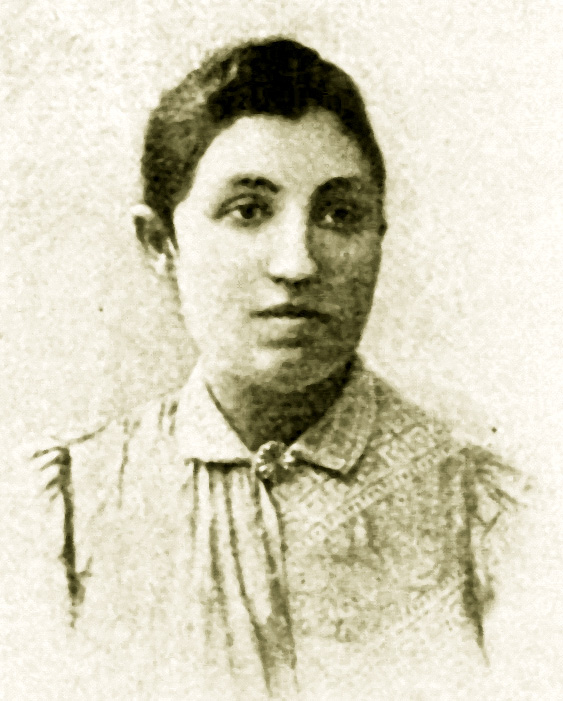
Alexandra Papadopoulou

Alexandra Papadopoulou (January 1867 Constantinople – 8 March 1906) was a Greek short story writer, columnist, teacher and publicist. She is recognized as the first Greek prose writer, with some feminist ideas. She was also a pioneer Greek publisher of literary publications, as a woman in a profession dominated by men.

== Life ==
Alexandra Papadopoulou was born in Istanbul in January 1876. She was the daughter of Vasilios Papadopoulos, a military doctor, and Eleni Falieri. She studied at "Pallas" Girls' School, where her teacher was the important feminist and educator Sappho Leontias. In 1886 she received a teacher's degree, but was unable to continue her studies with a scholarship because of her innovative views on pedagogical issues. She worked in schools near Constantinople and in Silivri. She taught in Bucharest, at the Greek Girls' School "Evangelismos", until 1902, while supplementing her income as a home teacher.

In Constantinople, she was the home teacher of the children of Fotis Fotiadis, the doctor and scholar who was a pioneer form of educational municipalism in the Ottoman capital through the "Brotherhood of the National Language" association. In 1887, Papadopoulou and Charikleia Korakidou published Imerologion ton Kyrion [Ladies' Calendar], a publication with women's themes, in Constantinople. Later that year Kallirroi Parren published a corresponding edition in Athens. In 1896, in collaboration with Ioannis Gryparis, she published Philological Echo.

In 1893, she founded the Ladies' Progressive Association. The founding of this association by Papadopoulou, a young unmarried woman, was considered scandalous by many of her fellow citizens, who attacked her violently (for this reason she often signed her texts with various pseudonyms), calling her, indicatively: "Leave aside Progressive Associations and protest and paradoxical beginnings and the idea of women's emancipation. Go down to the domestic economy and focus your attention there, because the woman was born for the home, while the man for science and society". These attacks had a significant effect on her exclusion as a teacher from the Greek schools of Constantinople (1899).

In 1905 she was assigned the management of the girls' school in Thessaloniki, a position she was soon forced to leave for health reasons and move back to Constantinople, Her presence in Thessaloniki was also related to the outbreak of the Macedonian Struggle, since Papadopoulou believed in taking action to resolve the national issues of Greece. For this reason she had contacts with both Pavlos Melas and Germanos Karavangelis.

Alexandra Papadopoulou died on 8 March 1906, from stomach cancer, in the Balıklı Greek Hospital in the Yedikule quarter, "coincidentally on the day dedicated to women's rights" as the literary critic Mari Theodosopoulou has observed.

== Works ==
- Δεσμίς διηγημάτων. Μέρος Α΄ [Bundle of short stories. Part A]. With a foreword by Gr. Xenopoulos. Constantinople, 1889.
- Διηγήματα Β΄ [Short stories B]. Constantinople, 1891.
- Ημερολόγιον της δεσποινίδος Λεσβίου [Diary of Miss Lesbian]. Constantinople, 1894.
