= Greek Cypriots in Northern Cyprus =

Minority group in Northern Cyprus

Enclaved Greek Cypriots (Greek: Εγκλωβισμένοι) are the Greek Cypriots who have remained in enclaved villages in Northern Cyprus after the Turkish invasion of Cyprus in 1974.

In 2014, the population of Greek Cypriots was 343. The Greek Cypriots in Rizokarpaso elects their muhtar in the elections organised in the south by Republic of Cyprus (that has no legal personality in the laws of Northern Cyprus).

== Notable cases of discrimination ==
Eleni Foka was one of three Greek Cypriot primary school teachers in Karpasia, whose safety was called into question. She was a teacher at the Greek-Cypriot elementary school in Ayia Triada, Yialousa, in the Northern Cyprus' Karpas region. She took her issue to the European Court of Human Rights. On 5 May 1994, her case was mentioned in a report submitted by the Republic of Cyprus to the United Nations International Convention on the Elimination of all Forms of Racial Discrimination. It stated that:

At the beginning of March 1994, the Greek Cypriot teacher of the enclaved school in Ayia Triada, Ms. Eleni Foka, was very nearly expelled [from Northern Cyprus] after making a public statement to the effect that she felt threatened. It was only after repeated protests that her expulsion was prevented.

In February 2011, it was announced that Eleni Foka has joined the participants of the Greek Cypriots, et al. v. TRNC and HSBC Bank USA class action. In September 2014, United States Federal Court rejected the case of Greek Cypriots.

In the 1996/97 school year the primary school in Ayia Triada had to close down "due to the denial of the Turkish occupational forces to allow the school teacher Mrs Eleni Foka to return to her village, regardless of the intense efforts of the [Republic of] Cyprus government for her return." The Cypriot Financial Mirror newspaper has recorded that as recently as September 2008, the government of Northern Cyprus has prevented schoolteachers from returning to the primary school in Rizokarpaso.

== See also ==
- Turkish Cypriot enclaves, between 1963 and 1974
- Rizokarpaso
- Rizokarpaso Primary School
- Kormakitis
