= Travaux préparatoires =

Source of interpretation of treaties under international law

The travaux préparatoires (French pronunciation: [tʁa.vo pʁe.pa.ʁa.twaʁ], lit. 'preparatory works', in the plural) are the official record of a negotiation. Sometimes published, the "travaux" are often useful in clarifying the intentions of a treaty or other instrument, as is reflected in Article 32 of the Vienna Convention on the Law of Treaties (VCLT).

To interpret treaties, the VCLT places this form of interpretation as secondary to the ordinary meaning (see Articles 31 and 32).

In the Sigurjónsson v Iceland case, the European Court of Human Rights noted that the use of the travaux préparatoires in the earlier Young, James and Webster case was not decisive but merely provided a working hypothesis. The preparatory work was legitimately invoked by the European Commission to show that section 2 of Article 2 of Protocol 4 to the European Convention on Human Rights, which reads "Everyone shall be free to leave any country, including his own", does not entitle a convicted prisoner to leave the country in which he is lawfully detained.

An example of such interpretation was provided by Lord Diplock in the case Fothergill v Monarch Airlines Ltd [1980].

The travaux préparatoires are often available to the public on websites created for a specific treaty (such as the Rome Statute) or on the United Nations website.

The most well-known travaux are associated with the drafting of the Genocide Convention.

== Bibliography ==
- Jonathon Green, Dictionary of Jargon, Routledge, 1987, ISBN 0-7100-9919-3, p. 567.
