= Toumazou v. Republic of Turkey =

2010 class action lawsuit in the US

Toumazou et al v. Republic of Turkey et al Toumazou et al v. Turkish Republic of Northern Cyprus
- Court: United States District Court for the District of Columbia
- Full case name: Toumazou et al v. Republic of Turkey et al Toumazou et al v. Turkish Republic of Northern Cyprus

Court membership
- Judge sitting: Paul L. Friedman

Keywords
- Greek Cypriot diaspora, TRNC Representative Offices in the United States, HSBC Bank USA, Eleni Foka.

Toumazou et al. v. Republic of Turkey et al., was a class action suit by Greek Cypriots and others against the TRNC Representative Offices in the United States and HSBC Bank USA. Turkey was dropped as defendant on 16 February 2010 and the lawsuit name was subsequently revised to Toumazou et al. v. Turkish Republic of Northern Cyprus. The TRNC Representative Offices are a commercial entity because the United States does not formally recognise the Turkish Republic of Northern Cyprus. The staff of the Representative Offices do not have diplomatic visas and only operate within the United States using business visas. Tsimpedes Law in Washington DC sued for "the denial of access to and enjoyment of land and property held in the north". The lawsuit, originally initiated by Cypriots displaced during the Turkish invasion of Cyprus in 1974, was joined by non-Cypriots who paid for but have never been given legal title to properties that they have purchased.

== Participation ==
More than 100 people living in the United States, the United Kingdom, Cyprus and Greece filed to participate in this class action. Foreign nationals and foreign organizations are legally allowed to sue in American courts. The municipality of Karavas, as well as Eleni Foka, the primary school teacher who had sued Turkey at the European Court of Human Rights for violating her human rights, also joined the suit.

== Historical context ==
When the Republic of Turkey invaded the Republic of Cyprus in 1974 many thousands of Cypriots were displaced from their homes and their land and have since been prevented from enjoying their use.

Since 1974, homes have been built on land that is still owned by displaced Cypriots and those new homes have been sold to buyers, who may not have known that the land that the homes were built on was still owned by displaced Cypriots.

== Parties ==
=== Plaintiffs ===
The plaintiffs were Michalis Toumazou, Nicolas Kantzilaris, and Maroulla Tompazou. The class action was to be brought on behalf of all displaced Cypriots, and others, who are victims of alleged property crimes committed by the commercial entity called the TRNC (representing the Turkish Republic of Northern Cyprus, a country which is not recognized by the United States) and HSBC Bank USA's participation in the alleged laundering of funds for that commercial entity. Originally initiated by displaced Cypriots from the Turkish invasion of Cyprus in 1974, the class action was joined by Sandra Kocinski, Pat Clarke, and Suz Latchford who paid for but have never been given legal title to the villas that they purchased.

=== Defendants ===
The named defendants were HSBC Bank USA, N.A., HSBC Group, HSBC Holdings PLC, Mehmet Ali Talat, and TRNC. Turkey was dropped as defendant on 16 February 2010 and the lawsuit name was subsequently revised to Toumazou et al v. Turkish Republic of Northern Cyprus.

== Decision ==
On 30 September 2014, the court dismissed the case with prejudice for lack of jurisdiction.

== See also ==
- List of class-action lawsuits
